= List of birds of Thailand =

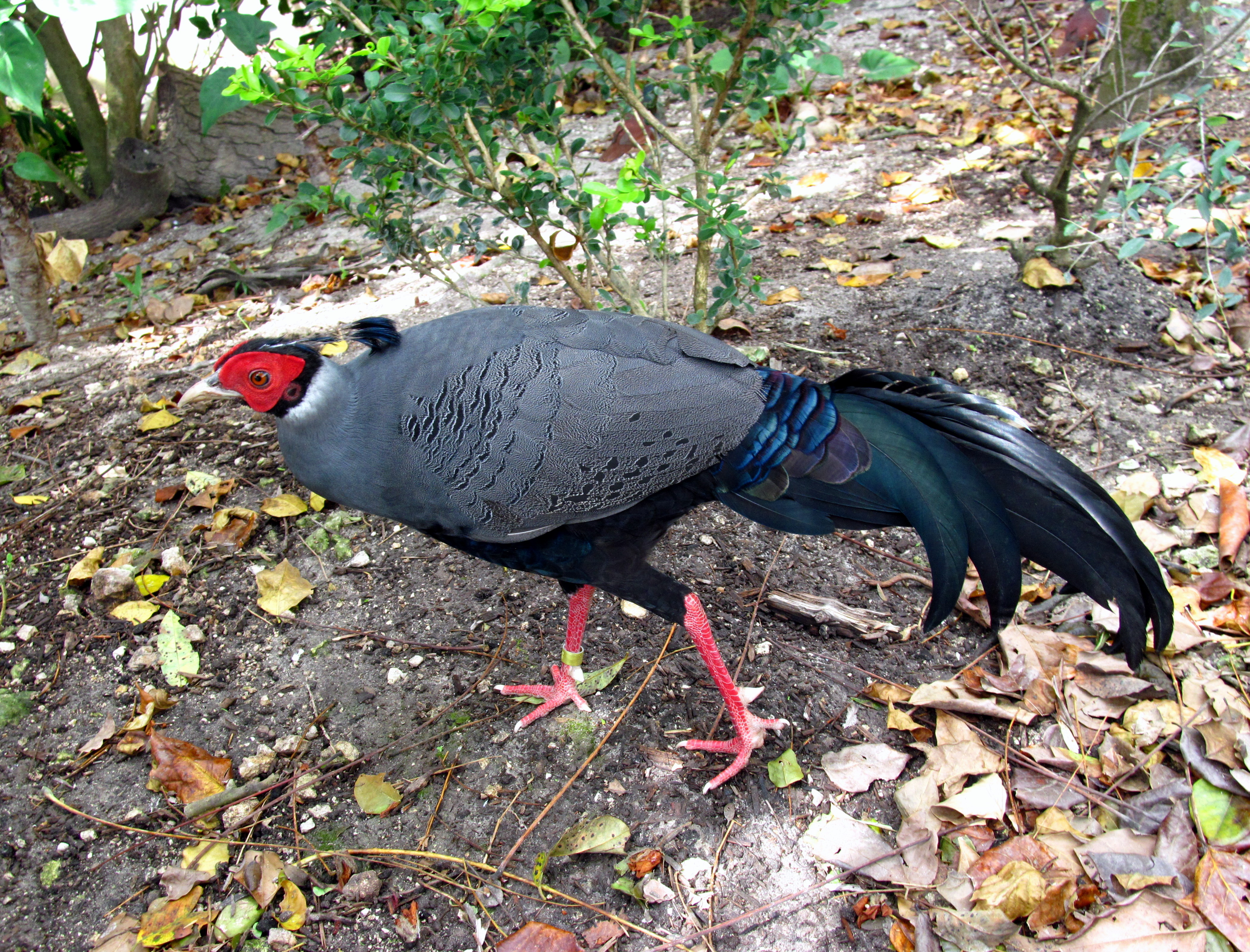
The Siamese fireback is the national bird of Thailand.

The birds of Thailand included 1106 species as of 2024. Of them, 7 have been introduced by humans, and eight have been extirpated.

The birds of Thailand are mainly typical of the Indomalayan realm, with affinities to the Indian subcontinent to the west, and, particularly in Southern Thailand, with the Sundaic fauna to the southeast. The northern mountains are outliers of the Tibetan Plateau, with many species of montane birds, and in winter the avifauna is augmented by migrants from the eastern Palearctic and Himalayas. That Thailand's habitats are contiguous with those of neighbouring countries explains the low number of endemic species.

In 1991, it was estimated that 159 resident and 23 migratory species were endangered or vulnerable due to forest clearance, illegal logging, hunting and habitat degradation, especially in the lowlands. The species most affected are large water birds whose wetland habitat has been largely lost to agriculture, and forest species, as deforestation for agriculture and logging have removed and degraded portions of the woodlands.

This list's taxonomic treatment (designation and sequence of orders, families and species) and nomenclature (English and scientific names) are those of The Clements Checklist of Birds of the World, 2022 edition. The designations as accidental, introduced, and extirpated, and the notes of worldwide population status such as "critically endangered", are from Bird Checklists of the World. The notes of status in Thailand, such as "winter visitor", are from Lekagul and Round (1991). Species with no indicated status are resident or partially resident non-rarities.

== Ducks, geese, and waterfowl ==
Order: Anseriformes Family: Anatidae

Anatidae includes the ducks and most duck-like waterfowl, such as geese and swans. These birds are adapted to an aquatic existence with webbed feet, flattened bills, and feathers that are excellent at shedding water due to an oily coating.

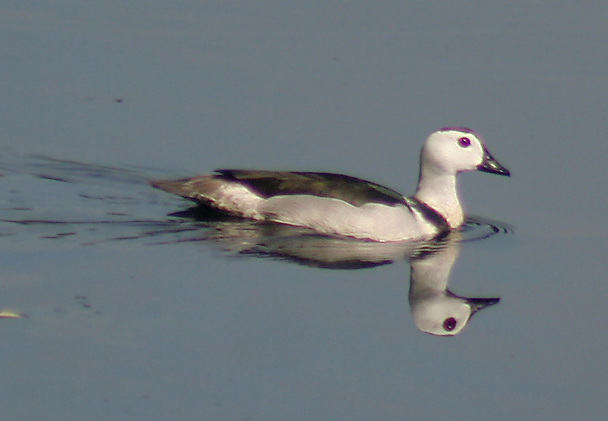
A male cotton pygmy-goose

Common name	Binomial	Status
Fulvous whistling-duck	Dendrocygna bicolor	Accidental
Lesser whistling-duck	Dendrocygna javanica	
Bar-headed goose	Anser indicus	Very rare winter visitor
Graylag goose	Anser anser	Accidental
Swan goose	Anser cygnoides	Accidental
Greater white-fronted goose	Anser albifrons	Accidental
Lesser white-fronted goose	Anser erythropus	Accidental
Knob-billed duck	Sarkidiornis melanotos	Rare resident
Ruddy shelduck	Tadorna ferruginea	Rare winter visitor
Common shelduck	Tadorna tadorna	Very rare winter visitor
Cotton pygmy-goose	Nettapus coromandelianus	
Mandarin duck	Aix galericulata	Accidental
Baikal teal	Sibirionetta formosa	Accidental
Garganey	Spatula querquedula	Winter visitor
Northern shoveler	Spatula clypeata	Winter visitor
Gadwall	Mareca strepera	Very rare winter visitor
Falcated duck	Mareca falcata	Accidental
Eurasian wigeon	Mareca penelope	Winter visitor
Indian spot-billed duck	Anas poecilorhyncha	Rare winter visitor
Eastern spot-billed duck	Anas zonorhyncha	Rare winter visitor
Mallard	Anas platyrhynchos	
Northern pintail	Anas acuta	Winter visitor
Green-winged teal	Anas crecca	Winter visitor
White-winged duck	Asarcornis scutulata	Very rare resident, endangered
Red-crested pochard	Netta rufina	Very rare winter visitor
Common pochard	Aythya ferina	Very rare winter visitor
Ferruginous duck	Aythya nyroca	Rare winter visitor
Baer's pochard	Aythya baeri	Rare winter visitor, critically endangered
Tufted duck	Aythya fuligula	Rare winter visitor
Greater scaup	Aythya marila	Accidental
Long-tailed duck	Clangula hyemalis	Accidental
Red-breasted merganser	Mergus serrator	Accidental
Scaly-sided merganser	Mergus squamatus	Accidental, endangered

== Pheasants, grouse, and allies ==
Order: Galliformes Family: Phasianidae

The Phasianidae are a family of terrestrial birds which consists of quails, partridges, snowcocks, francolins, spurfowls, tragopans, monals, pheasants, peafowls, and jungle fowls. In general, they are plump (although they vary in size) and have broad, relatively short wings.

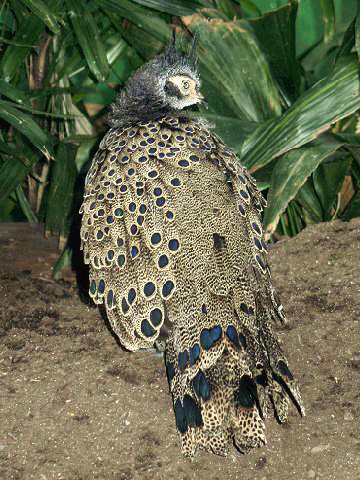
The Malayan peacock-pheasant is vulnerable to extinction due to deforestation.

Common name	Binomial	Status
Ferruginous partridge	Caloperdix oculeus	
Crested partridge	Rollulus rouloul	
Rufous-throated partridge	Arborophila rufogularis	
Chestnut-headed partridge	Arborophila cambodiana	
Bar-backed partridge	Arborophila brunneopectus	
Malayan partridge	Arborophila campbelli	
Long-billed partridge	Rhizothera longirostris	
Hume's pheasant	Syrmaticus humiae	Rare
Kalij pheasant	Lophura leucomelanos	
Silver pheasant	Lophura nycthemera	
Siamese fireback	Lophura diardi	
Malayan crested fireback	Lophura rufa	Rare
Great argus	Argusianus argus	
Green peafowl	Pavo muticus	Endangered
Scaly-breasted partridge	Tropicoperdix chloropus	
Chestnut-necklaced partridge	Tropicoperdix charltonii	
Malayan peacock-pheasant	Polyplectron malacense	
Gray peacock-pheasant	Polyplectron bicalcaratum	
Mountain peacock-pheasant	Polyplectron inopinatum	Accidental
Mountain bamboo-partridge	Bambusicola fytchii	
Red junglefowl	Gallus gallus	
Chinese francolin	Francolinus pintadeanus	
Blue-breasted quail	Synoicus chinesis	
Common quail	Coturnix coturnix	
Japanese quail	Coturnix japonica	Very rare winter visitor
Rain quail	Coturnix coromandelica	

== Flamingos ==
Order: Phoenicopteriformes Family: Phoenicopteridae

Flamingos are gregarious wading birds, usually 3 to 5 feet (0.9 to 1.5 m) tall, found in both the Western and Eastern Hemispheres. Flamingos filter-feed on shellfish and algae. Their oddly shaped beaks are specially adapted to separate mud and silt from the food they consume and, uniquely, are used upside-down.

Common name	Binomial	Status
Greater flamingo	Phoenicopterus roseus	Accidental

== Grebes ==
Order: Podicipediformes Family: Podicipedidae

Grebes are small to medium-large freshwater diving birds. They have lobed toes and are excellent swimmers and divers. Their feet are placed far back on the body, making them quite ungainly on land.

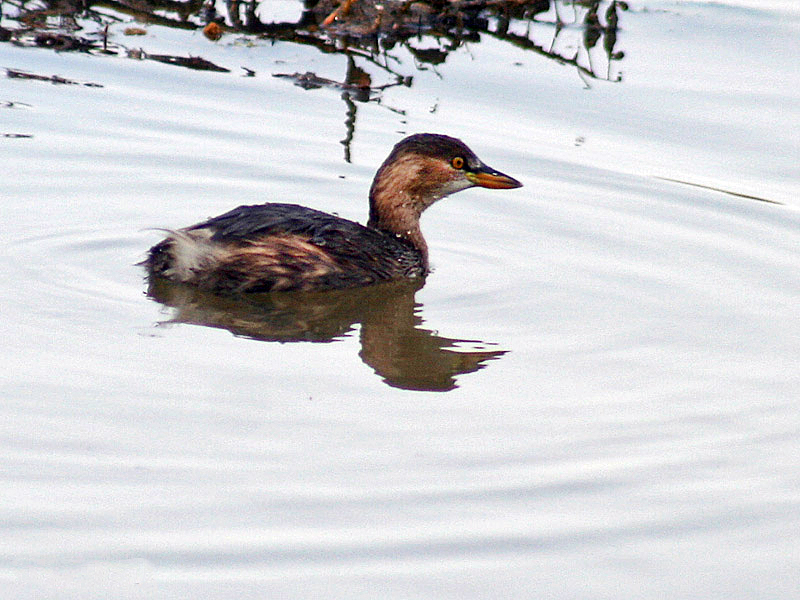
A little grebe in non-breeding plumage

Name	Binomial	Status
Little grebe	Tachybaptus ruficollis	
Horned grebe	Podiceps auritus	Accidental
Great crested grebe	Podiceps cristatus	Very rare winter visitor
Eared grebe	Podiceps nigricollis	Accidental

== Pigeons and doves ==
Order: Columbiformes Family: Columbidae

Pigeons and doves are stout-bodied birds with short necks and short slender bills with a fleshy cere.

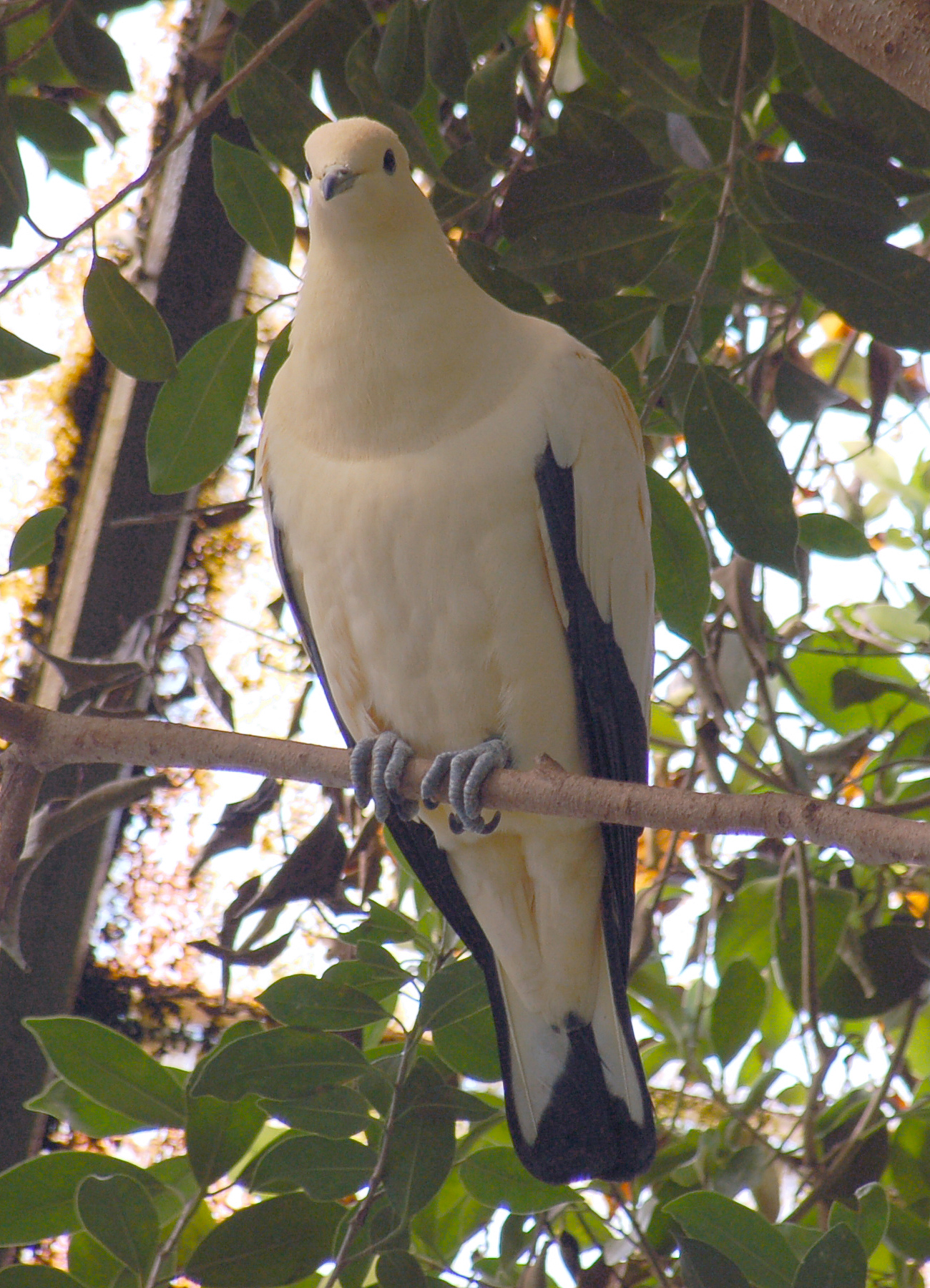
The pied imperial-pigeon is locally common in coastal forests of Thailand.

Common name	Binomial	Status
Rock pigeon	Columba livia	Due to hybridisation with feral pigeons, few if any pure-bred birds remain in Thailand
Speckled wood-pigeon	Columba hodgsonii	
Ashy wood-pigeon	Columba pulchricollis	
Pale-capped pigeon	Columba punicea	Rare, uncertain status
Oriental turtle-dove	Streptopelia orientalis	
Red collared-dove	Streptopelia tranquebarica	
Spotted dove	Streptopelia chinensis	
Barred cuckoo-dove	Macropygia unchall	
Little cuckoo-dove	Macropygia ruficeps	
Asian emerald dove	Chalcophaps indica	
Zebra dove	Geopelia striata	Native in south, introduced to central Thailand
Nicobar pigeon	Caloenas nicobarica	Rare
Little green-pigeon	Treron olax	Rare
Pink-necked green-pigeon	Treron vernans	
Cinnamon-headed green-pigeon	Treron fulvicollis	
Orange-breasted green-pigeon	Treron bicinctus	
Ashy-headed green-pigeon	Treron phayrei	
Thick-billed green-pigeon	Treron curvirostra	
Large green-pigeon	Treron capellei	Rare
Yellow-footed green-pigeon	Treron phoenicopterus	
Yellow-vented green-pigeon	Treron seimundi	Very rare
Pin-tailed green-pigeon	Treron apicauda	
Wedge-tailed green-pigeon	Treron sphenurus	
White-bellied green-pigeon	Treron sieboldii	Very rare
Jambu fruit-dove	Ptilinopus jambu	
Green imperial-pigeon	Ducula aenea	
Mountain imperial-pigeon	Ducula badia	
Pied imperial-pigeon	Ducula bicolor	

== Cuckoos ==
Order: Cuculiformes Family: Cuculidae

The family Cuculidae includes cuckoos, roadrunners, and anis. These birds are of variable size with slender bodies, long tails, and strong legs. Many Old World cuckoo species are brood parasites.

Common name	Binomial	Status
Coral-billed ground-cuckoo	Carpococcyx renauldi	
Short-toed coucal	Centropus rectunguis	Accidental
Greater coucal	Centropus sinensis	
Lesser coucal	Centropus bengalensis	
Raffles's malkoha	Rhinortha chlorophaea	
Red-billed malkoha	Zanclostomus javanicus	
Chestnut-breasted malkoha	Phaenicophaeus curvirostris	
Chestnut-bellied malkoha	Phaenicophaeus sumatranus	
Black-bellied malkoha	Phaenicophaeus diardi	
Green-billed malkoha	Phaenicophaeus tristis	
Chestnut-winged cuckoo	Clamator coromandus	Summer visitor and on passage
Pied cuckoo	Clamator jacobinus	
Asian koel	Eudynamys scolopaceus	
Asian emerald cuckoo	Chrysococcyx maculatus	Resident and winter visitor
Violet cuckoo	Chrysococcyx xanthorhynchus	
Little bronze-cuckoo	Chrysococcyx minutillus	
Banded bay cuckoo	Cacomantis sonneratii	
Plaintive cuckoo	Cacomantis merulinus	
Brush cuckoo	Cacomantis variolosus	
Fork-tailed drongo-cuckoo	Surniculus dicruroides	
Square-tailed drongo-cuckoo	Surniculus lugubris	
Moustached hawk-cuckoo	Hierococcyx vagans	
Large hawk-cuckoo	Hierococcyx sparverioides	
Dark hawk-cuckoo	Hierococcyx bocki	
Common hawk-cuckoo	Hierococcyx varius	Accidental
Northern hawk-cuckoo	Hierococcyx hyperythrus	Accidental
Hodgson's hawk-cuckoo	Hierococcyx nisicolor	
Malaysian hawk-cuckoo	Hierococcyx fugax	
Lesser cuckoo	Cuculus poliocephalus	Very rare
Indian cuckoo	Cuculus micropterus	
Himalayan cuckoo	Cuculus saturatus	
Sunda cuckoo	Cuculus lepidus	
Common cuckoo	Cuculus canorus	
Oriental cuckoo	Cuculus optatus	Accidental

== Frogmouths ==
Order: Caprimulgiformes Family: Podargidae

The frogmouths are a group of nocturnal birds related to the nightjars. They are named for their large flattened hooked bill and huge frog-like gape, which they use to take insects.

Common name	Binomial	Status
Large frogmouth	Batrachostomus auritus	Very rare
Gould's frogmouth	Batrachostomus stellatus	Rare
Hodgson's frogmouth	Batrachostomus hodgsoni	
Blyth's frogmouth	Batrachostomus affinis	

== Nightjars and allies ==
Order: Caprimulgiformes Family: Caprimulgidae

Nightjars are medium-sized ground-nesting nocturnal birds with long wings, short legs, and very short bills. Most have small feet, of little use for walking, and long pointed wings. Their soft plumage is camouflaged to resemble bark or leaves.

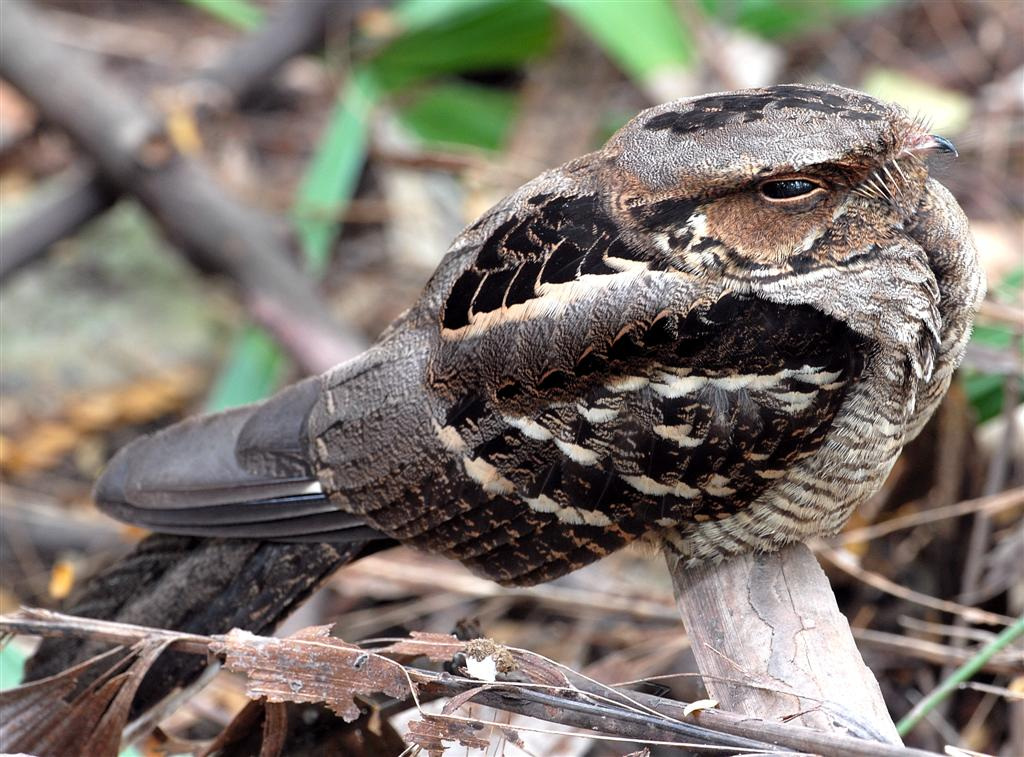
The large-tailed nightjar is a common resident of Thailand.

Common name	Binomial	Status
Malaysian eared-nightjar	Lyncornis temminckii	
Great eared-nightjar	Lyncornis macrotis	
Gray nightjar	Caprimulgus jotaka	Winter visitor, breeds in mountains
Large-tailed nightjar	Caprimulgus macrurus	
Indian nightjar	Caprimulgus asiaticus	
Savanna nightjar	Caprimulgus affinis	

== Swifts ==
Order: Caprimulgiformes Family: Apodidae

Swifts are small birds which spend the majority of their lives flying. These birds have very short legs and never settle voluntarily on the ground, perching instead only on vertical surfaces. Many swifts have long swept-back wings which resemble a crescent or boomerang.

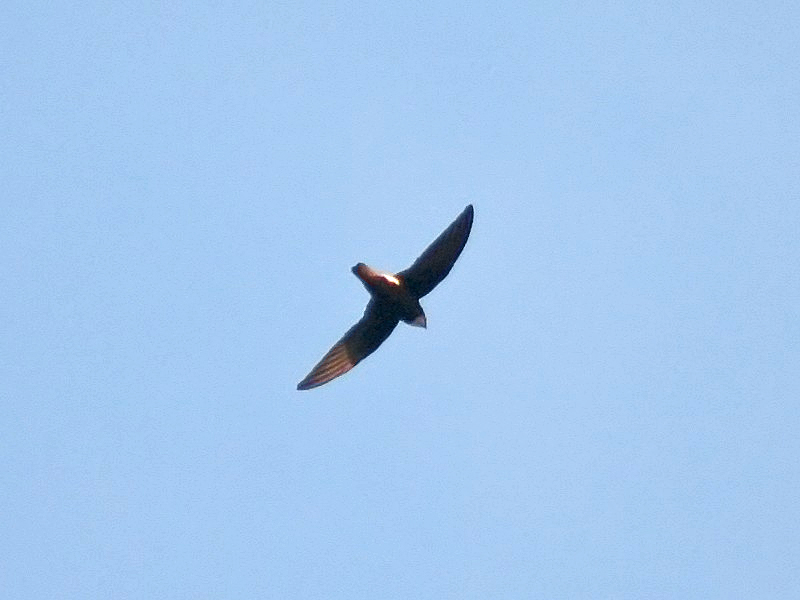
The house swift is a common resident of Thailand.

Common name	Binomial	Status
Silver-rumped needletail	Rhaphidura leucopygialis	
White-throated needletail	Hirundapus caudacutus	Rare migrant
Silver-backed needletail	Hirundapus cochinchinensis	Uncertain status
Brown-backed needletail	Hirundapus giganteus	
Plume-toed swiftlet	Collocalia affinis	Rare
Himalayan swiftlet	Aerodramus brevirostris	Breeds in highlands, winter visitor elsewhere
Black-nest swiftlet	Aerodramus maximus	
White-nest swiftlet	Aerodramus fuciphagus	
Germain's swiftlet	Aerodramus germani	
Common swift	Apus apus	Accidental
Pacific swift	Apus pacificus	Winter visitor, some breed
Cook's swift	Apus cooki	
Dark-rumped swift	Apus acuticauda	Very rare winter visitor
House swift	Apus nipalensis	
Asian palm-swift	Cypsiurus balasiensis	

== Treeswifts ==
Order: Caprimulgiformes Family: Hemiprocnidae

The treeswifts, also called crested swifts, are closely related to the true swifts. They differ from the true swifts in that they have crests, long forked tails, and soft plumage.

Common name	Binomial	Status
Crested treeswift	Hemiprocne coronata	
Gray-rumped treeswift	Hemiprocne longipennis	
Whiskered treeswift	Hemiprocne comata	

== Rails, gallinules, and coots ==
Order: Gruiformes Family: Rallidae

Rallidae is a large family of small to medium-sized birds which includes the rails, crakes, coots, and gallinules. Typically they inhabit dense vegetation in damp environments near lakes, swamps, or rivers. In general they are shy and secretive birds, making them difficult to observe. Most species have strong legs and long toes which are well adapted to soft uneven surfaces. They tend to have short, rounded wings and appear to be weak fliers.

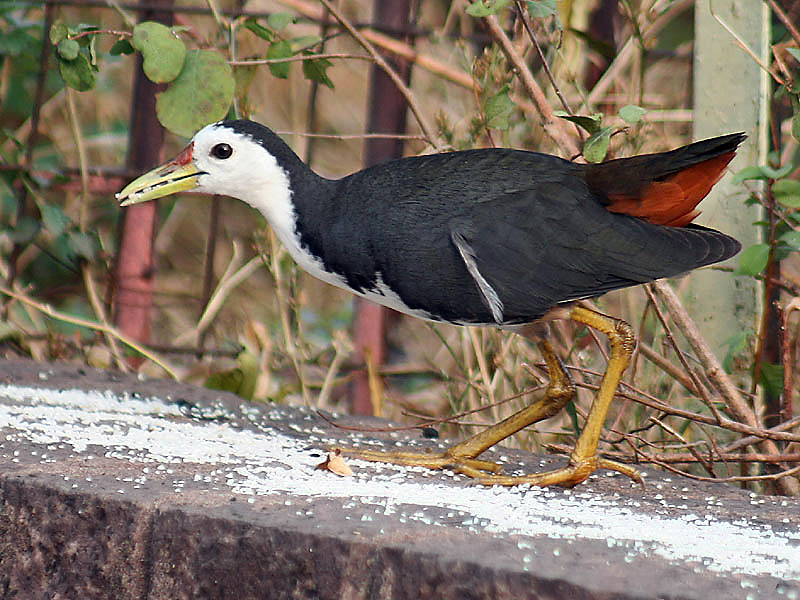
The white-breasted waterhen is a very common resident of Thailand.

Common name	Binomial	Status
Brown-cheeked rail	Rallus indicus	Winter visitor
Slaty-breasted rail	Lewinia striata	
Spotted crake	Porzana porzana	Very rare winter visitor
Eurasian moorhen	Gallinula chloropus	
Eurasian coot	Fulica atra	Winter visitor
Gray-headed swamphen	Porphyrio poliocephalus	
Watercock	Gallicrex cinerea	Summer visitor and resident
White-breasted waterhen	Amaurornis phoenicurus	
White-browed crake	Poliolimnas cinereus	
Red-legged crake	Rallina fasciata	
Slaty-legged crake	Rallina eurizonoides	Rare, mainly winter visitor
Ruddy-breasted crake	Zapornia fusca	
Band-bellied crake	Zapornia paykullii	Accidental
Baillon's crake	Zapornia pusilla	Winter visitor
Black-tailed crake	Zapornia bicolor	Rare

== Finfoots ==
Order: Gruiformes Family: Heliornithidae

Heliornithidae is small family of tropical birds with webbed lobes on their feet similar to those of grebes and coots.

Common name	Binomial	Status
Masked finfoot	Heliopais personatus	Winter visitor and passage migrant, endangered

== Cranes ==
Order: Gruiformes Family: Gruidae

Cranes are large, long-legged, and long-necked birds. Unlike the similar-looking but unrelated herons, cranes fly with necks outstretched, not pulled back. Most have elaborate and noisy courting displays or "dances".

Common name	Binomial	Status
Demoiselle crane	Anthropoides virgo	Accidental
Sarus crane	Antigone antigone	Extirpated; reintroduced in 2011
Common crane	Grus grus	

== Thick-knees ==
Order: Charadriiformes Family: Burhinidae

The thick-knees are found worldwide within the tropical zone, with some species also breeding in temperate Europe and Australia. They are medium to large waders with strong black or yellow-black bills, large yellow eyes, and cryptic plumage. Despite being classed as waders, most species have a preference for arid or semi-arid habitats.

Common name	Binomial	Status
Indian thick-knee	Burhinus indicus	
Great thick-knee	Esacus recurvirostris	
Beach thick-knee	Esacus magnirostris	Rare and local

== Stilts and avocets ==
Order: Charadriiformes Family: Recurvirostridae

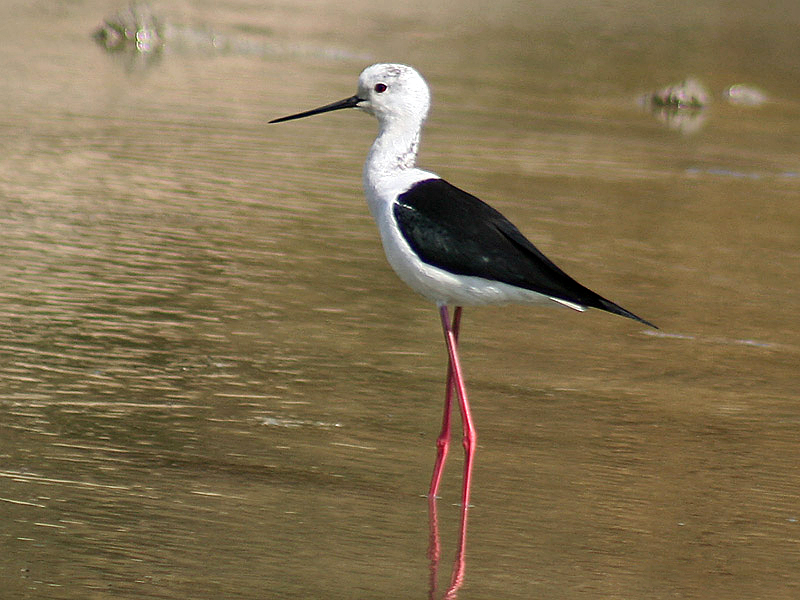
The black-winged stilt is common in wetlands.

Recurvirostridae is a family of large wading birds which includes the avocets and stilts. The avocets have long legs and long up-curved bills. The stilts have extremely long legs and long, thin, straight bills.

Common name	Binomial	Status
Black-winged stilt	Himantopus himantopus	Resident and winter visitor
Pied avocet	Recurvirostra avosetta	Accidental

== Oystercatchers ==
Order: Charadriiformes Family: Haematopodidae

The oystercatchers are large and noisy plover-like birds, with strong bills used for smashing or prising open molluscs.

Common name	Binomial	Status
Eurasian oystercatcher	Haematopus ostralegus	Accidental

== Plovers and lapwings ==
Order: Charadriiformes Family: Charadriidae

The family Charadriidae includes the plovers, dotterels, and lapwings. They are small to medium-sized birds with compact bodies, short thick necks, and long, usually pointed, wings. They are found in open country worldwide, mostly in habitats near water.

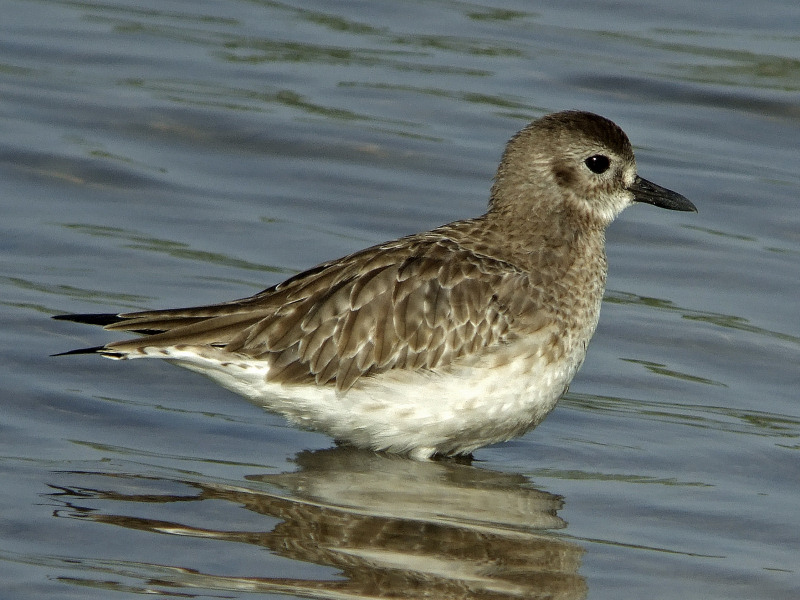
The black-bellied plover is a common winter visitor to Thailand.

Common name	Binomial	Status
Black-bellied plover	Pluvialis squatarola	Winter visitor
Pacific golden-plover	Pluvialis fulva	Winter visitor
Northern lapwing	Vanellus vanellus	Rare winter visitor
River lapwing	Vanellus duvaucelii	
Gray-headed lapwing	Vanellus cinereus	Winter visitor
Red-wattled lapwing	Vanellus indicus	
Lesser sand-plover	Charadrius mongolus	Winter visitor
Greater sand-plover	Charadrius leschenaultii	Winter visitor
Malaysian plover	Charadrius peronii	
Kentish plover	Charadrius alexandrinus	Winter visitor
White-faced plover	Charadrius dealbatus	Winter visitor
Common ringed plover	Charadrius hiaticula	Accidental
Long-billed plover	Charadrius placidus	Rare winter visitor
Little ringed plover	Charadrius dubius	Winter visitor
Oriental plover	Charadrius veredus	

== Painted-snipes ==
Order: Charadriiformes Family: Rostratulidae

Painted-snipes are short-legged, long-billed birds similar in shape to the true snipes, but more brightly coloured.

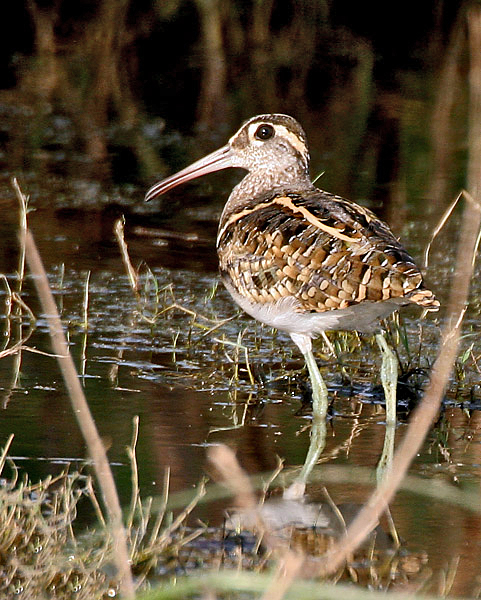
The greater painted-snipe is one of the few bird species in which the female (pictured) is brighter than the male.

Common name	Binomial	Status
Greater painted-snipe	Rostratula benghalensis	

== Jacanas ==
Order: Charadriiformes Family: Jacanidae

The jacanas are a group of waders found throughout the tropics. They are identifiable by their huge feet and claws which enable them to walk on floating vegetation in the shallow lakes that are their preferred habitat.

Common name	Binomial	Status
Pheasant-tailed jacana	Hydrophasianus chirurgus	Winter visitor and resident
Bronze-winged jacana	Metopidius indicus	

== Sandpipers and allies ==
Order: Charadriiformes Family: Scolopacidae

Scolopacidae is a large diverse family of small to medium-sized shorebirds including the sandpipers, curlews, godwits, shanks, tattlers, woodcocks, snipes, dowitchers, and phalaropes. The majority of these species eat small invertebrates picked out of the mud or soil. Variation in length of legs and bills enables multiple species to feed in the same habitat, particularly on the coast, without direct competition for food.

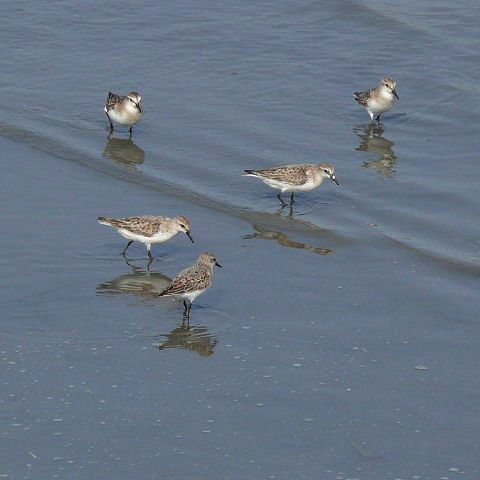
The red-necked stint is a very common winter visitor of Thailand.

Common name	Binomial	Status
Whimbrel	Numenius phaeopus	Winter visitor
Little curlew	Numenius minutus	Very rare passage migrant
Far Eastern curlew	Numenius madagascariensis	Rare passage migrant, endangered
Eurasian curlew	Numenius arquata	Winter visitor
Bar-tailed godwit	Limosa lapponica	Winter visitor
Black-tailed godwit	Limosa limosa	Winter visitor
Ruddy turnstone	Arenaria interpres	Winter visitor
Great knot	Calidris tenuirostris	Mainly passage migrant, endangered
Red knot	Calidris canutus	Winter visitor
Ruff	Calidris pugnax	Winter and passage visitor
Broad-billed sandpiper	Calidris falcinellus	Winter visitor
Sharp-tailed sandpiper	Calidris acuminata	Very rare winter visitor
Curlew sandpiper	Calidris ferruginea	Winter visitor
Temminck's stint	Calidris temminckii	Winter visitor
Long-toed stint	Calidris subminuta	Winter visitor
Spoon-billed sandpiper	Calidris pygmaea	Rare on passage and in winter, critically endangered
Red-necked stint	Calidris ruficollis	Common winter visitor
Sanderling	Calidris alba	Winter visitor
Dunlin	Calidris alpina	Rare winter visitor
Little stint	Calidris minuta	Rare in winter
Pectoral sandpiper	Calidris melanotos	Accidental
Asian dowitcher	Limnodromus semipalmatus	Rare on passage
Long-billed dowitcher	Limnodromus scolopaceus	Accidental
Jack snipe	Lymnocryptes minimus	Rare winter visitor
Eurasian woodcock	Scolopax rusticola	Winter visitor
Wood snipe	Gallinago nemoricola	Very rare winter visitor
Common snipe	Gallinago gallinago	Winter visitor
Pin-tailed snipe	Gallinago stenura	Winter visitor
Swinhoe's snipe	Gallinago megala	Very rare winter visitor
Terek sandpiper	Xenus cinereus	Winter visitor
Red-necked phalarope	Phalaropus lobatus	Rare in winter or on passage
Red phalarope	Phalaropus fulicarius	Rare in winter or on passage
Common sandpiper	Actitis hypoleucos	Winter visitor
Green sandpiper	Tringa ochropus	Winter visitor
Gray-tailed tattler	Tringa brevipes	Rare on passage
Spotted redshank	Tringa erythropus	Winter visitor
Common greenshank	Tringa nebularia	Winter visitor
Nordmann's greenshank	Tringa guttifer	Rare winter visitor, endangered
Marsh sandpiper	Tringa stagnatilis	Winter visitor
Wood sandpiper	Tringa glareola	Winter visitor
Common redshank	Tringa totanus	Winter visitor

== Buttonquail ==
Order: Charadriiformes Family: Turnicidae

The buttonquail are small, drab, running birds which resemble the true quails. The female is the brighter of the sexes and initiates courtship. The male incubates the eggs and tends the young.

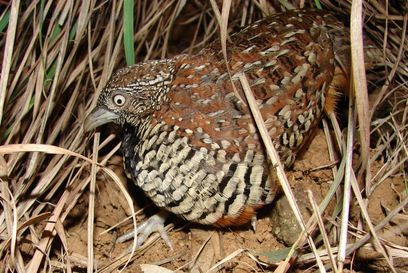
The barred buttonquail is a common resident of Thailand.

Common name	Binomial	Status
Small buttonquail	Turnix sylvaticus	
Yellow-legged buttonquail	Turnix tanki	
Barred buttonquail	Turnix suscitator	

== Crab-plover ==
Order: Charadriiformes Family: Dromadidae

The crab-plover is related to the waders, but is the only member of its family. It resembles a plover but has very long grey legs and a strong black bill similar to that of a tern. It has black-and-white plumage, a long neck, partially webbed feet, and a bill designed for eating crabs.

Common name	Binomial	Status
Crab-plover	Dromas ardeola	Rare but annual in winter

== Pratincoles and coursers ==
Order: Charadriiformes Family: Glareolidae

Glareolidae is a family of wading birds comprising the pratincoles, which have short legs, long pointed wings, and long forked tails, and the coursers, which have long legs, short wings, and long, pointed bills which curve downwards.

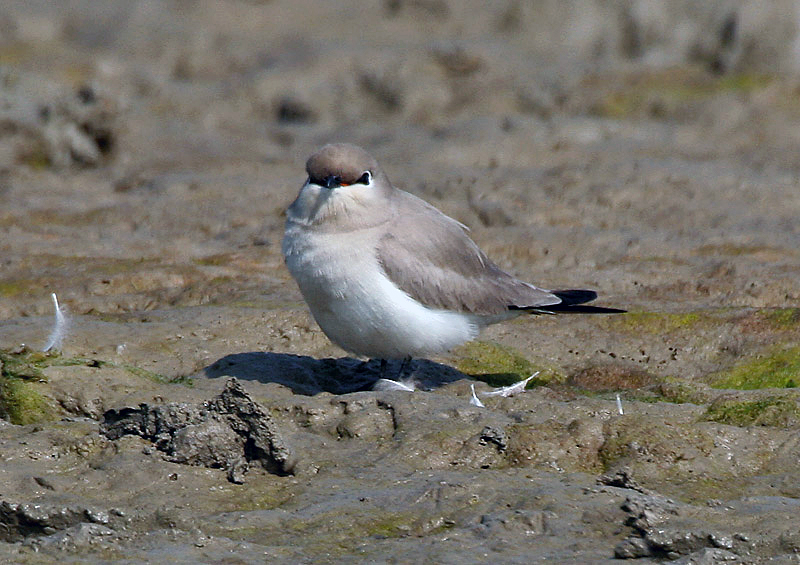
The small pratincole is a wader that hunts insects in flight.

Common name	Binomial	Status
Collared pratincole	Glareola pratincola	Accidental
Oriental pratincole	Glareola maldivarum	Summer visitor
Small pratincole	Glareola lactea	Resident and winter visitor

== Skuas and jaegers ==
Order: Charadriiformes Family: Stercorariidae

The family Stercorariidae are, in general, medium to large birds, typically with grey or brown plumage, often with white markings on the wings. They nest on the ground in temperate and arctic regions and are long-distance migrants.

Common name	Binomial	Status
Pomarine jaeger	Stercorarius pomarinus	Winter visitor
Parasitic jaeger	Stercorarius parasiticus	Rare winter visitor
Long-tailed jaeger	Stercorarius longicaudus	

== Auks, murres, and puffins ==
Order: Charadriiformes Family: Alcidae

Alcids are superficially similar to penguins due to their black-and-white colours, their upright posture and some of their habits, however they are not related to the penguins and differ in being able to fly. Auks live on the open sea, only deliberately coming ashore to nest.

Common name	Binomial	Status
Ancient murrelet	Synthliboramphus antiquus	Accidental

== Gulls, terns, and skimmers ==
Order: Charadriiformes Family: Laridae

Laridae is a family of medium to large seabirds, the gulls, terns, and skimmers. They are typically grey or white, often with black markings on the head or wings. They have stout, longish bills and webbed feet. Terns are a group of generally medium to large seabirds typically with grey or white plumage, often with black markings on the head. Most terns hunt fish by diving but some pick insects off the surface of fresh water. Terns are generally long-lived birds, with several species known to live in excess of 30 years. Skimmers are a small family of tropical tern-like birds. They have an elongated lower mandible which they use to feed by flying low over the water surface and skimming the water for small fish.

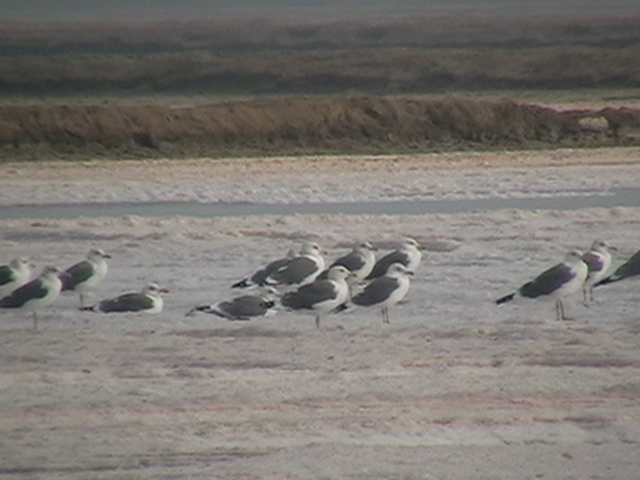
Heuglin's gull is an uncommon winter visitor of Thailand.

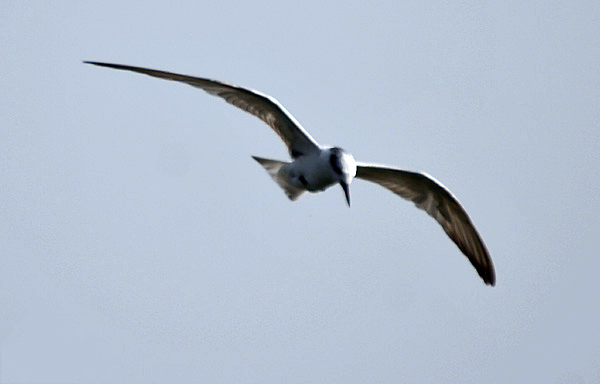
The whiskered tern is a very common winter visitor of Thailand.

Common name	Binomial	Status
Black-legged kittiwake	Rissa tridactyla	Accidental
Sabine's gull	Xema sabini	Accidental
Slender-billed gull	Chroicocephalus genei	Very rare winter visitor
Black-headed gull	Chroicocephalus ridibundus	Winter visitor
Brown-headed gull	Chroicocephalus brunnicephalus	Rare winter visitor
Little gull	Hydrocoloeus minutus	Accidental
Sooty gull	Ichthyaetus hemprichii	Accidental
Pallas's gull	Ichthyaetus ichthyaetus	Very rare winter visitor
Black-tailed gull	Larus crassirostris	Very rare winter visitor
Common gull	Larus canus	
Herring gull	Larus argentatus	
Caspian gull	Larus cachinnans	Accidental
Lesser black-backed gull	Larus fuscus	Accidental
Slaty-backed gull	Larus schistisagus	Accidental
Brown noddy	Anous stolidus	
Sooty tern	Onychoprion fuscatus	
Bridled tern	Onychoprion anaethetus	
Aleutian tern	Onychoprion aleuticus	Accidental
Little tern	Sternula albifrons	
Gull-billed tern	Gelochelidon nilotica	Winter visitor
Caspian tern	Hydroprogne caspia	Winter visitor
White-winged tern	Chlidonias leucopterus	Winter visitor
Whiskered tern	Chlidonias hybrida	
Roseate tern	Sterna dougallii	
Black-naped tern	Sterna sumatrana	
Common tern	Sterna hirundo	Winter visitor
Arctic tern	Sterna paradisaea	Accidental
Black-bellied tern	Sterna acuticauda	Extirpated
River tern	Sterna aurantia	
Great crested tern	Thalasseus bergii	
Lesser crested tern	Thalasseus bengalensis	Rare winter visitor
Chinese crested tern	Thalasseus bernsteini	Accidental, critically endangered
Indian skimmer	Rynchops albicollis	

== Tropicbirds ==
Order: Phaethontiformes Family: Phaethontidae

Tropicbirds are slender white birds of tropical oceans with exceptionally long central tail feathers. Their heads and long wings have black markings.

Common name	Binomial	Status
White-tailed tropicbird	Phaethon lepturus	Accidental
Red-billed tropicbird	Phaethon aethereus	Accidental
Red-tailed tropicbird	Phaethon rubricauda	Accidental

== Albatrosses ==
Order: Procellariiformes Family: Diomedeidae

The albatrosses are among the largest of flying birds, and the great albatrosses of the genus Diomedea have the largest wingspans of any extant birds.

Common name	Binomial	Status
Laysan albatross	Phoebastria immutabilis	Accidental

== Northern storm-petrels ==
Order: Procellariiformes Family: Hydrobatidae

Storm-petrels are small birds which spend most of their lives at sea, coming ashore only to breed. They feed on planktonic crustaceans and small fish picked from the surface, typically while hovering or pattering across the water. Their flight is fluttering and sometimes bat-like.

Common name	Binomial	Status
Swinhoe's storm-petrel	Hydrobates monorhis	Accidental

== Shearwaters and petrels ==
Order: Procellariiformes Family: Procellariidae

The procellariids are the main group of medium-sized "true petrels", characterised by united nostrils with medium septum and a long outer functional primary.

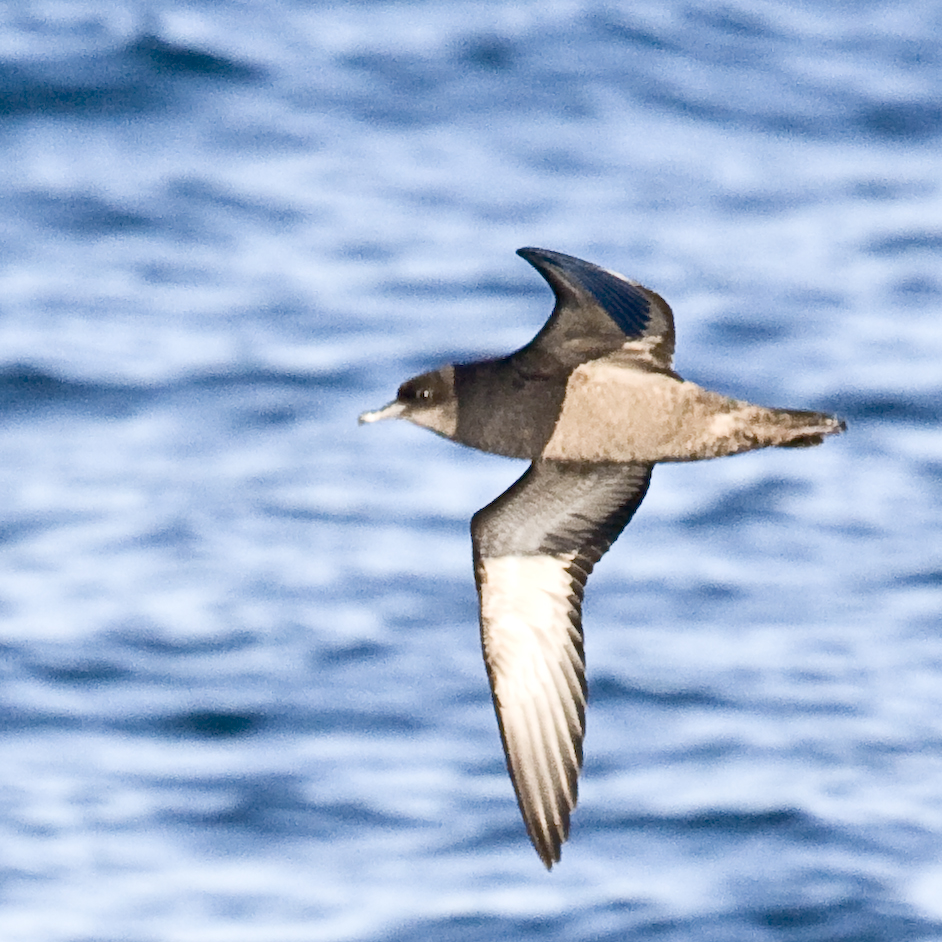
The short-tailed shearwater is a long-distance migrant occasionally recorded in Thailand.

Common name	Binomial	Status
Northern fulmar	Fulmarus glacialis	Accidental
White-necked petrel	Pterodroma cervicalis	Accidental
Streaked shearwater	Calonectris leucomelas	Very rare winter visitor
Wedge-tailed shearwater	Ardenna pacificus	Accidental
Short-tailed shearwater	Ardenna tenuirostris	Accidental

== Storks ==
Order: Ciconiiformes Family: Ciconiidae

Storks are large, long-legged, long-necked, wading birds with long, stout bills. Storks are virtually mute, but bill-clattering is an important mode of communication at the nest. Their nests can be large and may be reused for many years. Many species are migratory.

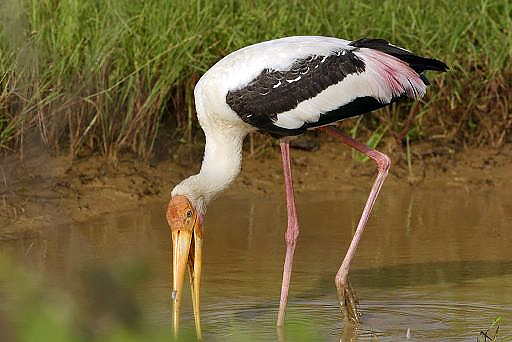
The painted stork is now a populated resident and actively breed in Thailand.

Common name	Binomial	Status
Asian openbill	Anastomus oscitans	
Black stork	Ciconia nigra	Rare winter visitor
Asian woolly-necked stork	Ciconia episcopus	
Storm's stork	Ciconia stormi	Endangered
White stork	Ciconia ciconia	Accidental
Oriental stork	Ciconia boyciana	Endangered
Black-necked stork	Ephippiorhynchus asiaticus	Extirpated
Lesser adjutant	Leptoptilos javanicus	Rare
Greater adjutant	Leptoptilos dubius	Extirpated, endangered
Milky stork	Mycteria cinerea	Introduced, endangered
Painted stork	Mycteria leucocephala	

== Frigatebirds ==
Order: Suliformes Family: Fregatidae

Frigatebirds are large seabirds usually found over tropical oceans. They are large, black-and-white, or completely black, with long wings and deeply forked tails. The males have coloured inflatable throat pouches. They do not swim or walk and cannot take off from a flat surface. Having the largest wingspan-to-body-weight ratio of any bird, they are essentially aerial, able to stay aloft for more than a week.

Common name	Binomial	Status
Lesser frigatebird	Fregata ariel	Winter visitor
Christmas Island frigatebird	Fregata andrewsi	Winter visitor, critically endangered
Great frigatebird	Fregata minor	Rare

== Boobies and gannets ==
Order: Suliformes Family: Sulidae

The gannets and boobies are medium to large coastal seabirds that plunge-dive for fish.

Common name	Binomial	Status
Masked booby	Sula dactylatra	
Brown booby	Sula leucogaster	Extirpated, formerly bred
Red-footed booby	Sula sula	Accidental

== Anhingas ==
Order: Suliformes Family: Anhingidae

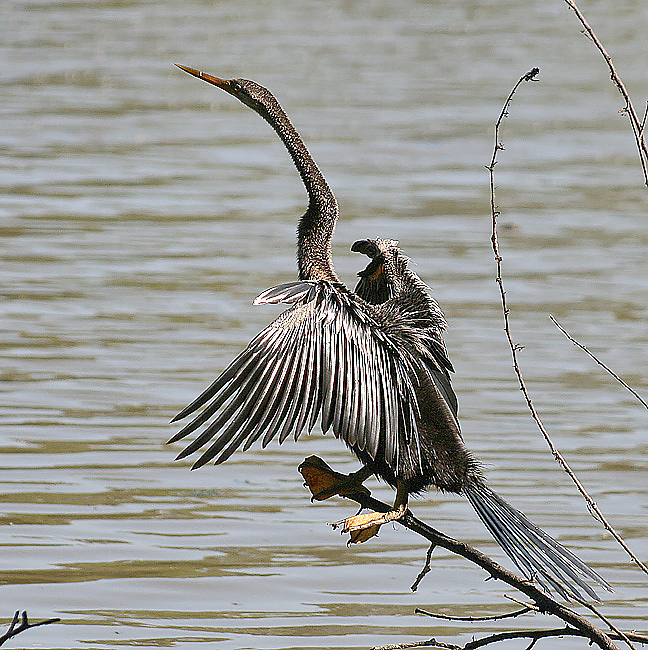
Adult Oriental darters are rare visitors to Thailand.

Anhingas or darters are often called "snake-birds" because they have long thin necks, which gives a snake-like appearance when they swim with their bodies submerged. The males have black and dark-brown plumage, an erectile crest on the nape and a larger bill than the female. The females have much paler plumage, especially, on the neck and underparts. The darters have completely webbed feet and their legs are short and set far back on the body. Their plumage is somewhat permeable, like that of cormorants, and they spread their wings to dry after diving.

Common name	Binomial	Status
Oriental darter	Anhinga melanogaster	Rare

== Cormorants and shags ==
Order: Suliformes Family: Phalacrocoracidae

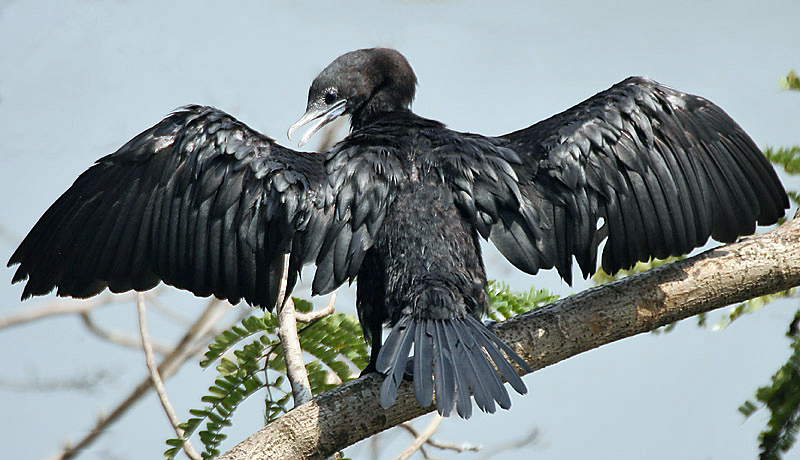
The little cormorant is a resident breeding species of Thailand.

The Phalacrocoracidae are a family of medium to large fish-eating birds that includes cormorants and shags. Plumage colouration varies; the majority of species have mainly dark plumage, but some are pied black and white, and a few are more colourful.

Common name	Binomial	Status
Little cormorant	Microcarbo niger	
Great cormorant	Phalacrocorax carbo	
Indian cormorant	Phalacrocorax fuscicollis	Rare winter visitor, formerly bred

== Pelicans ==
Order: Pelecaniformes Family: Pelecanidae

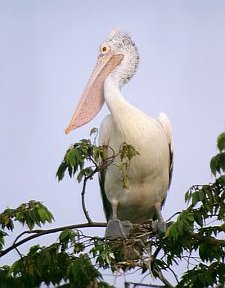
The spot-billed pelican, once common, is now rare.

Pelicans are large water birds with a distinctive pouch under their beak. They have webbed feet with four toes.

Common name	Binomial	Status
Great white pelican	Pelecanus onocrotalus	Vagrant
Spot-billed pelican	Pelecanus philippensis	Rare, probably once bred

== Herons, egrets, and bitterns ==
Order: Pelecaniformes Family: Ardeidae

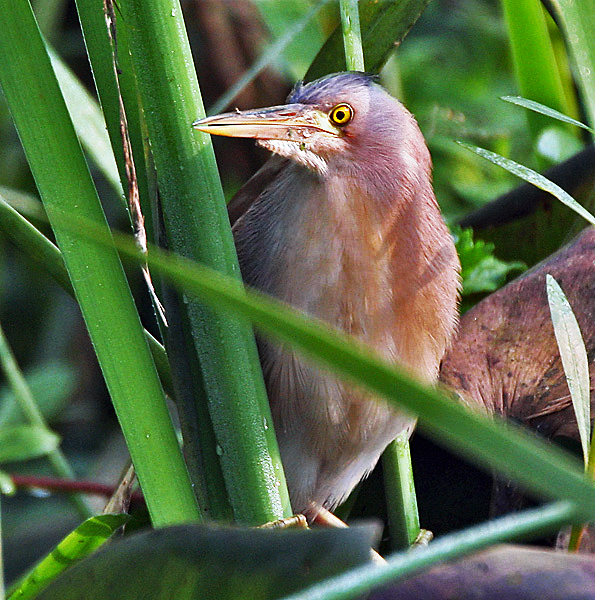
The yellow bittern is a very common resident and winter visitor of Thailand.

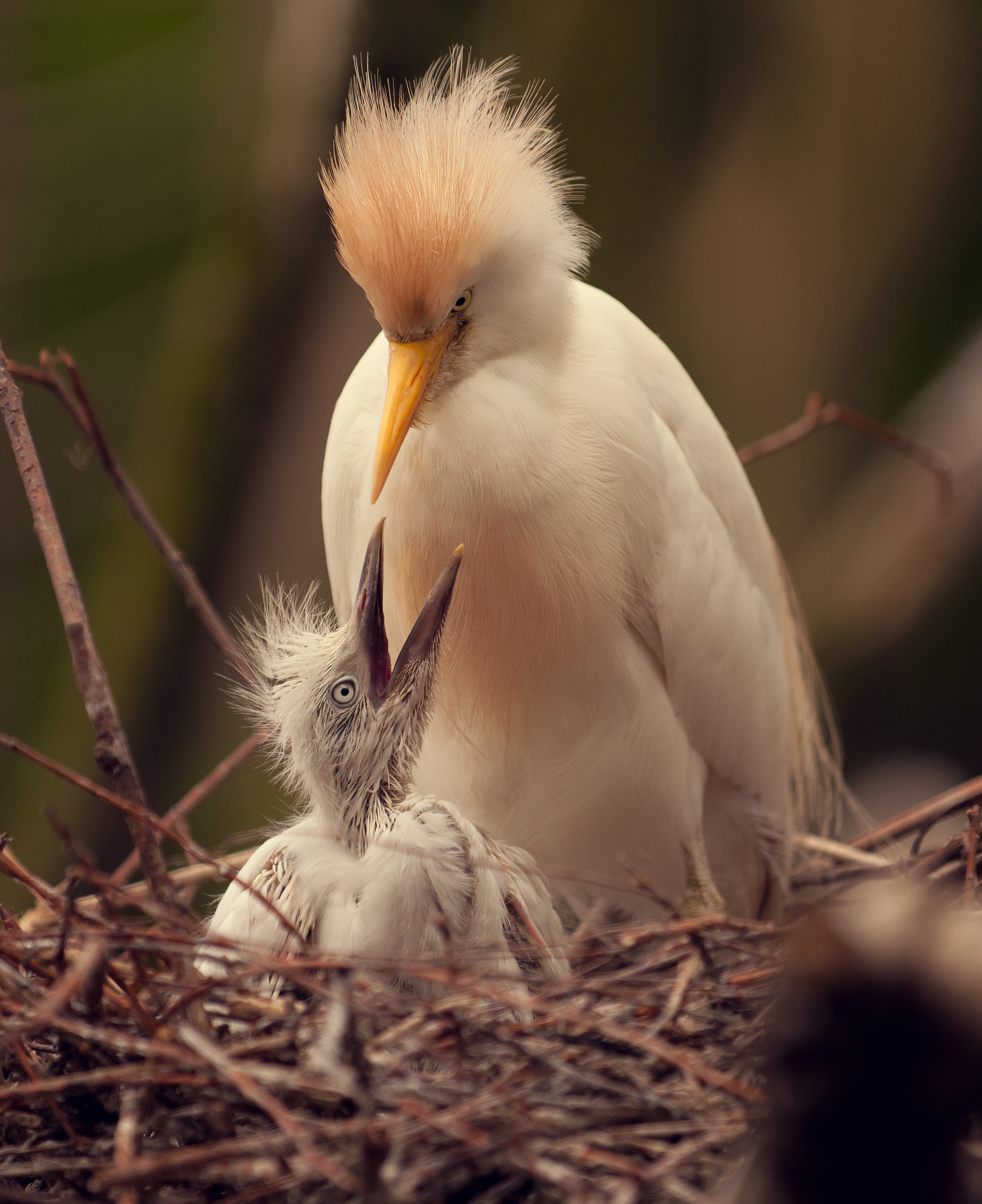
The cattle egret has naturally colonised Thailand.

The family Ardeidae contains the bitterns, herons, and egrets. Herons and egrets are medium to large wading birds with long necks and legs. Bitterns tend to be shorter necked and more wary. Unlike other long-necked birds such as storks, ibises, and spoonbills, members of this family fly with their necks retracted.

Common name	Binomial	Status
Great bittern	Botaurus stellaris	Winter visitor
Yellow bittern	Ixobrychus sinensis	
Schrenck's bittern	Ixobrychus eurhythmus	Passage migrant
Cinnamon bittern	Ixobrychus cinnamomeus	
Black bittern	Ixobrychus flavicollis	
Gray heron	Ardea cinerea	Winter visitor, formerly bred
Great-billed heron	Ardea sumatrana	Now very rare
Purple heron	Ardea purpurea	Winter visitor
Great egret	Ardea alba	
Intermediate egret	Ardea intermedia	Winter visitor
Chinese egret	Egretta eulophotes	Very rare winter visitor
Little egret	Egretta garzetta	
Pacific reef-heron	Egretta sacra	
Eastern cattle egret	Ardea coromanda	
Indian pond-heron	Ardeola grayii	
Chinese pond-heron	Ardeola bacchus	Winter visitor
Javan pond-heron	Ardeola speciosa	
Striated heron	Butorides striata	
Black-crowned night-heron	Nycticorax nycticorax	
Malayan night-heron	Gorsachius melanolophus	

== Ibises and spoonbills ==
Order: Pelecaniformes Family: Threskiornithidae

Threskiornithidae is a family of large terrestrial and wading birds which comprises the ibises and spoonbills. Its members have long, broad wings with 11 primary and about 20 secondary flight feathers. They are strong fliers and, despite their size and weight, very capable soarers.

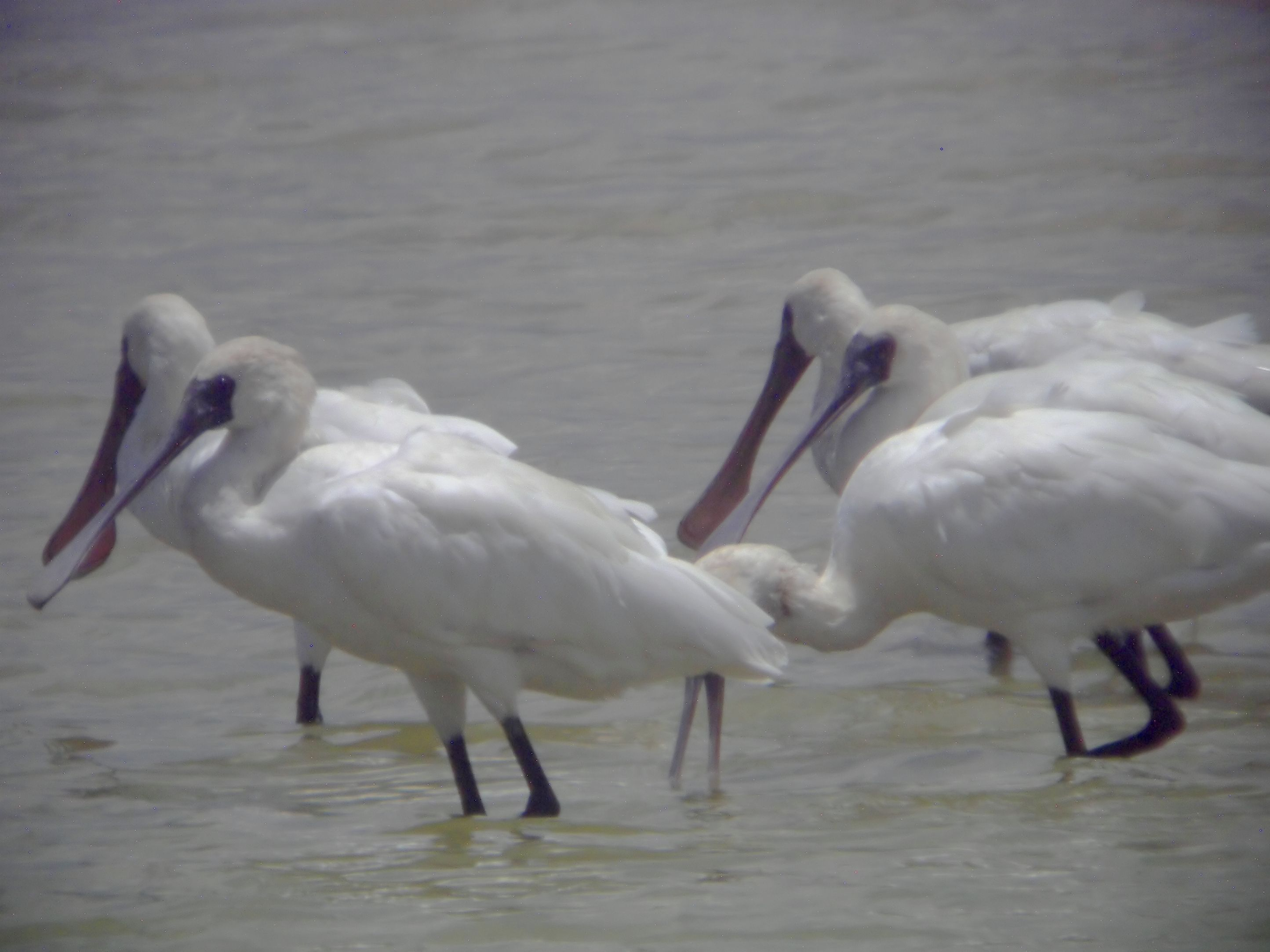
The black-faced spoonbill is a rare winter visitor of Thailand.

Common name	Binomial	Status
Glossy ibis	Plegadis falcinellus	
African sacred ibis	Threskiornis aethiopicus	Introduced species
Black-headed ibis	Threskiornis melanocephalus	
White-shouldered ibis	Pseudibis davisoni	Extirpated, critically endangered
Giant ibis	Pseudibis gigantea	Extirpated, critically endangered
Eurasian spoonbill	Platalea leucorodia	Very rare winter visitor
Black-faced spoonbill	Platalea minor	Very rare winter visitor, endangered

== Osprey ==
Order: Accipitriformes Family: Pandionidae

The family Pandionidae contains only one species, the osprey. The osprey is a medium-large raptor which is a specialist fish-eater with a worldwide distribution.

Common name	Binomial	Status
Osprey	Pandion haliaetus	Winter visitor

== Hawks, eagles, and kites ==
Order: Accipitriformes Family: Accipitridae

Accipitridae is a family of birds of prey which includes hawks, eagles, kites, harriers, and Old World vultures. These birds mostly have powerful hooked beaks for tearing flesh from their prey, strong legs, powerful talons, and keen eyesight.

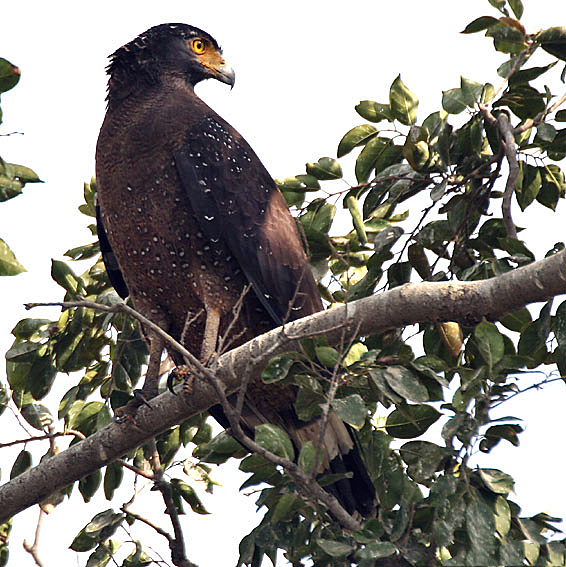
The crested serpent-eagle is a common resident of Thailand.

Common name	Binomial	Status
Black-winged kite	Elanus caeruleus	
Oriental honey-buzzard	Pernis ptilorhynchus	
Jerdon's baza	Aviceda jerdoni	
Black baza	Aviceda leuphotes	
Red-headed vulture	Sarcogyps calvus	Critically endangered, Accidental
Cinereous vulture	Aegypius monachus	Rare winter visitor
White-rumped vulture	Gyps bengalensis	Possibly extirpated, critically endangered
Slender-billed vulture	Gyps tenuirostris	Extirpated, critically endangered
Himalayan griffon	Gyps himalayensis	Accidental
Crested serpent-eagle	Spilornis cheela	
Short-toed snake-eagle	Circaetus gallicus	Rare passage migrant and winter visitor
Bat hawk	Macheiramphus alcinus	
Changeable hawk-eagle	Nisaetus cirrhatus	
Mountain hawk-eagle	Nisaetus nipalensis	
Blyth's hawk-eagle	Nisaetus alboniger	
Wallace's hawk-eagle	Nisaetus nanus	
Rufous-bellied eagle	Lophotriorchis kienerii	
Black eagle	Ictinaetus malaiensis	
Indian spotted eagle	Clanga hastata	Accidental
Greater spotted eagle	Clanga clanga	Uncommon passage migrant and winter visitor
Booted eagle	Hieraaetus pennatus	Rare passage migrant and winter visitor
Steppe eagle	Aquila nipalensis	Accidental, endangered
Imperial eagle	Aquila heliaca	Rare winter visitor
Bonelli's eagle	Aquila fasciata	Rare
White-eyed buzzard	Butastur teesa	Accidental
Rufous-winged buzzard	Butastur liventer	
Gray-faced buzzard	Butastur indicus	Passage migrant and winter visitor
Eurasian marsh-harrier	Circus aeruginosus	Rare winter visitor
Eastern marsh-harrier	Circus spilonotus	Winter visitor
Hen harrier	Circus cyaneus	Rare winter visitor
Pallid harrier	Circus macrourus	Accidental
Pied harrier	Circus melanoleucos	Winter visitor
Crested goshawk	Accipiter trivirgatus	
Shikra	Accipiter badius	
Chinese sparrowhawk	Accipiter soloensis	Passage migrant and winter visitor
Japanese sparrowhawk	Accipiter gularis	Passage migrant and winter visitor
Besra	Accipiter virgatus	
Eurasian sparrowhawk	Accipiter nisus	Rare winter visitor
Northern goshawk	Astur gentilis	Rare winter visitor
Black kite	Milvus migrans	Winter visitor, some breed
Brahminy kite	Haliastur indus	
White-tailed eagle	Haliaeetus albicilla	Accidental
Pallas's fish-eagle	Haliaeetus leucoryphus	Accidental, possibly extirpated endangered
White-bellied sea-eagle	Haliaeetus leucogaster	
Lesser fish-eagle	Ichthyophaga humilis	Rare resident
Gray-headed fish-eagle	Ichthyophaga ichthyaetus	Very rare
Common buzzard	Buteo buteo	
Himalayan buzzard	Buteo refectus	
Eastern buzzard	Buteo japonicus	Winter visitor
Long-legged buzzard	Buteo rufinus	Accidental

== Barn-owls ==
Order: Strigiformes Family: Tytonidae

Barn-owls are medium to large owls with large heads and characteristic heart-shaped faces. They have long strong legs with powerful talons.

Common name	Binomial	Status
Australasian grass-owl	Tyto longimembris	
Eastern barn owl	Tyto javanica	
Oriental bay-owl	Phodilus badius	

== Owls ==
Order: Strigiformes Family: Strigidae

The typical owls are small to large solitary nocturnal birds of prey. They have large forward-facing eyes and ears, a hawk-like beak, and a conspicuous circle of feathers around each eye called a facial disk.

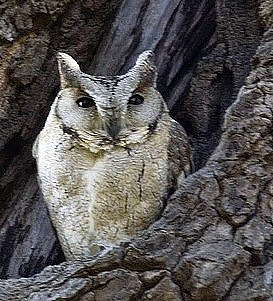
The collared scops-owl is a very common resident of Thailand.

Common name	Binomial	Status
White-fronted scops-owl	Otus sagittatus	Rare
Reddish scops-owl	Otus rufescens	Rare
Mountain scops-owl	Otus spilocephalus	
Collared scops-owl	Otus lettia	
Sunda scops-owl	Otus lempiji	
Oriental scops-owl	Otus sunia	
Spot-bellied eagle-owl	Bubo nipalensis	
Barred eagle-owl	Bubo sumatranus	
Dusky eagle-owl	Bubo coromandus	Very rare
Brown fish-owl	Ketupa zeylonensis	
Buffy fish-owl	Ketupa ketupu	
Collared owlet	Taenioptynx brodiei	
Asian barred owlet	Glaucidium cuculoides	
Collared owlet	Taenioptynx brodiei	
Spotted owlet	Athene brama	
Spotted wood-owl	Strix seloputo	
Brown wood-owl	Strix leptogrammica	
Short-eared owl	Asio flammeus	Very rare winter visitor
Brown boobook	Ninox scutulata	
Northern boobook	Ninox japonica	Accidental

== Trogons ==
Order: Trogoniformes Family: Trogonidae

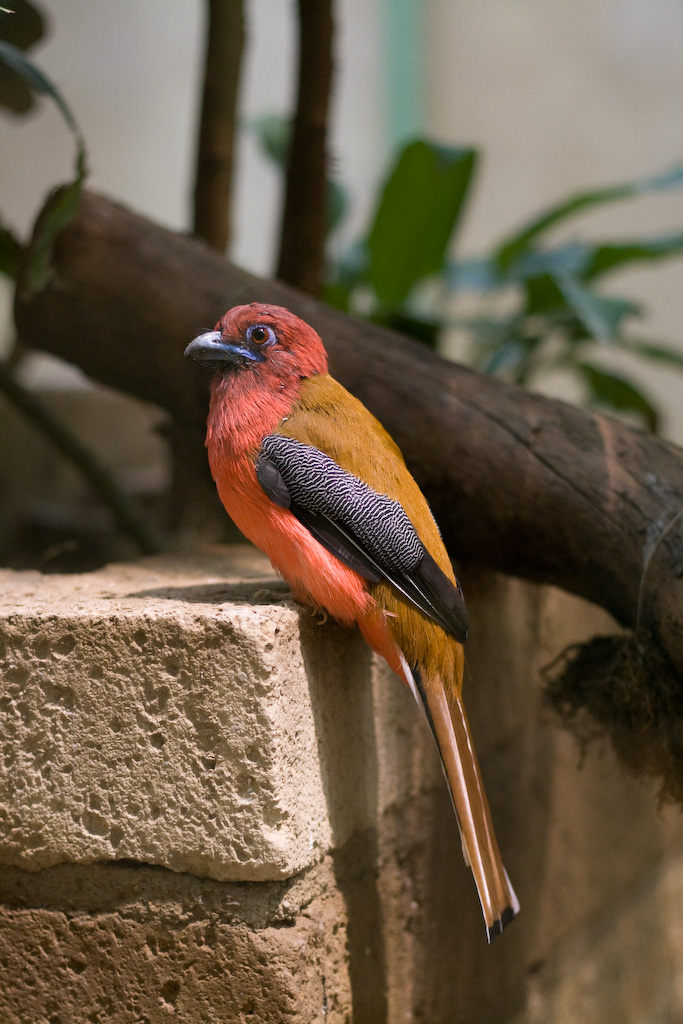
The red-headed trogon is a common resident of Thailand.

The family Trogonidae includes the trogons and quetzals. Found in tropical woodlands worldwide, they feed on insects and fruit, and their broad bills and weak legs reflect their diet and arboreal habits. Although their flight is fast, they are reluctant to fly any distance. Trogons have soft, often colourful, feathers with distinctive male and female plumage.

Common name	Binomial	Status
Red-naped trogon	Harpactes kasumba	Rare
Diard's trogon	Harpactes diardii	
Cinnamon-rumped trogon	Harpactes orrhophaeus	Rare
Scarlet-rumped trogon	Harpactes duvaucelii	
Red-headed trogon	Harpactes erythrocephalus	
Orange-breasted trogon	Harpactes oreskios	

== Hoopoes ==
Order: Bucerotiformes Family: Upupidae

Hoopoes have black, white, and pink plumage and a large erectile crest on the head.

Common name	Binomial	Status
Eurasian hoopoe	Upupa epops	

== Hornbills ==
Order: Bucerotiformes Family: Bucerotidae

Hornbills are a group of birds whose bill is shaped like a cow's horn, but without a twist, sometimes with a casque on the upper mandible. Frequently, the bill is brightly coloured.

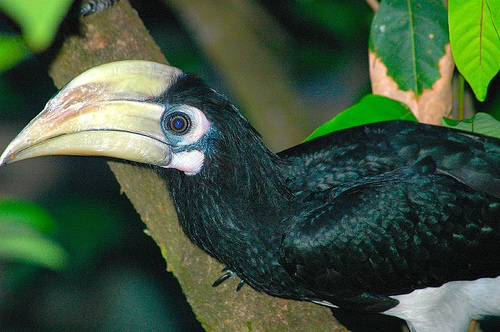
The Oriental pied-hornbill is a fairly common resident of Thailand.

Common name	Binomial	Status
White-crowned hornbill	Berenicornis comatus	Endangered
Helmeted hornbill	Buceros vigil	Critically endangered
Rhinoceros hornbill	Buceros rhinoceros	Rare, far south
Great hornbill	Buceros bicornis	
Bushy-crested hornbill	Anorrhinus galeritus	
Brown hornbill	Anorrhinus austeni	
Rusty-cheeked hornbill	Anorrhinus tickelli	
Black hornbill	Anthracoceros malayanus	Rare
Oriental pied-hornbill	Anthracoceros albirostris	
Rufous-necked hornbill	Aceros nipalensis	Rare
Wreathed hornbill	Rhyticeros undulatus	
Plain-pouched hornbill	Rhyticeros subruficollis	Rare
Wrinkled hornbill	Rhabdotorrhinus corrugatus	Endangered

== Kingfishers ==
Order: Coraciiformes Family: Alcedinidae

Kingfishers are medium-sized birds with large heads, long, pointed bills, short legs, and stubby tails.

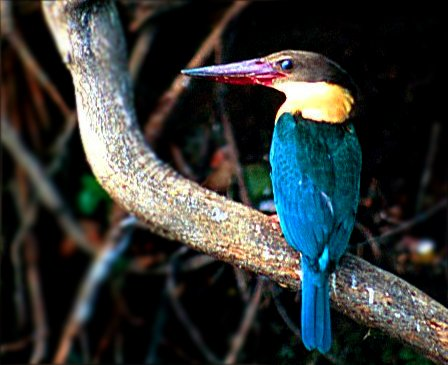
The stork-billed kingfisher is an uncommon resident of Thailand.

Common name	Binomial	Status
Blyth's kingfisher	Alcedo hercules	Very rare winter visitor
Common kingfisher	Alcedo atthis	Very common winter visitor
Blue-eared kingfisher	Alcedo meninting	
Malaysian blue-banded kingfisher	Alcedo peninsulae	
Black-backed dwarf-kingfisher	Ceyx erithaca	
Rufous-backed dwarf-kingfisher	Ceyx rufidorsa	
Banded kingfisher	Lacedo pulchella	
Brown-winged kingfisher	Pelargopsis amauroptera	
Stork-billed kingfisher	Pelargopsis capensis	
Ruddy kingfisher	Halcyon coromanda	
White-throated kingfisher	Halcyon smyrnensis	
Black-capped kingfisher	Halcyon pileata	Winter visitor and passage migrant
Sacred kingfisher	Todiramphus sanctus	Accidental
Collared kingfisher	Todirhamphus chloris	
Rufous-collared kingfisher	Actenoides concretus	Rare and reduced
Crested kingfisher	Megaceryle lugubris	
Pied kingfisher	Ceryle rudis	

== Bee-eaters ==
Order: Coraciiformes Family: Meropidae

The bee-eaters are a group of near passerine birds. Most species are found in Africa but others occur in southern Europe, southern Asia, Australia and New Guinea. They are characterised by richly coloured plumage, slender bodies, and usually elongated central tail feathers. All are colourful and have long down-turned bills and pointed wings, which give them a swallow-like appearance when seen from afar.

Common name	Binomial	Status
Red-bearded bee-eater	Nyctyornis amictus	
Blue-bearded bee-eater	Nyctyornis athertoni	
Asian green bee-eater	Merops orientalis	
Blue-throated bee-eater	Merops viridis	Resident, winter visitor and passage migrant
Blue-tailed bee-eater	Merops philippinus	Resident, winter visitor and passage migrant
Chestnut-headed bee-eater	Merops leschenaulti	

== Rollers ==
Order: Coraciiformes Family: Coraciidae

Rollers resemble crows in size and build, but are more closely related to the kingfishers and bee-eaters. They share the colourful appearance of those groups with blues and browns predominating. The two inner front toes are connected, but the outer toe is not.

Common name	Binomial	Status
European roller	Coracias garrulus	Accidental
Indochinese roller	Coracias affinis	
Dollarbird	Eurystomus orientalis	

== Asian barbets ==
Order: Piciformes Family: Megalaimidae

The Asian barbets are plump birds, with short necks and large heads. They get their name from the bristles which fringe their heavy bills. Most species are brightly coloured.

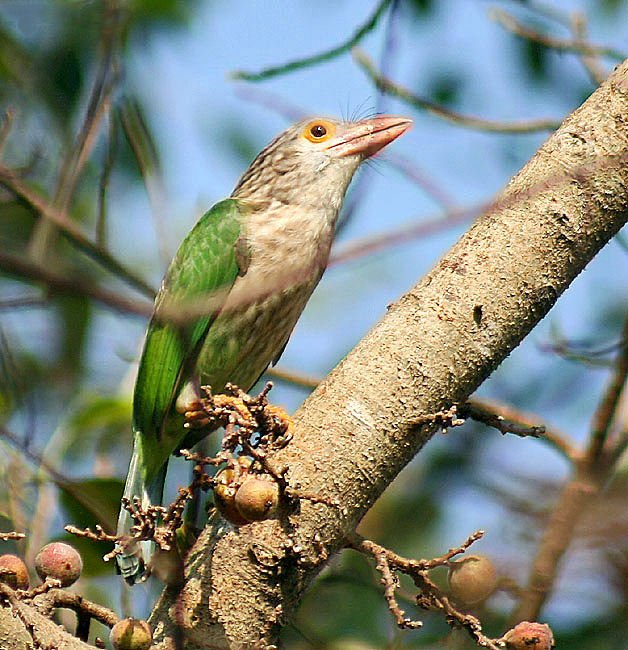
The lineated barbet is a common resident of Thailand.

Common name	Binomial	Status
Sooty barbet	Caloramphus hayii	
Coppersmith barbet	Psilopogon haemacephalus	
Blue-eared barbet	Psilopogon duvaucelii	
Fire-tufted barbet	Psilopogon pyrolophus	Accidental
Great barbet	Psilopogon virens	
Red-crowned barbet	Psilopogon rafflesii	Rare
Red-throated barbet	Psilopogon mystacophanos	
Yellow-crowned barbet	Psilopogon henricii	
Green-eared barbet	Psilopogon faiostrictus	
Lineated barbet	Psilopogon lineatus	
Golden-throated barbet	Psilopogon franklinii	
Necklaced barbet	Psilopogon auricularis	
Gold-whiskered barbet	Psilopogon chrysopogon	
Moustached barbet	Psilopogon incognitus	
Blue-throated barbet	Psilopogon asiaticus	
Black-browed barbet	Psilopogon oorti	
Turquoise-throated barbet	Psilopogon chersonesus	Endemic

== Honeyguides ==
Order: Piciformes Family: Indicatoridae

Honeyguides are among the few birds that feed on wax. They are named for the greater honeyguide which leads traditional honey-hunters to bees' nests and, after the hunters have harvested the honey, feeds on the remaining contents of the hive.

Common name	Binomial	Status
Malaysian honeyguide	Indicator archipelagicus	Rare

== Woodpeckers ==
Order: Piciformes Family: Picidae

Woodpeckers are small to medium-sized birds with chisel-like beaks, short legs, stiff tails, and long tongues used for capturing insects. Some species have feet with two toes pointing forward and two backward, while several species have only three toes. Many woodpeckers have the habit of tapping noisily on tree trunks with their beaks.

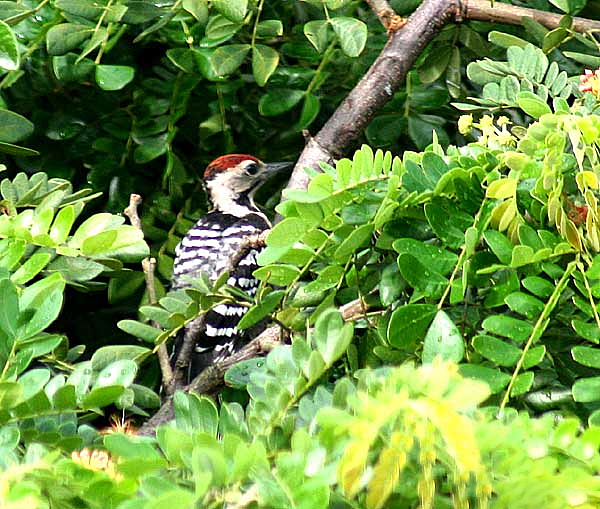
The fulvous-breasted woodpecker is an uncommon resident of Thailand.

Common name	Binomial	Status
Eurasian wryneck	Jynx torquilla	Winter visitor
Speckled piculet	Picumnus innominatus	
Rufous piculet	Sasia abnormis	
White-browed piculet	Sasia ochracea	
Gray-and-buff woodpecker	Hemicircus concretus	
Heart-spotted woodpecker	Hemicircus canente	
Sunda pygmy woodpecker	Yungipicus moluccensis	Accidental
Gray-capped pygmy woodpecker	Yungipicus canicapillus	
Yellow-crowned woodpecker	Leiopicus mahrattensis	Rare
Rufous-bellied woodpecker	Dendrocopos hyperythrus	
Freckle-breasted woodpecker	Dendrocopos analis	
Stripe-breasted woodpecker	Dendrocopos atratus	
Crimson-breasted woodpecker	Dryobates cathpharius	
Maroon woodpecker	Blythipicus rubiginosus	
Bay woodpecker	Blythipicus pyrrhotis	
Orange-backed woodpecker	Reinwardtipicus validus	
Greater flameback	Chrysocolaptes guttacristatus	
Rufous woodpecker	Micropternus brachyurus	
Buff-necked woodpecker	Meiglyptes tukki	
Buff-rumped woodpecker	Meiglyptes tristis	
Black-and-buff woodpecker	Meiglyptes jugularis	
Pale-headed woodpecker	Gecinulus grantia	
Bamboo woodpecker	Gecinulus viridis	
Olive-backed woodpecker	Dinopium rafflesii	Rare
Common flameback	Dinopium javanense	
Lesser yellownape	Picus chlorolophus	
Crimson-winged woodpecker	Picus puniceus	
Streak-throated woodpecker	Picus xanthopygaeus	
Streak-breasted woodpecker	Picus viridanus	
Laced woodpecker	Picus vittatus	
Gray-headed woodpecker	Picus canus	
Black-headed woodpecker	Picus erythropygius	
Banded woodpecker	Chrysophlegma miniaceum	
Greater yellownape	Chrysophlegma flavinucha	
Checker-throated woodpecker	Chrysophlegma mentale	
Great slaty woodpecker	Mulleripicus pulverulentus	
White-bellied woodpecker	Dryocopus javensis	

== Falcons and caracaras ==
Order: Falconiformes Family: Falconidae

Falconidae is a family of diurnal birds of prey. They differ from hawks, eagles, and kites in that they kill with their beaks instead of their talons.

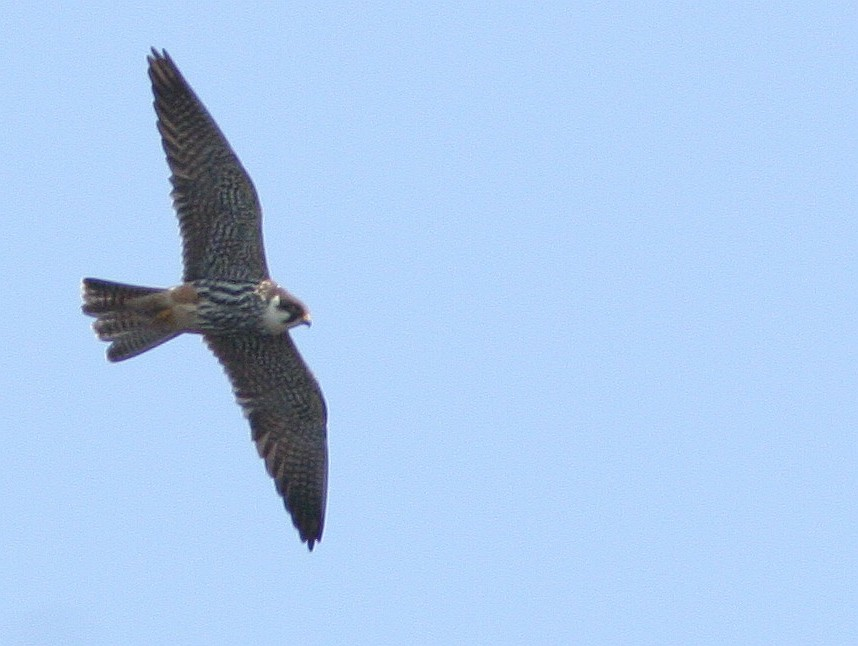
The Eurasian hobby is a rare winter visitor of Thailand.

Common name	Binomial	Status
White-rumped falcon	Polihierax insignis	
Collared falconet	Microhierax caerulescens	
Black-thighed falconet	Microhierax fringillarius	
Eurasian kestrel	Falco tinnunculus	Winter visitor
Amur falcon	Falco amurensis	Very rare passage migrant
Merlin	Falco columbarius	Accidental
Eurasian hobby	Falco subbuteo	Rare winter visitor
Oriental hobby	Falco severus	
Peregrine falcon	Falco peregrinus	Mainly winter visitor

== Old World parrots ==
Order: Psittaciformes Family: Psittaculidae

Characteristic features of parrots include a strong curved bill, an upright stance, strong legs, and clawed zygodactyl feet. Many parrots are vividly coloured, and some are multi-coloured. In size they range from 8 cm (3.1 in) to 1 m (3.3 ft) in length. Old World parrots are found from Africa east across south and southeast Asia and Oceania to Australia and New Zealand.

Common name	Binomial	Status
Blue-rumped parrot	Psittinus cyanurus	Rare, much reduced
Alexandrine parakeet	Psittacula eupatria	Rare, much reduced
Rose-ringed parakeet	Psittacula krameri	Introduced species
Gray-headed parakeet	Psittacula finschii	
Blossom-headed parakeet	Psittacula roseata	
Red-breasted parakeet	Psittacula alexandri	
Vernal hanging-parrot	Loriculus vernalis	
Blue-crowned hanging-parrot	Loriculus galgulus	

== African and green broadbills ==
Order: Passeriformes Family: Calyptomenidae

The broadbills are small, brightly coloured birds, which feed on fruit and also take insects in flycatcher fashion, snapping their broad bills. Their habitat is canopies of wet forests.

Common name	Binomial	Status
Green broadbill	Calyptomena viridis	

== Asian and Grauer's broadbills ==
Order: Passeriformes Family: Eurylaimidae

The broadbills are small, brightly coloured birds, which feed on fruit and also take insects in flycatcher fashion, snapping their broad bills. Their habitat is canopies of wet forests.

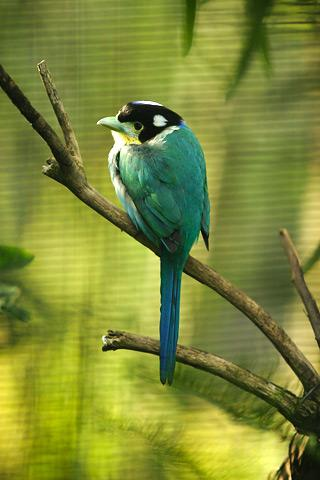
The long-tailed broadbill is a fairly common resident of Thailand.

Common name	Binomial	Status
Long-tailed broadbill	Psarisomus dalhousiae	
Dusky broadbill	Corydon sumatranus	
Silver-breasted broadbill	Serilophus lunatus	
Black-and-red broadbill	Cymbirhynchus macrorhynchos	
Banded broadbill	Eurylaimus javanicus	
Black-and-yellow broadbill	Eurylaimus ochromalus	

== Pittas ==
Order: Passeriformes Family: Pittidae

Pittas are medium-sized stocky passerines with fairly long, strong legs, short tails, and stout bills. Many are brightly coloured. They spend the majority of their time on wet forest floors, eating snails, insects, and similar invertebrate prey.

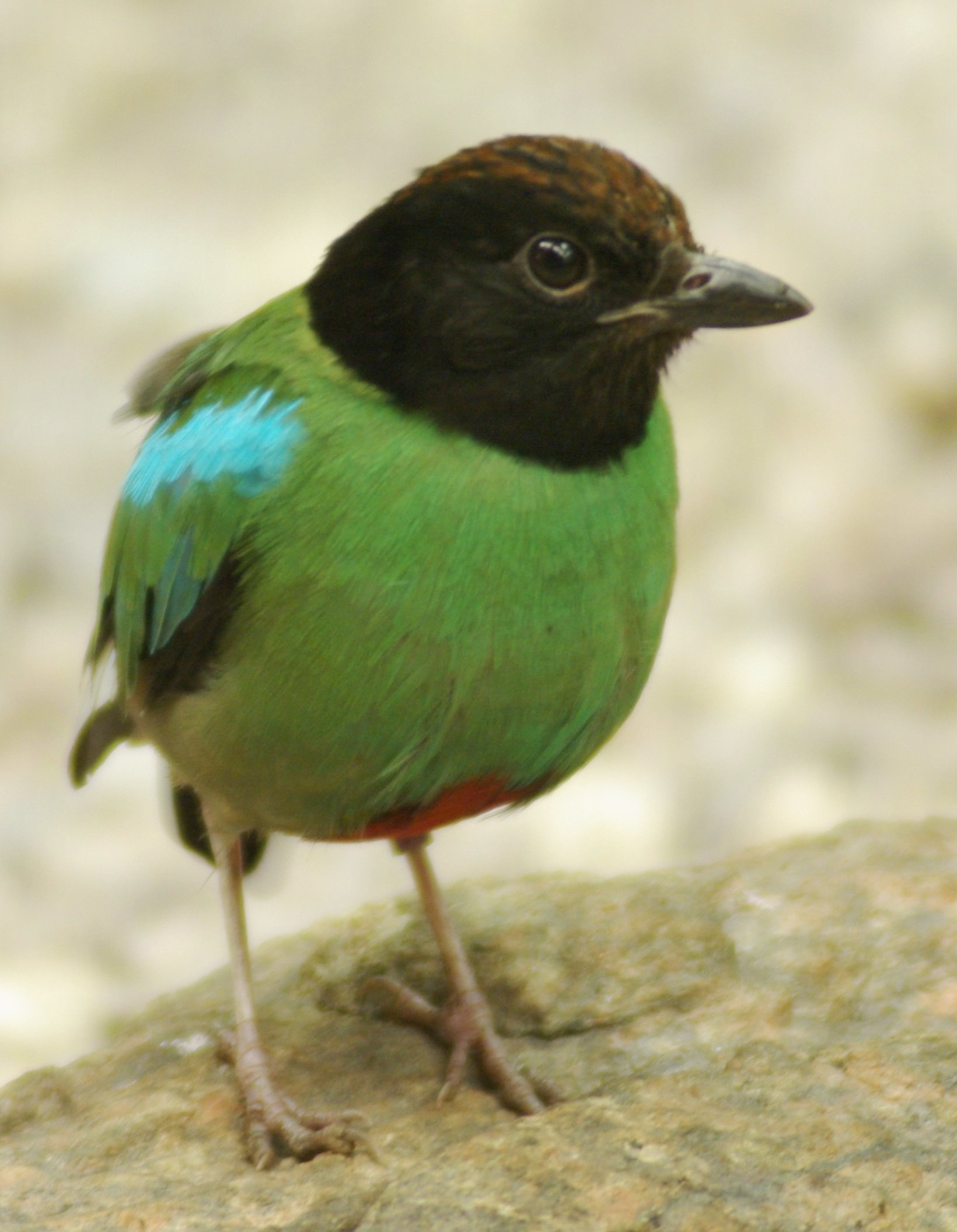
The hooded pitta is an uncommon wet season migrant visitor of Thailand, and some winter in Southern Thailand.

Common name	Binomial	Status
Garnet pitta	Erythropitta granatina	Rare
Eared pitta	Hydrornis phayrei	
Rusty-naped pitta	Hydrornis oatesi	
Blue-naped pitta	Hydrornis nipalensis	
Blue-rumped pitta	Hydrornis soror	
Giant pitta	Hydrornis caeruleus	Rare
Malayan banded-pitta	Hydrornis irena	
Blue pitta	Hydrornis cyaneus	
Bar-bellied pitta	Hydrornis elliotii	Rare
Gurney's pitta	Hydrornis gurneyi	Rediscovered 1986, rare and endangered
Blue-winged pitta	Pitta moluccensis	Summer visitor, passage migrant
Fairy pitta	Pitta nympha	Accidental
Hooded pitta	Pitta sordida	
Mangrove pitta	Pitta megarhyncha	

== Thornbills and allies ==
Order: Passeriformes Family: Acanthizidae

The Acanthizidae are small- to medium-sized birds with short rounded wings, slender bills, long legs, and a short tail. The golden-bellied gerygone is the only member of the family found in mainland Asia.

Common name	Binomial	Status
Golden-bellied gerygone	Gerygone sulphurea	

== Cuckooshrikes ==
Order: Passeriformes Family: Campephagidae

The cuckooshrikes are small to medium-sized passerine birds. They are predominantly greyish with white and black, although some minivet species are brightly coloured.

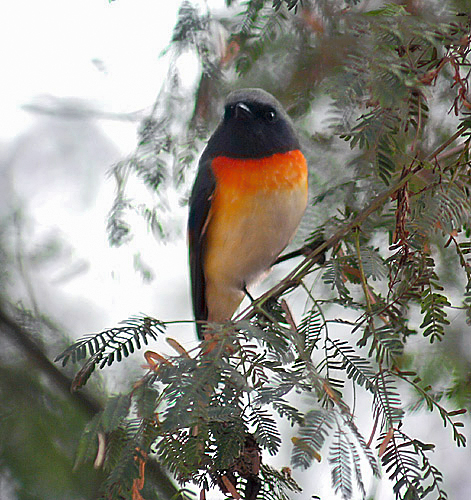
The small minivet is a common resident of Thailand.

Common name	Binomial	Status
Fiery minivet	Pericrocotus igneus	
Small minivet	Pericrocotus cinnamomeus	
Grey-chinned minivet	Pericrocotus solaris	
Short-billed minivet	Pericrocotus brevirostris	
Long-tailed minivet	Pericrocotus ethologus	
Scarlet minivet	Pericrocotus speciosus	
Ashy minivet	Pericrocotus divaricatus	Winter visitor
Brown-rumped minivet	Pericrocotus cantonensis	
Rosy minivet	Pericrocotus roseus	Winter visitor
Large cuckooshrike	Coracina macei	
Bar-bellied cuckooshrike	Coracina striata	Rare, much reduced
Javan cuckooshrike	Coracina javensis	Accidental
Pied triller	Lalage nigra	
Black-winged cuckooshrike	Lalage melaschistos	Resident and winter visitor
Lesser cuckooshrike	Lalage fimbriata	
Indochinese cuckooshrike	Coracina polioptera	

== Vireos, shrike-babblers, and erpornis ==
Order: Passeriformes Family: Vireonidae

Most of the members of this family are found in the New World. However, the shrike-babblers and erpornis, which only slightly resemble the "true" vireos and greenlets, are found in South East Asia.

Common name	Binomial	Status
White-browed shrike-babbler	Pteruthius aeralatus	
Black-eared shrike-babbler	Pteruthius melanotis	
Clicking shrike-babbler	Pteruthius intermedius	
White-bellied erpornis	Erpornis zantholeuca	

== Whistlers and allies ==
Order: Passeriformes Family: Pachycephalidae

The family Pachycephalidae includes the whistlers, shrikethrushes, and some of the pitohuis.

Common name	Binomial	Status
Mangrove whistler	Pachycephala cinerea	

== Old World orioles ==
Order: Passeriformes Family: Oriolidae

The Old World orioles are colourful passerine birds which are not closely related to the New World orioles.

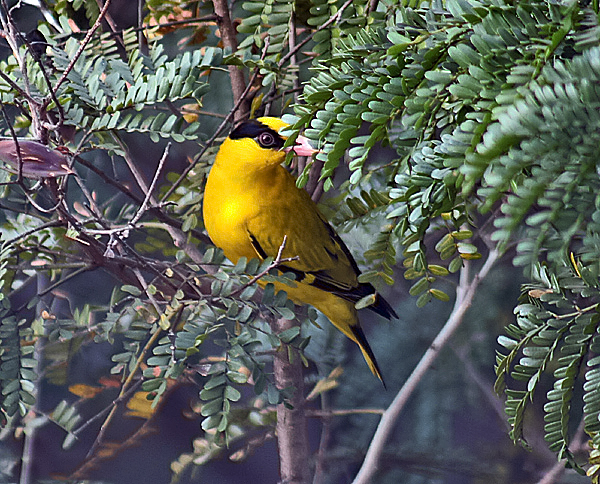
The black-naped oriole is a common winter visitor of Thailand.

Common name	Binomial	Status
Dark-throated oriole	Oriolus xanthonotus	
Indian golden oriole	Oriolus kundoo	Accidental
Black-naped oriole	Oriolus chinensis	Winter visitor
Slender-billed oriole	Oriolus tenuirostris	Winter visitor
Black-hooded oriole	Oriolus xanthornus	
Black-and-crimson oriole	Oriolus cruentus	Accidental
Maroon oriole	Oriolus traillii	
Silver oriole	Oriolus mellianus	Rare winter visitor, endangered

== Woodswallows, bellmagpies, and allies ==
Order: Passeriformes Family: Artamidae

The woodswallows are soft-plumaged, somber-coloured passerine birds. They are smooth, agile flyers with moderately large, semi-triangular wings.

Common name	Binomial	Status
Ashy woodswallow	Artamus fuscus	
White-breasted woodswallow	Artamus leucorynchus	Accidental

== Vangas, helmetshrikes, and allies ==
Order: Passeriformes Family: Vangidae

The family Vangidae is highly variable, though most members of it resemble true shrikes to some degree.

Common name	Binomial	Status
Large woodshrike	Tephrodornis virgatus	
Common woodshrike	Tephrodornis pondicerianus	
Bar-winged flycatcher-shrike	Hemipus picatus	
Black-winged flycatcher-shrike	Hemipus hirundinaceus	
Rufous-winged philentoma	Philentoma pyrhoptera	
Maroon-breasted philentoma	Philentoma velata	

== Ioras ==
Order: Passeriformes Family: Aegithinidae

The ioras are bulbul-like birds of open forest or thorn scrub, but whereas that group tends to be drab in colouration, ioras are sexually dimorphic, with the males being brightly plumaged in yellows and greens.

Common name	Binomial	Status
Common iora	Aegithina tiphia	
Green iora	Aegithina viridissima	
Great iora	Aegithina lafresnayei	

== Fantails ==
Order: Passeriformes Family: Rhipiduridae

The fantails are small insectivorous birds with longish, frequently fanned, tails.

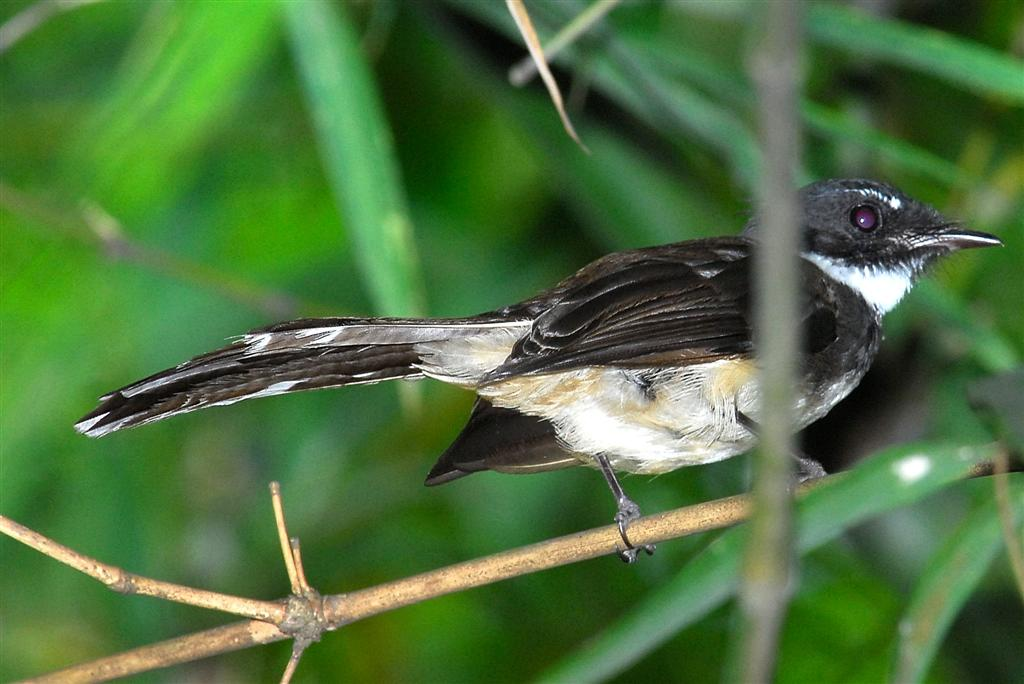
The Malaysian pied-fantail is a very common resident of Thailand.

Common name	Binomial	Status
Spotted fantail	Rhipidura perlata	Rare
Malaysian pied-fantail	Rhipidura javanica	
White-throated fantail	Rhipidura albicollis	
White-browed fantail	Rhipidura aureola	

== Drongos ==
Order: Passeriformes Family: Dicruridae

The drongos are mostly black or dark grey in colour, sometimes with metallic tints. They have long forked tails, and some Asian species have elaborate tail decorations. They have short legs and sit very upright when perched, like a shrike. They flycatch or take prey from the ground.

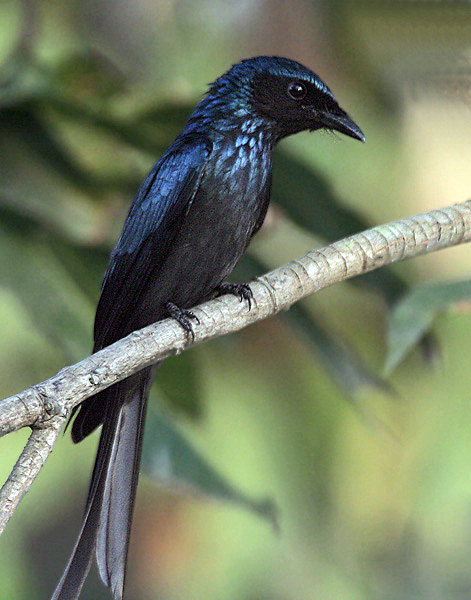
The bronzed drongo is a common resident of Thailand.

Common name	Binomial	Status
Black drongo	Dicrurus macrocercus	Resident and winter visitor
Ashy drongo	Dicrurus leucophaeus	Resident and winter visitor
Crow-billed drongo	Dicrurus annectens	Winter visitor and passage migrant
Bronzed drongo	Dicrurus aeneus	
Lesser racket-tailed drongo	Dicrurus remifer	
Hair-crested drongo	Dicrurus hottentottus	Resident and winter visitor
Greater racket-tailed drongo	Dicrurus paradiseus	

== Monarch flycatchers ==
Order: Passeriformes Family: Monarchidae

The monarch flycatchers are small to medium-sized insectivorous passerines which hunt by gleaning, hovering or flycatching.

Common name	Binomial	Status
Black-naped monarch	Hypothymis azurea	
Japanese paradise-flycatcher	Terpsiphone atrocaudata	Rare winter visitor, passage migrant
Amur paradise-flycatcher	Terpsiphone incei	
Blyth's paradise-flycatcher	Terpsiphone affinis	Resident and winter visitor

== Crested shrikejay ==
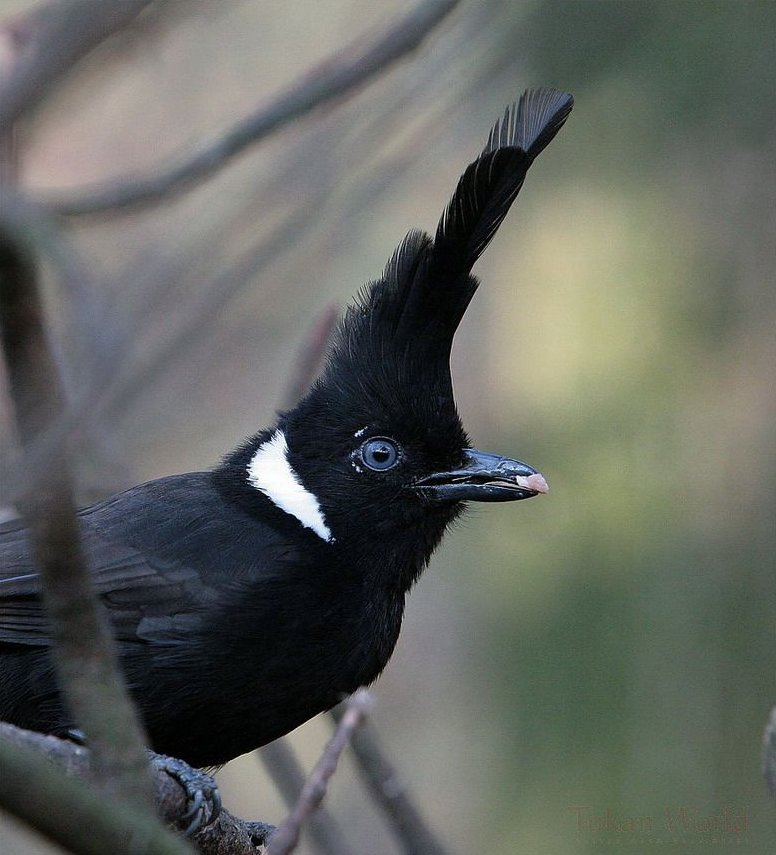
The crested shrikejay is an uncommon resident of Thailand.

Order: Passeriformes Family: Platylophidae

Until 2018 this species was included in family Corvidae, but genetic and morphological evidence place it in its own family.

Common name	Binomial	Status
Crested shrikejay	Platylophus galericulatus	

== Shrikes ==
Order: Passeriformes Family: Laniidae

Shrikes are passerine birds known for the habit of some species of catching other birds and small animals and impaling the uneaten portions of their bodies on thorns. A shrike's beak is hooked, like that of a typical bird of prey.

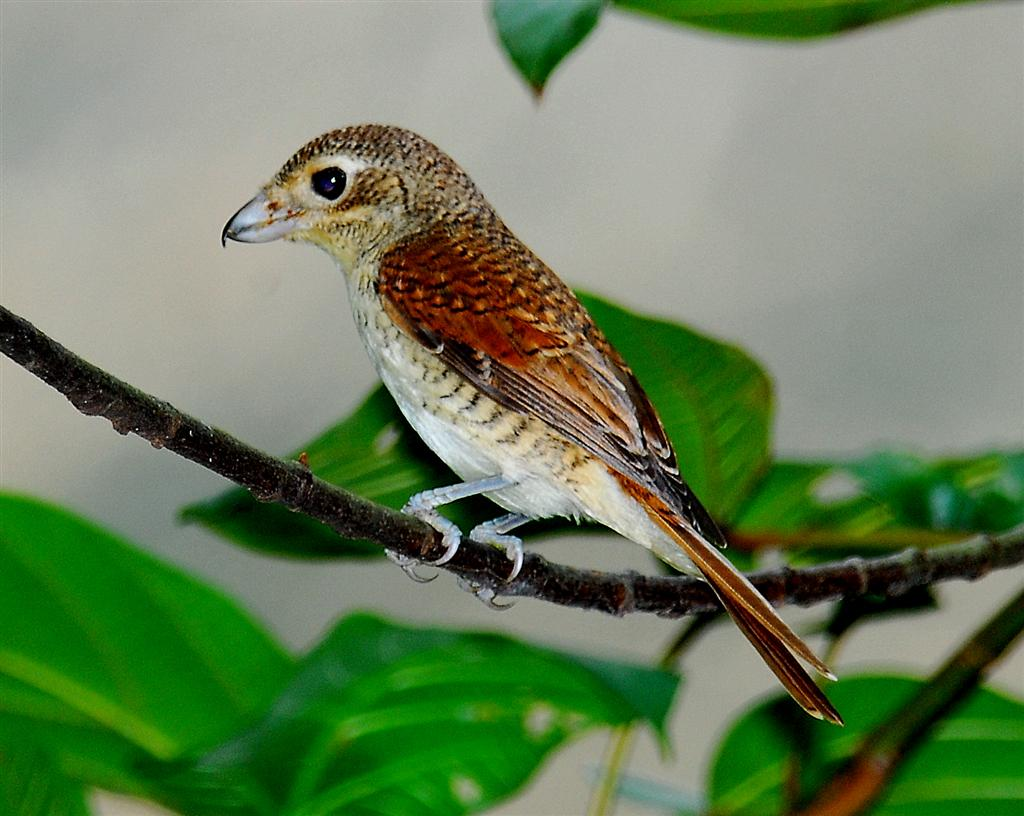
The tiger shrike is a passage migrant of Thailand.

Common name	Binomial	Status
Tiger shrike	Lanius tigrinus	Fairly common passage migrant
Red-backed shrike	Lanius collurio	Accidental
Brown shrike	Lanius cristatus	Winter visitor
Burmese shrike	Lanius collurioides	Winter visitor
Bay-backed shrike	Lanius vittatus	Accidental
Long-tailed shrike	Lanius schach	Passage migrant
Gray-backed shrike	Lanius tephronotus	Winter visitor

== Crows, jays, and magpies ==
Order: Passeriformes Family: Corvidae

The family Corvidae includes crows, ravens, jays, choughs, magpies, treepies, nutcrackers, and ground jays. Corvids are above average in size among the Passeriformes, and some of the larger species show high levels of intelligence.

Common name	Binomial	Status
Black magpie	Platysmurus leucopterus	
Eurasian jay	Garrulus glandarius	
Red-billed blue-magpie	Urocissa erythrorhyncha	
Common green-magpie	Cissa chinensis	
Indochinese green-magpie	Cissa hypoleuca	
Rufous treepie	Dendrocitta vagabunda	
Gray treepie	Dendrocitta formosae	
Racket-tailed treepie	Crypsirina temia	
Ratchet-tailed treepie	Temnurus temnurus	Accidental
Oriental magpie	Pica serica	Accidental
Eurasian magpie	Pica pica	Accidental
House crow	Corvus splendens	Introduced species
Rook	Corvus frugilegus	Accidental
Large-billed crow	Corvus macrorhynchos	

== Rail-babbler ==
Order: Passeriformes Family: Eupetidae

The Malaysian rail-babbler is a rail-like passerine bird which inhabits the floor of primary forest in the Malay Peninsula and Sumatra. It is the only member of its family. The nominate subspecies E. m. macrocerus is found in Thailand.

Common name	Binomial	Status
Malaysian rail-babbler	Eupetes macrocerus	

== Fairy flycatchers ==
Order: Passeriformes Family: Stenostiridae

Most of the species of this small family are found in Africa, though a few inhabit tropical Asia. They are not closely related to other birds called "flycatchers".

Common name	Binomial	Status
Yellow-bellied fairy-fantail	Chelidorhynx hypoxanthus	
Gray-headed canary-flycatcher	Culicicapa ceylonensis	

== Tits, chickadees, and titmice ==
Order: Passeriformes Family: Paridae

The Paridae are mainly small stocky woodland species with short stout bills. Some have crests. They are adaptable birds, with a mixed diet including seeds and insects.

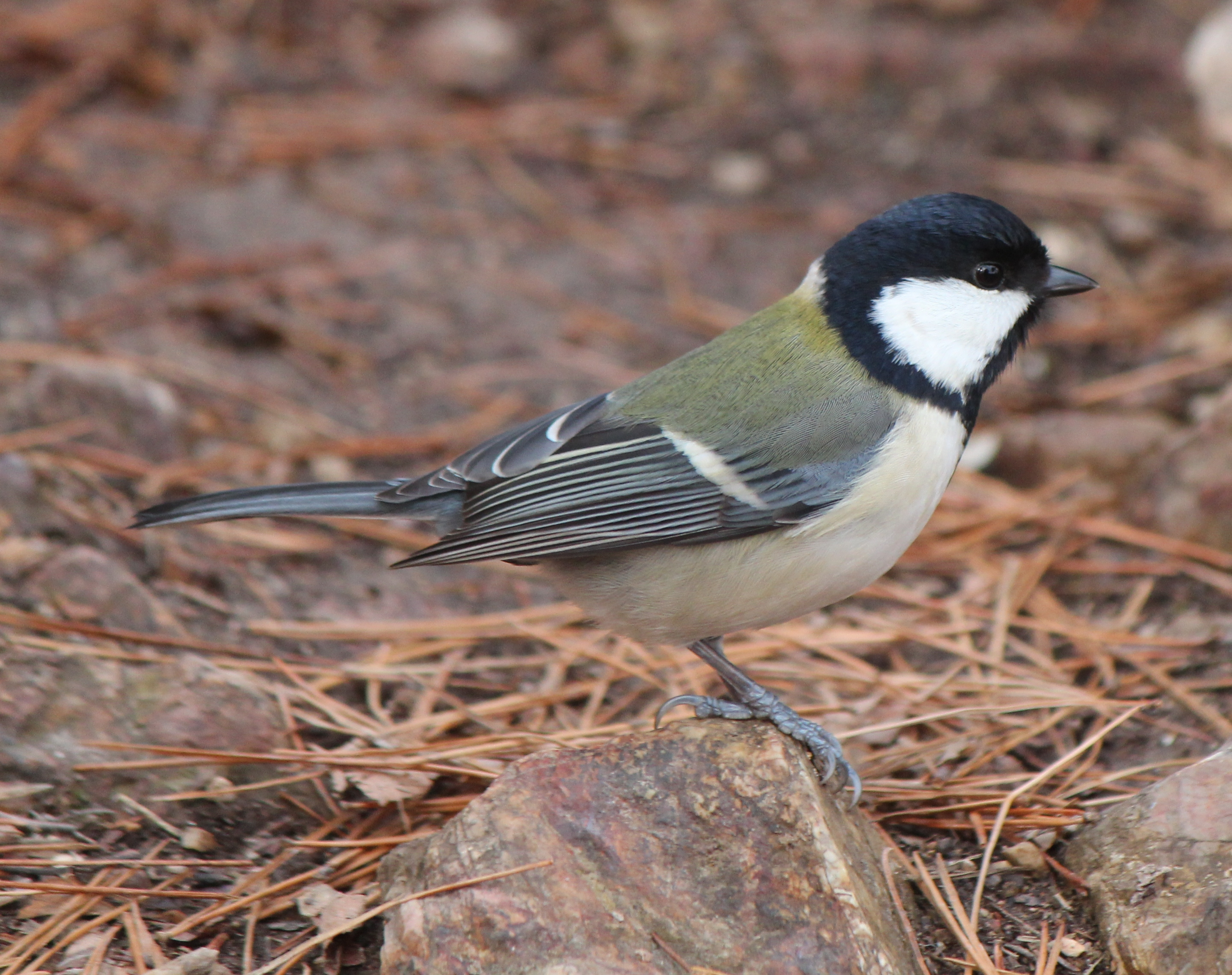
Japanese tit

Common name	Binomial	Status
Fire-capped tit	Cephalopyrus flammiceps	
Yellow-browed tit	Sylviparus modestus	
Sultan tit	Melanochlora sultanea	
Cinereous tit	Parus cinereous	
Japanese tit	Parus minor	
Yellow-cheeked tit	Machlolophus spilonotus	

== Larks ==
Order: Passeriformes Family: Alaudidae

Larks are small terrestrial birds with often extravagant songs and display flights. Most larks are fairly dull in appearance. Their food is insects and seeds.

Common name	Binomial	Status
Horsfield's bushlark	Mirafra javanica	
Indochinese bushlark	Mirafra erythrocephala	
Greater short-toed lark	Calandrella brachydactyla	
Mongolian short-toed lark	Calandrella dukhunensis	Accidental
Oriental skylark	Alauda gulgula	

== Cisticolas and allies ==
Order: Passeriformes Family: Cisticolidae

The Cisticolidae are warblers found mainly in warmer southern regions of the Old World. They are generally very small birds of drab brown or grey appearance found in open country such as grassland or scrub.

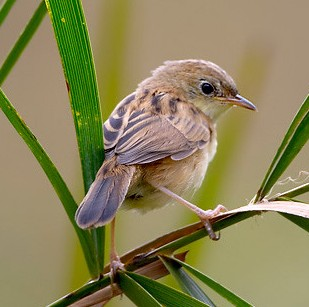
The golden-headed cisticola is a common resident of the grasslands of Thailand.

Common name	Binomial	Status
Common tailorbird	Orthotomus sutorius	
Dark-necked tailorbird	Orthotomus atrogularis	
Ashy tailorbird	Orthotomus ruficeps	
Rufous-tailed tailorbird	Orthotomus sericeus	
Burmese prinia	Prinia cooki	
Brown prinia	Prinia polychroa	
Hill prinia	Prinia superciliaris	
Rufescent prinia	Prinia rufescens	
Gray-breasted prinia	Prinia hodgsonii	
Yellow-bellied prinia	Prinia flaviventris	
Plain prinia	Prinia inornata	
Zitting cisticola	Cisticola juncidis	
Golden-headed cisticola	Cisticola exilis	

== Reed warblers and allies ==
Order: Passeriformes Family: Acrocephalidae

The members of this family are usually rather large for "warblers". Most are rather plain olivaceous brown above with much yellow to beige below. They are usually found in open woodland, reedbeds, or tall grass. The family occurs mostly in southern to western Eurasia and surroundings, but it also ranges far into the Pacific, with some species in Africa.

Common name	Binomial	Status
Thick-billed warbler	Arundinax aedon	Winter visitor
Booted warbler	Iduna caligata	Accidental
Black-browed reed warbler	Acrocephalus bistrigiceps	Winter visitor
Paddyfield warbler	Acrocephalus agricola	Rare winter visitor
Blunt-winged warbler	Acrocephalus concinens	Winter visitor
Manchurian reed warbler	Acrocephalus tangorum	Winter visitor
Blyth's reed warbler	Acrocephalus dumetorum	Passage migrant
Large-billed reed warbler	Acrocephalus orinus	Rare, rediscovered 2006
Oriental reed warbler	Acrocephalus orientalis	Winter visitor
Clamorous reed warbler	Acrocephalus stentoreus	Very rare winter visitor

== Grassbirds and allies ==
Order: Passeriformes Family: Locustellidae

Locustellidae are a family of small insectivorous songbirds found mainly in Eurasia, Africa, and the Australian region. They are smallish birds with tails that are usually long and pointed, and tend to be drab brownish or buffy all over.

Common name	Binomial	Status
Marsh grassbird	Helopsaltes pryeri	Accidental
Pallas's grasshopper warbler	Helopsaltes certhiola	Winter visitor
Lanceolated warbler	Locustella lanceolata	Winter visitor
Brown bush warbler	Locustella luteoventris	Rare winter visitor
Chinese bush warbler	Locustella tacsanowskia	Very rare winter visitor
Baikal bush warbler	Locustella davidi	Winter visitor
Spotted bush warbler	Locustella thoracica	Accidental
Russet bush warbler	Locustella mandelli	
Dalat bush warbler	Locustella idonea	
Striated grassbird	Megalurus palustris	

== Cupwings ==
Order: Passeriformes Family: Pnoepygidae

The members of this small family are found in mountainous parts of South and South East Asia.

Common name	Binomial	Status
Pygmy cupwing	Pnoepyga pusilla	

== Swallows ==
Order: Passeriformes Family: Hirundinidae

The family Hirundinidae is adapted to aerial feeding. They have a slender streamlined body, long pointed wings, and a short bill with a wide gape. The feet are adapted to perching rather than walking, and the front toes are partially joined at the base.

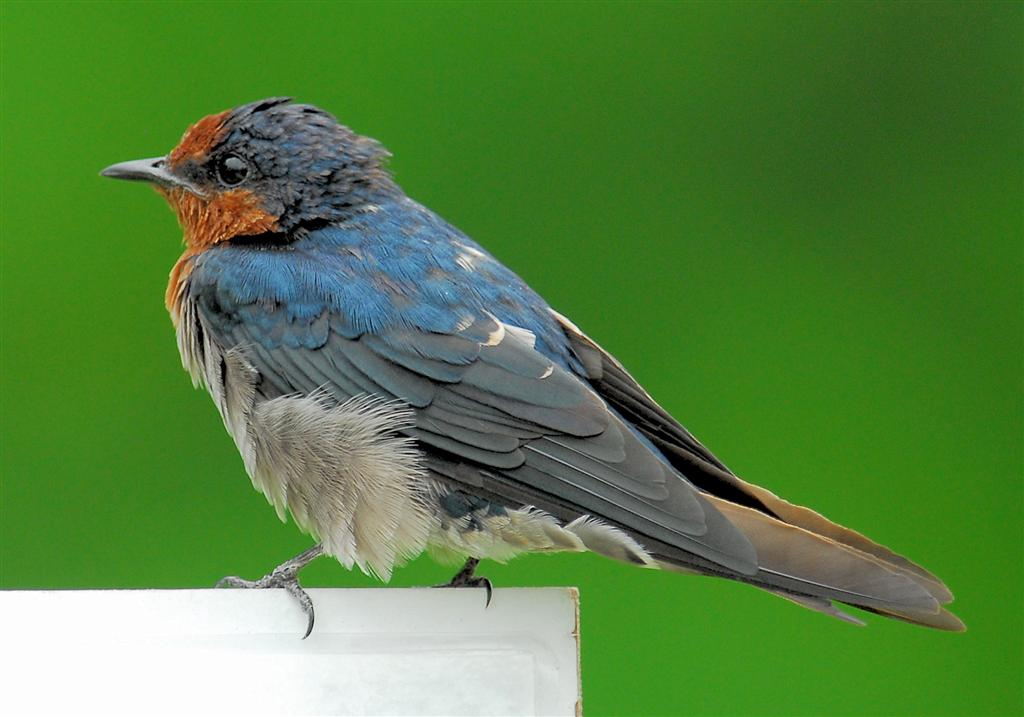
The Pacific swallow is a common resident of Thailand.

Common name	Binomial	Status
White-eyed river martin	Pseudochelidon sirintarae	Endemic, critically endangered
Gray-throated martin	Riparia chinensis	
Bank swallow	Riparia riparia	Winter visitor
Pale sand martin	Riparia diluta	Accidental
Dusky crag-martin	Ptyonoprogne concolor	
Barn swallow	Hirundo rustica	Winter visitor
Wire-tailed swallow	Hirundo smithii	
Pacific swallow	Hirundo tahitica	
Red-rumped swallow	Cecropis daurica	Winter visitor, local breeder
Striated swallow	Cecropis striolata	
Rufous-bellied swallow	Cecropis badia	
Common house-martin	Delichon urbicum	Rare winter visitor
Asian house-martin	Delichon dasypus	Winter visitor
Nepal house-martin	Delichon nipalensis	One record

== Bulbuls ==
Order: Passeriformes Family: Pycnonotidae

Bulbuls are medium-sized songbirds. Some are colourful with yellow, red, or orange vents, cheeks, throats, or supercilia, but most are drab, with uniform olive-brown to black plumage. Some species have distinct crests.

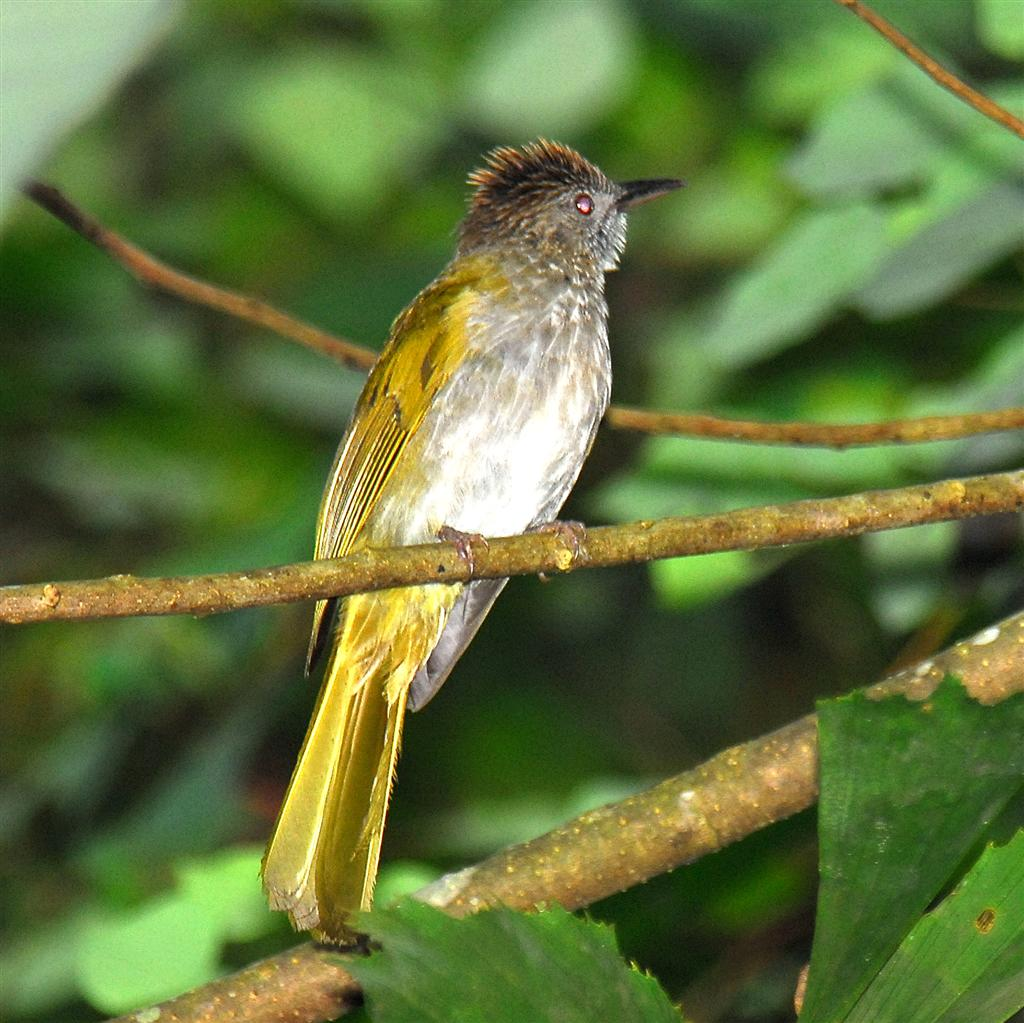
The mountain bulbul is a common resident in the highlands of Thailand.

Common name	Binomial	Status
Black-and-white bulbul	Brachypodius melanoleucos	Rare
Puff-backed bulbul	Brachypodius eutilotus	
Black-headed bulbul	Brachypodius melanocephalos	
Spectacled bulbul	Rubigula erythropthalmos	
Gray-bellied bulbul	Rubigula cyaniventris	
Scaly-breasted bulbul	Rubigula squamata	
Black-crested bulbul	Rubigula flaviventris	
Crested finchbill	Spizixos canifrons	
Straw-headed bulbul	Pycnonotus zeylanicus	Rare, Critically endangered
Striated bulbul	Pycnonotus striatus	
Red-vented bulbul	Pycnonotus cafer	Accidental
Red-whiskered bulbul	Pycnonotus jocosus	
Brown-breasted bulbul	Pycnonotus xanthorrhous	
Light-vented bulbul	Pycnonotus sinensis	
Sooty-headed bulbul	Pycnonotus aurigaster	
Stripe-throated bulbul	Pycnonotus finlaysoni	
Flavescent bulbul	Pycnonotus flavescens	
Yellow-vented bulbul	Pycnonotus goiavier	
Olive-winged bulbul	Pycnonotus plumosus	
Ayeyarwady bulbul	Pycnonotus blanfordi	
Streak-eared bulbul	Pycnonotus conradi	
Cream-vented bulbul	Pycnonotus simplex	
Red-eyed bulbul	Pycnonotus brunneus	
Hairy-backed bulbul	Tricholestes criniger	
Finsch's bulbul	Alophoixus finschii	
Yellow-bellied bulbul	Alophoixus phaeocephalus	
Gray-cheeked bulbul	Alophoixus tephrogenys	
White-throated bulbul	Alophoixus flaveolus	
Ochraceous bulbul	Alophoixus ochraceus	
Puff-throated bulbul	Alophoixus pallidus	
Buff-vented bulbul	Iole crypta	
Gray-eyed bulbul	Iole propinqua	
Olive bulbul	Iole virescens	
Black bulbul	Hypsipetes leucocephalus	Resident and winter visitor
White-headed bulbul	Hypsipetes thompsoni	
Ashy bulbul	Hemixos flavala	
Cinereous bulbul	Hemixos cinereus	
Chestnut bulbul	Hemixos castanonotus	Accidental
Mountain bulbul	Ixos mcclellandii	
Streaked bulbul	Ixos malaccensis	

== Leaf warblers ==
Order: Passeriformes Family: Phylloscopidae

Leaf warblers are a family of small insectivorous birds found mostly in Eurasia and ranging into Wallacea and Africa. The species are of various sizes, often green-plumaged above and yellow below, or more subdued with greyish-green to greyish-brown colours.

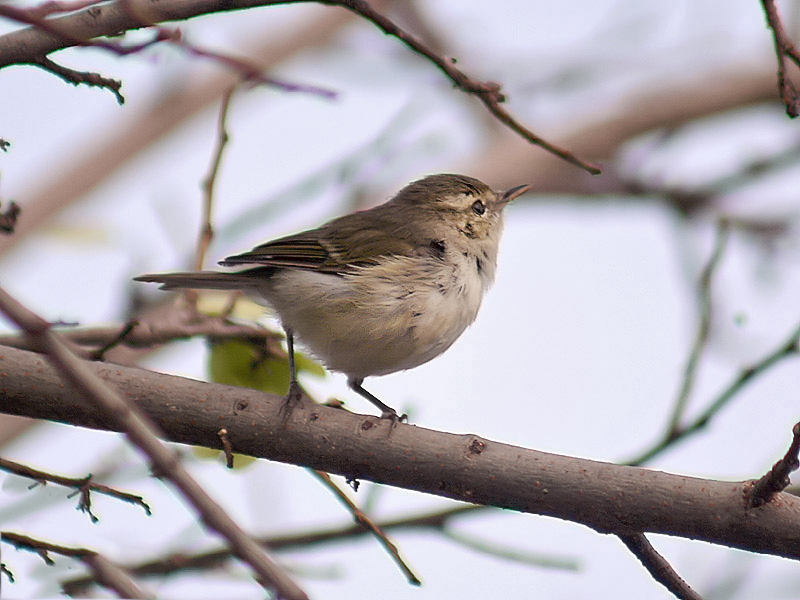
The greenish warbler is a fairly common winter visitor of Thailand.

Common name	Binomial	Status
Ashy-throated warbler	Phylloscopus maculipennis	Winter visitor
Buff-barred warbler	Phylloscopus pulcher	Winter visitor
Yellow-browed warbler	Phylloscopus inornatus	Winter visitor
Hume's warbler	Phylloscopus humei	Winter visitor
Chinese leaf warbler	Phylloscopus yunnanensis	Winter visitor
Pallas's leaf warbler	Phylloscopus proregulus	Winter visitor
Sichuan leaf warbler	Phylloscopus forresti	
Radde's warbler	Phylloscopus schwarzi	Winter visitor
Yellow-streaked warbler	Phylloscopus armandii	Winter visitor
Tickell's leaf warbler	Phylloscopus affinis	Winter visitor
Dusky warbler	Phylloscopus fuscatus	Winter visitor
Buff-throated warbler	Phylloscopus subaffinis	Winter visitor
Common chiffchaff	Phylloscopus collybita	Accidental
Eastern crowned warbler	Phylloscopus coronatus	Winter and passage visitor
White-spectacled warbler	Phylloscopus intermedius	Accidental
Gray-cheeked warbler	Phylloscopus poliogenys	
Green-crowned warbler	Phylloscopus burkii	
Gray-crowned warbler	Phylloscopus tephrocephalus	Rare winter visitor
Whistler's warbler	Phylloscopus whistleri	
Bianchi's warbler	Phylloscopus valentini	Winter visitor
Martens's warbler	Phylloscopus omeiensis	Winter visitor
Alström's warbler	Phylloscopus soror	Winter visitor
Green warbler	Phylloscopus nitidus	Accidental
Greenish warbler	Phylloscopus trochiloides	Winter visitor
Two-barred warbler	Phylloscopus plumbeitarsus	Winter visitor
Large-billed leaf warbler	Phylloscopus magnirostris	Winter visitor
Pale-legged leaf warbler	Phylloscopus tenellipes	Winter visitor
Sakhalin leaf warbler	Phylloscopus borealoides	
Japanese leaf warbler	Phylloscopus xanthodryas	Accidental
Arctic warbler	Phylloscopus borealis	Winter and passage visitor
Kamchatka leaf warbler	Phylloscopus examinandus	
Chestnut-crowned warbler	Phylloscopus castaniceps	
Yellow-vented warbler	Phylloscopus cantator	Rare winter visitor
Sulphur-breasted warbler	Phylloscopus ricketti	Winter visitor
Blyth's leaf warbler	Phylloscopus reguloides	Winter visitor
Claudia's leaf warbler	Phylloscopus claudiae	Winter visitor
Hartert's leaf warbler	Phylloscopus goodsoni	Accidental
Davison's leaf warbler	Phylloscopus intensior	
Kloss's leaf warbler	Phylloscopus ogilviegranti	
Mountain leaf warbler	Phylloscopus trivirgatus	Accidental

== Bush warblers and allies ==
Order: Passeriformes Family: Scotocercidae

The members of this family are found throughout Africa, Asia, and Polynesia. Their taxonomy is in flux, and some authorities place some genera in other families.

Common name	Binomial	Status
Pale-footed bush warbler	Urosphena pallidipes	
Asian stubtail	Urosphena squameiceps	Winter visitor
Gray-bellied tesia	Tesia cyaniventer	Very rare
Slaty-bellied tesia	Tesia olivea	
Chestnut-crowned bush warbler	Cettia major	Very rare winter visitor
Chestnut-headed tesia	Cettia castaneocoronata	
Yellow-bellied warbler	Abroscopus superciliaris	
Rufous-faced warbler	Abroscopus albogularis	Rare
Mountain tailorbird	Phyllergetes cuculatus	
Manchurian bush warbler	Horornis canturians	Rare winter visitor
Aberrant bush warbler	Horornis flavolivacea	

== Long-tailed tits ==
Order: Passeriformes Family: Aegithalidae

Long-tailed tits are a group of small passerine birds with medium to long tails. They make woven bag nests in trees. Most eat a mixed diet which includes insects.

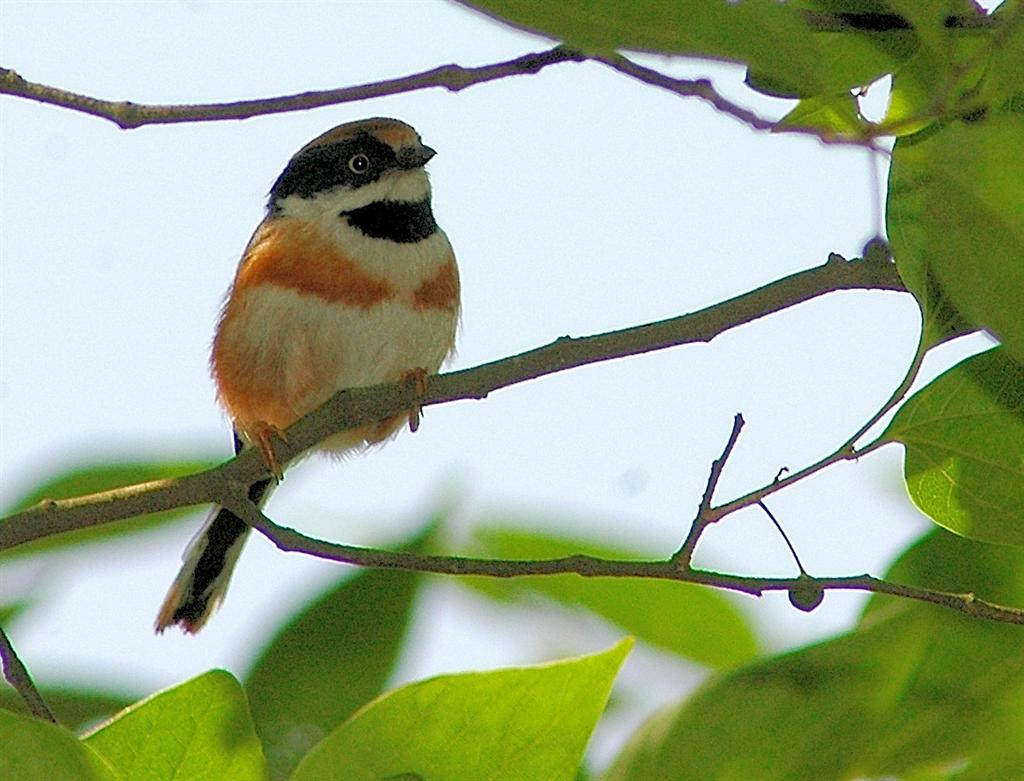
The black-throated tit is locally common in the northern mountains of Thailand.

Common name	Binomial	Status
Black-throated tit	Aegithalos concinnus	

== Sylviid warblers, parrotbills, and allies ==
Order: Passeriformes Family: Sylviidae

The family Sylviidae is a group of small insectivorous passerine birds. They mainly occur as breeding species, as another common name (Old World warblers) implies, in Europe, Asia and, to a lesser extent, Africa. Most are of generally undistinguished appearance, but many have distinctive songs.

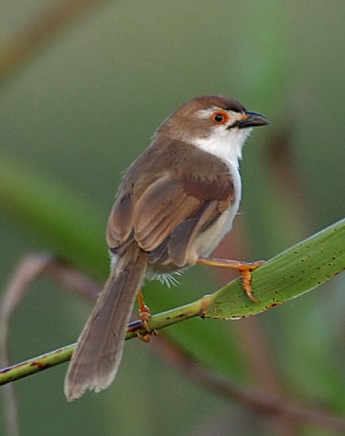
The yellow-eyed babbler is a very common resident of Thailand.

Common name	Binomial	Status
Lesser whitethroat	Curruca curruca	Rare winter visitor
Yellow-eyed babbler	Chrysomma sinense	
Spot-breasted parrotbill	Paradoxornis guttaticollis	
Gray-headed parrotbill	Psittiparus gularis	
Rufous-headed parrotbill	Psittiparus bakeri	Accidental
Short-tailed parrotbill	Neosuthora davidiana	Rare
Black-throated parrotbill	Suthola nipalensis	
Pale-billed parrotbill	Chleuasicus atrosuperciliaris	Rare

== White-eyes, yuhinas, and allies ==
Order: Passeriformes Family: Zosteropidae

The white-eyes are small birds of rather drab appearance, the plumage above being typically greenish-olive, but some species have a white or bright yellow throat, breast, or lower parts, and several have buff flanks. As the name suggests, many species have a white ring around each eye.

Common name	Binomial	Status
Striated yuhina	Staphida castaniceps	
Indochinese yuhina	Staphida torqueola	
Whiskered yuhina	Yuhina flavicollis	
Burmese yuhina	Yuhina humilis	
Chestnut-flanked white-eye	Zosterops erythropleurus	Winter visitor
Swinhoe's white-eye	Zosterops simplex	
Indian white-eye	Zosterops palpebrosus	
Hume's white-eye	Zosterops auriventer	

== Tree-babblers, scimitar-babblers, and allies ==
Order: Passeriformes Family: Timaliidae

The members of this family are somewhat diverse in size and colouration, but are characterised by soft fluffy plumage.

Common name	Binomial	Status
Chestnut-capped babbler	Timalia pileata	
Pin-striped tit-babbler	Mixornis gularis	
Fluffy-backed tit-babbler	Macronus ptilosus	Rare, much reduced
Golden babbler	Cyanoderma chrysaeum	
Chestnut-winged babbler	Cyanoderma erythropterum	
Rufous-fronted babbler	Cyanoderma rufifrons	
Buff-chested babbler	Cyanoderma ambiguum	
Naga wren-babbler	Spelaeornis chocolatinus	Accidental
Gray-bellied wren-babbler	Spelaeornis reptatus	
Black laughingthrush	Melanocichla lugubris	Accidental
Coral-billed scimitar-babbler	Pomatorhinus ferruginosus	Rare
Red-billed scimitar-babbler	Pomatorhinus ochraceiceps	
White-browed scimitar-babbler	Pomatorhinus schisticeps	
Sunda scimitar-babbler	Pomatorhinus bornensis	Accidental
Large scimitar-babbler	Erythrogenys hypoleucos	
Red-eyed scimitar-babbler	Erythrogenys imberbis	
Black-throated babbler	Stachyris nigricollis	
Chestnut-rumped babbler	Stachyris maculata	
Gray-throated babbler	Stachyris nigriceps	
Gray-headed babbler	Stachyris poliocephala	
White-necked babbler	Stachyris leucotis	Rare
Spot-necked babbler	Stachyris strialata	

== Ground babblers and allies ==
Order: Passeriformes Family: Pellorneidae

These small to medium-sized songbirds have soft fluffy plumage but are otherwise rather diverse. Members of the genus Illadopsis are found in forests, but some other genera are birds of scrublands.

Common name	Binomial	Status
Chinese grassbird	Graminicola striatus	Extirpated
Large wren-babbler	Turdinus macrodactylus	
Sooty-capped babbler	Malacopteron affine	Rare
Scaly-crowned babbler	Malacopteron cinereum	
Rufous-crowned babbler	Malacopteron magnum	
Moustached babbler	Malacopteron magnirostre	
Collared babbler	Gampsorhynchus torquatus	
Rufous-winged fulvetta	Schoeniparus castaneceps	
Rufous-throated fulvetta	Schoeniparus rufogularis	Rare
Rusty-capped fulvetta	Schoeniparus dubius	Accidental
Puff-throated babbler	Pellorneum ruficeps	
Black-capped babbler	Pellorneum capistratum	
Short-tailed babbler	Pellorneum malaccense	
Spot-throated babbler	Pellorneum albiventre	
Buff-breasted babbler	Pellorneum tickelli	
White-chested babbler	Pellorneum rostratum	
Ferruginous babbler	Pellorneum bicolor	
Striped wren-babbler	Kenopia striata	Rare
Abbott's babbler	Malacocincla abbotti	
Horsfield's babbler	Malacocincla sepiaria	
Streaked wren-babbler	Gypsophila brevicaudata	
Annam limestone babbler	Gypsophila annamensis	Accidental
Rufous limestone babbler	Gypsophila calcicola	Endemic
Variable limestone babbler	Gypsophila crispifrons	
Eyebrowed wren-babbler	Napothera epilepidota	

== Laughingthrushes and allies ==
Order: Passeriformes Family: Leiothrichidae

The members of this family are diverse in size and colouration, though those of genus Turdoides tend to be brown or greyish. The family is found in Africa, India, and southeast Asia.

Common name	Binomial	Status
Brown-cheeked fulvetta	Alcippe poioicephala	
Black-browed fulvetta	Alcippe grotei	
Brown fulvetta	Alcippe brunneicauda	
Yunnan fulvetta	Alcippe fratercula	
Mountain fulvetta	Alcippe peracensis	
Himalayan cutia	Cutia nipalensis	Rare
Red-tailed laughingthrush	Trochalopteron milnei	Rare
Silver-eared laughingthrush	Trochalopteron melanostigma	
Malayan laughingthrush	Trochalopteron peninsulae	
Long-tailed sibia	Heterophasia picaoides	
Black-backed sibia	Heterophasia melanoleuca	
Blue-winged minla	Actinodura cyanouroptera	
Chestnut-tailed minla	Actinodura strigula	
Spectacled barwing	Actinodura ramsayi	
Silver-eared mesia	Leiothrix argentauris	
Rufous-backed sibia	Leioptila annectens	
Scarlet-faced liocichla	Liocichla ripponi	
Spot-breasted laughingthrush	Garrulax merulinus	Very rare
Lesser necklaced laughingthrush	Garrulax monileger	
White-crested laughingthrush	Garrulax leucolophus	
White-necked laughingthrush	Garrulax strepitans	
Cambodian laughingthrush	Garrulax ferrarius	
Chestnut-capped laughingthrush	Pterorhinus mitratus	Rare in far south
Black-throated laughingthrush	Pterorhinus chinensis	
White-browed laughingthrush	Pterorhinus sannio	
Greater necklaced laughingthrush	Pterorhinus pectoralis	

== Wallcreeper ==
Order: Passeriformes Family: Tichodromidae

The wallcreeper is the only member of its family. It inhabits the high mountains of Eurasia from southern Europe to central China.

Common name	Binomial	Status
Wallcreeper	Tichodroma muraria	Accidental

== Nuthatches ==
Order: Passeriformes Family: Sittidae

Nuthatches are small woodland birds. They have the unusual ability to climb down trees head first, unlike other birds which can only go upwards. Nuthatches have big heads, short tails, and powerful bills and feet.

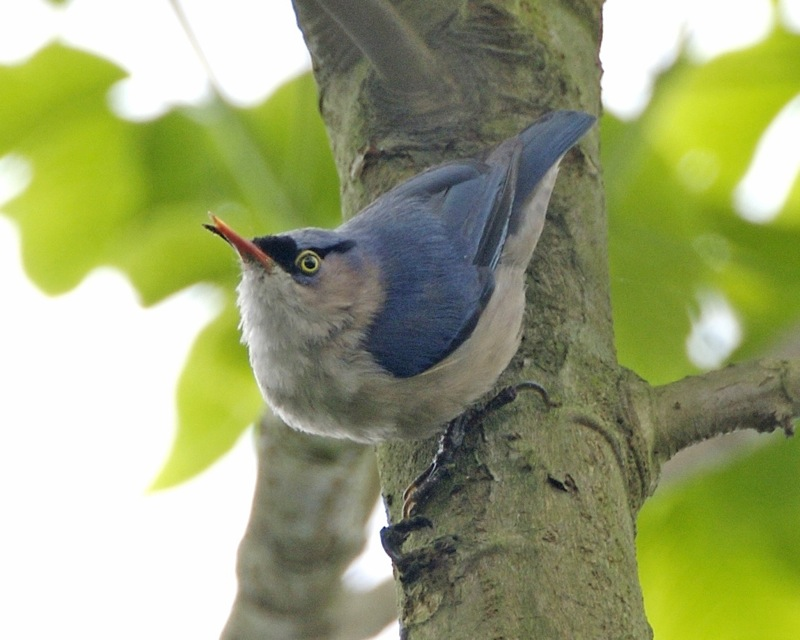
Nuthatches, such as the velvet-fronted nuthatch, have the unusual ability to climb down trees head first.

Common name	Binomial	Status
Chestnut-bellied nuthatch	Sitta cinnamoventris	
Burmese nuthatch	Sitta neglecta	
Chestnut-vented nuthatch	Sitta nagaensis	
Velvet-fronted nuthatch	Sitta frontalis	
Blue nuthatch	Sitta azurea	Accidental
Giant nuthatch	Sitta magna	Endangered
Beautiful nuthatch	Sitta formosa	

== Treecreepers ==
Order: Passeriformes Family: Certhiidae

Treecreepers are small woodland birds, brown above and white below. They have thin pointed down-curved bills, which they use to extricate insects from bark. They have stiff tail feathers, like woodpeckers, which they use to support themselves on vertical trees.

Common name	Binomial	Status
Hume's treecreeper	Certhia manipurensis	

== Spotted elachura ==
Order: Passeriformes Family: Elachuridae

This species, the only one in its family, inhabits forest undergrowth throughout South East Asia.

Common name	Binomial	Status
Spotted elachura	Elachura formosa	

== Dippers ==
Order: Passeriformes Family: Cinclidae

Dippers are a group of perching birds whose habitat includes aquatic environments in the Americas, Europe and Asia. They are named for their bobbing or dipping movements.

Common name	Binomial	Status
Brown dipper	Cinclus pallasii	Rare non-breeding visitor

== Starlings ==
Order: Passeriformes Family: Sturnidae

Starlings are small to medium-sized passerine birds. Their flight is strong and direct and they are very gregarious. Their preferred habitat is fairly open country. They eat insects and fruit. Plumage is typically dark with a metallic sheen.

Common name	Binomial	Status
Asian glossy starling	Aplonis panayensis	
Golden-crested myna	Ampeliceps coronatus	
Common hill myna	Gracula religiosa	
European starling	Sturnus vulgaris	Rare winter visitor
Rosy starling	Pastor roseus	Very rare winter visitor
Daurian starling	Agropsar sturninus	Resident and passage visitor
Chestnut-cheeked starling	Agropsar philippensis	Accidental
Black-collared starling	Gracupica nigricollis	
Siamese pied starling	Gracupica floweri	
White-shouldered starling	Sturnia sinensis	Winter visitor
Brahminy starling	Sturnia pagodarum	Accidental
Chestnut-tailed starling	Sturnia malabarica	Resident and winter visitor
Red-billed starling	Spodiopsar sericeus	Accidental
White-cheeked starling	Spodiopsar cineraceus	Accidental
Common myna	Acridotheres tristis	Range expansion through introductions
Vinous-breasted myna	Acridotheres leucocephalus	
Jungle myna	Acridotheres fuscus	
Javan myna	Acridotheres javanicus	Introduced
Great myna	Acridotheres grandis	
Crested myna	Acridotheres cristatellus	
Spot-winged starling	Saroglossa spilopterus	Rare winter visitor

== Thrushes and allies ==
Order: Passeriformes Family: Turdidae

The thrushes are a group of passerine birds that occur mainly in the Old World. They are plump, soft plumaged, small to medium-sized insectivores or sometimes omnivores, often feeding on the ground. Many have attractive songs.

Common name	Binomial	Status
Long-tailed thrush	Zoothera dixoni	Winter visitor
Himalayan thrush	Zoothera salimalii	Accidental
Dark-sided thrush	Zoothera marginata	
White's thrush	Zoothera aurea	
Scaly thrush	Zoothera dauma	Winter visitor, resident in mountains
Purple cochoa	Cochoa purpurea	Rare
Green cochoa	Cochoa viridis	
Siberian thrush	Geokichla sibirica	Winter visitor
Chestnut-capped thrush	Geokichla interpres	Rare
Orange-headed thrush	Geokichla citrina	Winter visitor
Chinese blackbird	Turdus mandarinus	
Gray-winged blackbird	Turdus boulboul	Rare winter visitor
Japanese thrush	Turdus cardis	Accidental
Black-breasted thrush	Turdus dissimilis	Rare winter visitor
Gray-sided thrush	Turdus feae	Rare winter visitor
Eyebrowed thrush	Turdus obscurus	Winter visitor
Chestnut thrush	Turdus rubrocanus	Rare winter visitor
Black-throated thrush	Turdus atrogularis	Very rare winter visitor
Red-throated thrush	Turdus ruficollis	Very rare winter visitor
Dusky thrush	Turdus eunomus	Irruptive in winter
Naumann's thrush	Turdus naumanni	Accidental

== Old World flycatchers ==
Order: Passeriformes Family: Muscicapidae

Old World flycatchers are a large group of small arboreal insectivores. The appearance of these birds is highly varied, but they mostly have weak songs and harsh calls.

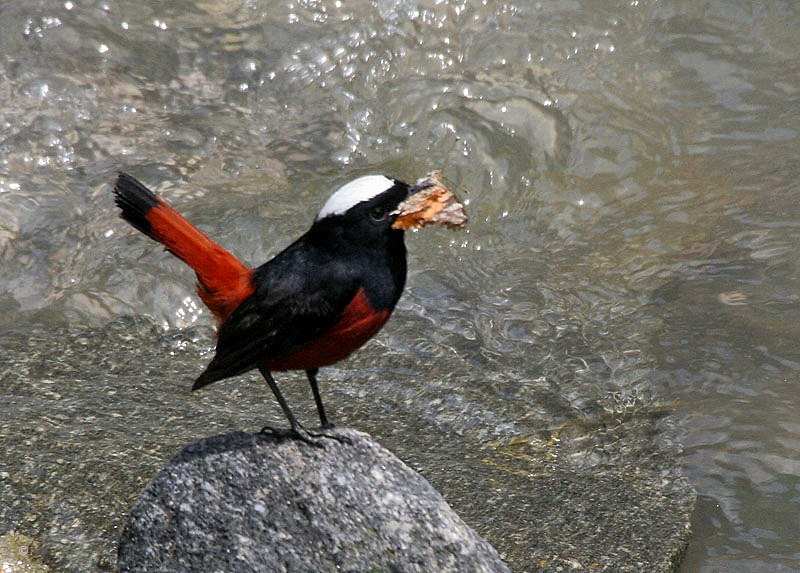
The white-capped redstart is a resident of the northern mountains of Thailand.

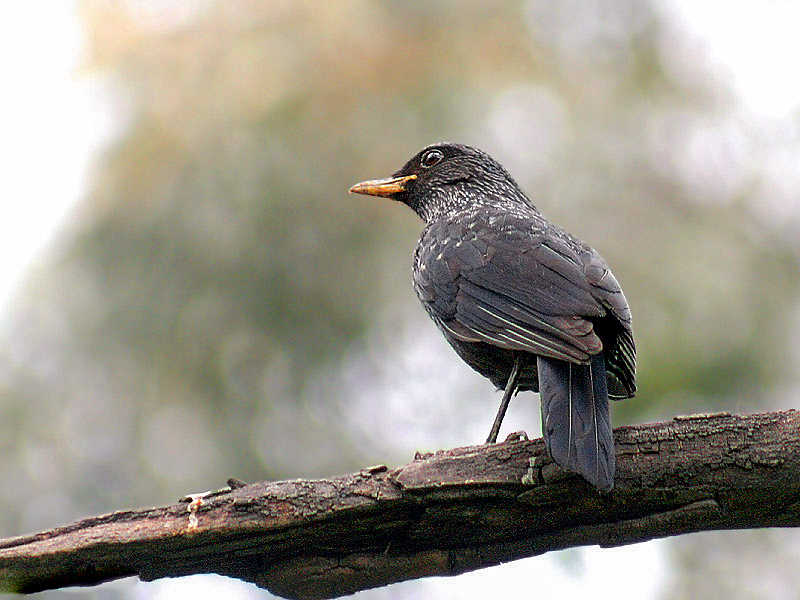
The blue whistling-thrush is a common resident and winter visitor of Thailand.

Common name	Binomial	Status
Grey-streaked flycatcher	Muscicapa griseisticta	Rare
Dark-sided flycatcher	Muscicapa sibirica	Winter visitor
Ferruginous flycatcher	Muscicapa ferruginea	Winter visitor and passage migrant
Asian brown flycatcher	Muscicapa daurica	Resident and winter visitor
Brown-breasted flycatcher	Muscicapa muttui	Very rare
Brown-streaked flycatcher	Muscicapa williamsoni	Resident and passage visitor
Oriental magpie-robin	Copsychus saularis	
Rufous-tailed shama	Copsychus pyrropygus	Rare
White-rumped shama	Copsychus malabaricus	
White-gorgeted flycatcher	Anthipes monileger	
Rufous-browed flycatcher	Anthipes solitaris	
White-tailed flycatcher	Cyornis concretus	Rare
Hainan blue flycatcher	Cyornis hainanus	
Pale blue flycatcher	Cyornis unicolor	
Blue-throated flycatcher	Cyornis rubeculoides	Resident and winter visitor
Chinese blue flycatcher	Cyornis glaucicomans	
Large blue flycatcher	Cyornis magnirostris	Winter visitor
Hill blue flycatcher	Cyornis whitei	
Malaysian blue flycatcher	Cyornis turcosus	
Indochinese blue flycatcher	Cyornis sumatrensis	
Mangrove blue flycatcher	Cyornis rufigastra	
Brown-chested jungle-flycatcher	Cyornis brunneatus	Rare on passage
Gray-chested jungle-flycatcher	Cyornis umbratilis	Rare in far south
Fulvous-chested jungle-flycatcher	Cyornis olivaceus	
Large niltava	Niltava grandis	
Small niltava	Niltava macgrigoriae	
Fujian niltava	Niltava davidi	Rare winter visitor
Rufous-bellied niltava	Niltava sundara	Winter visitor
Vivid niltava	Niltava vivida	Winter visitor
Blue-and-white flycatcher	Cyanoptila cyanomelana	Passage migrant
Zappey's flycatcher	Cyanoptila cumatilis	Passage migrant
Verditer flycatcher	Eumyias thalassinus	Resident and winter visitor
Lesser shortwing	Brachypteryx leucophrys	
Himalayan shortwing	Brachypteryx cruralis	
Rufous-tailed robin	Larvivora sibilans	Rare winter visitor
Japanese robin	Larvivora akahige	
Siberian blue robin	Larvivora cyane	Winter visitor
White-bellied redstart	Luscinia phaenicuroides	Resident and winter visitor
Bluethroat	Luscinia svecica	Winter visitor
Malayan whistling-thrush	Myophonus robinsoni	Accidental
Blue whistling-thrush	Myophonus caeruleus	Resident and winter visitor
White-crowned forktail	Enicurus leschenaulti	
Chestnut-naped forktail	Enicurus ruficapillus	
Black-backed forktail	Enicurus immaculatus	
Slaty-backed forktail	Enicurus schistaceus	
Firethroat	Calliope pectardens	Accidental
Blackthroat	Calliope obscura	Accidental
Siberian rubythroat	Calliope calliope	Winter visitor
Chinese rubythroat	Calliope tschebaiewi	Accidental
White-tailed robin	Myiomela leucura	
Blue-fronted robin	Cinclidium frontale	Status uncertain
Red-flanked bluetail	Tarsiger cyanurus	Winter visitor
Himalayan bluetail	Tarsiger rufilatus	Winter visitor
Golden bush-robin	Tarsiger chrysaeus	Rare winter visitor
Yellow-rumped flycatcher	Ficedula zanthopygia	Passage migrant
Green-backed flycatcher	Ficedula elisae	winter visitor
Narcissus flycatcher	Ficedula narcissina	Accidental
Mugimaki flycatcher	Ficedula mugimaki	Winter visitor
Slaty-backed flycatcher	Ficedula hodgsonii	Winter visitor
Slaty-blue flycatcher	Ficedula tricolor	Winter visitor
Snowy-browed flycatcher	Ficedula hyperythra	
Pygmy flycatcher	Ficedula hodgsoni	Rare winter visitor
Rufous-gorgeted flycatcher	Ficedula strophiata	Winter visitor
Sapphire flycatcher	Ficedula sapphira	Winter visitor
Little pied flycatcher	Ficedula westermanni	
Ultramarine flycatcher	Ficedula superciliaris	Winter visitor
Rusty-tailed flycatcher	Ficedula ruficauda	Accidental
Taiga flycatcher	Ficedula albicilla	Winter visitor
Red-breasted flycatcher	Ficedula parva	Accidental
Rufous-chested flycatcher	Ficedula dumetoria	
Blue-fronted redstart	Phoenicurus frontalis	Rare winter visitor
Plumbeous redstart	Phoenicurus fuliginosus	Resident and winter visitor
White-capped redstart	Phoenicurus leucocephalus	Mainly winter visitor
Black redstart	Phoenicurus ochruros	Accidental
Daurian redstart	Phoenicurus auroreus	Winter visitor
Chestnut-bellied rock-thrush	Monticola rufiventris	Winter visitor, resident on highest peaks
White-throated rock-thrush	Monticola gularis	Winter visitor
Blue rock-thrush	Monticola solitarius	Resident (ssp madoci) in far south and winter visitor
Amur stonechat	Saxicola stejnegeri	Resident
Siberian stonechat	Saxicola maurus	winter visitor
Amur stonechat	Saxicola stejnegeri	
Pied bushchat	Saxicola caprata	
Jerdon's bushchat	Saxicola jerdoni	Rare
Gray bushchat	Saxicola ferreus	Resident and winter visitor
Northern wheatear	Oenanthe oenanthe	Accidental
Isabelline wheatear	Oenanthe isabellina	Accidental
Desert wheatear	Oenanthe deserti	Accidental

== Flowerpeckers ==
Order: Passeriformes Family: Dicaeidae

The flowerpeckers are very small, stout, often brightly coloured birds, with short tails, short thick curved bills, and tubular tongues.

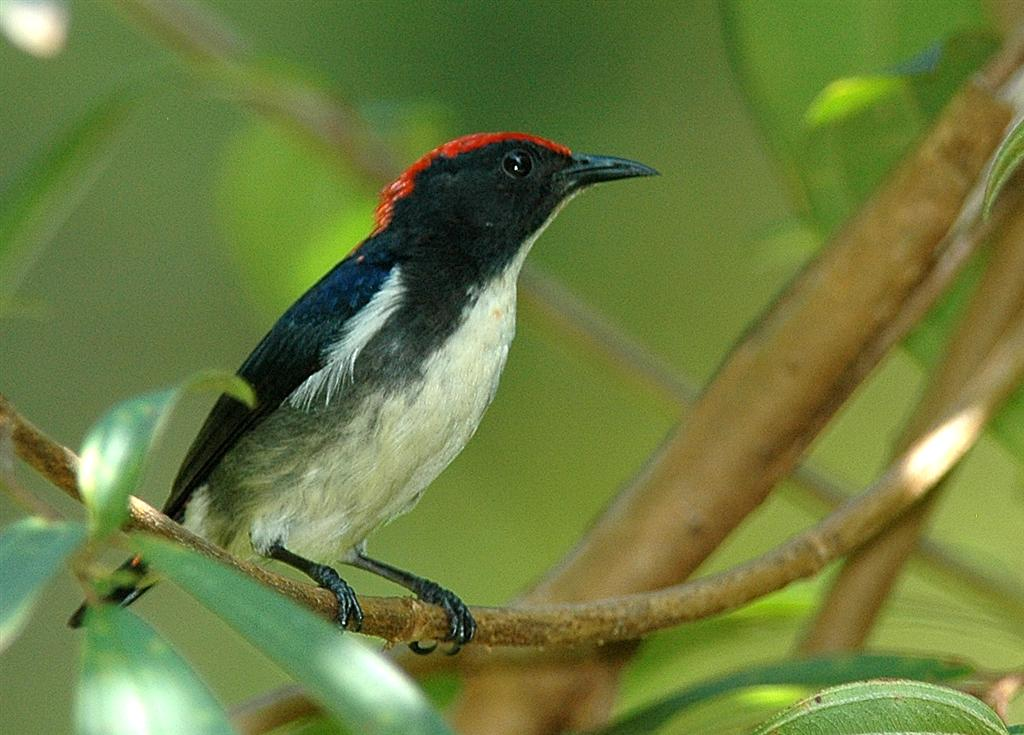
The scarlet-backed flowerpecker is a rare resident of Thailand.

Common name	Binomial	Status
Yellow-breasted flowerpecker	Prionochilus maculatus	
Crimson-breasted flowerpecker	Prionochilus percussus	
Scarlet-breasted flowerpecker	Prionochilus thoracicus	
Thick-billed flowerpecker	Dicaeum agile	
Yellow-vented flowerpecker	Dicaeum chrysorrheum	
Yellow-bellied flowerpecker	Dicaeum melanozanthum	Uncommon, may breed
Orange-bellied flowerpecker	Dicaeum trigonostigma	
Plain flowerpecker	Dicaeum minullum	
Fire-breasted flowerpecker	Dicaeum ignipectus	
Scarlet-backed flowerpecker	Dicaeum cruentatum	Rare resident in far south

== Sunbirds and spiderhunters ==
Order: Passeriformes Family: Nectariniidae

The sunbirds and spiderhunters are very small passerine birds which feed largely on nectar, although they will also take insects, especially when feeding young. Their flight is fast and direct on short wings. Most species can take nectar by hovering like a hummingbird, but usually perch to feed.

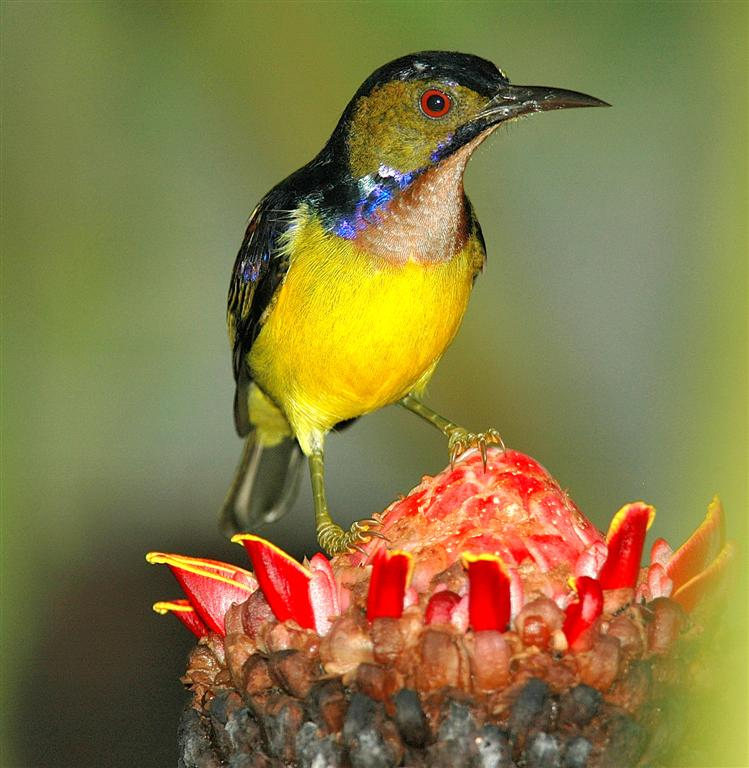
The brown-throated sunbird is fairly common in Southern Thailand.

Common name	Binomial	Status
Ruby-cheeked sunbird	Chalcoparia singalensis	
Plain sunbird	Anthreptes simplex	
Brown-throated sunbird	Anthreptes malacensis	
Red-throated sunbird	Anthreptes rhodolaemus	Rare
Van Hasselt's sunbird	Leptocoma brasiliana	
Copper-throated sunbird	Leptocoma calcostetha	
Purple sunbird	Cinnyris asiaticus	
Olive-backed sunbird	Cinnyris jugularis	
Fire-tailed sunbird	Aethopyga ignicauda	
Black-throated sunbird	Aethopyga saturata	
Mrs. Gould's sunbird	Aethopyga gouldiae	Winter visitor
Green-tailed sunbird	Aethopyga nipalensis	Resident in mountains
Temminck's sunbird	Aethopyga temminckii	Rare
Crimson sunbird	Aethopyga siparaja	
Purple-naped spiderhunter	Kurochkinegramma hypogrammicum	
Thick-billed spiderhunter	Arachnothera crassirostris	
Long-billed spiderhunter	Arachnothera robusta	Rare
Little spiderhunter	Arachnothera longirostra	
Yellow-eared spiderhunter	Arachnothera chrysogenys	
Spectacled spiderhunter	Arachnothera flavigaster	
Streaked spiderhunter	Arachnothera magna	
Gray-breasted spiderhunter	Arachnothera modesta	

== Fairy-bluebirds ==
Order: Passeriformes Family: Irenidae

The fairy-bluebirds are bulbul-like birds of open forest or thorn scrub. The males are dark-blue and the females a duller green.

Common name	Binomial	Status
Asian fairy-bluebird	Irena puella	

== Leafbirds ==
Order: Passeriformes Family: Chloropseidae

The leafbirds are small, bulbul-like birds. The males are brightly plumaged, usually in greens and yellows.

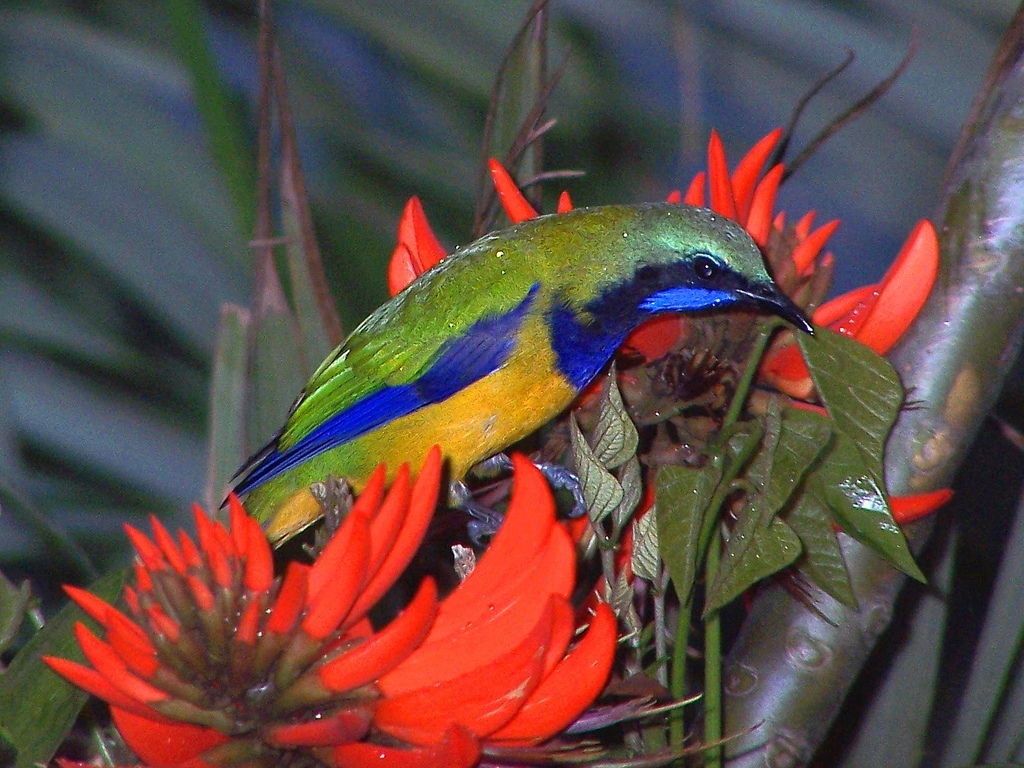
The orange-bellied leafbird is a fairly common resident of Thailand.

Common name	Binomial	Status
Greater green leafbird	Chloropsis sonnerati	
Lesser green leafbird	Chloropsis cyanopogon	
Blue-winged leafbird	Chloropsis cochinchinensis	
Golden-fronted leafbird	Chloropsis aurifrons	
Orange-bellied leafbird	Chloropsis hardwickii	

== Weavers and allies ==
Order: Passeriformes Family: Ploceidae

The weavers are small passerine birds related to the finches. They are seed-eating birds with rounded conical bills. The males of many species are brightly coloured, usually in red or yellow and black, but some species show variation in colour only in the breeding season.

Common name	Binomial	Status
Streaked weaver	Ploceus manyar	
Baya weaver	Ploceus philippinus	
Asian golden weaver	Ploceus hypoxanthus	

== Waxbills and allies ==
Order: Passeriformes Family: Estrildidae

The estrildid finches are small passerine birds of the Old World tropics and Australasia. They are gregarious and often colonial seed eaters with short thick but pointed bills. They are all similar in structure and habits, but have wide variation in plumage colours and patterns.

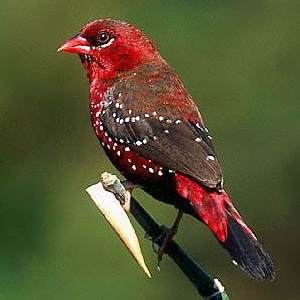
The red avadavat is an uncommon resident of Thailand.

Common name	Binomial	Status
Java sparrow	Padda oryzivora	Introduced, endangered
Scaly-breasted munia	Lonchura punctulata	
White-rumped munia	Lonchura striata	
White-bellied munia	Lonchura leucogastra	
Chestnut munia	Lonchura atricapilla	
White-headed munia	Lonchura maja	
Pin-tailed parrotfinch	Erythrura prasina	
Red avadavat	Amandava amandava	

== Old World sparrows ==
Order: Passeriformes Family: Passeridae

Sparrows are small passerine birds, typically small, plump, brown or grey with short tails and short powerful beaks. They are seed-eaters, but also consume small insects.

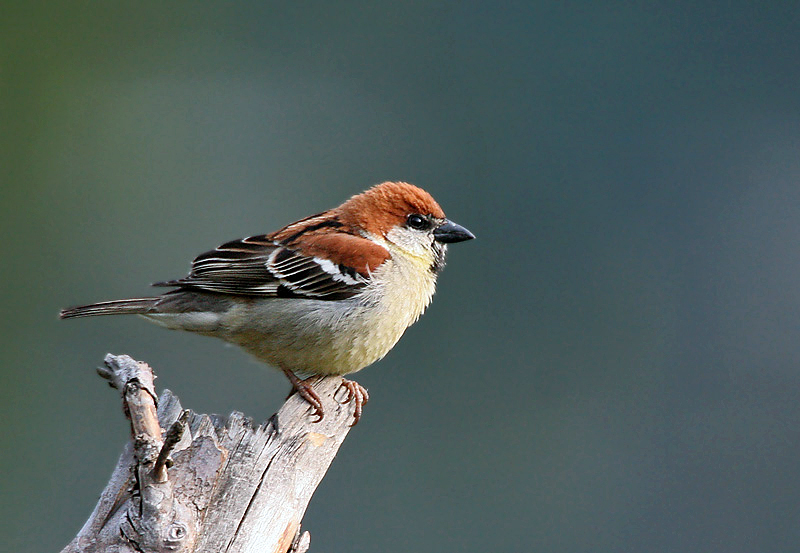
The russet sparrow is rarely found in Thailand in winter.

Common name	Binomial	Status
House sparrow	Passer domesticus	Recent colonist
Russet sparrow	Passer cinnamomeus	Rare winter visitor
Plain-backed sparrow	Passer flaveolus	
Eurasian tree sparrow	Passer montanus	

== Wagtails and pipits ==
Order: Passeriformes Family: Motacillidae

Motacillidae is a family of small passerine birds with medium to long tails and comprises the wagtails, longclaws, and pipits. These are slender ground-feeding insectivores of open country.

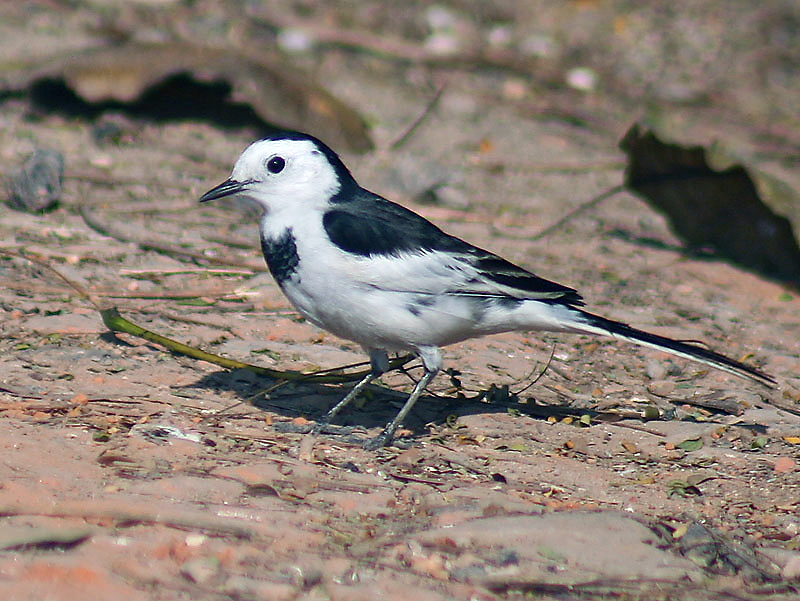
Of the three white wagtail subspecies that winter in Thailand, M. a. leucopsis is most common.

Common name	Binomial	Status
Forest wagtail	Dendronanthus indicus	Winter visitor
Gray wagtail	Motacilla cinerea	Winter visitor
Western yellow wagtail	Motacilla flava	Winter visitor
Eastern yellow wagtail	Motacilla tschutschensis	
Citrine wagtail	Motacilla citreola	Winter visitor
Mekong wagtail	Motacilla samveasnae	
White wagtail	Motacilla alba	Winter visitor
Richard's pipit	Anthus richardi	Winter visitor
Paddyfield pipit	Anthus rufulus	
Blyth's pipit	Anthus godlewskii	Accidental
Rosy pipit	Anthus roseatus	Localised winter visitor
Olive-backed pipit	Anthus hodgsoni	Winter visitor
Red-throated pipit	Anthus cervinus	Winter visitor
American pipit	Anthus rubescens	Accidental

== Finches, euphonias, and allies ==
Order: Passeriformes Family: Fringillidae

Finches are small to moderately large seed-eating passerine birds with a strong beak, usually conical and in some species very large. All have 12 tail feathers and nine primary flight feathers. Finches have a bouncing flight, alternating bouts of flapping with gliding on closed wings, and most sing well.

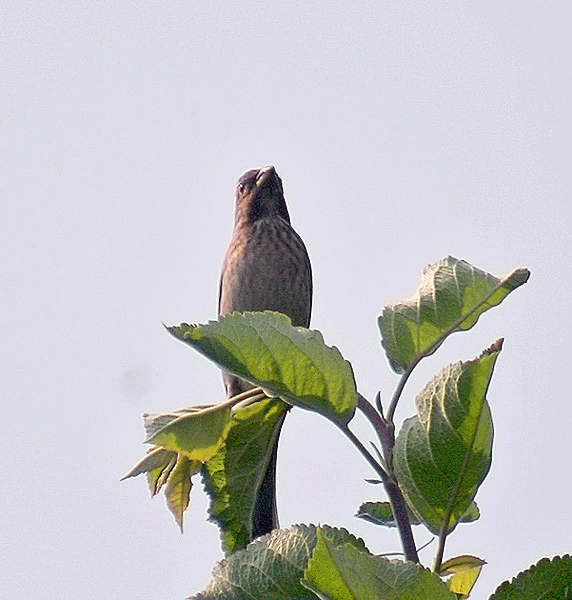
The common rosefinch is a common winter visitor of Thailand.

Common name	Binomial	Status
Common chaffinch	Fringilla coelebs	Accidental
Brambling	Fringilla montifringilla	Accidental
Collared grosbeak	Mycerobas affinis	Accidental
Spot-winged grosbeak	Mycerobas melanozanthos	
Yellow-billed grosbeak	Eophona migratoria	Accidental
Japanese grosbeak	Eophona personata	Accidental
Common rosefinch	Carpodacus erythrinus	Winter visitor
Scarlet finch	Carpodacus sipahi	
Dark-breasted rosefinch	Carpodacus nipalensis	Winter visitor
Oriental greenfinch	Chloris sinica	Rare winter visitor
Black-headed greenfinch	Chloris ambigua	Rare winter visitor

== Longspurs and snow buntings ==
Order: Passeriformes Family: Calcariidae

The Calcariidae are a family of birds that had been traditionally grouped with the New World sparrows, but differ in a number of respects and are usually found in open grassy areas.

Common name	Binomial	Status
Lapland longspur	Calcarius lapponicus	Accidental

== Old World buntings ==
Order: Passeriformes Family: Emberizidae

The emberizids are a large family of seed-eating birds with distinctively shaped bills. Many emberizid species have distinctive head patterns.

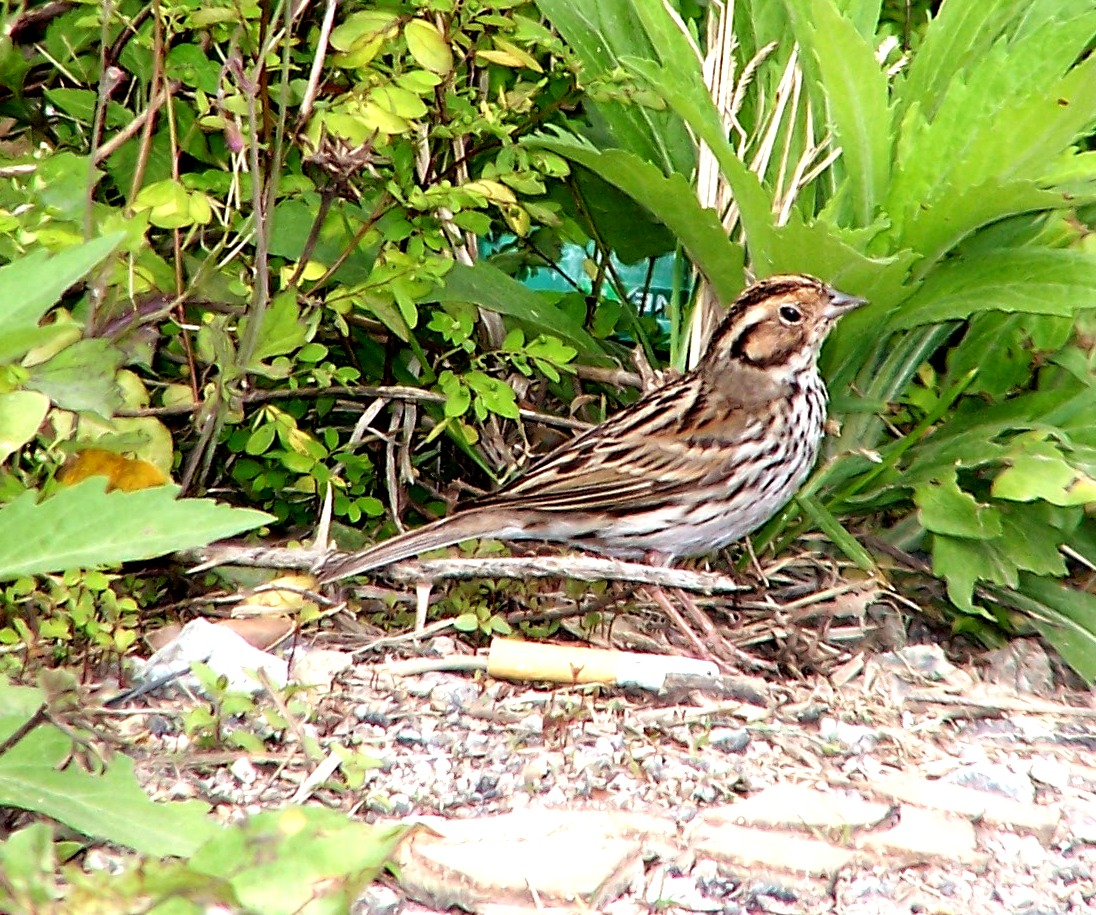
The little bunting is a common winter visitor of Thailand.

Common name	Binomial	Status
Crested bunting	Emberiza lathami	Winter visitor
Black-headed bunting	Emberiza melanocephala	Accidental
Red-headed bunting	Emberiza bruniceps	Accidental
Chestnut-eared bunting	Emberiza fucata	Winter visitor
Pine bunting	Emberiza leucocephalos	Accidental
Gray-necked bunting	Emberiza buchanani	Rare
Yellow-breasted bunting	Emberiza aureola	Winter visitor, critically endangered
Little bunting	Emberiza pusilla	Winter visitor
Black-faced bunting	Emberiza spodocephala	Rare winter visitor
Chestnut bunting	Emberiza rutila	Winter visitor
Tristram's bunting	Emberiza tristrami	Accidental

== See also ==
- List of species native to Thailand
- List of birds
- Lists of birds by region
