= List of birds of Malaysia =

This is a list of the bird species recorded in Malaysia. The avifauna of Malaysia include a total of 855 species, of which 17 are endemic, and 19 have been introduced by humans. 63 species are globally threatened.

This list's taxonomic treatment (designation and sequence of orders, families and species) and nomenclature (common and scientific names) follow the conventions of The Clements Checklist of Birds of the World, 2022 edition. The family accounts at the beginning of each heading reflect this taxonomy, as do the species counts found in each family account.

The following tags have been used to highlight several categories, but not all species fall into one of these categories. Those that do not are commonly occurring native species.

- (A) Accidental - a species that rarely or accidentally occurs in Malaysia
- (E) Endemic - a species endemic to Malaysia
- (Ex) Extirpated - a species that no longer occurs in Malaysia although populations exist elsewhere
- (I) Introduced - a species introduced to Malaysia as a consequence, direct or indirect, of human actions

== Ducks, geese, and waterfowl ==
Order: Anseriformes Family: Anatidae

Anatidae includes the ducks and most duck-like waterfowl, such as geese and swans. These birds are adapted to an aquatic existence with webbed feet, flattened bills, and feathers that are excellent at shedding water due to an oily coating.

- Wandering whistling-duck, Dendrocygna arcuata
- Lesser whistling-duck, Dendrocygna javanica
- Knob-billed duck, Sarkidiornis melanotos
- Cotton pygmy-goose, Nettapus coromandelianus
- Garganey, Spatula querquedula
- Northern shoveler, Spatula clypeata (A)
- Eurasian wigeon, Mareca penelope (A)
- Eastern spot-billed duck, Anas zonorhyncha (A)
- Mallard, Anas platyrhynchos (A)
- Northern pintail, Anas acuta (A)
- Green-winged teal, Anas crecca (A)
- Sunda teal, Anas gibberifrons (A)
- White-winged duck, Cairina scutulata (Ex)
- Tufted duck, Aythya fuligula

== Megapodes ==
Order: Galliformes Family: Megapodiidae

The Megapodiidae are stocky, medium-large chicken-like birds with small heads and large feet. All but the malleefowl occupy jungle habitats and most have brown or black colouring.

- Tabon scrubfowl, Megapodius cumingii

== Pheasants, grouse, and allies ==
Order: Galliformes Family: Phasianidae

The Phasianidae are a family of terrestrial birds. In general, they are plump (although they vary in size) and have broad, relatively short wings.

- Ferruginous partridge, Caloperdix oculea
- Crested partridge, Rollulus rouloul
- Black partridge, Melanoperdix niger
- Malayan partridge, Arborophila campbelli
- Red-breasted partridge, Arborophila hyperythra
- Chestnut-necklaced partridge, Tropicoperdix charltonii
- Sabah partridge, Tropicoperdix graydoni
- Long-billed partridge, Rhizothera longirostris
- Dulit partridge, Rhizothera dulitensis (E)
- Malayan crested argus, Rheinardia nigrescens
- Great argus, Argusianus argus
- Green peafowl, Pavo muticus (Ex)
- Crimson-headed partridge, Haematortyx sanguiniceps
- Malayan peacock-pheasant, Polyplectron malacense
- Bornean peacock-pheasant, Polyplectron schleiermacheri
- Mountain peacock-pheasant, Polyplectron inopinatum (E)
- Blue-breasted quail, Synoicus chinensis
- Red junglefowl, Gallus gallus
- Bulwer's pheasant, Lophura bulweri
- Malayan crestless fireback, Lophura erythrophthalma
- Bornean crestless fireback, Lophura pyronota
- Malayan crested fireback, Lophura rufa
- Bornean crested fireback, Lophura ignita

== Flamingos ==
Order: Phoenicopteriformes Family: Phoenicopteridae

Flamingos are gregarious wading birds, usually 3 to 5 feet (0.9 to 1.5 m) tall, found in both the Western and Eastern Hemispheres. Flamingos filter-feed on shellfish and algae. Their oddly shaped beaks are specially adapted to separate mud and silt from the food they consume and, uniquely, are used upside-down.

- Lesser flamingo, Phoeniconaias minor (A)

== Grebes ==
Order: Podicipediformes Family: Podicipedidae

Grebes are small to medium-large freshwater diving birds. They have lobed toes and are excellent swimmers and divers. However, they have their feet placed far back on the body, making them quite ungainly on land.

- Little grebe, Tachybaptus ruficollis

== Pigeons and doves ==
Order: Columbiformes Family: Columbidae

Pigeons and doves are stout-bodied birds with short necks and short slender bills with a fleshy cere.

- Rock pigeon, Columba livia (I)
- Silvery wood-pigeon, Columba argentina (E)
- Metallic pigeon, Columba vitiensis
- Philippine collared-dove, Streptopelia dusumieri (A)
- Red collared-dove, Streptopelia tranquebarica
- Spotted dove, Spilopelia chinensis
- Barred cuckoo-dove, Macropygia unchall
- Philippine cuckoo-dove, Macropygia tenuirostris
- Little cuckoo-dove, Macropygia ruficeps
- Asian emerald dove, Chalcophaps indica
- Zebra dove, Geopelia striata
- Nicobar pigeon, Caloenas nicobarica
- Little green-pigeon, Treron olax
- Pink-necked green-pigeon, Treron vernans
- Cinnamon-headed green-pigeon, Treron fulvicollis
- Orange-breasted green-pigeon, Treron bicincta
- Thick-billed green-pigeon, Treron curvirostra
- Large green-pigeon, Treron capellei
- Yellow-vented green-pigeon, Treron seimundi
- Wedge-tailed green-pigeon, Treron sphenura
- Jambu fruit-dove, Ptilinopus jambu
- Black-naped fruit-dove, Ptilinopus melanospila
- Green imperial-pigeon, Ducula aenea
- Gray imperial-pigeon, Ducula pickeringii
- Mountain imperial-pigeon, Ducula badia
- Pied imperial-pigeon, Ducula bicolor

== Cuckoos ==
Order: Cuculiformes Family: Cuculidae

The family Cuculidae includes cuckoos, roadrunners and anis. These birds are of variable size with slender bodies, long tails and strong legs. The Old World cuckoos are brood parasites.

- Bornean ground-cuckoo, Carpococcyx radiatus
- Short-toed coucal, Centropus rectunguis
- Greater coucal, Centropus sinensis
- Lesser coucal, Centropus bengalensis
- Raffles's malkoha, Rhinortha chlorophaea
- Red-billed malkoha, Zanclostomus javanicus
- Chestnut-breasted malkoha, Phaenicophaeus curvirostris
- Chestnut-bellied malkoha, Phaenicophaeus sumatranus
- Black-bellied malkoha, Phaenicophaeus diardi
- Green-billed malkoha, Phaenicophaeus tristis
- Chestnut-winged cuckoo, Clamator coromandus
- Pied cuckoo, Clamator jacobinus (A)
- Asian koel, Eudynamys scolopaceus
- Asian emerald cuckoo, Chrysococcyx maculatus
- Violet cuckoo, Chrysococcyx xanthorhynchus
- Horsfield's bronze cuckoo, Chrysococcyx basalis (A)
- Little bronze cuckoo, Chrysococcyx minutillus
- Banded bay cuckoo, Cacomantis sonneratii
- Plaintive cuckoo, Cacomantis merulinus
- Brush cuckoo, Cacomantis variolosus
- Square-tailed drongo-cuckoo, Surniculus lugubris
- Moustached hawk-cuckoo, Hierococcyx vagans
- Large hawk-cuckoo, Hierococcyx sparverioides
- Dark hawk-cuckoo, Hierococcyx bocki
- Northern hawk-cuckoo, Hierococcyx hyperythrus
- Hodgson's hawk-cuckoo, Hierococcyx nisicolor
- Malaysian hawk-cuckoo, Hierococcyx fugax
- Indian cuckoo, Cuculus micropterus
- Himalayan cuckoo, Cuculus saturatus
- Sunda cuckoo, Cuculus lepidus
- Oriental cuckoo, Cuculus optatus

== Frogmouths ==
Order: Caprimulgiformes Family: Podargidae

The frogmouths are a group of nocturnal birds related to the nightjars. They are named for their large flattened hooked bill and huge frog-like gape, which they use to take insects.

- Large frogmouth, Batrachostomus auritus
- Dulit frogmouth, Batrachostomus harterti (E)
- Gould's frogmouth, Batrachostomus stellatus
- Bornean frogmouth, Batrachostomus mixtus
- Blyth's frogmouth, Batrachostomus affinis
- Palawan frogmouth, Batrachostomus chaseni
- Sunda frogmouth, Batrachostomus cornutus

== Nightjars and allies ==
Order: Caprimulgiformes Family: Caprimulgidae

Nightjars are medium-sized nocturnal birds that usually nest on the ground. They have long wings, short legs and very short bills. Most have small feet, of little use for walking, and long pointed wings. Their soft plumage is camouflaged to resemble bark or leaves.

- Malaysian eared-nightjar, Lyncornis temminckii
- Great eared-nightjar, Lyncornis macrotis
- Gray nightjar, Caprimulgus jotaka
- Large-tailed nightjar, Caprimulgus macrurus
- Savanna nightjar, Caprimulgus affinis
- Bonaparte's nightjar, Caprimulgus concretus

== Swifts ==
Order: Caprimulgiformes Family: Apodidae

Swifts are small birds which spend the majority of their lives flying. These birds have very short legs and never settle voluntarily on the ground, perching instead only on vertical surfaces. Many swifts have long swept-back wings which resemble a crescent or boomerang. There are 18 species which have been recorded in Malaysia.

- Silver-rumped needletail, Rhaphidura leucopygialis
- White-throated needletail, Hirundapus caudacutus
- Silver-backed needletail, Hirundapus cochinchinensis
- Brown-backed needletail, Hirundapus giganteus
- Waterfall swift, Hydrochous gigas
- Bornean swiftlet, Collocalia dodgei (E)
- Cave swiftlet, Collocalia linchi
- Plume-toed swiftlet, Collocalia affinis
- Himalayan swiftlet, Aerodramus brevirostris
- Ameline swiftlet, Aerodramus amelis
- Mossy-nest swiftlet, Aerodramus salangana
- Black-nest swiftlet, Aerodramus maximus
- White-nest swiftlet, Aerodramus fuciphagus
- German's swiftlet, Aerodramus germani
- Pacific swift, Apus pacificus
- Cook's swift, Apus cooki
- House swift, Apus nipalensis
- Asian palm-swift, Cypsiurus balasiensis

== Treeswifts ==
Order: Caprimulgiformes Family: Hemiprocnidae

The treeswifts, also called crested swifts, are closely related to the true swifts. They differ from the other swifts in that they have crests, long forked tails and softer plumage.

- Gray-rumped treeswift, Hemiprocne longipennis
- Whiskered treeswift, Hemiprocne comata

== Rails, gallinules and coots ==
Order: Gruiformes Family: Rallidae

Rallidae is a large family of small to medium-sized birds which includes the rails, crakes, coots and gallinules. Typically they inhabit dense vegetation in damp environments near lakes, swamps or rivers. In general they are shy and secretive birds, making them difficult to observe. Most species have strong legs and long toes which are well adapted to soft uneven surfaces. They tend to have short, rounded wings and to be weak fliers.

- Brown-cheeked rail, Rallus indicus (A)
- Slaty-breasted rail, Lewinia striata
- Buff-banded rail, Gallirallus philippensis (A)
- Barred rail, Gallirallus torquatus (A)
- Eurasian moorhen, Gallinula chloropus
- Eurasian coot, Fulica atra (A)
- Black-backed swamphen, Porphyrio indicus
- Gray-headed swamphen, Porphyrio poliocephalus
- Watercock, Gallicrex cinerea
- White-breasted waterhen, Amaurornis phoenicurus
- White-browed crake, Poliolimnas cinereus
- Red-legged crake, Rallina fasciata
- Slaty-legged crake, Rallina eurizonoides
- Ruddy-breasted crake, Zapornia fusca
- Band-bellied crake, Zapornia paykullii
- Baillon's crake, Zapornia pusilla

== Finfoots ==
Order: Gruiformes Family: Heliornithidae

Heliornithidae is a small family of tropical birds with webbed lobes on their feet similar to those of grebes and coots.

- Masked finfoot, Heliopais personata

== Cranes ==
Order: Gruiformes Family: Gruidae

Cranes are large, long-legged and long-necked birds. Unlike the similar-looking but unrelated herons, cranes fly with necks outstretched, not pulled back. Most have elaborate and noisy courting displays or "dances".

- Sarus crane, Antigone antigone (Ex)

== Thick-knees ==
Order: Charadriiformes Family: Burhinidae

The thick-knees are a group of largely tropical waders in the family Burhinidae. They are found worldwide within the tropical zone, with some species also breeding in temperate Europe and Australia. They are medium to large waders with strong black or yellow-black bills, large yellow eyes and cryptic plumage. Despite being classed as waders, most species have a preference for arid or semi-arid habitats.

- Beach thick-knee, Esacus magnirostris

== Stilts and avocets ==
Order: Charadriiformes Family: Recurvirostridae

Recurvirostridae is a family of large wading birds, which includes the avocets and stilts. The avocets have long legs and long up-curved bills. The stilts have extremely long legs and long, thin, straight bills.

- Black-winged stilt, Himantopus himantopus
- Pied stilt, Himantopus leucocephalus
- Pied avocet, Recurvirostra avosetta (A)

== Oystercatchers ==
Order: Charadriiformes Family: Haematopodidae

The oystercatchers are large and noisy plover-like birds, with strong bills used for smashing or prising open molluscs.

- Eurasian oystercatcher, Haematopus ostralegus (A)

== Plovers and lapwings ==
Order: Charadriiformes Family: Charadriidae

The family Charadriidae includes the plovers, dotterels and lapwings. They are small to medium-sized birds with compact bodies, short, thick necks and long, usually pointed, wings. They are found in open country worldwide, mostly in habitats near water.

- Black-bellied plover, Pluvialis squatarola
- Pacific golden-plover, Pluvialis fulva
- Northern lapwing, Vanellus vanellus (A)
- Yellow-wattled lapwing, Vanellus malabaricus (A)
- Gray-headed lapwing, Vanellus cinereus
- Red-wattled lapwing, Vanellus indicus
- Lesser sand-plover, Charadrius mongolus
- Greater sand-plover, Charadrius leschenaultii
- Malaysian plover, Charadrius peronii
- Kentish plover, Charadrius alexandrinus
- White-faced plover, Charadrius dealbatus
- Common ringed plover, Charadrius hiaticula (A)
- Long-billed plover, Charadrius placidus (A)
- Little ringed plover, Charadrius dubius
- Oriental plover, Charadrius veredus

== Painted-snipes ==
Order: Charadriiformes Family: Rostratulidae

Painted-snipes are short-legged, long-billed birds similar in shape to the true snipes, but more brightly coloured.

- Greater painted-snipe, Rostratula benghalensis

== Jacanas ==
Order: Charadriiformes Family: Jacanidae

The jacanas are a group of tropical waders in the family Jacanidae. They are found throughout the tropics. They are identifiable by their huge feet and claws which enable them to walk on floating vegetation in the shallow lakes that are their preferred habitat.

- Pheasant-tailed jacana, Hydrophasianus chirurgus
- Bronze-winged jacana, Metopidius indicus (A)

== Sandpipers and allies ==
Order: Charadriiformes Family: Scolopacidae

Scolopacidae is a large diverse family of small to medium-sized shorebirds including the sandpipers, curlews, godwits, shanks, tattlers, woodcocks, snipes, dowitchers and phalaropes. The majority of these species eat small invertebrates picked out of the mud or soil. Variation in length of legs and bills enables multiple species to feed in the same habitat, particularly on the coast, without direct competition for food.

- Whimbrel, Numenius phaeopus
- Little curlew, Numenius minutus (A)
- Far Eastern curlew, Numenius madagascariensis
- Eurasian curlew, Numenius arquata
- Bar-tailed godwit, Limosa lapponica
- Black-tailed godwit, Limosa limosa
- Ruddy turnstone, Arenaria interpres
- Great knot, Calidris tenuirostris
- Red knot, Calidris canutus
- Ruff, Calidris pugnax
- Broad-billed sandpiper, Calidris falcinellus
- Sharp-tailed sandpiper, Calidris acuminata
- Curlew sandpiper, Calidris ferruginea
- Temminck's stint, Calidris temminckii
- Long-toed stint, Calidris subminuta
- Spoon-billed sandpiper, Calidris pygmea (A)
- Red-necked stint, Calidris ruficollis
- Sanderling, Calidris alba
- Dunlin, Calidris alpina (A)
- Little stint, Calidris minuta
- Pectoral sandpiper, Calidris melanotos (A)
- Asian dowitcher, Limnodromus semipalmatus
- Long-billed dowitcher, Limnodromus scolopaceus (A)
- Eurasian woodcock, Scolopax rusticola (A)
- Latham's snipe, Gallinago hardwickii (A)
- Common snipe, Gallinago gallinago
- Pin-tailed snipe, Gallinago stenura
- Swinhoe's snipe, Gallinago megala
- Terek sandpiper, Xenus cinereus
- Red-necked phalarope, Phalaropus lobatus
- Red phalarope, Phalaropus fulicarius (A)
- Common sandpiper, Actitis hypoleucos
- Green sandpiper, Tringa ochropus
- Gray-tailed tattler, Tringa brevipes
- Spotted redshank, Tringa erythropus (A)
- Common greenshank, Tringa nebularia
- Nordmann's greenshank, Tringa guttifer
- Marsh sandpiper, Tringa stagnatilis
- Wood sandpiper, Tringa glareola
- Common redshank, Tringa totanus

== Buttonquail ==
Order: Charadriiformes Family: Turnicidae

The buttonquail are small, drab, running birds which resemble the true quails. The female is the brighter of the sexes and initiates courtship. The male incubates the eggs and tends the young.

- Small buttonquail, Turnix sylvaticus
- Yellow-legged buttonquail, Turnix tanki (A)
- Barred buttonquail, Turnix suscitator

== Crab-plover ==
Order: Charadriiformes Family: Dromadidae

The crab-plover is related to the waders. It resembles a plover but with very long grey legs and a strong heavy black bill similar to a tern. It has black-and-white plumage, a long neck, partially webbed feet and a bill designed for eating crabs.

- Crab-plover, Dromas ardeola (A)

== Pratincoles and coursers ==
Order: Charadriiformes Family: Glareolidae

Glareolidae is a family of wading birds comprising the pratincoles, which have short legs, long pointed wings and long forked tails, and the coursers, which have long legs, short wings and long, pointed bills which curve downwards.

- Australian pratincole, Stiltia isabella (A)
- Oriental pratincole, Glareola maldivarum
- Small pratincole, Glareola lactea (A)

== Skuas and jaegers ==
Order: Charadriiformes Family: Stercorariidae

The family Stercorariidae are, in general, medium to large birds, typically with grey or brown plumage, often with white markings on the wings. They nest on the ground in temperate and arctic regions and are long-distance migrants.

- Pomarine jaeger, Stercorarius pomarinus
- Parasitic jaeger, Stercorarius parasiticus
- Long-tailed jaeger, Stercorarius longicaudus

== Gulls, terns, and skimmers ==
Order: Charadriiformes Family: Laridae

Laridae is a family of medium to large seabirds, the gulls, terns, and skimmers. Gulls are typically grey or white, often with black markings on the head or wings. They have stout, longish bills and webbed feet. Terns are a group of generally medium to large seabirds typically with grey or white plumage, often with black markings on the head. Most terns hunt fish by diving but some pick insects off the surface of fresh water. Terns are generally long-lived birds, with several species known to live in excess of 30 years.

- Slender-billed gull, Chroicocephalus genei (A)
- Black-headed gull, Chroicocephalus ridibundus
- Brown-headed gull, Chroicocephalus brunnicephalus
- Little gull, Hydrocoloeus minutus (A)
- Laughing gull, Leucophaeus atricilla (A)
- Black-tailed gull, Larus crassirostris (A)
- Black-tailed gull, Larus crassirostris (A)
- Lesser black-backed gull, Larus fuscus (A)
- Brown noddy, Anous stolidus
- Black noddy, Anous minutus
- Sooty tern, Onychoprion fuscatus
- Bridled tern, Onychoprion anaethetus
- Aleutian tern, Onychoprion aleuticus
- Little tern, Sternula albifrons
- Gull-billed tern, Gelochelidon nilotica
- Caspian tern, Hydroprogne caspia
- White-winged tern, Chlidonias leucopterus
- Whiskered tern, Chlidonias hybrida
- Roseate tern, Sterna dougallii
- Black-naped tern, Sterna sumatrana
- Common tern, Sterna hirundo
- Great crested tern, Thalasseus bergii
- Lesser crested tern, Thalasseus bengalensis
- Chinese crested tern, Thalasseus bernsteini (A)

== Tropicbirds ==
Order: Phaethontiformes Family: Phaethontidae

Tropicbirds are slender white birds of tropical oceans, with exceptionally long central tail feathers. Their heads and long wings have black markings.

- White-tailed tropicbird, Phaethon lepturus (A)

== Southern storm-petrels ==
Order: Procellariiformes Family: Oceanitidae

The southern storm-petrels are relatives of the petrels and are the smallest seabirds. They feed on planktonic crustaceans and small fish picked from the surface, typically while hovering. The flight is fluttering and sometimes bat-like.

- Wilson's storm-petrel, Oceanites oceanicus

== Northern storm-petrels ==
Order: Procellariiformes Family: Hydrobatidae

Though the members of this family are similar in many respects to the southern storm-petrels, including their general appearance and habits, there are enough genetic differences to warrant their placement in a separate family.

- Swinhoe's storm-petrel, Hydrobates monorhis

== Shearwaters and petrels ==
Order: Procellariiformes Family: Procellariidae

The procellariids are the main group of medium-sized "true petrels", characterised by united nostrils with medium septum and a long outer functional primary.

- Bulwer's petrel, Bulweria bulwerii
- Streaked shearwater, Calonectris leucomelas
- Wedge-tailed shearwater, Ardenna pacifica
- Short-tailed shearwater, Ardenna tenuirostris

== Storks ==
Order: Ciconiiformes Family: Ciconiidae

Storks are large, long-legged, long-necked, wading birds with long, stout bills. Storks are mute, but bill-clattering is an important mode of communication at the nest. Their nests can be large and may be reused for many years. Many species are migratory.

- Asian openbill, Anastomus oscitans (A)
- Asian woolly-necked stork, Ciconia episcopus (A)
- Storm's stork, Ciconia stormi
- Lesser adjutant, Leptoptilos javanicus
- Milky stork, Mycteria cinerea
- Painted stork, Mycteria leucocephala (A)

== Frigatebirds ==
Order: Suliformes Family: Fregatidae

Frigatebirds are large seabirds usually found over tropical oceans. They are large, black-and-white or completely black, with long wings and deeply forked tails. The males have coloured inflatable throat pouches. They do not swim or walk and cannot take off from a flat surface. Having the largest wingspan-to-body-weight ratio of any bird, they are essentially aerial, able to stay aloft for more than a week.

- Lesser frigatebird, Fregata ariel
- Christmas Island frigatebird, Fregata andrewsi
- Great frigatebird, Fregata minor

== Boobies and gannets ==
Order: Suliformes Family: Sulidae

The sulids comprise the gannets and boobies. Both groups are medium to large coastal seabirds that plunge-dive for fish.

- Masked booby, Sula dactylatra (A)
- Brown booby, Sula leucogaster
- Red-footed booby, Sula sula (A)

== Anhingas ==
Order: Suliformes Family: Anhingidae

Anhingas or darters are often called "snake-birds" because of their long thin neck, which gives a snake-like appearance when they swim with their bodies submerged. The males have black and dark-brown plumage, an erectile crest on the nape and a larger bill than the female. The females have much paler plumage especially on the neck and underparts. The darters have completely webbed feet and their legs are short and set far back on the body. Their plumage is somewhat permeable, like that of cormorants, and they spread their wings to dry after diving.

- Oriental darter, Anhinga melanogaster (A)

== Cormorants and shags ==
Order: Suliformes Family: Phalacrocoracidae

Phalacrocoracidae is a family of medium to large coastal, fish-eating seabirds that includes cormorants and shags. Plumage colouration varies, with the majority having mainly dark plumage, some species being black-and-white and a few being colourful.

- Little cormorant, Microcarbo niger
- Great cormorant, Phalacrocorax carbo (A)

== Pelicans ==
Order: Pelecaniformes Family: Pelecanidae

Pelicans are large water birds with a distinctive pouch under their beak. As with other members of the order Pelecaniformes, they have webbed feet with four toes. T

- Great white pelican, Pelecanus onocrotalus (A)
- Spot-billed pelican, Pelecanus philippensis (A)

== Herons, egrets, and bitterns ==
Order: Pelecaniformes Family: Ardeidae

The family Ardeidae contains the bitterns, herons and egrets. Herons and egrets are medium to large wading birds with long necks and legs. Bitterns tend to be shorter necked and more wary. Members of Ardeidae fly with their necks retracted, unlike other long-necked birds such as storks, ibises and spoonbills.

- Great bittern, Botaurus stellaris (A)
- Yellow bittern, Ixobrychus sinensis
- Schrenck's bittern, Ixobrychus eurhythmus
- Cinnamon bittern, Ixobrychus cinnamomeus
- Black bittern, Ixobrychus flavicollis
- Gray heron, Ardea cinerea
- Great-billed heron, Ardea sumatrana
- Purple heron, Ardea purpurea
- Great egret, Ardea alba
- Intermediate egret, Ardea intermedia
- Chinese egret, Egretta eulophotes
- Little egret, Egretta garzetta
- Pacific reef-heron, Egretta sacra
- Eastern cattle egret, Ardea coromanda
- Indian pond-heron, Ardeola grayii
- Chinese pond-heron, Ardeola bacchus
- Javan pond-heron, Ardeola speciosa
- Striated heron, Butorides striata
- Black-crowned night-heron, Nycticorax nycticorax
- Nankeen night-heron, Nycticorax caledonicus
- Japanese night-heron, Gorsachius goisagi (A)
- Malayan night-heron, Gorsachius melanolophus

== Ibises and spoonbills ==
Order: Pelecaniformes Family: Threskiornithidae

Threskiornithidae is a family of large terrestrial and wading birds which includes the ibises and spoonbills. They have long, broad wings with 11 primary and about 20 secondary feathers. They are strong fliers and despite their size and weight, very capable soarers.

- Glossy ibis, Plegadis falcinellus (A)
- Black-headed ibis, Threskiornis melanocephalus (A)
- White-shouldered ibis, Pseudibis davisoni (Ex?) (Note: Possibly extirpated according to IUCN)

== Osprey ==
Order: Accipitriformes Family: Pandionidae

The family Pandionidae contains only one species, the osprey. The osprey is a medium-large raptor which is a specialist fish-eater with a worldwide distribution.

- Osprey, Pandion haliaetus

== Hawks, eagles, and kites ==
Order: Accipitriformes Family: Accipitridae

Accipitridae is a family of birds of prey, which includes hawks, eagles, kites, harriers and Old World vultures. These birds have powerful hooked beaks for tearing flesh from their prey, strong legs, powerful talons and keen eyesight.

- Black-winged kite, Elanus caeruleus
- Oriental honey-buzzard, Pernis ptilorhynchus
- Jerdon's baza, Aviceda jerdoni
- Black baza, Aviceda leuphotes
- Red-headed vulture, Sarcogyps calvus (Ex)
- Cinereous vulture, Aegypius monachus (A)
- White-rumped vulture, Gyps bengalensis (Ex)
- Slender-billed vulture, Gyps tenuirostris (Ex)
- Himalayan griffon, Gyps himalayensis (A)
- Mountain serpent-eagle, Spilornis kinabaluensis
- Crested serpent-eagle, Spilornis cheela
- Short-toed snake-eagle, Circaetus gallicus (A)
- Bat hawk, Macheiramphus alcinus
- Changeable hawk-eagle, Nisaetus cirrhatus
- Mountain hawk-eagle, Nisaetus nipalensis
- Blyth's hawk-eagle, Nisaetus alboniger
- Wallace's hawk-eagle, Nisaetus nanus
- Rufous-bellied eagle, Lophotriorchis kienerii
- Black eagle, Ictinaetus malaiensis
- Greater spotted eagle, Clanga clanga
- Booted eagle, Hieraaetus pennatus
- Steppe eagle, Aquila nipalensis
- Imperial eagle, Aquila heliaca
- Gray-faced buzzard, Butastur indicus
- Eurasian marsh-harrier, Circus aeruginosus (A)
- Eastern marsh-harrier, Circus spilonotus
- Hen harrier, Circus cyaneus (A)
- Pied harrier, Circus melanoleucos
- Crested goshawk, Accipiter trivirgatus
- Shikra, Accipiter badius
- Chinese sparrowhawk, Accipiter soloensis
- Japanese sparrowhawk, Accipiter gularis
- Besra, Accipiter virgatus
- Eurasian sparrowhawk, Accipiter nisus (A)
- Black kite, Milvus migrans
- Brahminy kite, Haliastur indus
- White-bellied sea-eagle, Haliaeetus leucogaster
- Lesser fish-eagle, Haliaeetus humilis
- Gray-headed fish-eagle, Haliaeetus ichthyaetus
- Common buzzard, Buteo buteo
- Himalayan buzzard, Buteo refectus
- Eastern buzzard, Buteo japonicus
- Long-legged buzzard, Buteo rufinus (A)

== Barn owls ==
Order: Strigiformes Family: Tytonidae

Barn owls are medium to large owls with large heads and characteristic heart-shaped faces. They have long strong legs with powerful talons.

- Australasian grass-owl, Tyto longimembris
- Eastern barn owl, Tyto javanica
- Oriental bay owl, Phodilus badius

== Owls ==
Order: Strigiformes Family: Strigidae

The typical owls are small to large solitary nocturnal birds of prey. They have large forward-facing eyes and ears, a hawk-like beak and a conspicuous circle of feathers around each eye called a facial disk.

- White-fronted scops-owl, Otus sagittatus
- Reddish scops-owl, Otus rufescens
- Mountain scops-owl, Otus spilocephalus
- Rajah scops-owl, Otus brookii
- Collared scops-owl, Otus lettia
- Sunda scops-owl, Otus lempiji
- Mantanani scops-owl, Otus mantananensis
- Oriental scops-owl, Otus sunia
- Barred eagle-owl, Bubo sumatranus
- Dusky eagle-owl, Bubo coromandus
- Brown fish-owl, Ketupa zeylonensis
- Buffy fish-owl, Ketupa ketupu
- Collared owlet, Taenioptynx brodiei
- Spotted wood-owl, Strix seloputo
- Brown wood-owl, Strix leptogrammica
- Short-eared owl, Asio flammeus (A)
- Brown boobook, Ninox scutulata
- Northern boobook, Ninox japonica

== Trogons ==
Order: Trogoniformes Family: Trogonidae

The family Trogonidae includes trogons and quetzals. Found in tropical woodlands worldwide, they feed on insects and fruit, and their broad bills and weak legs reflect their diet and arboreal habits. Although their flight is fast, they are reluctant to fly any distance. Trogons have soft, often colourful, feathers with distinctive male and female plumage.

- Red-naped trogon, Harpactes kasumba
- Diard's trogon, Harpactes diardii
- Whitehead's trogon, Harpactes whiteheadi
- Cinnamon-rumped trogon, Harpactes orrhophaeus
- Scarlet-rumped trogon, Harpactes duvaucelii
- Red-headed trogon, Harpactes erythrocephalus
- Orange-breasted trogon, Harpactes oreskios

== Hoopoes ==
Order: Bucerotiformes Family: Upupidae

Hoopoes have black, white and orangey-pink colouring with a large erectile crest on their head.

- Eurasian hoopoe, Upupa epops

== Hornbills ==
Order: Bucerotiformes Family: Bucerotidae

Hornbills are a group of birds whose bill is shaped like a cow's horn, but without a twist, sometimes with a casque on the upper mandible. Frequently, the bill is brightly coloured.

- White-crowned hornbill, Berenicornis comatus
- Helmeted hornbill, Buceros vigil
- Rhinoceros hornbill, Buceros rhinoceros
- Great hornbill, Buceros bicornis
- Bushy-crested hornbill, Anorrhinus galeritus
- Black hornbill, Anthracoceros malayanus
- Oriental pied-hornbill, Anthracoceros albirostris
- Wreathed hornbill, Rhyticeros undulatus
- Plain-pouched hornbill, Rhyticeros subruficollis
- Wrinkled hornbill, Rhabdotorrhinus corrugatus

== Kingfishers ==
Order: Coraciiformes Family: Alcedinidae

Kingfishers are medium-sized birds with large heads, long, pointed bills, short legs and stubby tails.

- Common kingfisher, Alcedo atthis
- Blue-eared kingfisher, Alcedo meninting
- Malaysian blue-banded kingfisher, Alcedo peninsulae
- Black-backed dwarf-kingfisher, Ceyx erithacus
- Rufous-backed dwarf-kingfisher, Ceyx rufidorsa
- Banded kingfisher, Lacedo pulchella
- Brown-winged kingfisher, Pelargopsis amauropterus
- Stork-billed kingfisher, Pelargopsis capensis
- Ruddy kingfisher, Halcyon coromanda
- White-throated kingfisher, Halcyon smyrnensis
- Black-capped kingfisher, Halcyon pileata
- Sacred kingfisher, Todirhamphus sanctus (A)
- Collared kingfisher, Todirhamphus chloris
- Rufous-collared kingfisher, Actenoides concretus
- Pied kingfisher, Ceryle rudis (A)

== Bee-eaters ==
Order: Coraciiformes Family: Meropidae

The bee-eaters are a group of near passerine birds in the family Meropidae. Most species are found in Africa but others occur in southern Europe, Madagascar, Australia and New Guinea. They are characterised by richly coloured plumage, slender bodies and usually elongated central tail feathers. All are colourful and have long downturned bills and pointed wings, which give them a swallow-like appearance when seen from afar.

- Red-bearded bee-eater, Nyctyornis amictus
- Asian green bee-eater, Merops orientalis (A)
- Blue-throated bee-eater, Merops viridis
- Blue-tailed bee-eater, Merops philippinus
- Rainbow bee-eater, Merops ornatus (A)
- Chestnut-headed bee-eater, Merops leschenaulti

== Rollers ==
Order: Coraciiformes Family: Coraciidae

Rollers resemble crows in size and build, but are more closely related to the kingfishers and bee-eaters. They share the colourful appearance of those groups with blues and browns predominating. The two inner front toes are connected, but the outer toe is not.

- Indochinese roller, Coracias affinis
- Dollarbird, Eurystomus orientalis

== Asian barbets ==
Order: Piciformes Family: Megalaimidae

The Asian barbets are plump birds, with short necks and large heads. They get their name from the bristles which fringe their heavy bills. Most species are brightly coloured.

- Sooty barbet, Caloramphus hayii
- Brown barbet, Caloramphus fuliginosus
- Coppersmith barbet, Psilopogon haemacephalus
- Blue-eared barbet, Psilopogon duvaucelii
- Bornean barbet, Psilopogon eximus
- Fire-tufted barbet, Psilopogon pyrolophus
- Red-crowned barbet, Psilopogon rafflesii
- Red-throated barbet, Psilopogon mystacophanos
- Golden-naped barbet, Psilopogon pulcherrimus
- Yellow-crowned barbet, Psilopogon henricii
- Lineated barbet, Psilopogon lineatus
- Golden-throated barbet, Psilopogon franklinii
- Mountain barbet, Psilopogon monticola
- Gold-whiskered barbet, Psilopogon chrysopogon
- Black-browed barbet, Psilopogon oorti

== Honeyguides ==
Order: Piciformes Family: Indicatoridae

Honeyguides are among the few birds that feed on wax. They are named for the greater honeyguide which leads traditional honey-hunters to bees' nests and, after the hunters have harvested the honey, feeds on the remaining contents of the hive.

- Malaysian honeyguide, Indicator archipelagicus

== Woodpeckers ==
Order: Piciformes Family: Picidae

Woodpeckers are small to medium-sized birds with chisel-like beaks, short legs, stiff tails and long tongues used for capturing insects. Some species have feet with two toes pointing forward and two backward, while several species have only three toes. Many woodpeckers have the habit of tapping noisily on tree trunks with their beaks.

- Eurasian wryneck, Jynx torquilla (A)
- Speckled piculet, Picumnus innominatus
- Rufous piculet, Sasia abnormis
- Gray-and-buff woodpecker, Hemicircus concretus
- Sunda pygmy woodpecker, Yungipicus moluccensis
- Gray-capped pygmy woodpecker, Yungipicus canicapillus
- Maroon woodpecker, Blythipicus rubiginosus
- Bay woodpecker, Blythipicus pyrrhotis
- Orange-backed woodpecker, Reinwardtipicus validus
- Greater flameback, Chrysocolaptes guttacristatus
- Rufous woodpecker, Micropternus brachyurus
- Buff-necked woodpecker, Meiglyptes tukki
- Buff-rumped woodpecker, Meiglyptes tristis
- Bamboo woodpecker, Gecinulus viridis
- Olive-backed woodpecker, Dinopium rafflesii
- Common flameback, Dinopium javanense
- Lesser yellownape, Picus chlorolophus
- Crimson-winged woodpecker, Picus puniceus
- Streak-breasted woodpecker, Picus viridanus
- Laced woodpecker, Picus vittatus
- Gray-headed woodpecker, Picus canus
- Banded woodpecker, Chrysophlegma mineaceum
- Greater yellownape, Chrysophlegma flavinucha
- Checker-throated woodpecker, Chrysophlegma mentale
- Great slaty woodpecker, Mulleripicus pulverulentus
- White-bellied woodpecker, Dryocopus javensis

== Falcons and caracaras ==
Order: Falconiformes Family: Falconidae

Falconidae is a family of diurnal birds of prey. They differ from hawks, eagles and kites in that they kill with their beaks instead of their talons. There are 62 species worldwide and 6 species which occur in Malaysia.

- Black-thighed falconet, Microhierax fringillarius
- White-fronted falconet, Microhierax latifrons
- Eurasian kestrel, Falco tinnunculus
- Amur falcon, Falco amurensis (A)
- Eurasian hobby, Falco subbuteo (A)
- Oriental hobby, Falco severus (A)
- Peregrine falcon, Falco peregrinus

== Old world parrots ==
Order: Psittaciformes Family: Psittaculidae

Characteristic features of parrots include a strong curved bill, an upright stance, strong legs, and clawed zygodactyl feet. Many parrots are vividly coloured, and some are multi-coloured. In size they range from 8 cm (3.1 in) to 1 m (3.3 ft) in length. Old World parrots are found from Africa east across south and southeast Asia and Oceania to Australia and New Zealand.

- Blue-rumped parrot, Psittinus cyanurus
- Rose-ringed parakeet, Psittacula krameri (I)
- Red-breasted parakeet, Psittacula alexandri (I)
- Long-tailed parakeet, Psittacula longicauda
- Blue-naped parrot, Tanygnathus lucionensis
- Blue-crowned hanging-parrot, Loriculus galgulus

== African and green broadbills ==
Order: Passeriformes Family: Calyptomenidae

The broadbills are small, brightly coloured birds which feed on fruit and also take insects in flycatcher fashion, snapping their broad bills. Their habitat is canopies of wet forests.

- Green broadbill, Calyptomena viridis
- Hose's broadbill, Calyptomena hosii
- Whitehead's broadbill, Calyptomena whiteheadi

== Asian and Grauer's broadbills ==
Order: Passeriformes Family: Eurylaimidae

The broadbills are small, brightly coloured birds which feed on fruit and also take insects in flycatcher fashion, snapping their broad bills. Their habitat is canopies of wet forests.

- Black-and-red broadbill, Cymbirhynchus macrorhynchos
- Long-tailed broadbill, Psarisomus dalhousiae
- Silver-breasted broadbill, Serilophus lunatus
- Banded broadbill, Eurylaimus javanicus
- Black-and-yellow broadbill, Eurylaimus ochromalus
- Dusky broadbill, Corydon sumatranus

== Pittas ==
Order: Passeriformes Family: Pittidae

Pittas are medium-sized by passerine standards and are stocky, with fairly long, strong legs, short tails and stout bills. Many are brightly coloured. They spend the majority of their time on wet forest floors, eating snails, insects and similar invertebrates.

- Black-crowned pitta, Erythropitta ussheri (E)
- Blue-banded pitta, Erythropitta arquata
- Garnet pitta, Erythropitta granatina
- Rusty-naped pitta, Hydrornis oatesi
- Giant pitta, Hydrornis caerulea
- Malayan banded-pitta, Hydrornis irena
- Bornean banded-pitta, Hydrornis schwaneri
- Blue-headed pitta, Hydrornis baudii
- Blue-winged pitta, Pitta moluccensis
- Fairy pitta, Pitta nympha
- Hooded pitta, Pitta sordida
- Mangrove pitta, Pitta megarhyncha

== Thornbills and allies ==
Order: Passeriformes Family: Acanthizidae

Thornbills are small passerine birds, similar in habits to the tits.

- Golden-bellied gerygone, Gerygone sulphurea

== Cuckooshrikes ==
Order: Passeriformes Family: Campephagidae

The cuckooshrikes are small to medium-sized passerine birds. They are predominantly greyish with white and black, although some species are brightly coloured.

- Fiery minivet, Pericrocotus igneus
- Gray-chinned minivet, Pericrocotus solaris
- Scarlet minivet, Pericrocotus flammeus
- Ashy minivet, Pericrocotus divaricatus
- Brown-rumped minivet, Pericrocotus cantonensis (A)
- Rosy minivet, Pericrocotus roseus (A)
- Large cuckooshrike, Coracina macei
- Bar-bellied cuckooshrike, Coracina striata
- Sunda cuckooshrike, Coracina larvata
- Javan cuckooshrike, Coracina javensis
- Pied triller, Lalage nigra
- Lesser cuckooshrike, Lalage fimbriata

== Vireos, shrike-babblers, and erpornis ==
Order: Passeriformes Family: Vireonidae

Most of the members of this family are found in the New World. However, the shrike-babblers and erpornis, which only slightly resemble the "true" vireos and greenlets, are found in South East Asia.

- White-browed shrike-babbler, Pteruthius flaviscapis
- Black-eared shrike-babbler, Pteruthius melanotis
- White-bellied erpornis, Erpornis zantholeuca

== Whistlers and allies ==
Order: Passeriformes Family: Pachycephalidae

The family Pachycephalidae includes the whistlers, shrikethrushes, and some of the pitohuis.

- Bornean whistler, Pachycephala hypoxantha
- Mangrove whistler, Pachycephala cinerea
- White-vented whistler, Pachycephala homeyeri

== Old World orioles ==
Order: Passeriformes Family: Oriolidae

The Old World orioles are colourful passerine birds. They are not related to the New World orioles.

- Dark-throated oriole, Oriolus xanthonotus
- Indian golden oriole, Oriolus kundoo (A)
- Black-naped oriole, Oriolus chinensis
- Black-hooded oriole, Oriolus xanthornus
- Black oriole, Oriolus hosii
- Black-and-crimson oriole, Oriolus cruentus

== Woodswallows, bellmagpies, and allies ==
Order: Passeriformes Family: Artamidae

The woodswallows are soft-plumaged, somber-coloured passerine birds. They are smooth, agile flyers with moderately large, semi-triangular wings.

- Ashy woodswallow, Artamus fuscus (A)
- White-breasted woodswallow, Artamus leucorynchus

== Vangas, helmetshrikes, and allies ==
Order: Passeriformes Family: Vangidae

The family Vangidae is highly variable, though most members of it resemble true shrikes to some degree.

- Large woodshrike, Tephrodornis gularis
- Bar-winged flycatcher-shrike, Hemipus picatus
- Black-winged flycatcher-shrike, Hemipus hirundinaceus
- Rufous-winged philentoma, Philentoma pyrhopterum
- Maroon-breasted philentoma, Philentoma velatum

== Bristlehead ==
Order: Passeriformes Family: Pityriasidae

The Bornean bristlehead is large black bird with a red and yellow head. Females also have some red in the wings. It has a massive heavy black hooked bill and a short tail. The crown of the head has short, coloured projections like bare feather shaft, hence the name 'Bristlehead'.

- Bornean bristlehead, Pityriasis gymnocephala

== Ioras ==
Order: Passeriformes Family: Aegithinidae

The ioras are bulbul-like birds of open forest or thorn scrub, but whereas that group tends to be drab in colouration, ioras are sexually dimorphic, with the males being brightly plumaged in yellows and greens.

- Common iora, Aegithina tiphia
- Green iora, Aegithina viridissima
- Great iora, Aegithina lafresnayei

== Fantails ==
Order: Passeriformes Family: Rhipiduridae

The fantails are small insectivorous birds which are specialist aerial feeders.

- Spotted fantail, Rhipidura perlata
- Willie-wagtail, Rhipidura leucophrys (A)
- Malaysian pied-fantail, Rhipidura javanica
- White-throated fantail, Rhipidura albicollis

== Drongos ==
Order: Passeriformes Family: Dicruridae

The drongos are mostly black or dark grey in colour, sometimes with metallic tints. They have long forked tails, and some Asian species have elaborate tail decorations. They have short legs and sit very upright when perched, like a shrike. They flycatch or take prey from the ground.

- Black drongo, Dicrurus macrocercus
- Ashy drongo, Dicrurus leucophaeus
- Crow-billed drongo, Dicrurus annectens
- Bronzed drongo, Dicrurus aeneus
- Lesser racket-tailed drongo, Dicrurus remifer
- Hair-crested drongo, Dicrurus hottentottus
- Greater racket-tailed drongo, Dicrurus paradiseus

== Monarch flycatchers ==
Order: Passeriformes Family: Monarchidae

The monarch flycatchers are small to medium-sized insectivorous passerines which hunt by flycatching.

- Black-naped monarch, Hypothymis azurea
- Japanese paradise-flycatcher, Terpsiphone atrocaudata
- Amur paradise-flycatcher, Terpsiphone incei
- Blyth's paradise-flycatcher, Terpsiphone affinis
- Indian paradise-flycatcher, Terpsiphone paradisi

== Crested shrikejay ==
Order: Passeriformes Family: Platylophidae

Until 2018 this species was included in family Corvidae, but genetic and morphological evidence place it in its own family.

- Crested shrikejay, Platylophus galericulatus

== Shrikes ==
Order: Passeriformes Family: Laniidae

Shrikes are passerine birds known for their habit of catching other birds and small animals and impaling the uneaten portions of their bodies on thorns. A typical shrike's beak is hooked, like a bird of prey.

- Tiger shrike, Lanius tigrinus
- Brown shrike, Lanius cristatus
- Long-tailed shrike, Lanius schach

== Crows, jays, and magpies ==
Order: Passeriformes Family: Corvidae

The family Corvidae includes crows, ravens, jays, choughs, magpies, treepies, nutcrackers and ground jays. Corvids are above average in size among the Passeriformes, and some of the larger species show high levels of intelligence.

- Black magpie, Platysmurus leucopterus
- Common green-magpie, Cissa chinensis
- Bornean green-magpie, Cissa jefferyi
- Bornean treepie, Dendrocitta cinerascens
- Racket-tailed treepie, Crypsirina temia
- House crow, Corvus splendens (I)
- Slender-billed crow, Corvus enca
- Large-billed crow, Corvus macrorhynchos

== Rail-babbler ==
Order: Passeriformes Family: Eupetidae

Eupetidae is a monotypic family; its sole species occurs in Malaysia.

- Malaysian rail-babbler, Eupetes macrocerus

== Fairy flycatchers ==
Order: Passeriformes Family: Stenostiridae

Most of the species of this small family are found in Africa, though a few inhabit tropical Asia. They are not closely related to other birds called "flycatchers".

- Gray-headed canary-flycatcher, Culicicapa ceylonensis

== Tits, chickadees, and titmice ==
Order: Passeriformes Family: Paridae

The Paridae are mainly small stocky woodland species with short stout bills. Some have crests. They are adaptable birds, with a mixed diet including seeds and insects.

- Sultan tit, Melanochlora sultanea
- Cinereous tit, Parus cinereus

== Larks ==
Order: Passeriformes Family: Alaudidae

Larks are small terrestrial birds with often extravagant songs and display flights. Most larks are fairly dull in appearance. Their food is insects and seeds.

- Eurasian skylark, Alauda arvensis (A)
- Oriental skylark, Alauda gulgula (A)

== Cisticolas and allies ==
Order: Passeriformes Family: Cisticolidae

The Cisticolidae are warblers found mainly in warmer southern regions of the Old World. They are generally very small birds of drab brown or grey appearance found in open country such as grassland or scrub.

- Common tailorbird, Orthotomus sutorius
- Dark-necked tailorbird, Orthotomus atrogularis
- Ashy tailorbird, Orthotomus ruficeps
- Rufous-tailed tailorbird, Orthotomus sericeus
- Hill prinia, Prinia superciliaris
- Rufescent prinia, Prinia rufescens
- Yellow-bellied prinia, Prinia flaviventris
- Plain prinia, Prinia inornata
- Zitting cisticola, Cisticola juncidis
- Golden-headed cisticola, Cisticola exilis

== Reed warblers and allies ==
Order: Passeriformes Family: Acrocephalidae

The members of this family are usually rather large for "warblers". Most are rather plain olivaceous brown above with much yellow to beige below. They are usually found in open woodland, reedbeds, or tall grass. The family occurs mostly in southern to western Eurasia and surroundings, but it also ranges far into the Pacific, with some species in Africa.

- Thick-billed warbler, Arundinax aedon (A)
- Booted warbler, Iduna caligata (A)
- Black-browed reed warbler, Acrocephalus bistrigiceps
- Manchurian reed warbler, Acrocephalus tangorum
- Oriental reed warbler, Acrocephalus orientalis
- Clamorous reed warbler, Acrocephalus stentoreus

== Grassbirds and allies ==
Order: Passeriformes Family: Locustellidae

Locustellidae are a family of small insectivorous songbirds found mainly in Eurasia, Africa, and the Australian region. They are smallish birds with tails that are usually long and pointed, and tend to be drab brownish or buffy all over.

- Striated grassbird, Megalurus palustris
- Pallas's grasshopper warbler, Helopsaltes certhiola
- Middendorff's grasshopper warbler, Helopsaltes ochotensis
- Lanceolated warbler, Locustella lanceolata
- Friendly bush warbler, Locustella accentor (E)

== Cupwings ==
Order: Passeriformes Family: Pnoepygidae

The members of this small family are found in mountainous parts of South and South East Asia.

- Pygmy cupwing, Pnoepyga pusilla

== Swallows ==
Order: Passeriformes Family: Hirundinidae

The family Hirundinidae is adapted to aerial feeding. They have a slender streamlined body, long pointed wings and a short bill with a wide gape. The feet are adapted to perching rather than walking, and the front toes are partially joined at the base.

- Bank swallow, Riparia riparia
- Dusky crag-martin, Ptyonoprogne concolor
- Barn swallow, Hirundo rustica
- Pacific swallow, Hirundo tahitica
- Red-rumped swallow, Cecropis daurica
- Striated swallow, Cecropis striolata
- Rufous-bellied swallow, Cecropis badia
- Asian house-martin, Delichon dasypus

== Bulbuls ==
Order: Passeriformes Family: Pycnonotidae

Bulbuls are medium-sized songbirds. Some are colourful with yellow, red or orange vents, cheeks, throats or supercilia, but most are drab, with uniform olive-brown to black plumage. Some species have distinct crests.

- Black-and-white bulbul, Brachypodius melanoleucus
- Puff-backed bulbul, Brachypodius eutilotus
- Black-headed bulbul, Brachypodius melanocephalos
- Spectacled bulbul, Rubigula erythropthalmos
- Gray-bellied bulbul, Rubigula cyaniventris
- Scaly-breasted bulbul, Rubigula squamatus
- Black-crested bulbul, Rubigula flaviventris
- Bornean bulbul, Rubigula montis
- Straw-headed bulbul, Pycnonotus zeylanicus
- Red-whiskered bulbul, Pycnonotus jocosus
- Sooty-headed bulbul, Pycnonotus aurigaster (I)
- Blue-wattled bulbul, Pycnonotus nieuwenhuisii
- Stripe-throated bulbul, Pycnonotus finlaysoni
- Flavescent bulbul, Pycnonotus flavescens
- Yellow-vented bulbul, Pycnonotus goiavier
- Olive-winged bulbul, Pycnonotus plumosus
- Cream-eyed bulbul, Pycnonotus pseudosimplex
- Streak-eared bulbul, Pycnonotus conradi
- Cream-vented bulbul, Pycnonotus simplex
- Red-eyed bulbul, Pycnonotus brunneus
- Hairy-backed bulbul, Tricholestes criniger
- Hook-billed bulbul, Setornis criniger
- Finsch's bulbul, Alophoixus finschii
- Penan bulbul, Alophoixus ruficrissus
- Ochraceous bulbul, Alophoixus ochraceus
- Gray-cheeked bulbul, Alophoixus tephrogenys
- Yellow-bellied bulbul, Alophoixus phaeocephalus
- Buff-vented bulbul, Iole crypta
- Charlotte's bulbul, Iole charlottae
- Olive bulbul, Iole viridescens (A)
- Cinereous bulbul, Hemixos cinereus
- Mountain bulbul, Ixos mcclellandii
- Streaked bulbul, Ixos malaccensis

== Leaf warblers ==
Order: Passeriformes Family: Phylloscopidae

Leaf warblers are a family of small insectivorous birds found mostly in Eurasia and ranging into Wallacea and Africa. The species are of various sizes, often green-plumaged above and yellow below, or more subdued with greyish-green to greyish-brown colours.

- Yellow-browed warbler, Phylloscopus inornatus
- Radde's warbler, Phylloscopus schwarzi (A)
- Dusky warbler, Phylloscopus fuscatus
- Willow warbler, Phylloscopus trochilus (A)
- Eastern crowned warbler, Phylloscopus coronatus
- Alström's warbler, Phylloscopus soror (A)
- Two-barred warbler, Phylloscopus plumbeitarsus (A)
- Pale-legged leaf warbler, Phylloscopus tenellipes (A)
- Sakhalin leaf warbler, Phylloscopus borealoides
- Japanese leaf warbler, Phylloscopus xanthodryas
- Arctic warbler, Phylloscopus borealis
- Kamchatka leaf warbler, Phylloscopus examinandus
- Chestnut-crowned warbler, Phylloscopus castaniceps
- Yellow-breasted warbler, Phylloscopus montis
- Mountain leaf warbler, Phylloscopus trivirgatus

== Bush warblers and allies ==
Order: Passeriformes Family: Scotocercidae

The members of this family are found throughout Africa, Asia, and Polynesia. Their taxonomy is in flux, and some authorities place some genera in other families.

- Bornean stubtail, Urosphena whiteheadi (E)
- Yellow-bellied warbler, Abroscopus superciliaris
- Mountain tailorbird, Phyllergates cuculatus
- Manchurian bush warbler, Horornis canturians (A)
- Aberrant bush warbler, Horornis flavolivaceus

== White-eyes, yuhinas, and allies ==
Order: Passeriformes Family: Zosteropidae

The white-eyes are small and mostly undistinguished, their plumage above being generally some dull colour like greenish-olive, but some species have a white or bright yellow throat, breast or lower parts, and several have buff flanks. As their name suggests, many species have a white ring around each eye.

- Chestnut-crested yuhina, Staphida everetti
- Pygmy white-eye, Heleia squamifrons (E)
- Hume's white-eye, Zosterops auriventer
- Swinhoe's white-eye, Zosterops simplex
- Black-capped white-eye, Zosterops atricapillus
- Javan white-eye, Zosterops flavus (A)
- Mountain black-eye, Zosterops emiliae

== Tree-babblers, scimitar-babblers, and allies ==
Order: Passeriformes Family: Timaliidae

The babblers, or timaliids, are somewhat diverse in size and colouration, but are characterised by soft fluffy plumage.

- Pin-striped tit-babbler, Mixornis gularis
- Bold-striped tit-babbler, Mixornis bornensis
- Fluffy-backed tit-babbler, Macronus ptilosus
- Golden babbler, Cyanoderma chrysaeum
- Chestnut-winged babbler, Cyanoderma erythropterum
- Gray-hooded babbler, Cyanoderma bicolor
- Rufous-fronted babbler, Cyanoderma rufifrons
- Sunda scimitar-babbler, Pomatorhinus bornensis
- Large scimitar-babbler, Erythrogenys hypoleucos
- Black-throated babbler, Stachyris nigricollis
- Chestnut-rumped babbler, Stachyris maculata
- Gray-throated babbler, Stachyris nigriceps
- Gray-headed babbler, Stachyris poliocephala
- White-necked babbler, Stachyris leucotis

== Ground babblers and allies ==
Order: Passeriformes Family: Pellorneidae

These small to medium-sized songbirds have soft fluffy plumage but are otherwise rather diverse. Members of the genus Illadopsis are found in forests, but some other genera are birds of scrublands.

- Moustached babbler, Malacopteron magnirostre
- Sooty-capped babbler, Malacopteron affine
- Scaly-crowned babbler, Malacopteron cinereum
- Rufous-crowned babbler, Malacopteron magnum
- Gray-breasted babbler, Malacopteron albogulare
- Collared babbler, Gampsorhynchus torquatus
- Rufous-winged fulvetta, Schoeniparus castaneceps
- Puff-throated babbler, Pellorneum ruficeps
- Black-capped babbler, Pellorneum capistratum
- Buff-breasted babbler, Pellorneum tickelli
- Temminck's babbler, Pellorneum pyrrogenys
- Short-tailed babbler, Pellorneum malaccense
- White-chested babbler, Pellorneum rostratum
- Ferruginous babbler, Pellorneum bicolor
- Striped wren-babbler, Kenopia striata
- Eyebrowed wren-babbler, Napothera epilepidota
- Bornean wren-babbler, Ptilocichla leucogrammica
- Abbott's babbler, Malacocincla abbotti
- Horsfield's babbler, Malacocincla sepiaria
- Large wren-babbler, Turdinus macrodactylus
- Black-throated wren-babbler, Turdinus atrigularis
- Marbled wren-babbler, Turdinus marmoratus
- Streaked wren-babbler, Gypsophila brevicaudata
- Mountain wren-babbler, Gypsophila crassa (E)

== Laughingthrushes and allies ==
Order: Passeriformes Family: Leiothrichidae

The members of this family are diverse in size and colouration, though those of genus Turdoides tend to be brown or greyish. The family is found in Africa, India, and southeast Asia.

- Brown fulvetta, Alcippe brunneicauda
- Mountain fulvetta, Alcippe peracensis
- Himalayan cutia, Cutia nipalensis
- Sunda laughingthrush, Garrulax palliatus
- White-crested laughingthrush, Garrulax leucolophus (I)
- Black laughingthrush, Melanocichla lugubris
- Bare-headed laughingthrush, Melanocichla calvus
- Chestnut-capped laughingthrush, Pterorhinus mitratus
- Chestnut-hooded laughingthrush, Pterorhinus treacheri
- Malayan laughingthrush, Trochalopteron peninsulae
- Long-tailed sibia, Heterophasia picaoides
- Silver-eared mesia, Leiothrix argentauris
- Blue-winged minla, Minla cyanouroptera
- Chestnut-tailed minla, Minla strigula

== Nuthatches ==
Order: Passeriformes Family: Sittidae

Nuthatches are small woodland birds. They have the unusual ability to climb down trees head first, unlike other birds which can only go upwards. Nuthatches have big heads, short tails and powerful bills and feet.

- Velvet-fronted nuthatch, Sitta frontalis
- Blue nuthatch, Sitta azurea

== Starlings ==
Order: Passeriformes Family: Sturnidae

Starlings are small to medium-sized passerine birds. Their flight is strong and direct and they are very gregarious. Their preferred habitat is fairly open country. They eat insects and fruit. Plumage is typically dark with a metallic sheen.

- Asian glossy starling, Aplonis panayensis
- Sulawesi myna, Basilornis celebensis (I)
- Golden-crested myna, Ampeliceps coronatus (Ex)
- Common hill myna, Gracula religiosa
- European starling, Sturnus vulgaris (A)
- Rosy starling, Pastor roseus
- Daurian starling, Agropsar sturnina
- Chestnut-cheeked starling, Agropsar philippensis
- Black-collared starling, Gracupica nigricollis (I)
- Indian pied starling, Gracupica contra; (A)
- Siamese pied starling, Gracupica floweri; (A)
- White-shouldered starling, Sturnia sinensis
- Brahminy starling, Sturnia pagodarum (A)
- Common myna, Acridotheres tristis
- Jungle myna, Acridotheres fuscus
- Javan myna, Acridotheres javanicus (I)
- Pale-bellied myna, Acridotheres cinereus (I)
- Great myna, Acridotheres grandis (I)
- Crested myna, Acridotheres cristatellus (I)

== Thrushes and allies ==
Order: Passeriformes Family: Turdidae

The thrushes are a group of passerine birds that occur mainly in the Old World. They are plump, soft plumaged, small to medium-sized insectivores or sometimes omnivores, often feeding on the ground. Many have attractive songs.

- Everett's thrush, Zoothera everetti (E)
- White's thrush, Zoothera aurea
- Scaly thrush, Zoothera dauma (A)
- Fruit-hunter, Chlamydochaera jefferyi (E)
- Siberian thrush, Geokichla sibirica
- Chestnut-capped thrush, Geokichla interpres
- Orange-headed thrush, Geokichla citrina
- Japanese thrush, Turdus cardis (A)
- Gray-sided thrush, Turdus feae (A)
- Eyebrowed thrush, Turdus obscurus
- Tasman Sea island thrush, Turdus poliocephalus
- Red-throated thrush, Turdus ruficollis (A)

== Old World flycatchers ==
Order: Passeriformes Family: Muscicapidae

Old World flycatchers are a large group of small passerine birds native to the Old World. They are mainly small arboreal insectivores. The appearance of these birds is highly varied, but they mostly have weak songs and harsh calls.

- Gray-streaked flycatcher, Muscicapa griseisticta
- Dark-sided flycatcher, Muscicapa sibirica
- Ferruginous flycatcher, Muscicapa ferruginea
- Asian brown flycatcher, Muscicapa dauurica
- Brown-streaked flycatcher, Muscicapa williamsoni
- Oriental magpie-robin, Copsychus saularis
- Rufous-tailed shama, Copsychus pyrropygus
- White-rumped shama, Copsychus malabaricus
- White-crowned shama, Copsychus stricklandii
- Rufous-browed flycatcher, Anthipes solitaris
- White-tailed flycatcher, Cyornis concretus
- Pale blue flycatcher, Cyornis unicolor
- Chinese blue flycatcher, Cyornis glaucicomans
- Large blue flycatcher, Cyornis magnirostris
- Hill blue flycatcher, Cyornis whitei
- Dayak blue flycatcher, Cyornis montanus
- Sunda blue flycatcher, Cyornis caerulatus
- Malaysian blue flycatcher, Cyornis turcosus
- Bornean blue flycatcher, Cyornis superbus
- Indochinese blue flycatcher, Cyornis sumatrensis
- Mangrove blue flycatcher, Cyornis rufigastra
- Brown-chested jungle-flycatcher, Cyornis brunneatus
- Gray-chested jungle-flycatcher, Cyornis umbratilis
- Fulvous-chested jungle-flycatcher, Cyornis olivaceus
- Chestnut-tailed jungle-flycatcher, Cyornis ruficauda
- Large niltava, Niltava grandis
- Rufous-vented niltava, Niltava sumatrana
- Blue-and-white flycatcher, Cyanoptila cyanomelana
- Zappey's flycatcher, Cyanoptila cumatilis
- Indigo flycatcher, Eumyias indigo
- Verditer flycatcher, Eumyias thalassina
- Eyebrowed jungle-flycatcher, Vauriella gularis (E)
- Lesser shortwing, Brachypteryx leucophrys
- Bornean shortwing, Brachypteryx erythrogyna
- Rufous-headed robin, Larvivora ruficeps (A)
- Siberian blue robin, Larvivora cyane
- Bluethroat, Luscinia svecica (A)
- Bornean whistling-thrush, Myophonus borneensis
- Malayan whistling-thrush, Myophonus robinsoni (E)
- Blue whistling-thrush, Myophonus caeruleus
- White-crowned forktail, Enicurus leschenaulti
- Bornean forktail, Enicurus borneensis
- Chestnut-naped forktail, Enicurus ruficapillus
- Slaty-backed forktail, Enicurus schistaceus
- Siberian rubythroat, Calliope calliope (A)
- White-tailed robin, Myiomela leucura
- Himalayan bluetail, Tarsiger rufilatus (A)
- Yellow-rumped flycatcher, Ficedula zanthopygia
- Green-backed flycatcher, Ficedula elisae
- Narcissus flycatcher, Ficedula narcissina
- Mugimaki flycatcher, Ficedula mugimaki
- Snowy-browed flycatcher, Ficedula hyperythra
- Pygmy flycatcher, Ficedula hodgsoni
- Little pied flycatcher, Ficedula westermanni
- Taiga flycatcher, Ficedula albicilla
- Rufous-chested flycatcher, Ficedula dumetoria
- Daurian redstart, Phoenicurus auroreus (A)
- White-throated rock-thrush, Monticola gularis
- Blue rock-thrush, Monticola solitarius
- Siberian stonechat, Saxicola maurus
- Amur stonechat, Saxicola stejnegeri
- Pied bushchat, Saxicola caprata (A)
- Northern wheatear, Oenanthe oenanthe (A)

== Flowerpeckers ==
Order: Passeriformes Family: Dicaeidae

The flowerpeckers are very small, stout, often brightly coloured birds, with short tails, short thick curved bills and tubular tongues.

- Yellow-breasted flowerpecker, Prionochilus maculatus
- Crimson-breasted flowerpecker, Prionochilus percussus
- Yellow-rumped flowerpecker, Prionochilus xanthopygius
- Scarlet-breasted flowerpecker, Prionochilus thoracicus
- Spectacled flowerpecker, Dicaeum dayakorum
- Thick-billed flowerpecker, Dicaeum agile
- Brown-backed flowerpecker, Dicaeum everetti
- Yellow-vented flowerpecker, Dicaeum chrysorrheum
- Orange-bellied flowerpecker, Dicaeum trigonostigma
- Plain flowerpecker, Dicaeum minullum
- Fire-breasted flowerpecker, Dicaeum ignipectus
- Black-sided flowerpecker, Dicaeum monticolum
- Scarlet-backed flowerpecker, Dicaeum cruentatum

== Sunbirds and spiderhunters ==
Order: Passeriformes Family: Nectariniidae

The sunbirds and spiderhunters are very small passerine birds which feed largely on nectar, although they will also take insects, especially when feeding young. Flight is fast and direct on their short wings. Most species can take nectar by hovering like a hummingbird, but usually perch to feed.

- Ruby-cheeked sunbird, Chalcoparia singalensis
- Plain sunbird, Anthreptes simplex
- Brown-throated sunbird, Anthreptes malacensis
- Red-throated sunbird, Anthreptes rhodolaemus
- Van Hasselt's sunbird, Leptocoma brasiliana
- Purple-throated sunbird, Leptocoma sperata (A)
- Copper-throated sunbird, Leptocoma calcostetha
- Olive-backed sunbird, Cinnyris jugularis
- Black-throated sunbird, Aethopyga saturata
- Temminck's sunbird, Aethopyga temminckii
- Crimson sunbird, Aethopyga siparaja
- Purple-naped spiderhunter, Kurochkinegramma hypogrammicum
- Thick-billed spiderhunter, Arachnothera crassirostris
- Long-billed spiderhunter, Arachnothera robusta
- Little spiderhunter, Arachnothera longirostra
- Whitehead's spiderhunter, Arachnothera juliae
- Yellow-eared spiderhunter, Arachnothera chrysogenys
- Spectacled spiderhunter, Arachnothera flavigaster
- Streaked spiderhunter, Arachnothera magna
- Gray-breasted spiderhunter, Arachnothera modesta
- Bornean spiderhunter, Arachnothera everetti

== Fairy-bluebirds ==
Order: Passeriformes Family: Irenidae

The fairy-bluebirds are bulbul-like birds of open forest or thorn scrub. The males are dark-blue and the females a duller green.

- Asian fairy-bluebird, Irena puella

== Leafbirds ==
Order: Passeriformes Family: Chloropseidae

The leafbirds are small, bulbul-like birds. The males are brightly plumaged, usually in greens and yellows.

- Greater green leafbird, Chloropsis sonnerati
- Lesser green leafbird, Chloropsis cyanopogon
- Blue-winged leafbird, Chloropsis cochinchinensis
- Bornean leafbird, Chloropsis kinabaluensis
- Golden-fronted leafbird, Chloropsis aurifrons (I)
- Orange-bellied leafbird, Chloropsis hardwickii

== Weavers and allies ==
Order: Passeriformes Family: Ploceidae

The weavers are small passerine birds related to the finches. They are seed-eating birds with rounded conical bills. The males of many species are brightly coloured, usually in red or yellow and black, some species show variation in colour only in the breeding season.

- Baya weaver, Ploceus philippinus

== Waxbills and allies ==
Order: Passeriformes Family: Estrildidae

The estrildid finches are small passerine birds of the Old World tropics and Australasia. They are gregarious and often colonial seed eaters with short thick but pointed bills. They are all similar in structure and habits, but have wide variation in plumage colours and patterns.

- Red avadavat, Amandava amandava (I)
- Tawny-breasted parrotfinch, Erythrura hyperythra
- Pin-tailed parrotfinch, Erythrura prasina
- White-rumped munia, Lonchura striata
- Javan munia, Lonchura leucogastroides (I)
- Dusky munia, Lonchura fuscans
- Scaly-breasted munia, Lonchura punctulata
- White-bellied munia, Lonchura leucogastra
- Chestnut munia, Lonchura atricapilla
- White-headed munia, Lonchura maja
- Java sparrow, Padda oryzivora (I)

== Old World sparrows ==
Order: Passeriformes Family: Passeridae

Old World sparrows are small passerine birds. In general, sparrows tend to be small, plump, brown or grey birds with short tails and short powerful beaks. Sparrows are seed eaters, but they also consume small insects.

- House sparrow, Passer domesticus (A)
- Plain-backed sparrow, Passer flaveolus
- Eurasian tree sparrow, Passer montanus

== Wagtails and pipits ==
Order: Passeriformes Family: Motacillidae

Motacillidae is a family of small passerine birds with medium to long tails. They include the wagtails, longclaws and pipits. They are slender, ground feeding insectivores of open country.

- Forest wagtail, Dendronanthus indicus
- Gray wagtail, Motacilla cinerea
- Western yellow wagtail, Motacilla flava
- Eastern yellow wagtail, Motacilla tschutschensis
- Citrine wagtail, Motacilla citreola (A)
- White wagtail, Motacilla alba
- Richard's pipit, Anthus richardi (A)
- Paddyfield pipit, Anthus rufulus
- Blyth's pipit, Anthus godlewskii (A)
- Olive-backed pipit, Anthus hodgsoni
- Pechora pipit, Anthus gustavi
- Red-throated pipit, Anthus cervinus

== Finches, euphonias, and allies ==
Order: Passeriformes Family: Fringillidae

Finches are seed-eating passerine birds, that are small to moderately large and have a strong beak, usually conical and in some species very large. All have twelve tail feathers and nine primaries. These birds have a bouncing flight with alternating bouts of flapping and gliding on closed wings, and most sing well.

- Brown bullfinch, Pyrrhula nipalensis

== Old World buntings ==
Order: Passeriformes Family: Emberizidae

The emberizids are a large family of passerine birds. They are seed-eating birds with distinctively shaped bills. Many emberizid species have distinctive head patterns.

- Black-headed bunting, Emberiza melanocephala (A)
- Chestnut-eared bunting, Emberiza fucata (A)
- Yellow-breasted bunting, Emberiza aureola (A)
- Little bunting, Emberiza pusilla
- Chestnut bunting, Emberiza rutila (A)

== See also ==
- List of birds
- Lists of birds by region
