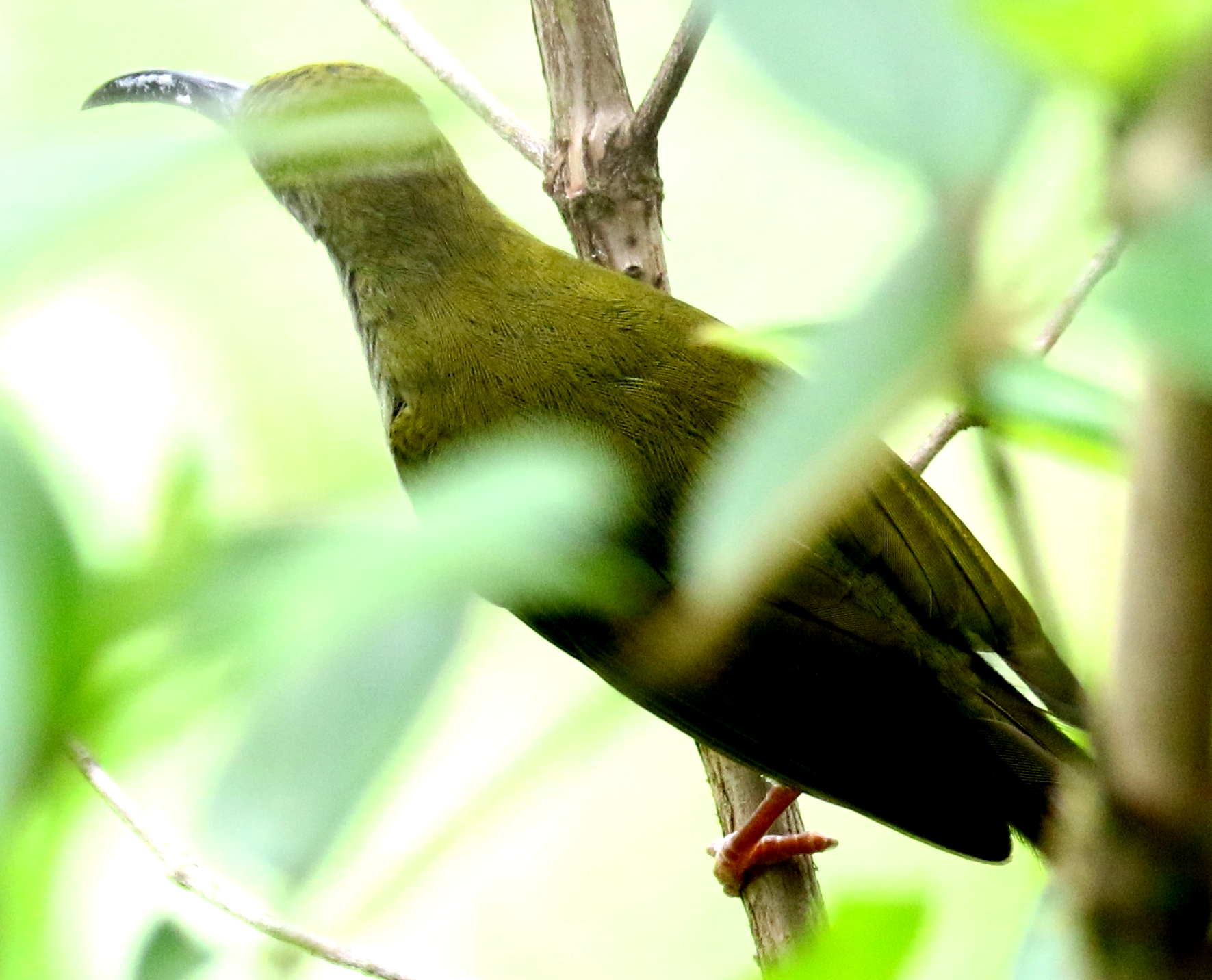
- In Sabah, Borneo

Scientific classification
- Kingdom: Animalia
- Phylum: Chordata
- Class: Aves
- Order: Passeriformes
- Family: Nectariniidae
- Genus: Arachnothera
- Species: A. everetti

Binomial name
- Arachnothera everetti (Sharpe, 1893)

= Bornean spiderhunter =

Species of bird

The Bornean spiderhunter (Arachnothera everetti) is a doubtful species of bird in the family Nectariniidae. The scientific name commemorates British colonial administrator and zoological collector Alfred Hart Everett.

== Distribution and habitat ==
It is endemic to the island of Borneo. Its natural habitats are subtropical or tropical moist lowland forests and subtropical or tropical moist montane forests.

== Taxonomy ==
The species is recognised by IOC, but not by BirdLife International. If not valid as a species, it may be considered as a subspecies of Arachnothera affinis or Arachnothera modesta.
