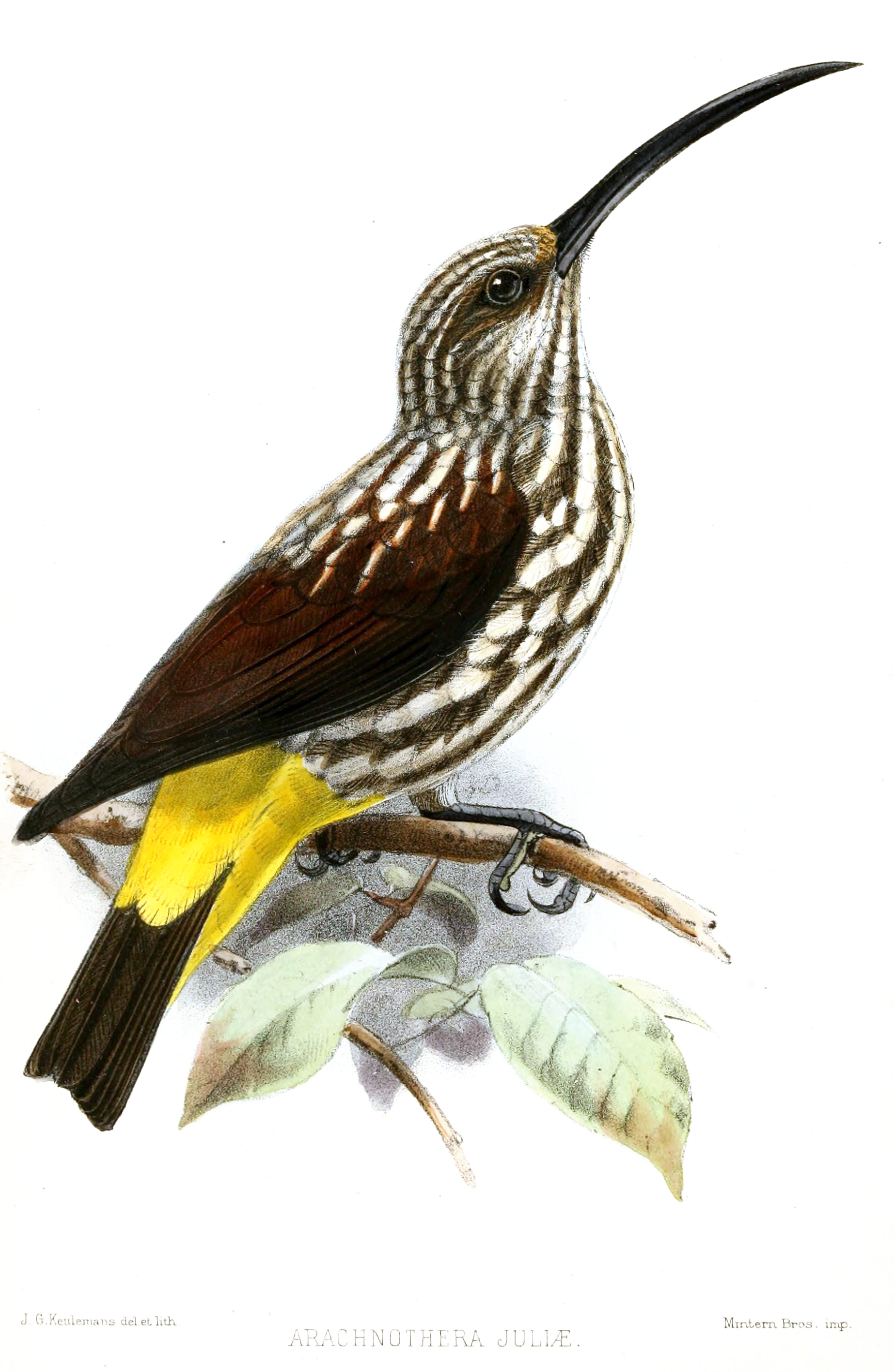
- Illustration of Whitehead's spiderhunter by John Gerrard Keulemans

Conservation status
- Least Concern (IUCN 3.1)

Scientific classification
- Kingdom: Animalia
- Phylum: Chordata
- Class: Aves
- Order: Passeriformes
- Family: Nectariniidae
- Genus: Arachnothera
- Species: A. juliae

Binomial name
- Arachnothera juliae Sharpe, 1887

= Whitehead's spiderhunter =

Species of bird endemic to Borneo

Whitehead's spiderhunter (Arachnothera juliae) is a species of spiderhunter in the sunbird and spiderhunter family Nectariniidae. It is endemic to Borneo, where it is found in the mountain ranges in the north-central part of the island. It inhabits hill dipterocarp forest, primary and secondary montane forest, and forest edge at elevations of 930–3,000 m (3,050–9,840 ft). A large and distinctive spiderhunter, the species is mostly brown with profuse whitish streaking all over the body and bright yellow vents and uppertail coverts. Both sexes are similar in appearance, but males are larger, with a length of 16.5–18 cm (6.5–7.1 in) compared to a length of 15.5–16.5 cm (6.1–6.5 in) for females. The juvenile plumage is unknown.

The species feeds on small arthropods, berries, and nectar, foraging alone, in pairs, or in small flocks of up to five birds. It breeds from March to at least August, making bark-lined nests in hollows it excavates in naturally occurring clumps of moss, vegetation, and roots. This nest is unique within its genus and is shared only with the closely related yellow-eared and naked-faced spiderhunters. Clutches consist of two chicks, which are fed berries and arthropods. It is listed as being of least concern by the International Union for Conservation of Nature, but is experiencing a population decline caused by habitat destruction.

== Taxonomy and systematics ==
In 1887, the British ornithologist Richard Bowdler Sharpe described Whitehead's spiderhunter as Arachnothera juliae on the basis of specimens collected from Mount Kinabalu, Borneo by the British explorer John Whitehead. The name of the genus is from the Ancient Greek arakhnēs, meaning spider, and thēras, meaning hunter. The specific name is in honour of Julia Charlotte Sophia, the wife of the Scottish ornithologist Arthur Hay. Whitehead's spiderhunter is the official common name designated by the International Ornithologists' Union and is in honour of Whitehead.

Whitehead's spiderhunter is one of 147 species in the sunbird and spiderhunter family Nectariniidae. Within the family, it is one of 13 species in the spiderhunter genus Arachnothera. A 2011 phylogenetic study by the ornithologist Robert Moyle and colleagues found Whitehead's spiderhunter to be most closely related to a clade (a group of all the descendants of a common ancestor) formed by the yellow-eared and naked-faced spiderhunters.

== Description ==
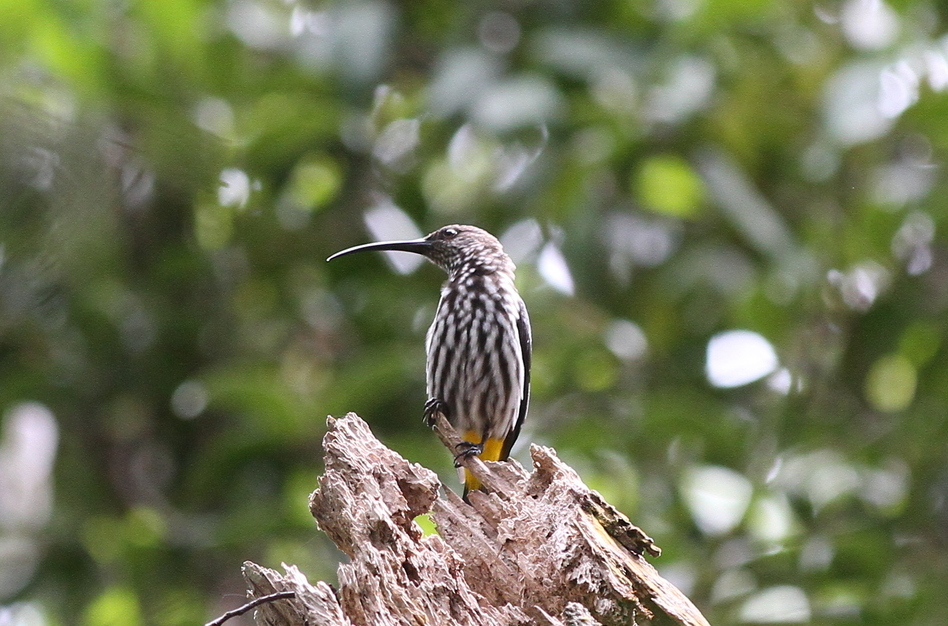
A Whitehead's spiderhunter in Kinabalu Park, Malaysia

The species is a large, distinctive spiderhunter, with males having a length of 16.5–18 cm (6.5–7.1 in) and females having a length of 15.5–16.5 cm (6.1–6.5 in). It is mainly brown with profuse streaking on the head and body, buffy white streaking on the top of the head, narrow white streaks on the neck and back, fine brownish-white streaking on the throat, and broad white streaking on the rest of the underparts. The vent and uppertail coverts are bright yellow. The iris is brown, while the legs and bill are black. Both sexes look similar, while the juvenile plumage is unknown.

Whitehead's spiderhunters have very distinctive vocalisations, with a high-pitched, squeaky song. Their calls include a wheezy wee-chit, with the first note rising and second note falling in pitch, a complex series of nasal and wheezy wit-wit-wit-wt'wt'wt'weehee twitters and trills, and a teeh-teeh-wee, with the wee rising in pitch. Other calls are a see-wee see-wee, a swee-eee-eee, a tee-tee-swee-ee, prolonged twittering, and loud shrieks made in flight or while perched.

== Distribution and habitat ==
Endemic to Borneo, Whitehead's spiderhunter is found in mountain ranges in the north-central part of the island, from Mount Kinabalu to the Dulit Range and Kayan Mentarang. It inhabits hill dipterocarp forest, primary and secondary montane forest, and forest edge at elevations of 930–3,000 m (3,050–9,840 ft).

== Behaviour and ecology ==
The species is relatively sedate and has a generation length of 4.2 years.

=== Feeding ===
Whitehead's spiderhunter feeds on small arthropods, berries, and nectar. It feeds alone, in pairs, or in groups of up to five birds, occasionally joining mixed-species foraging flocks. Foraging is usually conducted in the canopy, but the species will sometimes lower down at forest edges. It searches for food in foliage, particularly within clumps of epiphytes high up in the forest, and has been observed probing Rhododendron flowers.

=== Breeding ===
The breeding season of Whitehead's spiderhunters lasts from March to at least August and males with enlarged testes have been collected in June and November. The species' nests are bowls lined with fine, fibrous bark, made inside a hollow in naturally occurring clumps of moss, vegetation, and roots. The clumps are suspended at a height of 10–19 m (33–62 ft) from the ground and hollows are excavated by the spiderhunters by removing vegetation from the clumps. The nest bowls have a diameter of 7 cm (2.8 in) and a depth of 4 cm (1.6 in), while the entrance to the hollow has a diameter of 5 cm (2.0 in). Whitehead's spiderhunter's nest structure is unique within its genus and is only shared with the closely related yellow-eared and naked-faced spiderhunters; other spiderhunters usually make nests out of leaves, lined with fibrous material, entered through a narrow opening, and attached to the underside of banana leaves or palm fronds. Clutches consist of two chicks, which are fed berries and arthropods.

== Status ==
Whitehead's spiderhunter is listed as being of least concern by the International Union for Conservation of Nature due to its fairly large range, sufficiently large population, and a lack of significant population decline. It was previously considered near-threatened and its population is thought to currently be declining due to habitat destruction. It is present in some protected areas like Kinabalu Park and Rafflesia Forest Reserve.
