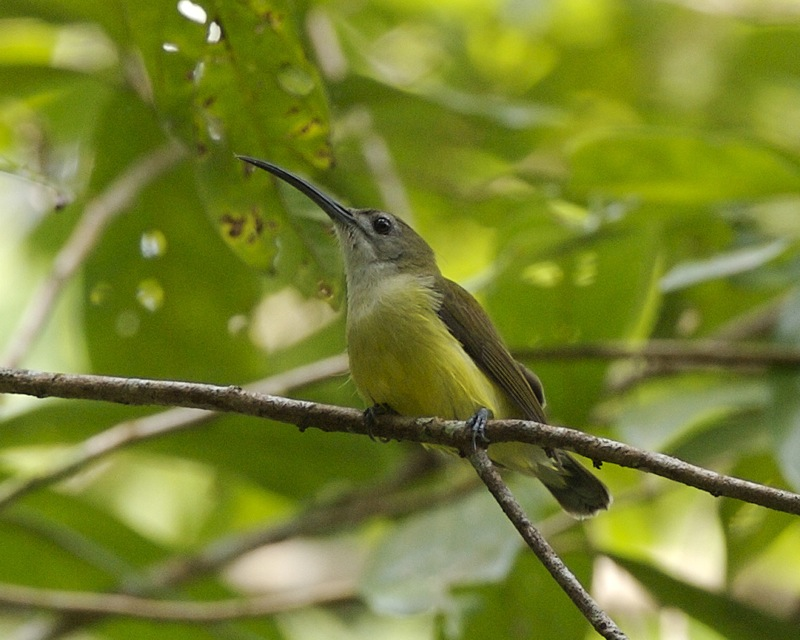
- Little spiderhunter Arachnothera longirostra

Scientific classification
- Kingdom: Animalia
- Phylum: Chordata
- Class: Aves
- Order: Passeriformes
- Family: Nectariniidae
- Genus: Arachnothera; Temminck, 1826

Type species
- Nectarinia chrysogenys Temminck, 1826

Species
- See text.

= Spiderhunter =

Spiderhunters

Genus of birds

The spiderhunters are birds of the genus Arachnothera, part of the sunbird family Nectariniidae. The genus contains thirteen species found in the forests of south and southeastern Asia. They are large representatives of the sunbird family, with drab plumage and long strongly curved bills. They feed on both nectar and a range of small arthropods.

== Taxonomy ==
The genus Arachnothera was introduced in 1826 by the Dutch zoologist Coenraad Jacob Temminck to accommondate a single species, Nectarinia chrysogenys Temminck, the yellow-eared spiderhunter, which is therefore considered to be the type species. The genus name combines the Ancient Greek αραχνης/arakhnēs meaning "spider" with -θηρας/-thēras meaning "hunter".

== Distribution and habitat ==
Unlike the rest of the family, which is more widespread, the spiderhunters are confined to the Oriental zoogeographic region, occurring from India east to the Philippines and from the Himalayas south to Java; they reach their greatest species diversity in the Thai-Malay peninsula, Sumatra and Borneo. The spiderhunters are mostly forest birds, occupying a wide range of forest types including true rainforest, dipterocarp forest, swamp forest, bamboo forest, secondary forest, forest edge and other highly degraded forest. In addition several species occur in human-created habitat such as gardens or plantations. Most species are lowland species, but the Whitehead's spiderhunter is more of a montane species.

== Description ==
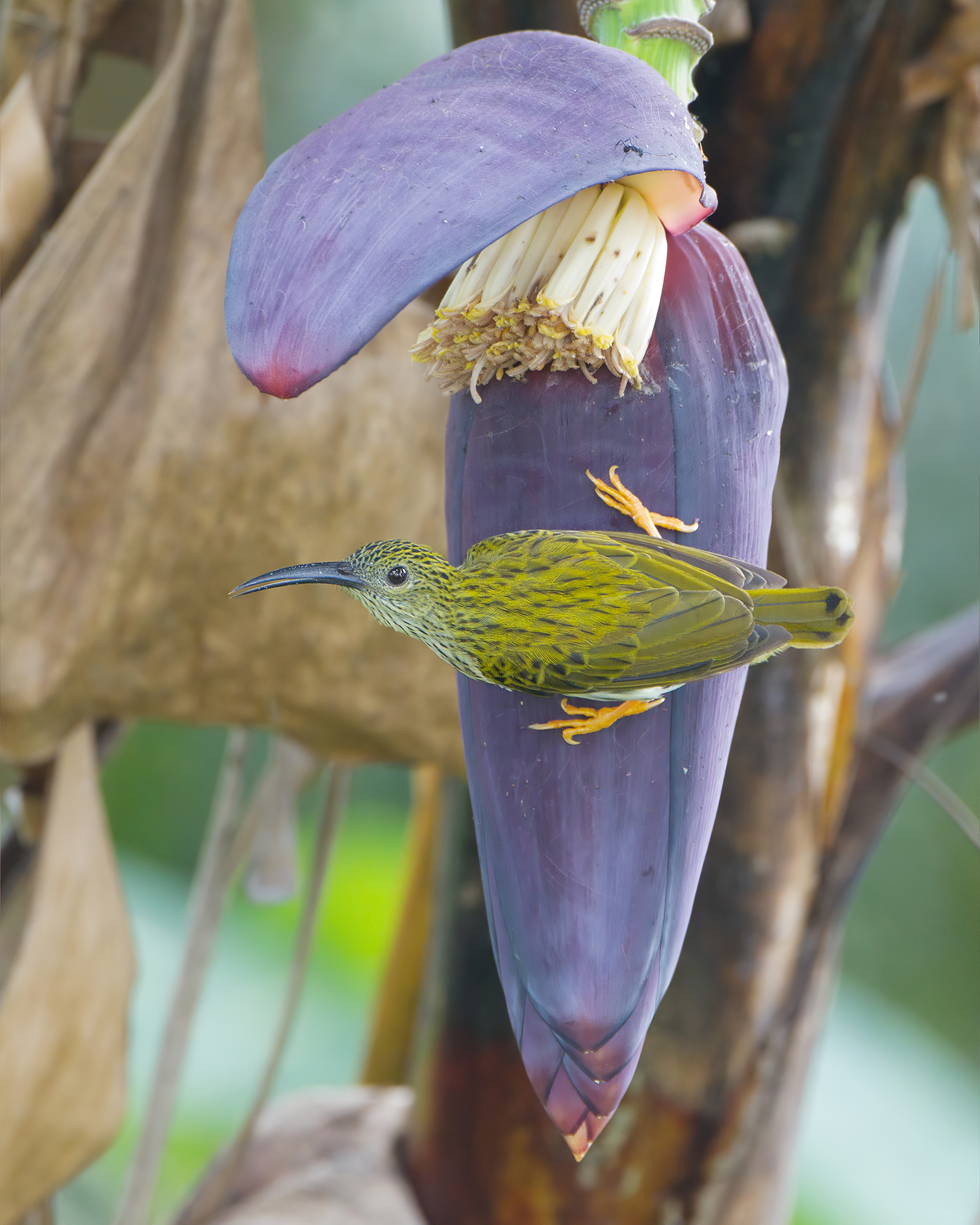
A streaked spiderhunter about to feed on a banana palm inflorescence

The spiderhunters are amongst the largest of their family, measuring between 13 and 22 cm (5.1 and 8.7 in) in length. The spectacled spiderhunter is the heaviest of the sunbirds, weighing as much as 49 g (1.7 oz). The bills of the spiderhunters are long, at least twice the length of the head, and are decurved and stout. The tongue forms a complete tube for most of its length. The plumage is much drabber than the other brightly coloured sunbirds, is the same for both sexes, and contains no iridescence. The uppersides of most species are olive-green and the undersides dull white or yellow—in half the species the undersides are streaked. The most atypical spiderhunter plumage is that of the Whitehead's spiderhunter, which is dark brown with white streaking on the undersides and back and a yellow rump.

The calls of the spiderhunters are very simple, typically a metallic chip which is repeated multiple times to form the song. The song of the little spiderhunter is described as an "incessant squeaky whistle".

== Diet and feeding ==
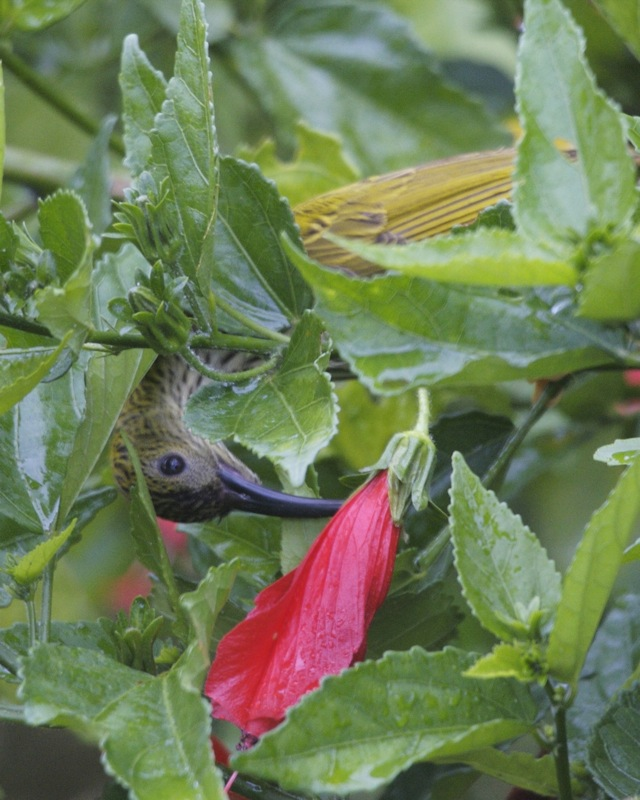
This streaked spiderhunter has pierced the side of a closed hibiscus flower and is drinking the nectar without pollinating the flower—a tactic known as nectar robbing.

The spiderhunters are omnivorous. As their name suggests they will eat spiders, and are capable of extracting spiders from the centre of their webs, a tricky task. They also consume a wide range of other small arthropod prey including crickets, caterpillars, butterflies, ants and other insects. In addition to animal prey they also consume nectar from flowers. Their tubular tongue is pushed against the top of the upper mandible of the bill, then pulled in and out, creating a pressure difference which allows the nectar to be sucked into the mouth. Spiderhunters may be important pollinators of some species of plants, and species pollinated by spiderhunters have long tubular flowers. They may also participate in nectar robbing, which consists of inserting the bill into the side of the flower to extract nectar without being dabbed with pollen. Little is known about their territorial behaviour, but there have been reports of some species defending territories. The spiderhunters are less gregarious than other sunbirds, and are usually seen alone or as part of a pair.

== Breeding ==
The spiderhunters are thought to be monogamous like most of the rest of the family. They vary from the other sunbirds in the nature of their nest, which is suspended underneath a large leaf, usually a banana leaf but sometimes a palm frond or even a branch. The style of nest can be quite variable, a simple cup in the case of the streaked spiderhunter, an elongated tube for the yellow-eared spiderhunter and a bottle shape for the long-billed spiderhunter. The nests are suspended from the leaf by using spider web or by pushing plant fibres through the leaf. The nests are made of grasses and leaves and lined with soft materials. Nest construction, as is typical of the family, is carried out by the female alone. Unlike the other sunbirds, however, both the male and female incubate the eggs. The spiderhunters lay two or three eggs. Their nests are sometimes parasitised by cuckoos.

== Species ==
The genus contains the following 13 species:

Image	Common name	Scientific name	Distribution
	Little spiderhunter	Arachnothera longirostra	Bangladesh, Bhutan, Brunei, Cambodia, China, India, Indonesia, Laos, Malaysia, Myanmar, Nepal, Philippines, Thailand, and Vietnam.
	Orange-tufted spiderhunter	Arachnothera flammifera	Philippines.
	Pale spiderhunter	Arachnothera dilutior	Palawan.
	Thick-billed spiderhunter	Arachnothera crassirostris	Brunei, Indonesia, Malaysia, Singapore, and Thailand.
	Long-billed spiderhunter	Arachnothera robusta	Brunei, Indonesia, Malaysia, and Thailand.
	Spectacled spiderhunter	Arachnothera flavigaster	Brunei, Indonesia, Malaysia, Singapore, Thailand, and Vietnam.
	Yellow-eared spiderhunter	Arachnothera chrysogenys	Brunei, Indonesia, Malaysia, Myanmar, Singapore, Thailand, and Vietnam.
	Naked-faced spiderhunter	Arachnothera clarae	Philippines.
	Grey-breasted spiderhunter	Arachnothera modesta	Brunei, Indonesia, Malaysia, Myanmar, Singapore, Thailand, and Vietnam.
	Streaky-breasted spiderhunter	Arachnothera affinis	Java and Bali
	Bornean spiderhunter	Arachnothera everetti	Borneo.
	Streaked spiderhunter	Arachnothera magna	Bangladesh, Bhutan, Cambodia, China, India, Laos, Malaysia, Myanmar, Nepal, Thailand, and Vietnam.
	Whitehead's spiderhunter	Arachnothera juliae	Borneo
