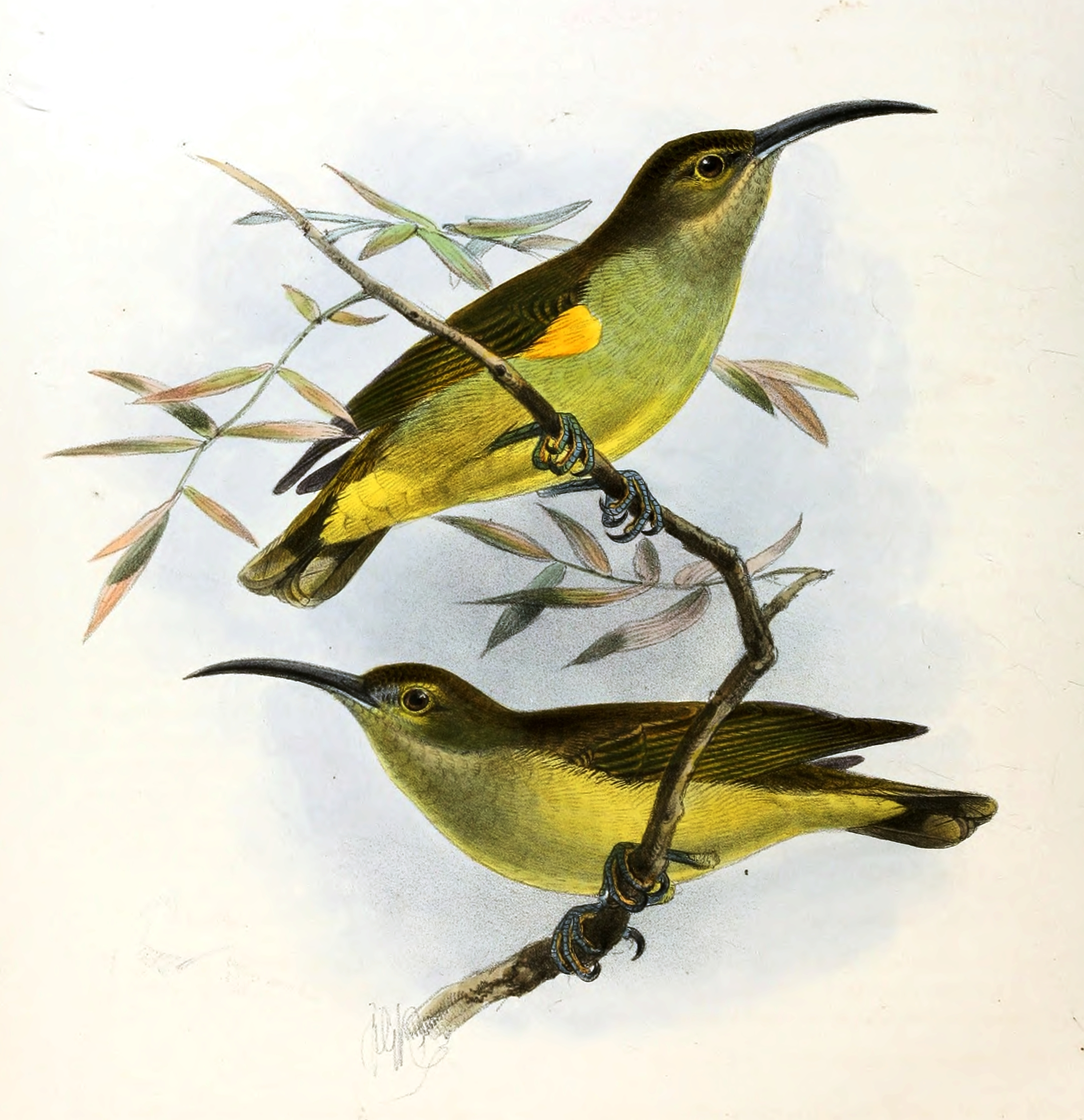

Conservation status
- Least Concern (IUCN 3.1)

Scientific classification
- Kingdom: Animalia
- Phylum: Chordata
- Class: Aves
- Order: Passeriformes
- Family: Nectariniidae
- Genus: Arachnothera
- Species: A. crassirostris

Binomial name
- Arachnothera crassirostris (Reichenbach, 1853)

= Thick-billed spiderhunter =

Species of bird

The thick-billed spiderhunter (Arachnothera crassirostris) is a species of bird in the family Nectariniidae. It is found in Brunei, Indonesia, Malaysia, Singapore, and Thailand. Its natural habitats are subtropical or tropical moist lowland forests and subtropical or tropical moist montane forests.

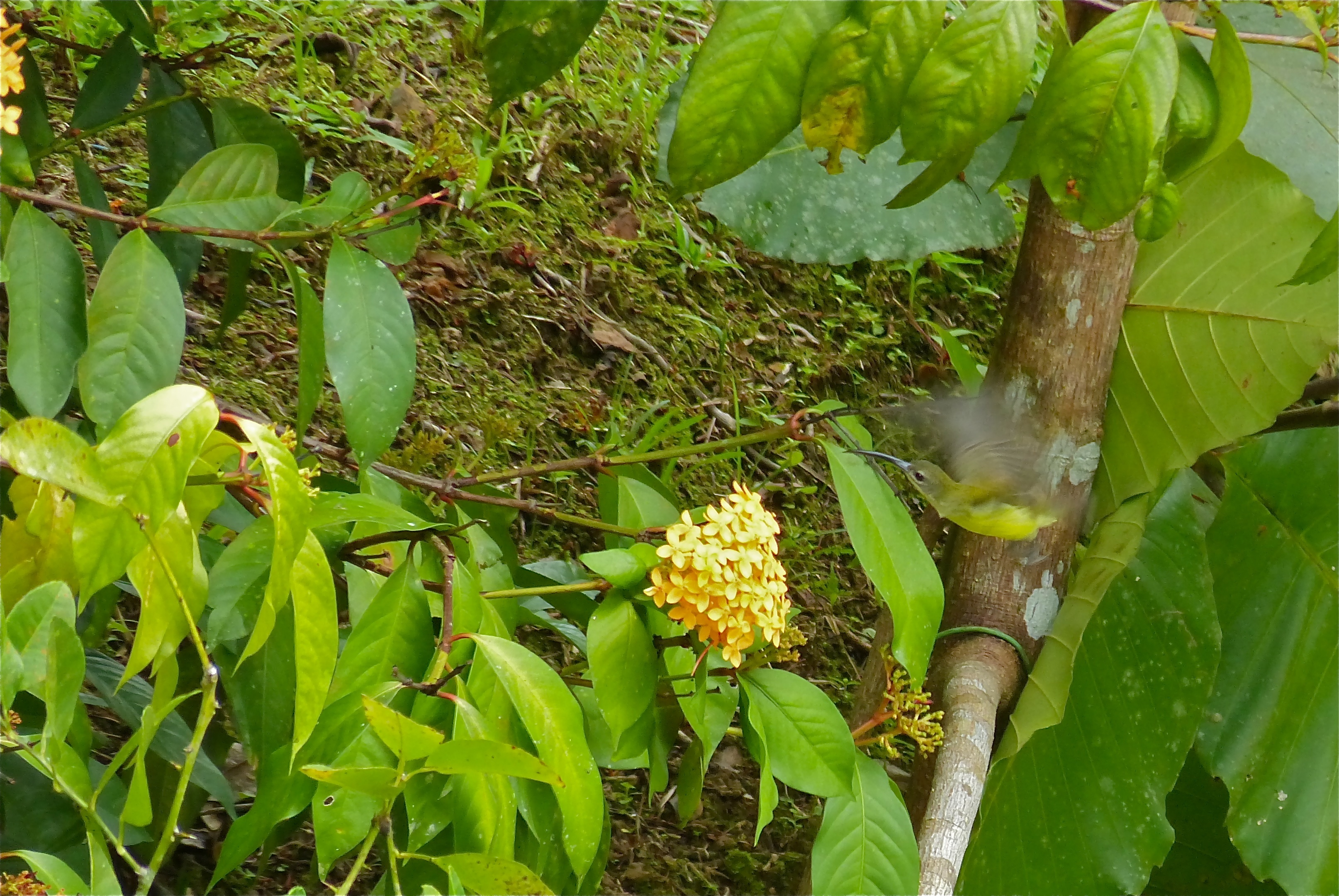
