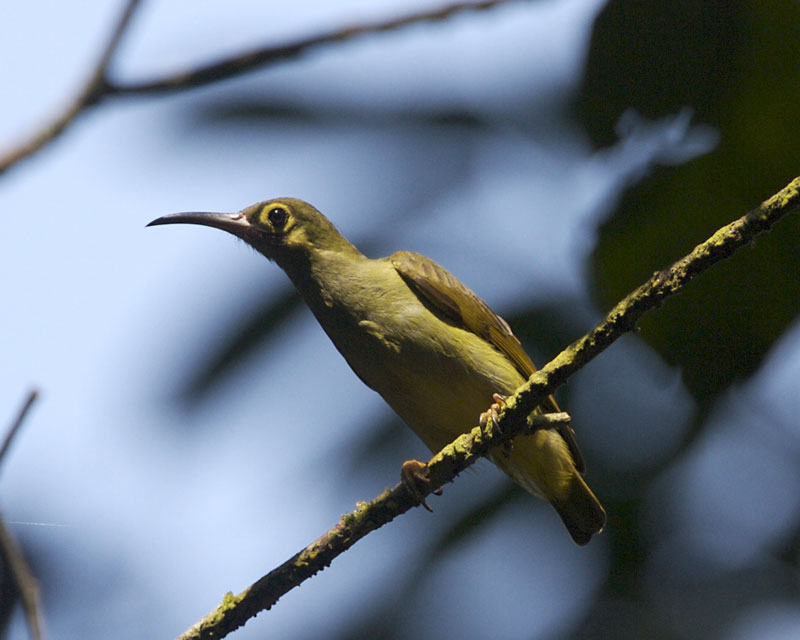

Conservation status
- Least Concern (IUCN 3.1)

Scientific classification
- Kingdom: Animalia
- Phylum: Chordata
- Class: Aves
- Order: Passeriformes
- Family: Nectariniidae
- Genus: Arachnothera
- Species: A. flavigaster

Binomial name
- Arachnothera flavigaster (Eyton, 1839)

= Spectacled spiderhunter =

Species of bird

The spectacled spiderhunter (Arachnothera flavigaster) is a species of bird in the family Nectariniidae. It is found in Brunei, Indonesia, Malaysia, Singapore, Thailand, and Vietnam. Its natural habitats are subtropical or tropical moist lowland forest and subtropical or tropical moist montane forest. This is both the largest spiderhunter and the largest representative of the entire sunbird family. The total length of this species is around 22 cm (8.7 in) and body mass is around 38.4 to 49 g (1.35 to 1.73 oz).
