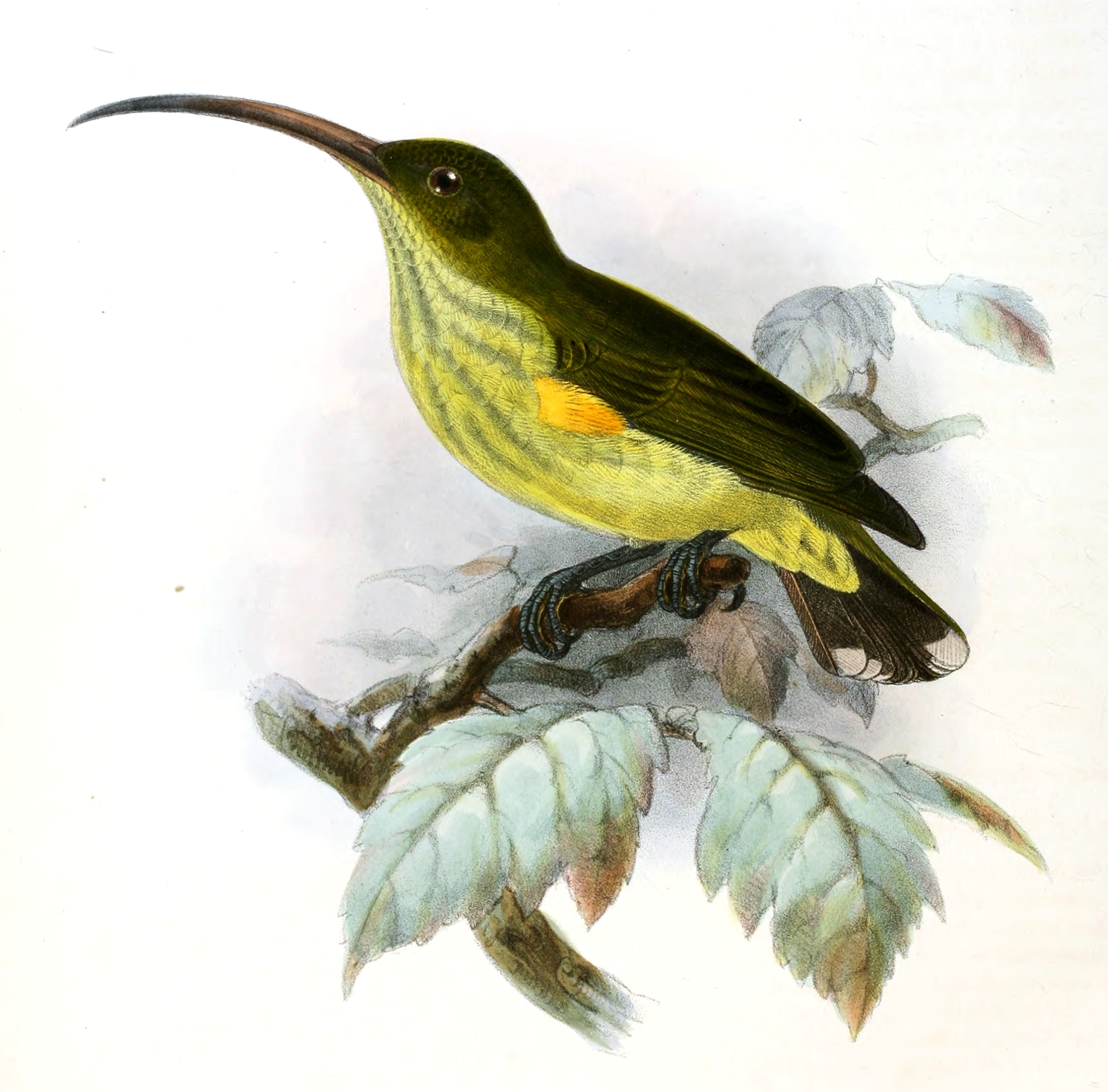

Conservation status
- Least Concern (IUCN 3.1)

Scientific classification
- Kingdom: Animalia
- Phylum: Chordata
- Class: Aves
- Order: Passeriformes
- Family: Nectariniidae
- Genus: Arachnothera
- Species: A. robusta

Binomial name
- Arachnothera robusta Müller & Schlegel, 1844

= Long-billed spiderhunter =

Species of bird

The long-billed spiderhunter (Arachnothera robusta) is a species of bird in the family Nectariniidae. It is found in Brunei, Indonesia, Malaysia, and Thailand. Its natural habitats are subtropical or tropical moist lowland forests and subtropical or tropical moist montane forests.
