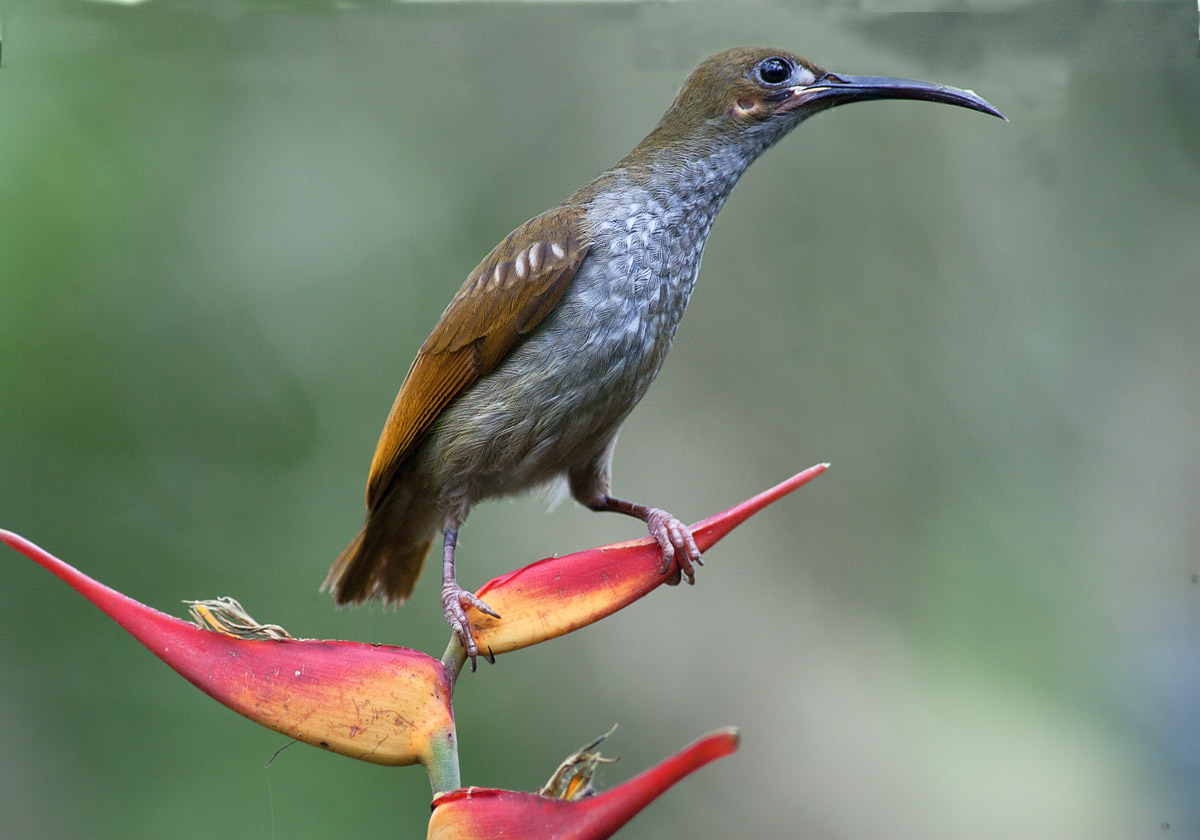
- Plush-lored Spiderhunter of the luzonensis subspecies.

Conservation status
- Least Concern (IUCN 3.1)

Scientific classification
- Kingdom: Animalia
- Phylum: Chordata
- Class: Aves
- Order: Passeriformes
- Family: Nectariniidae
- Genus: Arachnothera
- Species: A. clarae

Binomial name
- Arachnothera clarae Blasius, 1890

= Naked-faced spiderhunter =

Species of bird

The naked-faced spiderhunter (Arachnothera clarae) is a species of bird in the family Nectariniidae, of the passerines order. It is endemic to the Philippines.

In 2026, a paper was written by Nigel Collar, Matthew Halley and Robert Hutchinson suggesting that this is a species complex of three different species namely the Plush-lored Spiderhunter of Luzon, the Bare-banded Spiderhunter of Eastern Visayas and the Dark-lored Spiderhunter of Mindanao.

== Description and taxonomy ==
The naked-faced spiderhunter is a small to medium-sized passerine bird with a long, downward curved bill. The plumage is predominantly olive green, pale yellow on the abdomen, with olive yellow on the wings and faint streaking on the breast. A characteristic feature is a patch of orange bare skin at the base of the bill, which gives the species its name. Birds in the east-central part of the range have an additional naked patch just above the bill. The species somewhat resembles the orange-tufted spiderhunter, but is larger and darker underneath. The calls include a rough drill, "grrrrrrrrr!".

It is not clear who the bird's scientific species name clarae refers to, but it may be in memory of Clara Blasius (1878–1880), the late sister of August Wilhelm Heinrich Blasius who described the species in 1890.

=== Subspecies ===
Four subspecies are recognized

- Arachnothera clarae luzonensis – found in the Sierra Madre mountain range on the island of Luzon in the northern Philippines. Orange retices, gray scaly breast and bluish-gray plush lores. Will become Plush-lored Spiderhunter
- Arachnothera clarae philippinensis – occurs on Samar, Leyte and Biliran in the eastern Philippines. Pink skin on lores. Will become Bare-banded Spider
- Arachnothera clarae clarae – found in the Davao area of Mindanao island in the southern Philippines
- Arachnothera clarae malindangensis – occurs in the central and western parts of Mindanao island in the southern Philippines.

In 2026, a paper was written by Nigel Collar, Matthew Halley and Robert Hutchinson suggesting that this is a species complex of three different species namely the Plush-lored Spiderhunter of Luzon of what formerly was the luzonensis , the Bare-banded Spiderhunter of Eastern Visayas of the philippinensis subspecies and the Dark-lored Spiderhunter of Mindanao which consists of malindangensis and the nominate clarae . The paper also suggests that clarae and malindangensis be treated as synonyms.

== Ecology and behavior ==
The naked-faced spiderhunter is found in forests and shrublands in low-lying areas and lower mountains. It has a preference for banana flowers.

Its nest has been recorded with main breeding season believed to be from April to June although immature birds have been recorded almost throughout the year.

== Habitat and conservation status ==
The species has a wide range and its population is considered stable. The International Union for Conservation of Nature (IUCN) therefore lists it as Least Concern (LC).

However, deforestation in the Philippines continues throughout the country due to slash and burn farming, mining, illegal logging and habitat conversion.

It is found in multiple protected areas such as Pasonanca Natural Park, Bataan National Park, Mount Banahaw, Mount Kitanglad. Mount Apo and Northern Sierra Madre Natural Park but like all areas in the Philippines, protection is lax and deforestation continues despite this protection on paper.
