= Streaked spiderhunter =

Conservation status
- Least Concern (IUCN 3.1)

Scientific classification
- Kingdom: Animalia
- Phylum: Chordata
- Class: Aves
- Order: Passeriformes
- Family: Nectariniidae
- Genus: Arachnothera
- Species: A. magna

Binomial name
- Arachnothera magna (Hodgson, 1836)

Species of bird

The streaked spiderhunter (Arachnothera magna) is a species of bird in the family Nectariniidae.

== Description ==
It is similar in size to a sparrow. It is olive yellow in color, with multiple darker streaks. It has a long, curved black beak and yellow legs. Below, it is pale yellow streaked with black. Its beak is specially adapted for a nectar diet.

== Distribution and habitat ==
Its range extends from central Nepal towards Northeast India, much of Indochina, central parts of the Malay Peninsula and the Chinese provinces of Yunnan and Guangxi. Its natural habitats are subtropical or tropical moist lowland forest and montane forest.

== Behavior ==
This species can be found alone or in pairs. The nesting season is from March to July. The nest is usually made of leaves that are tied together with cobwebs, and they are found attached to the reverse side of a leaf.

== Diet ==
It feeds on the nectar of flowers such as the wild banana blossom.

== Gallery ==
Streaked spiderhunter in Kaeng Krachan National Park, Thailand

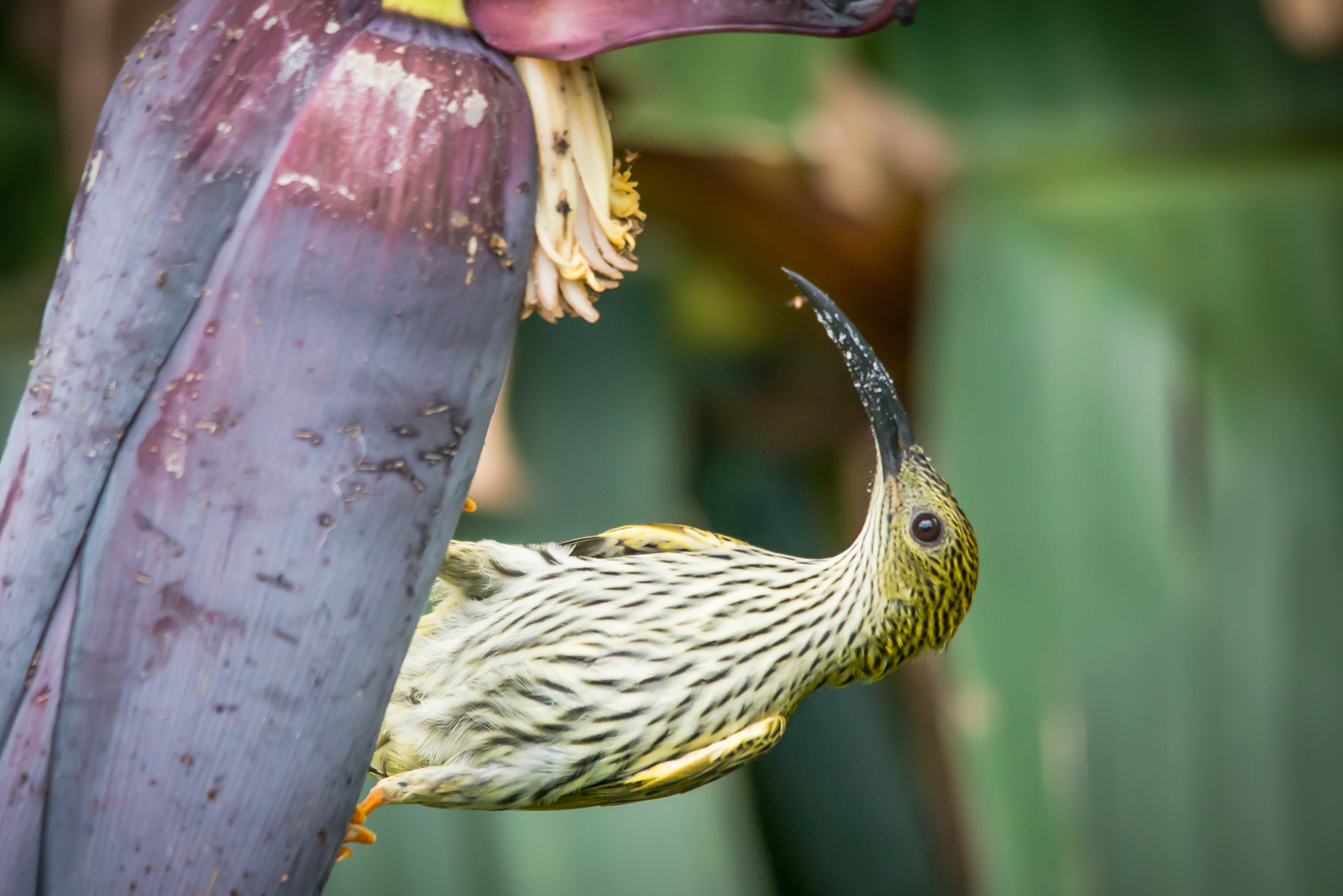
In Kaeng Krachan National Park, Thailand

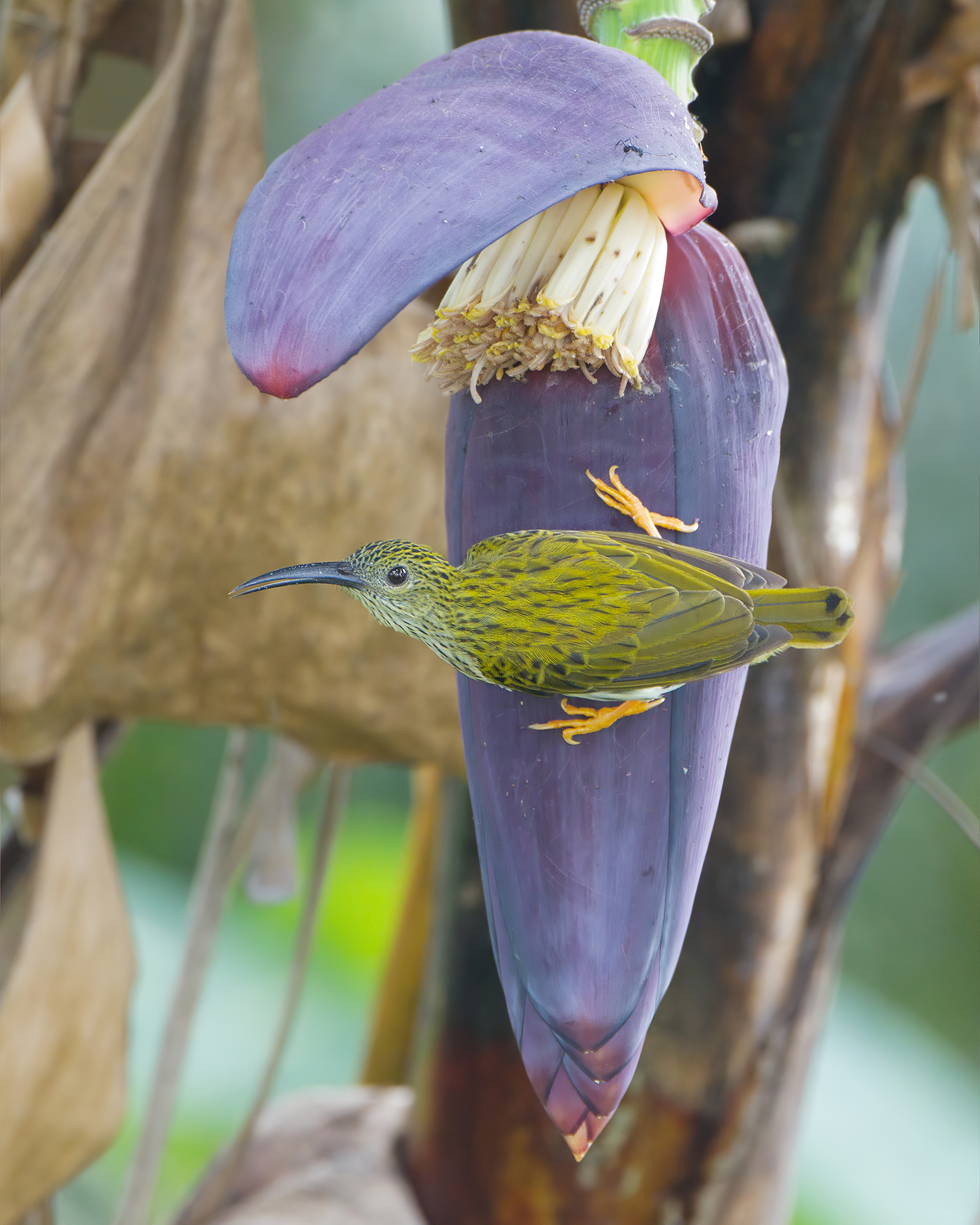
About to feed on a banana inflorescence

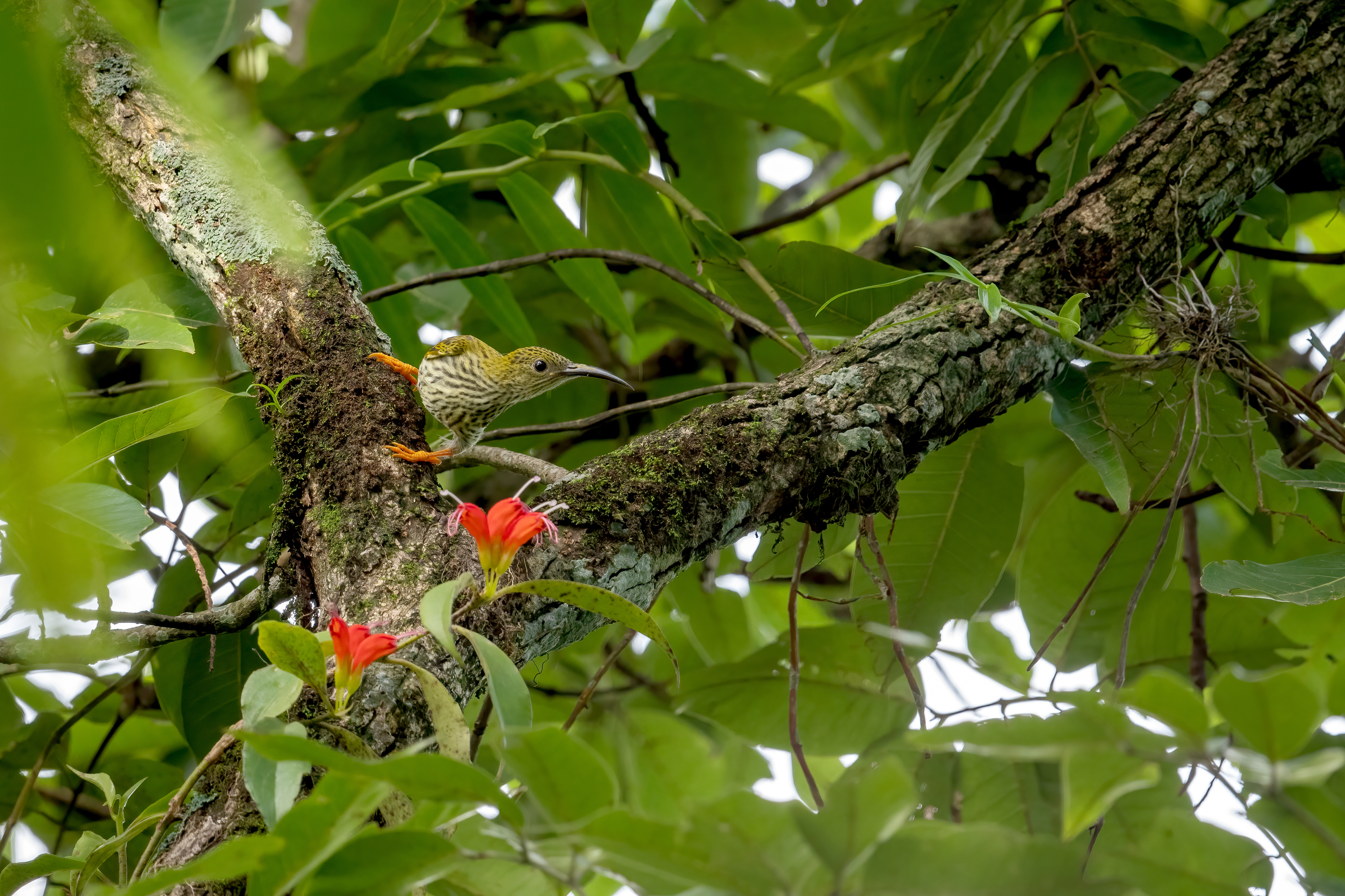
In Chandi Bhanjyang, Nepal

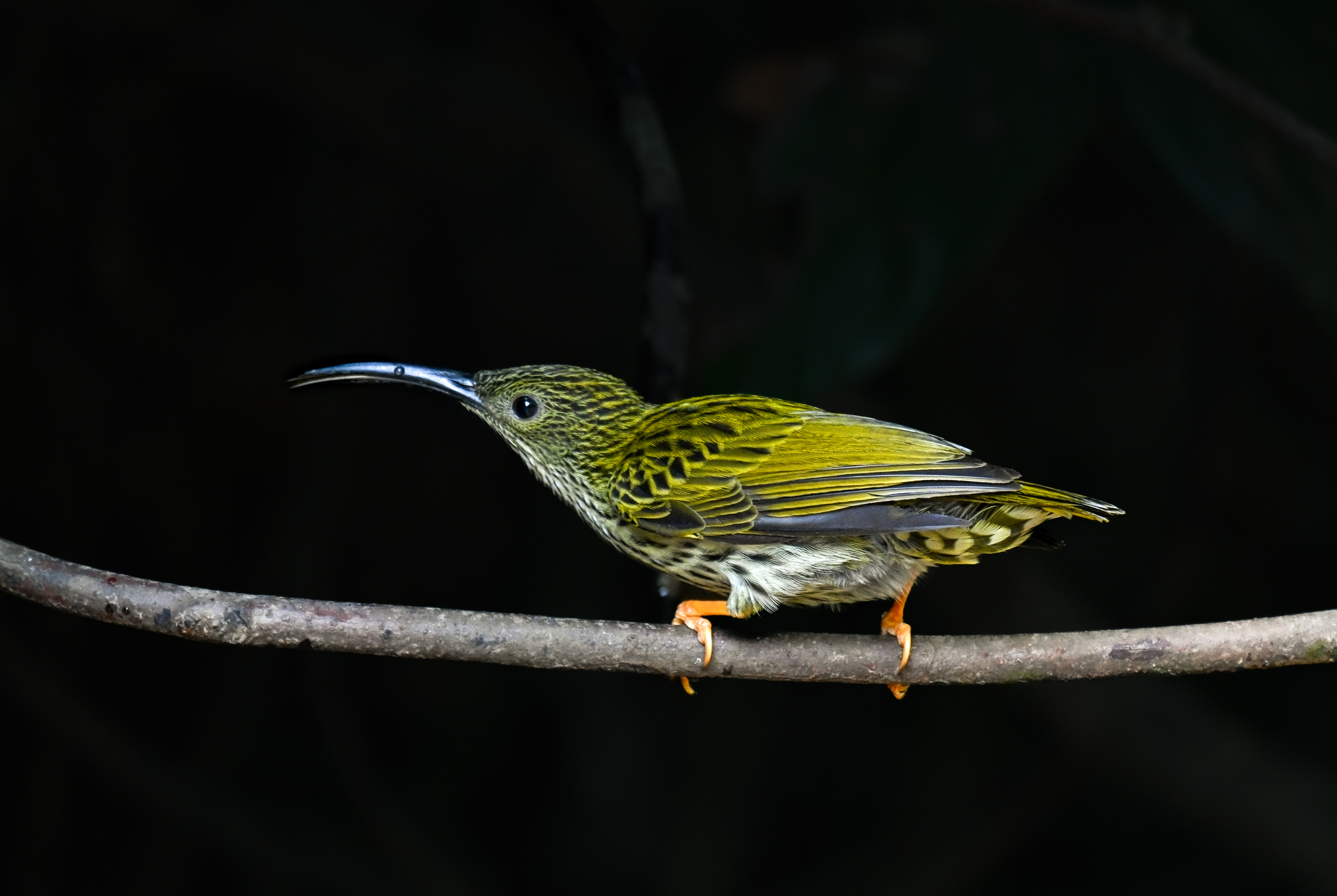
Dulung Reserve Forest, Lakhimpur District, Assam
