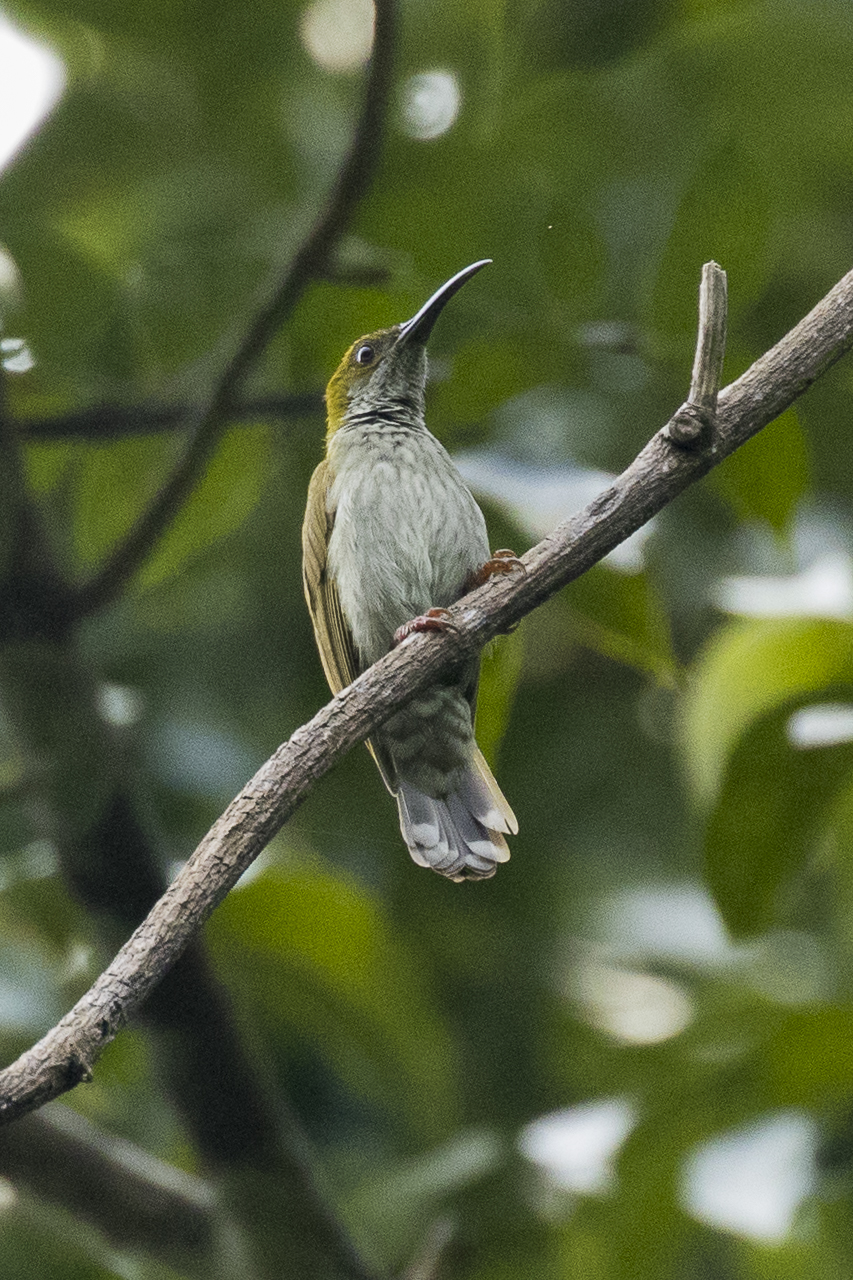

Conservation status
- Least Concern (IUCN 3.1)

Scientific classification
- Kingdom: Animalia
- Phylum: Chordata
- Class: Aves
- Order: Passeriformes
- Family: Nectariniidae
- Genus: Arachnothera
- Species: A. affinis

Binomial name
- Arachnothera affinis (Horsfield, 1821)

= Streaky-breasted spiderhunter =

Species of bird

The streaky-breasted spiderhunter (Arachnothera affinis) is a species of bird in the family Nectariniidae. It is found in Java and Bali. Its natural habitats are subtropical or tropical moist lowland forests and subtropical or tropical moist montane forests. It is sometimes considered conspecific with the grey-breasted spiderhunter.
