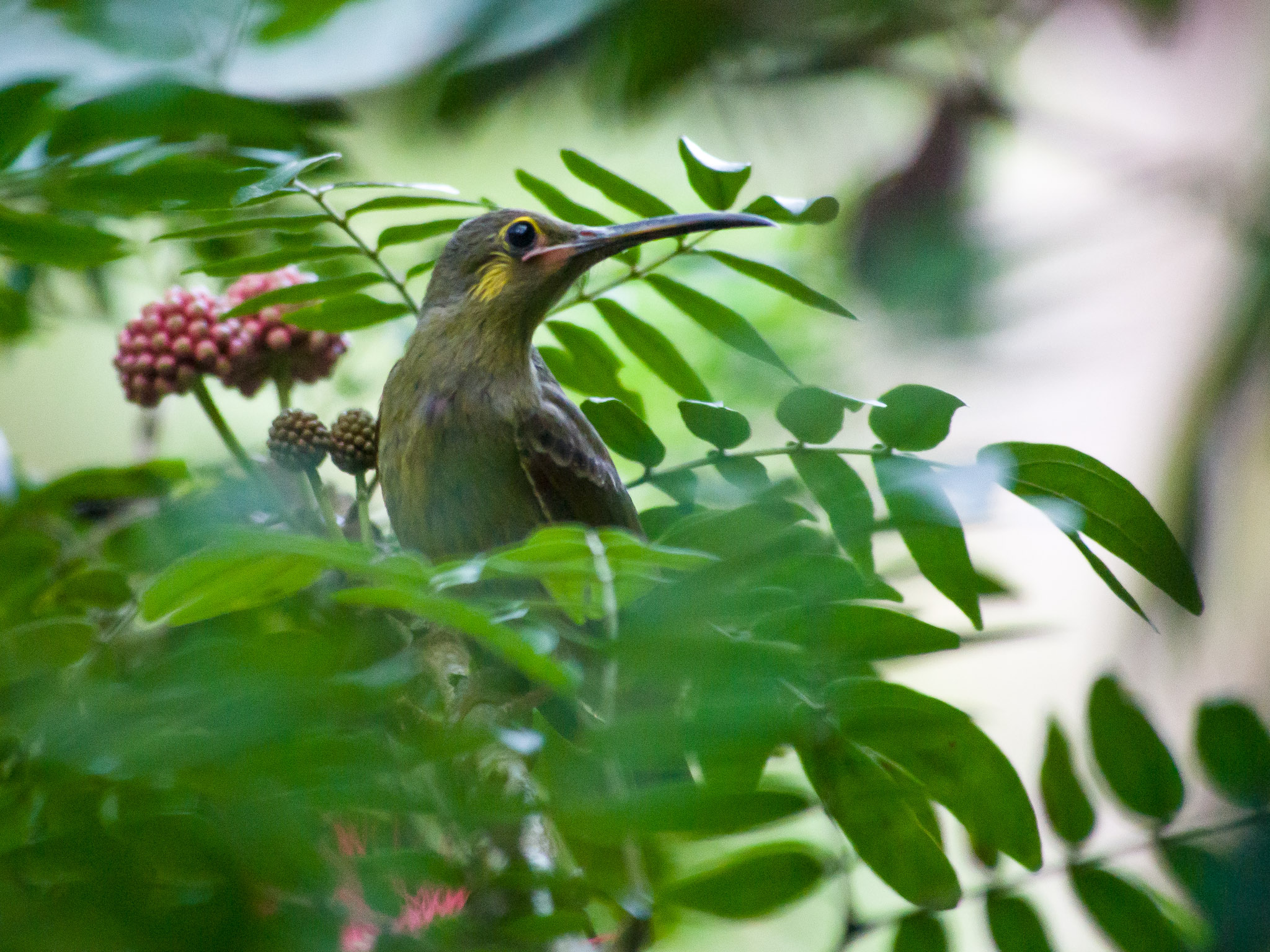

Conservation status
- Least Concern (IUCN 3.1)

Scientific classification
- Kingdom: Animalia
- Phylum: Chordata
- Class: Aves
- Order: Passeriformes
- Family: Nectariniidae
- Genus: Arachnothera
- Species: A. chrysogenys

Binomial name
- Arachnothera chrysogenys (Temminck, 1826)

= Yellow-eared spiderhunter =

Species of bird

The yellow-eared spiderhunter (Arachnothera chrysogenys) is a species of bird in the family Nectariniidae. It is found in Brunei, Indonesia, Malaysia, Myanmar, Singapore, Thailand, and Vietnam. Its natural habitats are subtropical or tropical moist lowland forests, subtropical or tropical mangrove forests, and subtropical or tropical moist montane forests.
