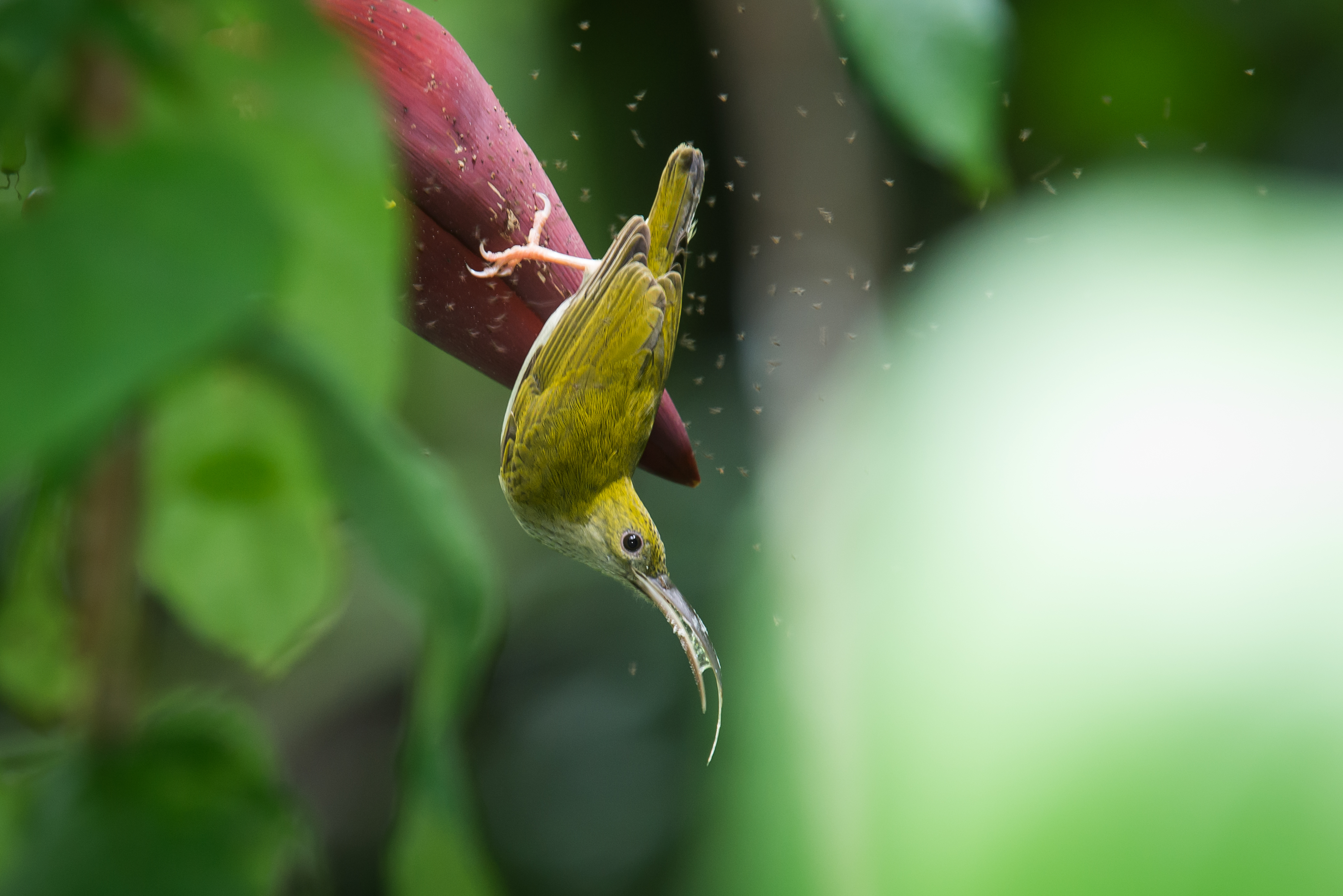

Conservation status
- Least Concern (IUCN 3.1)

Scientific classification
- Kingdom: Animalia
- Phylum: Chordata
- Class: Aves
- Order: Passeriformes
- Family: Nectariniidae
- Genus: Arachnothera
- Species: A. modesta

Binomial name
- Arachnothera modesta (Eyton, 1839)

= Grey-breasted spiderhunter =

Species of bird

The grey-breasted spiderhunter (Arachnothera modesta) is a species of bird in the family Nectariniidae. It is found in Brunei, Indonesia, Malaysia, Myanmar, Singapore, Thailand, and Vietnam. Its natural habitats are subtropical or tropical moist lowland forest and subtropical or tropical moist montane forest. It is sometimes considered conspecific with the streaky-breasted spiderhunter.

== Gallery ==
Grey-breasted spiderhunter, Taman Negara, Malaysia, Sept 1997
