= List of birds of Sumatra =

Sumatra is one of the richest islands in Indonesia for animals. Its bird total species is second only to New Guinea. This great wealth is due to the large size of Sumatra, its diversity of habitat and also its past link with the Asian mainland. This following list of birds is based on the taxonomic treatment and scientific nomenclature of The Clements Checklist of Birds of the World, 6th edition.

== Ducks, geese and swans ==
Order: Anseriformes Family: Anatidae

Common name	Binomial	Picture
Wandering whistling duck	Dendrocygna arcuata	
Lesser whistling duck	Dendrocygna javanica	
White-winged duck	Asarcornis scutulata	
Cotton pygmy goose	Nettapus coromandelianus	
Pacific black duck	Anas superciliosa	
Sunda teal	Anas gibberifrons	

== Pheasants, grouse, and allies ==
Order: Galliformes Family: Phasianidae

Common name	Binomial	Picture
Long-billed partridge	Rhizothera longirostris	
Black partridge	Melanoperdix niger	
Blue-breasted quail	Synoicus chinensis	
Roll's partridge	Arborophila rolli	
Sumatran partridge	Arborophila sumatrana	
Gray-breasted partridge	Arborophila orientalis	
Red-billed partridge	Arborophila rubirostris	
Chestnut-necklaced partridge	Tropicoperdix charltonii	
Ferruginous partridge	Caloperdix oculeus	
Crested partridge	Rollulus rouloul	
Red junglefowl	Gallus gallus	
Malayan crestless fireback	Lophura erythrophthalma	
Malayan crested fireback	Lophura rufa	
Salvadori's pheasant	Lophura inornata	
Bronze-tailed peacock-pheasant	Polyplectron chalcurum	
Great argus	Argusianus argus	

== Shearwaters and petrels ==
Order: Procellariiformes Family: Procellariidae

Common name	Binomial	Picture
Barau's petrel	Pterodroma baraui	
Bulwer's petrel	Bulweria bulwerii	
Streaked shearwater	Calonectris leucomelas	
Flesh-footed shearwater	Ardenna carneipes	
Wedge-tailed shearwater	Ardenna pacifica	

== Austral storm petrels ==
Order: Procellariiformes Family: Oceanitidae

Common name	Binomial	Picture
Wilson's storm petrel	Oceanites oceanicus	
White-faced storm petrel	Pelagodroma marina	

== Northern storm petrels ==
Order: Procellariiformes Family: Hydrobatidae

Common name	Binomial	Picture
Swinhoe's storm petrel	Hydrobates monorhis	
Matsudaira's storm petrel	Hydrobates matsudairae	

== Tropicbirds ==
Order: Phaethontiformes Family: Phaethontidae

Common name	Binomial	Picture
White-tailed tropicbird	Phaethon lepturus	
Red-tailed tropicbird	Phaethon rubricauda	

== Storks ==
Order: Ciconiiformes Family: Ciconiidae

Common name	Binomial	Picture
Milky stork	Mycteria cinerea	
Asian woolly-necked stork	Ciconia episcopus	
Storm's stork	Ciconia stormi	
Lesser adjutant	Leptoptilos javanicus	

== Frigatebirds ==
Order: Suliformes Family: Fregatidae

Common name	Binomial	Picture
Christmas frigatebird	Fregata andrewsi	
Great frigatebird	Fregata minor	
Lesser frigatebird	Fregata ariel	

== Boobies and gannets ==
Order: Suliformes Family: Sulidae

Common name	Binomial	Picture
Masked booby	Sula dactylatra	
Red-footed booby	Sula sula	
Brown booby	Sula leucogaster	

== Cormorants ==
Order: Suliformes Family: Phalacrocoracidae

Common name	Binomial	Picture
Little black cormorant	Phalacrocorax sulcirostris	
Little cormorant	Microcarbo niger	

== Darters ==
Order: Suliformes Family: Anhingidae

Common name	Binomial	Picture
Oriental darter	Anhinga melanogaster	

== Pelicans ==
Order: Pelecaniformes Family: Pelecanidae

Common name	Binomial	Picture
Spot-billed pelican	Pelecanus philippensis	

== Herons, egrets, and bitterns ==
Order: Pelecaniformes Family: Ardeidae

Common name	Binomial	Picture
Gray heron	Ardea cinerea	
Great-billed heron	Ardea sumatrana	
Purple heron	Ardea purpurea	
Great egret	Ardea alba	
Intermediate egret	Ardea intermedia	
Little egret	Egretta garzetta	
White-faced heron	Egretta novaehollandiae	
Chinese egret	Egretta eulophotes	
Pacific reef-heron	Egretta sacra	
Chinese pond-heron	Ardeola bacchus	
Javan pond-heron	Ardeola speciosa	
Eastern cattle egret	Ardea coromanda	
Striated heron	Butorides striata	
Black-crowned night-heron	Nycticorax nycticorax	
Nankeen night-heron	Nycticorax caledonicus	
Malayan night-heron	Gorsachius melanolophus	
Yellow bittern	Ixobrychus sinensis	
Schrenck's bittern	Ixobrychus eurhythmus	
Cinnamon bittern	Ixobrychus cinnamomeus	
Black bittern	Ixobrychus flavicollis	

== Ibises and spoonbills ==
Order: Pelecaniformes Family: Threskiornithidae

Common name	Binomial	Picture
Black-headed ibis	Threskiornis melanocephalus	

== Osprey ==
Order: Accipitriformes Family: Pandionidae

Common name	Binomial	Picture
Osprey	Pandion haliaetus	

== Hawks, eagles, and kites ==
Order: Accipitriformes Family: Accipitridae

Common name	Binomial	Picture
Jerdon's baza	Aviceda jerdoni	
Pacific baza	Aviceda subcristata	
Black baza	Aviceda leuphotes	
Oriental honey-buzzard	Pernis ptilorhynchus	
Bat hawk	Macheiramphus alcinus	
Black kite	Milvus migrans	
Black-winged kite	Elanus caeruleus	
Brahminy kite	Haliastur indus	
White-bellied sea-eagle	Haliaeetus leucogaster	
Lesser fish-eagle	Haliaeetus humilis	
Gray-headed fish-eagle	Haliaeetus ichthyaetus	
Crested serpent-eagle	Spilornis cheela	
Greater spotted eagle	Clanga clanga	
Booted eagle	Hieraaetus pennatus	
Eurasian marsh-harrier	Circus aeruginosus	
Pied harrier	Circus melanoleucos	
Eastern marsh-harrier	Circus spilonotus	
Crested goshawk	Accipiter trivirgatus	
Brown goshawk	Accipiter fasciatus	
Shikra	Accipiter badius	
Chinese sparrowhawk	Accipiter soloensis	
Japanese sparrowhawk	Accipiter gularis	
Besra	Accipiter virgatus	
Gray-faced buzzard	Butastur indicus	
Black eagle	Ictinaetus malaiensis	
Rufous-bellied eagle	Lophotriorchis kienerii	
Eastern buzzard	Buteo japonicus	
Changeable hawk-eagle	Nisaetus cirrhatus	
Blyth's hawk-eagle	Nisaetus alboniger	
Sulawesi hawk-eagle	Nisaetus lanceolatus	
Wallace's hawk-eagle	Nisaetus nanus	

== Caracaras and falcons ==
Order: Falconiformes Family: Falconidae

Common name	Binomial	Picture
Black-thighed falconet	Microhierax fringillarius	
Peregrine falcon	Falco peregrinus	

== Rails, gallinules, and coots ==
Order: Gruiformes Family: Rallidae

Common name	Binomial	Picture
Red-legged crake	Rallina fasciata	
Slaty-legged crake	Rallina eurizonoides	
Buff-banded rail	Gallirallus philippensis	
Slaty-breasted rail	Lewinia striata	
White-breasted waterhen	Amaurornis phoenicurus	
White-browed crake	Poliolimnas cinereus	
Baillon's crake	Zapornia pusilla	
Ruddy-breasted crake	Zapornia fusca	
Band-bellied crake	Zapornia paykullii	
Watercock	Gallicrex cinerea	
Black-backed swamphen	Porphyrio indicus	
Eurasian moorhen	Gallinula chloropus	

== Sungrebe and finfoots ==
Order: Gruiformes Family: Heliornithidae

Common name	Binomial	Picture
Masked finfoot	Heliopais personata	

== Thick-knees ==
Order: Charadriiformes Family: Burhinidae

Common name	Binomial	Picture
Beach thick-knee	Esacus magnirostris	

== Avocets and stilts ==
Order: Charadriiformes Family: Recurvirostridae

Common name	Binomial	Picture
White-headed stilt	Himantopus leucocephalus	

== Plovers and lapwings ==
Order: Charadriiformes Family: Charadriidae

Common name	Binomial	Picture
Pacific golden-plover	Pluvialis fulva	
Black-bellied plover	Pluvialis squatarola	
Gray-headed lapwing	Vanellus cinereus	
Red-wattled lapwing	Vanellus indicus	
Javan lapwing	Vanellus macropterus	
Little ringed plover	Charadrius dubius	
Kentish plover	Charadrius alexandrinus	
Malaysian plover	Charadrius peronii	
Lesser sand-plover	Charadrius mongolus	
Greater sand-plover	Charadrius leschenaultii	
Oriental plover	Charadrius veredus	

== Painted-snipe ==
Order: Charadriiformes Family: Rostratulidae

Common name	Binomial	Picture
Greater painted-snipe	Rostratula benghalensis	

== Jacanas ==
Order: Charadriiformes Family: Jacanidae

Common name	Binomial	Picture
Pheasant-tailed jacana	Hydrophasianus chirurgus	
Bronze-winged jacana	Metopidius indicus	

== Sandpipers and allies ==
Order: Charadriiformes Family: Scolopacidae

Common name	Binomial	Picture
Javan woodcock	Scolopax saturata	
Swinhoe's snipe	Gallinago megala	
Pintail snipe	Gallinago stenura	
Asian dowitcher	Limnodromus semipalmatus	
Black-tailed godwit	Limosa limosa	
Bar-tailed godwit	Limosa lapponica	
Whimbrel	Numenius phaeopus	
Eurasian curlew	Numenius arquata	
Far Eastern curlew	Numenius madagascariensis	
Common redshank	Tringa totanus	
Marsh sandpiper	Tringa stagnatilis	
Common greenshank	Tringa nebularia	
Nordmann's greenshank	Tringa guttifer	
Wood sandpiper	Tringa glareola	
Grey-tailed tattler	Tringa brevipes	
Terek sandpiper	Xenus cinereus	
Common sandpiper	Actitis hypoleucos	
Ruddy turnstone	Arenaria interpres	
Great knot	Calidris tenuirostris	
Sanderling	Calidris alba	
Red-necked stint	Calidris ruficollis	
Long-toed stint	Calidris subminuta	
Curlew sandpiper	Calidris ferruginea	
Broad-billed sandpiper	Calidris falcinellus	
Ruff	Calidris pugnax	

== Buttonquails ==
Order: Charadriiformes Family: Turnicidae

Common name	Binomial	Picture
Barred buttonquail	Turnix suscitator	

== Pratincoles and coursers ==
Order: Charadriiformes Family: Glareolidae

Common name	Binomial	Picture
Australian pratincole	Stiltia isabella	
Oriental pratincole	Glareola maldivarum	

== Skuas and jaegers ==
Order: Charadriiformes Family: Stercorariidae

Common name	Binomial	Picture
Pomarine skua	Stercorarius pomarinus	

== Gulls, terns, and skimmers ==
Order: Charadriiformes Family: Laridae

Common name	Binomial	Picture
Brown-headed gull	Chroicocephalus brunnicephalus	
Gull-billed tern	Gelochelidon nilotica	
Lesser crested tern	Thalasseus bengalensis	
Great crested tern	Thalasseus bergii	
Roseate tern	Sterna dougallii	
Black-naped tern	Sterna sumatrana	
Common tern	Sterna hirundo	
Little tern	Sternula albifrons	
Bridled tern	Onychoprion anaethetus	
Sooty tern	Onychoprion fuscatus	
Whiskered tern	Chlidonias hybrida	
White-winged tern	Chlidonias leucopterus	
Black noddy	Anous minutus	
Brown noddy	Anous stolidus	

== Pigeons and doves ==
Order: Columbiformes Family: Columbidae

Common name	Binomial	Picture
Silvery wood-pigeon	Columba argentina	
Spotted dove	Spilopelia chinensis	
Barred cuckoo-dove	Macropygia unchall	
Ruddy cuckoo-dove	Macropygia emiliana	
Enggano cuckoo-dove	Macropygia cinnamomea	
Barusan cuckoo-dove	Macropygia modigliani	
Little cuckoo-dove	Macropygia ruficeps	
Emerald dove	Chalcophaps indica	
Zebra dove	Geopelia striata	
Nicobar pigeon	Caloenas nicobarica	
Little green pigeon	Treron olax	
Pink-necked green pigeon	Treron vernans	
Cinnamon-headed green pigeon	Treron fulvicollis	
Thick-billed green pigeon	Treron curvirostra	
Large green pigeon	Treron capellei	
Green-spectacled pigeon	Treron oxyurus	
Wedge-tailed green pigeon	Treron sphenurus	
Pink-headed fruit dove	Ptilinopus porphyreus	
Jambu fruit dove	Ptilinopus jambu	
Green imperial pigeon	Ducula aenea	
Mountain imperial pigeon	Ducula badia	
Pied imperial pigeon	Ducula bicolor	

== Hornbills ==
Order: Bucerotiformes Family: Bucerotidae

Common name	Binomial	Picture
Oriental pied-hornbill	Anthracoceros albirostris	
Black hornbill	Anthracoceros malayanus	
Rhinoceros hornbill	Buceros rhinoceros	
Great hornbill	Buceros bicornis	
Helmeted hornbill	Rhinoplax vigil	
Bushy-crested hornbill	Anorrhinus galeritus	
White-crowned hornbill	Berenicornis comatus	
Wrinkled hornbill	Rhabdotorrhinus corrugatus	
Wreathed hornbill	Rhyticeros undulatus	

== Cuckoos and anis ==
Order: Cuculiformes Family: Cuculidae

Common name	Binomial	Picture
Chestnut-winged cuckoo	Clamator coromandus	
Large hawk-cuckoo	Hierococcyx sparverioides	
Dark hawk-cuckoo	Hierococcyx bocki	
Moustached hawk-cuckoo	Hierococcyx vagans	
Malaysian hawk-cuckoo	Hierococcyx fugax	
Hodgson's hawk-cuckoo	Hierococcyx nisicolor	
Indian cuckoo	Cuculus micropterus	
Oriental cuckoo	Cuculus optatus	
Sunda cuckoo	Cuculus lepidus	
Himalayan cuckoo	Cuculus saturatus	
Banded bay cuckoo	Cacomantis sonneratii	
Plaintive cuckoo	Cacomantis merulinus	
Brush cuckoo	Cacomantis variolosus	
Horsfield's bronze cuckoo	Chrysococcyx basalis	
Little bronze cuckoo	Chrysococcyx minutillus	
Asian emerald cuckoo	Chrysococcyx maculatus	
Violet cuckoo	Chrysococcyx xanthorhynchus	
Square-tailed drongo-cuckoo	Surniculus lugubris	
Asian koel	Eudynamys scolopacea	
Black-bellied malkoha	Phaenicophaeus diardi	
Chestnut-bellied malkoha	Phaenicophaeus sumatranus	
Chestnut-breasted malkoha	Phaenicophaeus curvirostris	
Green-billed malkoha	Phaenicophaeus tristis	
Raffles's malkoha	Rhinortha chlorophaeus	
Red-billed malkoha	Zanclostomus javanicus	
Sumatran ground-cuckoo	Carpococcyx viridis	
Short-toed coucal	Centropus rectunguis	
Greater coucal	Centropus sinensis	
Lesser coucal	Centropus bengalensis	

== Barn owls ==
Order: Strigiformes Family: Tytonidae

Common name	Binomial	Picture
Eastern barn owl	Tyto javanica	
Oriental bay owl	Phodilus badius	

== Typical owls ==
Order: Strigiformes Family: Strigidae

Common name	Binomial	Picture
Reddish scops owl	Otus rufescens	
Mountain scops owl	Otus spilocephalus	
Rajah scops owl	Otus brookii	
Mentawai scops owl	Otus mentawi	
Sunda scops owl	Otus lempiji	
Simeulue scops owl	Otus umbra	
Enggano scops owl	Otus enganensis	
Oriental scops owl	Otus sunia	
Barred eagle-owl	Bubo sumatranus	
Buffy fish owl	Ketupa ketupu	
Spotted wood owl	Strix seloputo	
Brown wood owl	Strix leptogrammica	
Collared owlet	Taenioptynx brodiei	
Brown hawk-owl	Ninox scutulata	

== Frogmouths ==
Order: Caprimulgiformes Family: Podargidae

Common name	Binomial	Picture
Large frogmouth	Batrachostomus auritus	
Gould's frogmouth	Batrachostomus stellatus	
Sumatran frogmouth	Batrachostomus poliolophus	
Blyth's frogmouth	Batrachostomus affinis	
Sunda frogmouth	Batrachostomus cornutus	

== Nightjars ==
Order: Caprimulgiformes Family: Caprimulgidae

Common name	Binomial	Picture
Malaysian nightjar	Lyncornis temminckii	
Great eared-nightjar	Lyncornis macrotis	
Grey nightjar	Caprimulgus jotaka	
Large-tailed nightjar	Caprimulgus macrurus	
Savanna nightjar	Caprimulgus affinis	
Bonaparte's nightjar	Caprimulgus concretus	
Salvadori's nightjar	Caprimulgus pulchellus	

== Swifts ==
Order: Caprimulgiformes Family: Apodidae

Common name	Binomial	Picture
Waterfall swift	Hydrochous gigas	
Plume-toed swiftlet	Collocalia affinis	
Cave swiftlet	Collocalia linchi	
Glossy swiftlet	Collocalia esculenta	
Volcano swiftlet	Aerodramus vulcanorum	
Mossy-nest swiftlet	Aerodramus salangana	
Black-nest swiftlet	Aerodramus maximus	
White-nest swiftlet	Aerodramus fuciphagus	
Germain's swiftlet	Aerodramus germani	
Silver-rumped needletail	Rhaphidura leucopygialis	
White-throated needletail	Hirundapus caudacutus	
Silver-backed needletail	Hirundapus cochinchinensis	
Brown-backed needletail	Hirundapus giganteus	
Asian palm-swift	Cypsiurus balasiensis	
Pacific swift	Apus pacificus	
House swift	Apus nipalensis	

== Treeswifts ==
Order: Caprimulgiformes Family: Hemiprocnidae

Common name	Binomial	Picture
Grey-rumped treeswift	Hemiprocne longipennis	
Whiskered treeswift	Hemiprocne comata	

== Trogons and quetzals ==
Order: Trogoniformes Family: Trogonidae

Common name	Binomial	Picture
Red-naped trogon	Harpactes kasumba	
Diard's trogon	Harpactes diardii	
Sumatran trogon	Apalharpactes mackloti	
Cinnamon-rumped trogon	Harpactes orrhophaeus	
Scarlet-rumped trogon	Harpactes duvaucelii	
Red-headed trogon	Harpactes erythrocephalus	
Orange-breasted trogon	Harpactes oreskios	

== Kingfishers ==
Order: Coraciiformes Family: Alcedinidae

Common name	Binomial	Picture
Common kingfisher	Alcedo atthis	
Blue-eared kingfisher	Alcedo meninting	
Cerulean kingfisher	Alcedo coerulescens	
Oriental dwarf kingfisher	Ceyx erithaca	
Banded kingfisher	Lacedo pulchella	
Stork-billed kingfisher	Pelargopsis capensis	
Ruddy kingfisher	Halcyon coromanda	
White-throated kingfisher	Halcyon smyrnensis	
Black-capped kingfisher	Halcyon pileata	
Collared kingfisher	Todirhamphus chloris	
Sacred kingfisher	Todirhamphus sanctus	
Rufous-collared kingfisher	Actenoides concretus	

== Bee-eaters ==
Order: Coraciiformes Family: Meropidae

Common name	Binomial	Picture
Red-bearded bee-eater	Nyctyornis amictus	
Blue-throated bee-eater	Merops viridis	
Blue-tailed bee-eater	Merops philippinus	
Chestnut-headed bee-eater	Merops leschenaulti	

== Typical rollers ==
Order: Coraciiformes Family: Coraciidae

Common name	Binomial	Picture
Dollarbird	Eurystomus orientalis	

== Asian barbets ==
Order: Piciformes Family: Megalaimidae

Common name	Binomial	Picture
Fire-tufted barbet	Psilopogon pyrolophus	
Gold-whiskered barbet	Psilopogon chrysopogon	
Red-crowned barbet	Psilopogon rafflesii	
Red-throated barbet	Psilopogon mystacophanos	
Black-browed barbet	Psilopogon oorti	
Yellow-crowned barbet	Psilopogon henricii	
Black-eared barbet	Psilopogon duvaucelii	
Coppersmith barbet	Psilopogon haemacephalus	
Sooty barbet	Caloramphus hayii	

== Honeyguides ==
Order: Piciformes Family: Indicatoridae

Common name	Binomial	Picture
Malaysian honeyguide	Indicator archipelagicus	

== Woodpeckers and allies ==
Order: Piciformes Family: Picidae

Common name	Binomial	Picture
Speckled piculet	Picumnus innominatus	
Rufous piculet	Sasia abnormis	
Sunda pygmy woodpecker	Yungipicus moluccensis	
Grey-capped pygmy woodpecker	Yungipicus canicapillus	
Freckle-breasted woodpecker	Dendrocopos analis	
Rufous woodpecker	Micropternus brachyurus	
White-bellied woodpecker	Dryocopus javensis	
Banded woodpecker	Chrysophlegma mineaceus	
Greater yellownape	Chrysophlegma flavinucha	
Lesser yellownape	Picus chlorolophus	
Crimson-winged woodpecker	Picus puniceus	
Laced woodpecker	Picus vittatus	
Sumatran woodpecker	Picus dedemi	
Olive-backed woodpecker	Dinopium rafflesii	
Common flameback	Dinopium javanense	
Greater flameback	Chrysocolaptes guttacristatus	
Maroon woodpecker	Blythipicus rubiginosus	
Orange-backed woodpecker	Reinwardtipicus validus	
Buff-rumped woodpecker	Meiglyptes grammithorax	
Buff-necked woodpecker	Meiglyptes tukki	
Grey-and-buff woodpecker	Hemicircus sordidus	
Great slaty woodpecker	Mulleripicus pulverulentus	

== Old world parrots ==
Order: Psittaciformes Family: Psittaculidae

Common name	Binomial	Picture
Blue-rumped parrot	Psittinus cyanurus	
Red-breasted parakeet	Psittacula alexandri	
Long-tailed parakeet	Psittacula longicauda	
Blue-crowned hanging parrot	Loriculus galgulus	

== Asian and Grauer's broadbills ==
Order: Passeriformes Family: Eurylaimidae

Common name	Binomial	Picture
Dusky broadbill	Corydon sumatranus	
Black-and-red broadbill	Cymbirhynchus macrorhynchos	
Black-and-yellow broadbill	Eurylaimus ochromalus	
Long-tailed broadbill	Psarisomus dalhousiae	
Silver-breasted broadbill	Serilophus lunatus	

== African and green broadbills ==
Order: Passeriformes Family: Calyptomenidae

Common name	Binomial	Picture
Green broadbill	Calyptomena viridis	

== Pittas ==
Order: Passeriformes Family: Pittidae

Common name	Binomial	Picture
Giant pitta	Hydrornis caeruleus	
Malayan banded pitta	Hydrornis irena	
Schneider's pitta	Hydrornis schneideri	
Garnet pitta	Erythropitta granatina	
Graceful pitta	Erythropitta venusta	
Hooded pitta	Pitta sordida	
Blue-winged pitta	Pitta moluccensis	

== Thornbills and allies ==
Order: Passeriformes Family: Acanthizidae

Common name	Binomial	Picture
Golden-bellied gerygone	Gerygone sulphurea	

== Woodshrikes ==
Order: Passeriformes Family: Vangidae

Common name	Binomial	Picture
Large woodshrike	Tephrodornis virgatus	
Rufous-winged philentoma	Philentoma pyrhopterum	
Maroon-breasted philentoma	Philentoma velatum	
Bar-winged flycatcher-shrike	Hemipus picatus	
Black-winged flycatcher-shrike	Hemipus hirundinaceus	

== Woodswallows ==
Order: Passeriformes Family: Artamidae

Common name	Binomial	Picture
White-breasted woodswallow	Artamus leucorynchus	

== Ioras ==
Order: Passeriformes Family: Aegithinidae

Common name	Binomial	Picture
Common iora	Aegithina tiphia	
Green iora	Aegithina viridissima	

== Cuckooshrikes ==
Order: Passeriformes Family: Campephagidae

Common name	Binomial	Picture
Sunda cuckooshrike	Coracina larvata	
Bar-bellied cuckooshrike	Coracina striata	
Lesser cuckooshrike	Coracina fimbriata	
Pied triller	Lalage nigra	
Ashy minivet	Pericrocotus divaricatus	
Fiery minivet	Pericrocotus igneus	
Scarlet minivet	Pericrocotus flammeus	
Sunda minivet	Pericrocotus miniatus	

== Whistlers and allies ==
Order: Passeriformes Family: Pachycephalidae

Common name	Binomial	Picture
Mangrove whistler	Pachycephala cinerea	

== Crested shrikejay ==
Order: Passeriformes Family: Platylophidae

Common name	Binomial	Picture
Crested jay	Platylophus galericulatus	

== Shrikes ==
Order: Passeriformes Family: Laniidae

Common name	Binomial	Picture
Tiger shrike	Lanius tigrinus	
Brown shrike	Lanius cristatus	
Long-tailed shrike	Lanius schach	

== Vireos ==
Order: Passeriformes Family: Vireonidae

Common name	Binomial	Picture
White-browed shrike-babbler	Pteruthius aeralatus	
White-bellied erpornis	Erpornis zantholeuca	

== Old World orioles ==
Order: Passeriformes Family: Oriolidae

Common name	Binomial	Picture
Dark-throated oriole	Oriolus xanthonotus	
Black-naped oriole	Oriolus chinensis	
Black-hooded oriole	Oriolus xanthornus	

== Drongos ==
Order: Passeriformes Family: Dicruridae

Common name	Binomial	Picture
Ashy drongo	Dicrurus leucophaeus	
Crow-billed drongo	Dicrurus annectens	
Bronzed drongo	Dicrurus aeneus	
Lesser racket-tailed drongo	Dicrurus remifer	
Greater racket-tailed drongo	Dicrurus paradiseus	
Sumatran drongo	Dicrurus sumatranus	

== Fantails ==
Order: Passeriformes Family: Rhipiduridae

Common name	Binomial	Picture
White-throated fantail	Rhipidura albicollis	
Pied fantail	Rhipidura javanica	
Spotted fantail	Rhipidura perlata	

== Monarch flycatchers ==
Order: Passeriformes Family: Monarchidae

Common name	Binomial	Picture
Black-naped monarch	Hypothymis azurea	
Japanese paradise flycatcher	Terpsiphone atrocaudata	
Oriental paradise flycatcher	Terpsiphone affinis	

== Crows, jays, ravens and magpies ==
Order: Passeriformes Family: Corvidae

Common name	Binomial	Picture
Black magpie	Platysmurus leucopterus	
Common green magpie	Cissa chinensis	
Sumatran treepie	Dendrocitta occipitalis	
Slender-billed crow	Corvus enca	
Large-billed crow	Corvus macrorhynchos	

== Rail-babbler ==
Order: Passeriformes Family: Eupetidae

Common name	Binomial	Picture
Malaysian rail-babbler	Eupetes macrocerus	

== Swallows ==
Order: Passeriformes Family: Hirundinidae

Common name	Binomial	Picture
Barn swallow	Hirundo rustica	
Pacific swallow	Hirundo tahitica	
Red-rumped swallow	Cecropis daurica	
Striated swallow	Cecropis striolata	
Asian house-martin	Delichon dasypus	

== Fairy flycatchers ==
Order: Passeriformes Family: Stenostiridae

Common name	Binomial	Picture
Grey-headed canary-flycatcher	Culicicapa ceylonensis	

== Chickadees and titmice ==
Order: Passeriformes Family: Paridae

Common name	Binomial	Picture
Cinereous tit	Parus cinereus	

== Nuthatches ==
Order: Passeriformes Family: Sittidae

Common name	Binomial	Picture
Velvet-fronted nuthatch	Sitta frontalis	
Blue nuthatch	Sitta azurea	

== Bulbuls ==
Order: Passeriformes Family: Pycnonotidae

Common name	Binomial	Picture
Black-and-white bulbul	Brachypodius melanoleucus	
Black-headed bulbul	Brachypodius melanocephalos	
Puff-backed bulbul	Brachypodius eutilotus	
Straw-headed bulbul	Pycnonotus zeylanicus	
Blue-wattled bulbul	Pycnonotus nieuwenhuisii	
Aceh bulbul	Pycnonotus snouckaerti	
Yellow-vented bulbul	Pycnonotus goiavier	
Olive-winged bulbul	Pycnonotus plumosus	
Cream-vented bulbul	Pycnonotus simplex	
Red-eyed bulbul	Pycnonotus brunneus	
Cream-striped bulbul	Pycnonotus leucogrammicus	
Spot-necked bulbul	Pycnonotus tympanistrigus	
Orange-spotted bulbul	Pycnonotus bimaculatus	
Red-whiskered bulbul	Pycnonotus jocosus	
Sooty-headed bulbul	Pycnonotus aurigaster	
Ruby-throated bulbul	Rubigula dispar	
Scaly-breasted bulbul	Rubigula squamatus	
Grey-bellied bulbul	Rubigula cyaniventris	
Spectacled bulbul	Rubigula erythropthalmos	
Finsch's bulbul	Alophoixus finschii	
Ochraceous bulbul	Alophoixus ochraceus	
Gray-cheeked bulbul	Alophoixus tephrogenys	
Yellow-bellied bulbul	Alophoixus phaeocephalus	
Hook-billed bulbul	Setornis criniger	
Hairy-backed bulbul	Tricholestes criniger	
Buff-vented bulbul	Iole crypta	
Cinereous bulbul	Hemixos cinereus	
Streaked bulbul	Ixos malaccensis	
Sunda bulbul	Ixos virescens	

== Cupwings ==
Order: Passeriformes Family: Pnoepygidae

Common name	Binomial	Picture
Pygmy wren-babbler	Pnoepyga pusilla	

== Bush warblers and allies ==
Order: Passeriformes Family: Scotocercidae

Common name	Binomial	Picture
Aberrant bush warbler	Horornis flavolivaceus	
Mountain tailorbird	Phyllergates cuculatus	
Yellow-bellied warbler	Abroscopus superciliaris	

== Phylloscopid warblers ==
Order: Passeriformes Family: Phylloscopidae

Common name	Binomial	Picture
Arctic warbler	Phylloscopus borealis	
Eastern crowned warbler	Phylloscopus coronatus	
Mountain leaf warbler	Phylloscopus trivirgatus	
Chestnut-crowned warbler	Phylloscopus castaniceps	
Yellow-breasted warbler	Phylloscopus montis	

== Acrocephalid warblers ==
Order: Passeriformes Family: Acrocephalidae

Common name	Binomial	Picture
Black-browed reed warbler	Acrocephalus bistrigiceps	
Oriental reed warbler	Acrocephalus orientalis	

== Locustellid warblers ==
Order: Passeriformes Family: Locustellidae

Common name	Binomial	Picture
Lanceolated warbler	Locustella lanceolata	
Pallas's grasshopper warbler	Locustella certhiola	

== Cisticolas and allies ==
Order: Passeriformes Family: Cisticolidae

Common name	Binomial	Picture
Zitting cisticola	Cisticola juncidis	
Golden-headed cisticola	Cisticola exilis	
Hill prinia	Prinia superciliaris	
Bar-winged prinia	Prinia familiaris	
Yellow-bellied prinia	Prinia flaviventris	
Dark-necked tailorbird	Orthotomus atrogularis	
Rufous-tailed tailorbird	Orthotomus sericeus	
Ashy tailorbird	Orthotomus ruficeps	

== White-eyes ==
Order: Passeriformes Family: Zosteropidae

Common name	Binomial	Picture
Sangkar white-eye	Zosterops melanurus	
Swinhoe's white-eye	Zosterops simplex	
Warbling white-eye	Zosterops japonicus	
Black-capped white-eye	Zosterops atricapilla	

== Tree-babblers, scimitar-babblers, and allies ==
Order: Passeriformes Family: Timaliidae

Common name	Binomial	Picture
Sunda scimitar-babbler	Pomatorhinus bornensis	
Gray-throated babbler	Stachyris nigriceps	
Gray-headed babbler	Stachyris poliocephala	
White-necked babbler	Stachyris leucotis	
White-bibbed babbler	Stachyris thoracica	
Black-throated babbler	Stachyris nigricollis	
Chestnut-rumped babbler	Stachyris maculata	
Spot-necked babbler	Stachyris strialata	
Chestnut-winged babbler	Cyanoderma erythropterum	
Rufous-fronted babbler	Cyanoderma rufifrons	
Golden babbler	Cyanoderma chrysaea	
Pin-striped tit-babbler	Mixornis gularis	
Bold-striped tit-babbler	Mixornis bornensis	
Fluffy-backed tit-babbler	Macronus ptilosus	

== Ground babblers ==
Order: Passeriformes Family: Pellorneidae

Common name	Binomial	Picture
Abbott's babbler	Malacocincla abbotti	
Horsfield's babbler	Malacocincla sepiaria	
Large wren-babbler	Turdinus macrodactylus	
Marbled wren-babbler	Turdinus marmoratus	
Rusty-breasted wren-babbler	Gypsophila rufipectus	
Eyebrowed wren-babbler	Napothera epilepidota	
Sumatran wren-babbler	Napothera albostriata	
Bornean wren-babbler	Ptilocichla leucogrammica	
Black-capped babbler	Pellorneum capistratum	
Buff-breasted babbler	Pellorneum tickelli	
Sumatran babbler	Pellorneum buettikoferi	
Temminck's babbler	Pellorneum pyrrogenys	
Short-tailed babbler	Pellorneum malaccense	
White-chested babbler	Pellorneum rostratum	
Ferruginous babbler	Pellorneum bicolor	
Moustached babbler	Malacopteron magnirostre	
Sooty-capped babbler	Malacopteron affine	
Scaly-crowned babbler	Malacopteron cinereum	
Rufous-crowned babbler	Malacopteron magnum	
Grey-breasted babbler	Malacopteron albogulare	
Striped wren-babbler	Kenopia striata	

== Laughingthrushes ==
Order: Passeriformes Family: Leiothrichidae

Common name	Binomial	Picture
Brown fulvetta	Alcippe brunneicauda	
Sunda laughingthrush	Garrulax palliatus	
Sumatran laughingthrush	Garrulax bicolor	
Black laughingthrush	Melanocichla lugubris	
Chestnut-capped laughingthrush	Pterorhinus mitratus	
Long-tailed sibia	Heterophasia picaoides	
Silver-eared mesia	Leiothrix argentauris	

== Fairy-bluebirds ==
Order: Passeriformes Family: Irenidae

Common name	Binomial	Picture
Asian fairy-bluebird	Irena puella	

== Old World flycatchers ==
Order: Passeriformes Family: Muscicapidae

Common name	Binomial	Picture
Blue rock-thrush	Monticola solitarius	
Shiny whistling-thrush	Myophonus melanurus	
Sumatran whistling-thrush	Myophonus castaneus	
Blue whistling-thrush	Myophonus caeruleus	
Lesser shortwing	Brachypteryx leucophrys	
Sumatran shortwing	Brachypteryx saturata	
Gray-streaked flycatcher	Muscicapa griseisticta	
Dark-sided flycatcher	Muscicapa sibirica	
Asian brown flycatcher	Muscicapa dauurica	
Brown-streaked flycatcher	Muscicapa williamsoni	
Ferruginous flycatcher	Muscicapa ferruginea	
Yellow-rumped flycatcher	Ficedula zanthopygia	
Mugimaki flycatcher	Ficedula mugimaki	
Snowy-browed flycatcher	Ficedula hyperythra	
Rufous-chested flycatcher	Ficedula dumetoria	
Little pied flycatcher	Ficedula westermanni	
Pygmy flycatcher	Ficedula hodgsoni	
Rufous-browed flycatcher	Anthipes solitaris	
Blue-and-white flycatcher	Cyanoptila cyanomelana	
Zappey's flycatcher	Cyanoptila cumatilis	
Indigo flycatcher	Eumyias indigo	
Verditer flycatcher	Eumyias thalassina	
Large niltava	Niltava grandis	
Rufous-vented niltava	Niltava sumatrana	
White-tailed flycatcher	Cyornis concretus	
Rück's blue flycatcher	Cyornis ruckii	
Pale blue flycatcher	Cyornis unicolor	
Sunda blue flycatcher	Cyornis caerulatus	
Malaysian blue flycatcher	Cyornis turcosus	
Bornean blue flycatcher	Cyornis superbus	
Indochinese blue flycatcher	Cyornis sumatrensis	
Gray-chested jungle-flycatcher	Cyornis umbratilis	
Fulvous-chested jungle-flycatcher	Cyornis olivaceus	
Mangrove blue flycatcher	Cyornis rufigastra	
Sulawesi blue flycatcher	Cyornis omissus	
Siberian blue robin	Larvivora cyane	
Oriental magpie-robin	Copsychus saularis	
White-rumped shama	Copsychus malabaricus	
Rufous-tailed shama	Copsychus pyrropyga	
Chestnut-naped forktail	Enicurus ruficapillus	
Sunda forktail	Enicurus velatus	
White-crowned forktail	Enicurus leschenaulti	
Sunda robin	Myiomela diana	
Siberian stonechat	Saxicola maurus	
Amur stonechat	Saxicola stejnegeri	
Pied bushchat	Saxicola caprata	

== Thrushes and allies ==
Order: Passeriformes Family: Turdidae

Common name	Binomial	Picture
Siberian thrush	Geokichla sibirica	
Chestnut-capped thrush	Geokichla interpres	
Enggano thrush	Geokichla leucolaema	
Sunda thrush	Zoothera andromedae	
Tasman Sea island thrush	Turdus poliocephalus	
Eyebrowed thrush	Turdus obscurus	
Sumatran cochoa	Cochoa beccarii	

== Starlings ==
Order: Passeriformes Family: Sturnidae

Common name	Binomial	Picture
Asian glossy starling	Aplonis panayensis	
Common hill myna	Gracula religiosa	
Enggano myna	Gracula enganensis	
Nias myna	Gracula robusta	
Daurian starling	Agropsar sturnina	

== Leafbirds ==
Order: Passeriformes Family: Chloropseidae

Common name	Binomial	Picture
Greater green leafbird	Chloropsis sonnerati	
Lesser green leafbird	Chloropsis cyanopogon	
Sumatran leafbird	Chloropsis media	
Blue-masked leafbird	Chloropsis venusta	

== Flowerpeckers ==
Order: Passeriformes Family: Dicaeidae

Common name	Binomial	Picture
Yellow-breasted flowerpecker	Prionochilus maculatus	
Crimson-breasted flowerpecker	Prionochilus percussus	
Scarlet-breasted flowerpecker	Prionochilus thoracicus	
Thick-billed flowerpecker	Dicaeum agile	
Brown-backed flowerpecker	Dicaeum everetti	
Yellow-vented flowerpecker	Dicaeum chrysorrheum	
Orange-bellied flowerpecker	Dicaeum trigonostigma	
Plain flowerpecker	Dicaeum minullum	
Scarlet-backed flowerpecker	Dicaeum cruentatum	
Scarlet-headed flowerpecker	Dicaeum trochileum	

== Sunbirds and spiderhunters ==
Order: Passeriformes Family: Nectariniidae

Common name	Binomial	Picture
Ruby-cheeked sunbird	Chalcoparia singalensis	
Plain sunbird	Anthreptes simplex	
Brown-throated sunbird	Anthreptes malacensis	
Red-throated sunbird	Anthreptes rhodolaemus	
Purple-naped sunbird	Kurochkinegramma hypogrammicum	
Copper-throated sunbird	Leptocoma calcostetha	
Van Hasselt's sunbird	Leptocoma brasiliana	
Olive-backed sunbird	Cinnyris jugularis	
Crimson sunbird	Aethopyga siparaja	
Temminck's sunbird	Aethopyga temminckii	
Thick-billed spiderhunter	Arachnothera crassirostris	
Spectacled spiderhunter	Arachnothera flavigaster	
Long-billed spiderhunter	Arachnothera robusta	
Little spiderhunter	Arachnothera longirostra	
Yellow-eared spiderhunter	Arachnothera chrysogenys	
Grey-breasted spiderhunter	Arachnothera modesta	

== Wagtails and pipits ==
Order: Passeriformes Family: Motacillidae

Common name	Binomial	Picture
Forest wagtail	Dendronanthus indicus	
Gray wagtail	Motacilla cinerea	
Western yellow wagtail	Motacilla flava	
Eastern yellow wagtail	Motacilla tschutschensis	
Richard's pipit	Anthus richardi	
Paddyfield pipit	Anthus rufulus	
Pechora pipit	Anthus gustavi	

== Finches, euphonias, and allies ==
Order: Passeriformes Family: Fringillidae

Common name	Binomial	Picture
Mountain serin	Chrysocorythus estherae	

== Old World sparrows ==
Order: Passeriformes Family: Passeridae

Common name	Binomial	Picture
Eurasian tree sparrow	Passer montanus	

== Weavers and allies ==
Order: Passeriformes Family: Ploceidae

Common name	Binomial	Picture
Baya weaver	Ploceus philippinus	
Asian golden weaver	Ploceus hypoxanthus	

== Waxbills and allies ==
Order: Passeriformes Family: Estrildidae

Common name	Binomial	Picture
Pin-tailed parrotfinch	Erythrura prasina	
White-rumped munia	Lonchura striata	
Scaly-breasted munia	Lonchura punctulata	
White-bellied munia	Lonchura leucogastra	
Javan munia	Lonchura leucogastroides	
Chestnut munia	Lonchura atricapilla	
White-headed munia	Lonchura maja	

== See also ==
- Fauna of Indonesia
