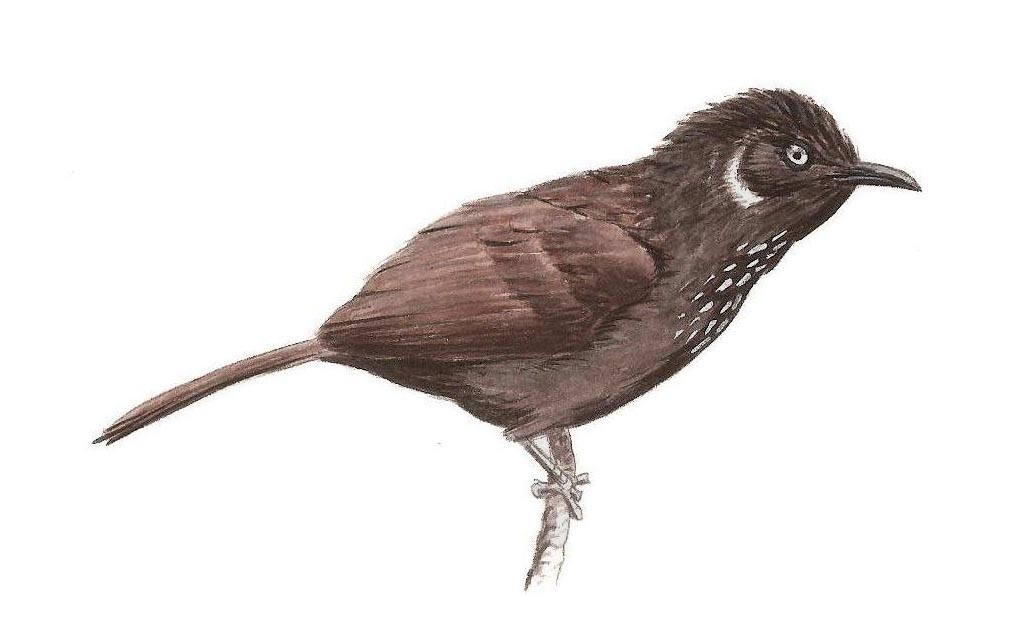

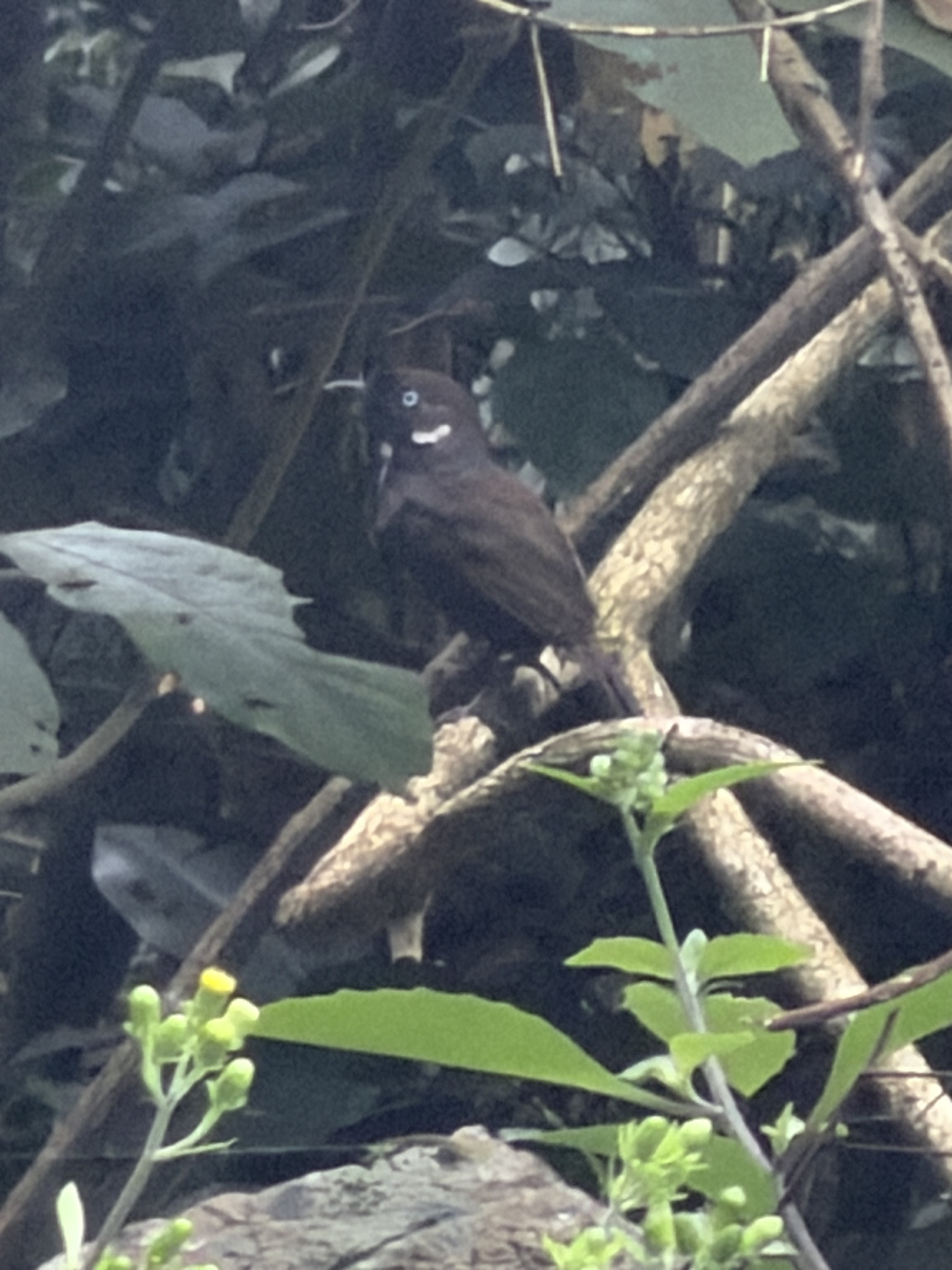

Conservation status
- Vulnerable (IUCN 3.1)

Scientific classification
- Kingdom: Animalia
- Phylum: Chordata
- Class: Aves
- Order: Passeriformes
- Family: Timaliidae
- Genus: Stachyris
- Species: S. nonggangensis

Binomial name
- Stachyris nonggangensis Zhou F & Jiang A, 2008

= Nonggang babbler =

Species of bird

The Nonggang babbler (Stachyris nonggangensis) is a recently described species of bird in the family Timaliidae.

This species was first observed by the ornithologists Zhou Fang and Jiang Aiwu while surveying the Nonggang Natural Reserve (弄岗自然保护区) in Guangxi, China, in February 2005. The type specimen was captured in January 2006, and the species was formally described in 2008.

In appearance it is similar to the sooty babbler (S. herberti), but differs in having a pale iris, a white crescent behind the ear, a white throat patch with black spots, and a black bill.

In general behaviour it resembles a wren-babbler of the genus Napothera in that it prefers running to flying, and seems to spend most of its time on the ground foraging for insects between rocks and under fallen leaves. Its natural habitat is karst seasonal rainforest that, following selective cutting, is dominated by Burretiodendron hsienmu. The known range is currently restricted to the Nonggang Natural Reserve, but since similar habitat also exists in northern Vietnam and southeast Yunnan, China, it is possible the species may also be found there.
