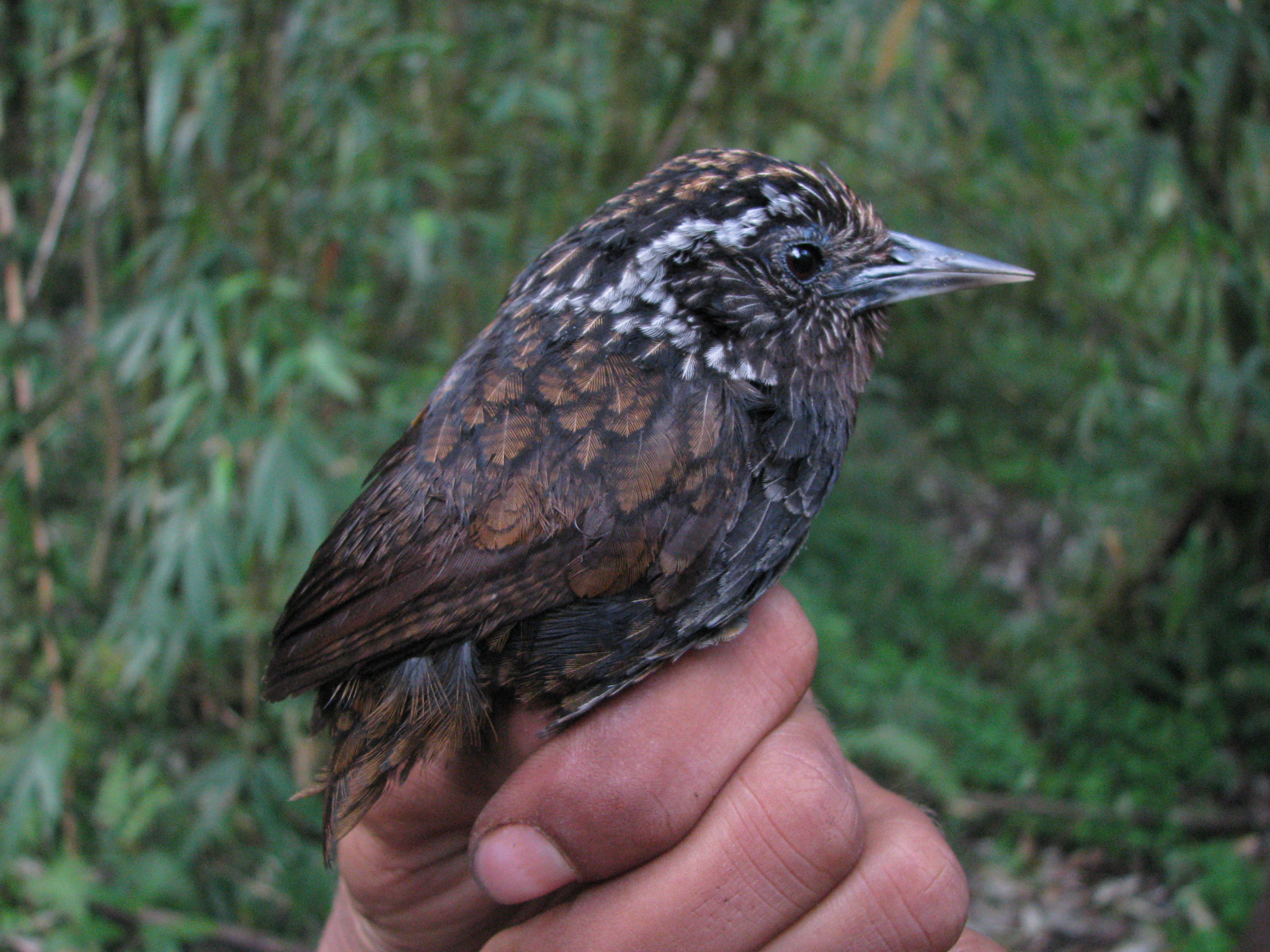

Conservation status
- Near Threatened (IUCN 3.1)

Scientific classification
- Kingdom: Animalia
- Phylum: Chordata
- Class: Aves
- Order: Passeriformes
- Family: Timaliidae
- Genus: Stachyris
- Species: S. humei

Binomial name
- Stachyris humei (Mandelli, 1873)

Synonyms
- Heterorhynchus humei protonym; Sphenocichla humei

= Sikkim wedge-billed babbler =

Species of bird

The Sikkim wedge-billed babbler or blackish-breasted babbler (Stachyris humei) is a species of bird in the Old World babbler family (Timaliidae). It is named for the Indian state of Sikkim.

It is found in the Indian subcontinent and nearby parts of Southeast Asia. Its range includes Bhutan, India, Myanmar, and Nepal. Its natural habitats are subtropical or tropical moist lowland forests and subtropical or tropical moist montane forests. It is becoming rare due to habitat loss.

== Systematics ==
This species described by Louis Mandelli based on specimens from Sikkim and placed in the genus Heterorhynchus which was however preoccupied leading to it briefly being placed in the genus Stachyrirhynchus by Hume. However the genus Sphenocichla was erected before this by Godwin-Austen and Lord Tweeddale for the Manipur or Cachar wedge-billed babbler and this species was moved to the genus Sphenocichla. Molecular phylogenetic analysis indicated that the species in the genus Sphenocichla were nested amid species of Stachyris leading to them being merged into the older described genus Stachyris.

The species was previously known as the wedge-billed babbler and included Stachyris humei and the now separated Stachyris roberti which was earlier treated as a subspecies.

== Ecology ==
It inhabits the understorey of broadleaf evergreen forest and bamboo at 900–1,950 m, favouring westward facing slopes in Bhutan. It occupies lower elevations only during the winter. It occurs in small parties and feeds on insects, particularly woodlice and boring beetles.
