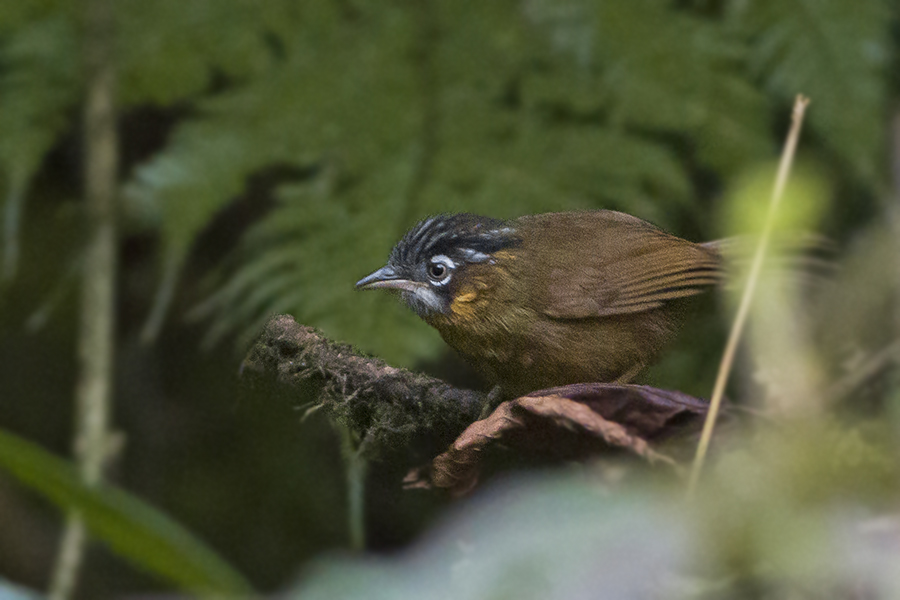
- Grey-throated babbler in Sikkim, India

Scientific classification
- Kingdom: Animalia
- Phylum: Chordata
- Class: Aves
- Order: Passeriformes
- Family: Timaliidae
- Genus: Stachyris; Hodgson, 1844

Type species
- Stachyris nigriceps Blyth, 1844

= Stachyris =

Genus of birds

Stachyris is a genus of passerine birds in the Old World babbler family, Timaliidae.

== Taxonomy ==
The genus Stachyris was introduced in 1844 in an article by the English zoologist Edward Blyth in which he quotes a diagnosis by Brian Houghton Hodgson. Hodgson designated the type species as the grey-throated babbler. The genus name combines the Ancient Greek stakhus, meaning "ear of wheat" and rhis, rhinos, meaning "nostrils".

== Species ==
The genus includes the following 13 species:

Image	Common name	Scientific name	Distribution
	White-breasted babbler	Stachyris grammiceps	island of Java in Indonesia
	Sooty babbler	Stachyris herberti	Laos and Vietnam
	Nonggang babbler	Stachyris nonggangensis	southwest China and north Vietnam
	Grey-throated babbler	Stachyris nigriceps	Himalayas of Nepal to south China, Vietnam, Sumatra and Borneo
	Grey-headed babbler	Stachyris poliocephala	Malay Peninsula, Sumatra and Borneo
	Spot-necked babbler	Stachyris strialata	east Myanmar to south China, Vietnam and Sumatra
	Snowy-throated babbler	Stachyris oglei	northeast India and Myanmar
	Chestnut-rumped babbler	Stachyris maculata	Malay Peninsula, Sumatra and satellites, and Borneo
	White-necked babbler	Stachyris leucotis	Malay Peninsula, Sumatra and Borneo
	Black-throated babbler	Stachyris nigricollis	Malay Peninsula, Sumatra and Borneo
	White-bibbed babbler	Stachyris thoracica	Bali and Java
	Sikkim wedge-billed babbler	Stachyris humei	Himalayas of India
	Cachar wedge-billed babbler	Stachyris roberti	northeast India to southwest China

For other former Stachyris species see under Cyanoderma, Sterrhoptilus and Zosterornis.
