= Snowy-throated babbler =

Conservation status
- Vulnerable (IUCN 3.1)

Scientific classification
- Kingdom: Animalia
- Phylum: Chordata
- Class: Aves
- Order: Passeriformes
- Family: Timaliidae
- Genus: Stachyris
- Species: S. oglei

Binomial name
- Stachyris oglei (Godwin-Austen, 1877)

Species of bird

The snowy-throated babbler (Stachyris oglei) is a species of bird in the family Timaliidae. It is found in mountains of far Northeast India, i.e. northeast Assam and southeast Arunachal Pradesh.

Its natural habitats are subtropical or tropical moist lowland forest and subtropical or tropical moist shrubland. It is threatened by habitat loss.

Blurry photo from Namdapha National Park
