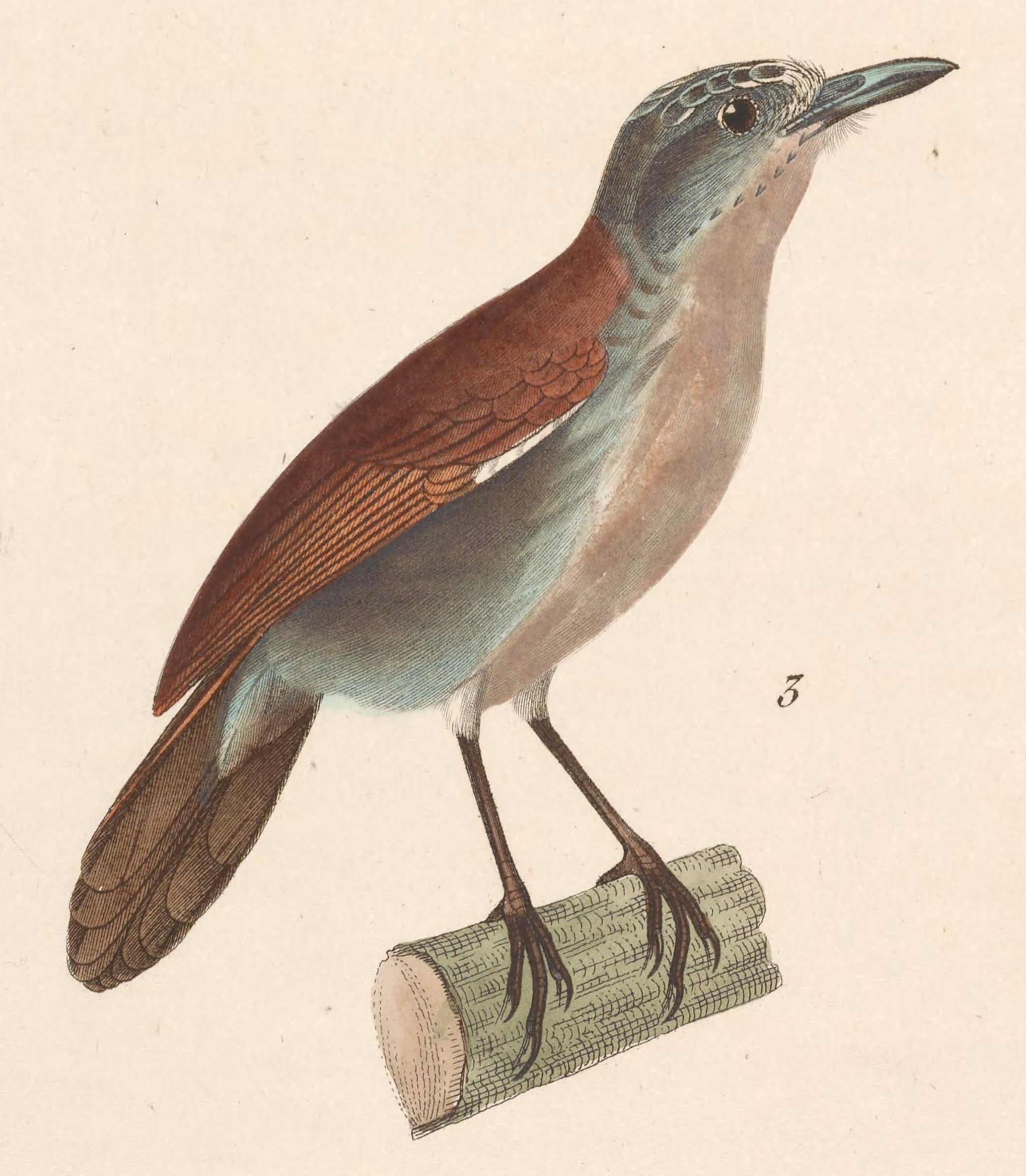

Conservation status
- Near Threatened (IUCN 3.1)

Scientific classification
- Kingdom: Animalia
- Phylum: Chordata
- Class: Aves
- Order: Passeriformes
- Family: Timaliidae
- Genus: Stachyris
- Species: S. grammiceps

Binomial name
- Stachyris grammiceps (Temminck, 1828)

= White-breasted babbler =

Species of bird

The white-breasted babbler (Stachyris grammiceps) is a species of bird in the family Timaliidae. It is endemic to the island of Java in Indonesia. Most records are from West Java.

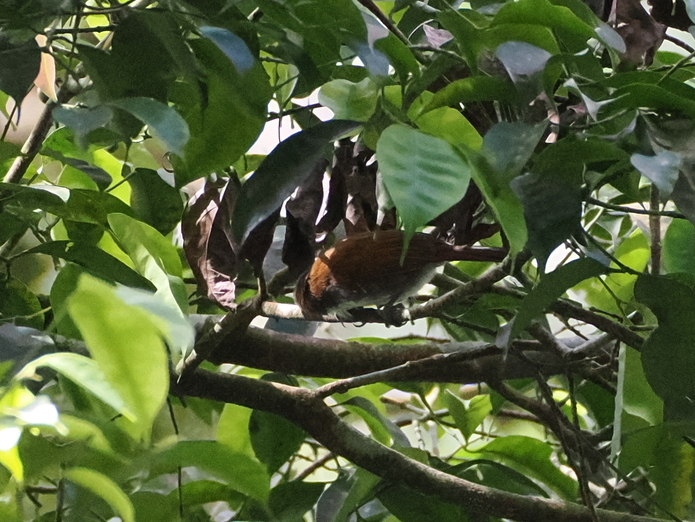
Live bird

Its natural habitat is subtropical or tropical moist lowland forest. It is threatened by habitat loss.
