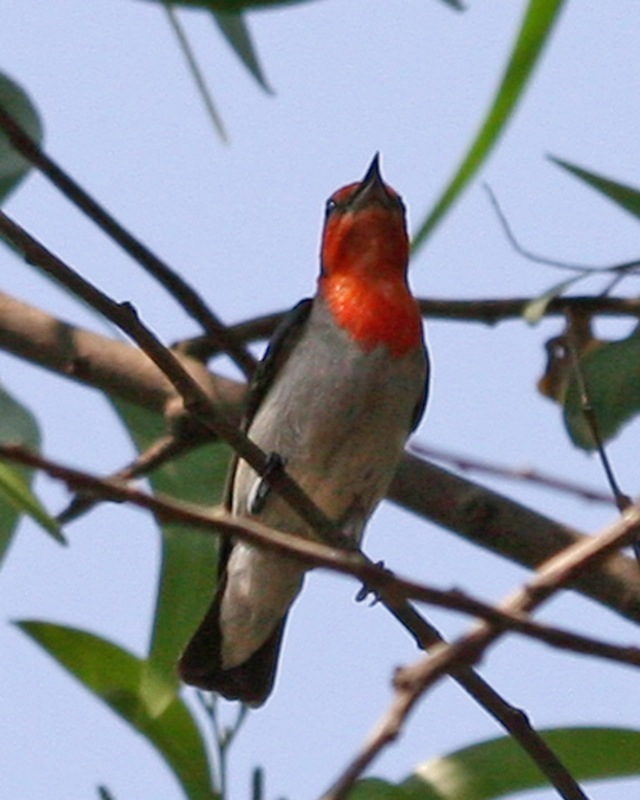

Conservation status
- Least Concern (IUCN 3.1)

Scientific classification
- Kingdom: Animalia
- Phylum: Chordata
- Class: Aves
- Order: Passeriformes
- Family: Dicaeidae
- Genus: Dicaeum
- Species: D. trochileum

Binomial name
- Dicaeum trochileum (Sparrman, 1789)

= Scarlet-headed flowerpecker =

Species of bird

The scarlet-headed flowerpecker (Dicaeum trochileum) is a bird species in the family of Dicaeidae. It is a species endemic to Indonesia. This flowerpecker inhabits a few islands of the archipelago of Indonesia. It is mainly observed in open wooden areas, gardens, and mangroves.

As of today, D. trochileum population is stable. The IUCN has classified its conservation status to Least Concern.

This species is not well studied.

== Description ==
The scarlet-headed flowerpecker body length can reach up to eight to nine centimeters after maturity.

The red to orange upper body of the males is the main characteristic that distinguishes them from the females. Their red plumage covers their head, their back, their rump and their throat. Their wings are black with blue pigmentation. Their legs are black, and their beak is grey. The tip of their tail is black.

The females have a light grey to brown head and back. Their orange to red rumps characterize the females' morphology. Similarly to the males, their legs are black, their beak is grey, and the tip of their tail is black. Their wings are lighter than the male's wings colour, and they are missing the blue coloration.

The morphology of the juveniles resembles more that of the females than that of the males. The small size and lighter body colours characterize the youngs. They have a light grey beak with pale brown wings and a pale grey to yellow belly.

== Taxonomy ==
This species is from the family Dicaeidae and in the genus Dicaeum. This genus was first named by George Cuvier, a French anatomist, in 1817. The species' name Dicaeum trochileum was given by Anders Sparrman in 1789.

== Distribution and habitat ==
The scarlet-headed flowerpecker is endemic to a few islands of the archipelago of Indonesia. It mainly inhabits the islands of Java and Bali. A few individuals have been reported on Lombok and Sumatra islands, and in Southeastern Borneo.

It mostly inhabits open woodlands, gardens and mangroves. This bird's presence has also been reported on the seacoast and in the lowlands of Sumatra Island. It is found between the sea level and up to a maximum of 600 meters in altitude.

Many tourists travel to the region of Taro on the island of Bali to observe this bird.

== Behavior ==
=== Vocalization ===
The scarlet-headed flowerpecker can be easily recognized by its call. It makes high and acute short notes. Its vocals are either a "zit-zit-zit" sound or "seeeeep…seeeeep". Every pitch last from two to three and a half seconds.

=== Diet ===
The scarlet-headed flowerpecker feeds mostly on small berries, insects, nectar and pollen. It is often seen in milkweed and mistletoe grooves, foraging the plants' berries. The aggressivity of this small bird allows it to perch low in trees and its small size helps it to move through the dense branches of the mistletoes to find its berries. It will forage either alone or with a partner.

=== Reproduction ===
The nest of this species is about 70–80 × 30–35 mm made from grass and leaves. Milkweed fibers have also been found in their nests. Their eggs are white, sometimes glossed and they have a dark red dot at one end. This flowerpecker lays the eggs in a large hole dug in the middle of the nests.

Both males and females are found in the nest, taking care of their chick together.

=== Moulting and breeding ===
There are individuals of scarlet-headed flowerpecker moulting all year round, but a higher number of individuals moult in July. The individuals calibrate their moulting with the abundance and quality of the food resources they can find.

The breeding season of this species changes depending on the island and the region each individual inhabits. In West Java, the breeding season extends from January to October whereas, in East and Central Java, it is generally from April to May.

== History ==
In 1938, the morphology of some unidentified bird species exhibited in the Buitenzorg Museum in Borneo was analyzed because of the similarities between their morphology, and that of the scarlet-headed flowerpecker and the sundanese flowerpecker (Dicaeum cruentatum). The unidentified bird species have been hypothesized to be a hybridization of these two flowerpeckers. The bird found have similarly colored underparts, wings and tails feathers as in both flowerpeckers. Its other morphological features are either similar to the scarlet-headed flowerpecker or to the Sundanese flowerpecker. An overlap of their habitat could explain how the two birds could have reproduced together.

== Conservation status ==
This species's conservation status is Least concern. The human presence and the noise disturbance affect this bird's activity during the day. This flowerpecker is more active in the morning when it is silent and deserted of human presence. However, those disturbances do not affect the population's reproduction and survival, making this species' population's number stable.
