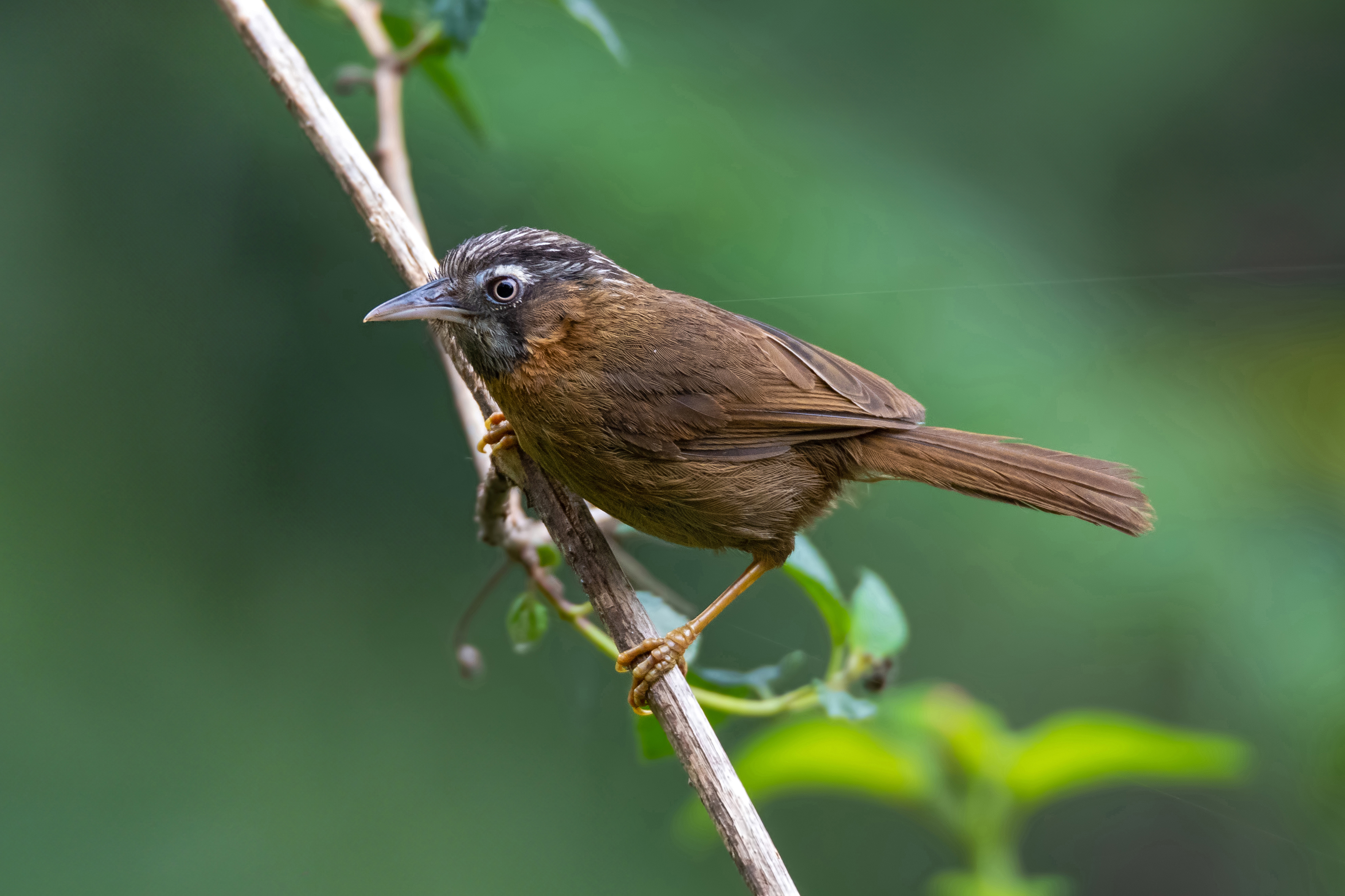
- Stachyris nigriceps nigriceps from Chitwan National Park, Nepal

Conservation status
- Least Concern (IUCN 3.1)

Scientific classification
- Kingdom: Animalia
- Phylum: Chordata
- Class: Aves
- Order: Passeriformes
- Family: Timaliidae
- Genus: Stachyris
- Species: S. nigriceps

Binomial name
- Stachyris nigriceps Blyth, 1844

= Grey-throated babbler =

Species of bird

The grey-throated babbler (Stachyris nigriceps) is a species of passerine bird in the Old World babbler family Timaliidae.

It is found in Bangladesh, Bhutan, China, India, Indonesia, Laos, Malaysia, Myanmar, Nepal, Thailand, and Vietnam. Its natural habitats are subtropical or tropical moist lowland forest and subtropical or tropical moist montane forest.

== Taxonomy ==
The grey-throated babbler was formally described in 1844 by the English zoologist Edward Blyth under the current binomial name Stachyris nigriceps. He specified the locality as Nepal. The genus name combines the Ancient Greek stakhus meaning "ear of wheat" and rhis, rhinos meaning "nostrils". The specific epithet nigriceps is from Latin niger meaning "black" and "-ceps" meaning "-headed".

Twelve subspecies are recognised:

- Stachyris nigriceps nigriceps Blyth, 1844 – central, east Himalayas
- Stachyris nigriceps coltarti Harington, 1913 – northeast India, north Myanmar and southwest China
- Stachyris nigriceps spadix Ripley, 1948 – east, south Assam (northeast India), east Bangladesh, south, southeast Myanmar and northwest, west Thailand
- Stachyris nigriceps yunnanensis La Touche, 1921 – east Myanmar, north Thailand and south China to north, central Indochina
- Stachyris nigriceps rileyi Chasen, 1936 – south Indochina
- Stachyris nigriceps dipora Oberholser, 1922 – north, central Malay Peninsula
- Stachyris nigriceps davisoni Sharpe, 1892 – south Malay Peninsula
- Stachyris nigriceps larvata (Bonaparte, 1850) – Sumatra and Lingga Island (east of central Sumatra)
- Stachyris nigriceps natunensis Hartert, EJO, 1894 – north Natuna Islands (northwest of Borneo)
- Stachyris nigriceps tionis Robinson & Kloss, 1927 – Tioman Island (off east Malay Peninsula)
- Stachyris nigriceps hartleyi Chasen, 1935 – montane west Borneo
- Stachyris nigriceps borneensis Sharpe, 1887 – montane north Borneo
