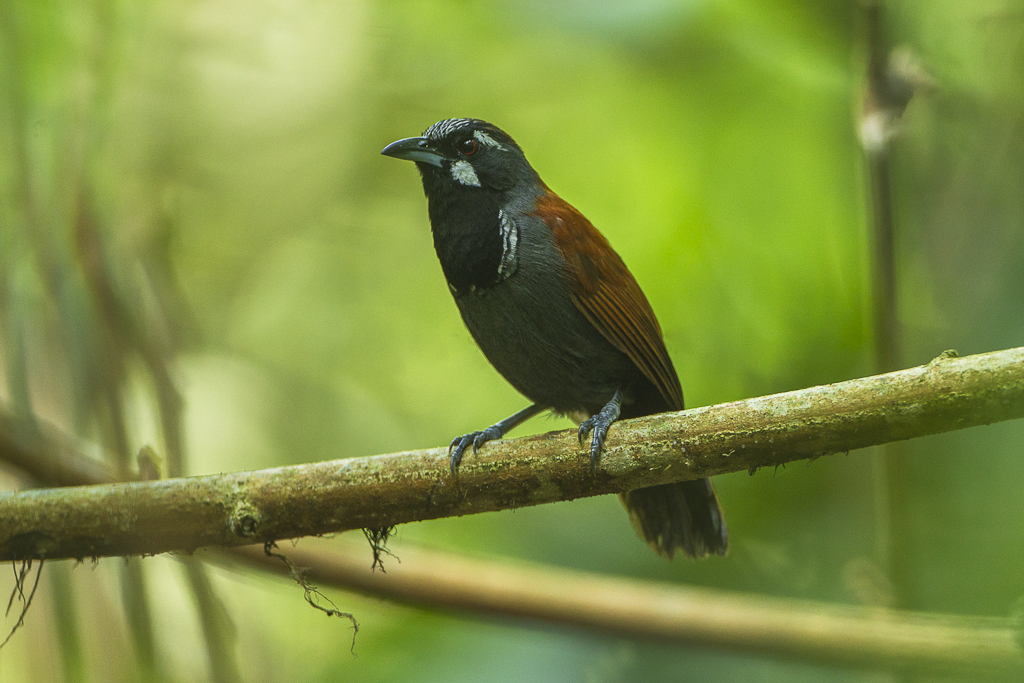

Conservation status
- Near Threatened (IUCN 3.1)

Scientific classification
- Kingdom: Animalia
- Phylum: Chordata
- Class: Aves
- Order: Passeriformes
- Family: Timaliidae
- Genus: Stachyris
- Species: S. nigricollis

Binomial name
- Stachyris nigricollis (Temminck, 1836)

= Black-throated babbler =

Species of bird

The black-throated babbler (Stachyris nigricollis) is a species of bird in the family Timaliidae. It is found in Brunei, Indonesia, Malaysia, Singapore, and Thailand. Its natural habitats are subtropical or tropical moist lowland forest and subtropical or tropical swampland. It is threatened by habitat loss.
