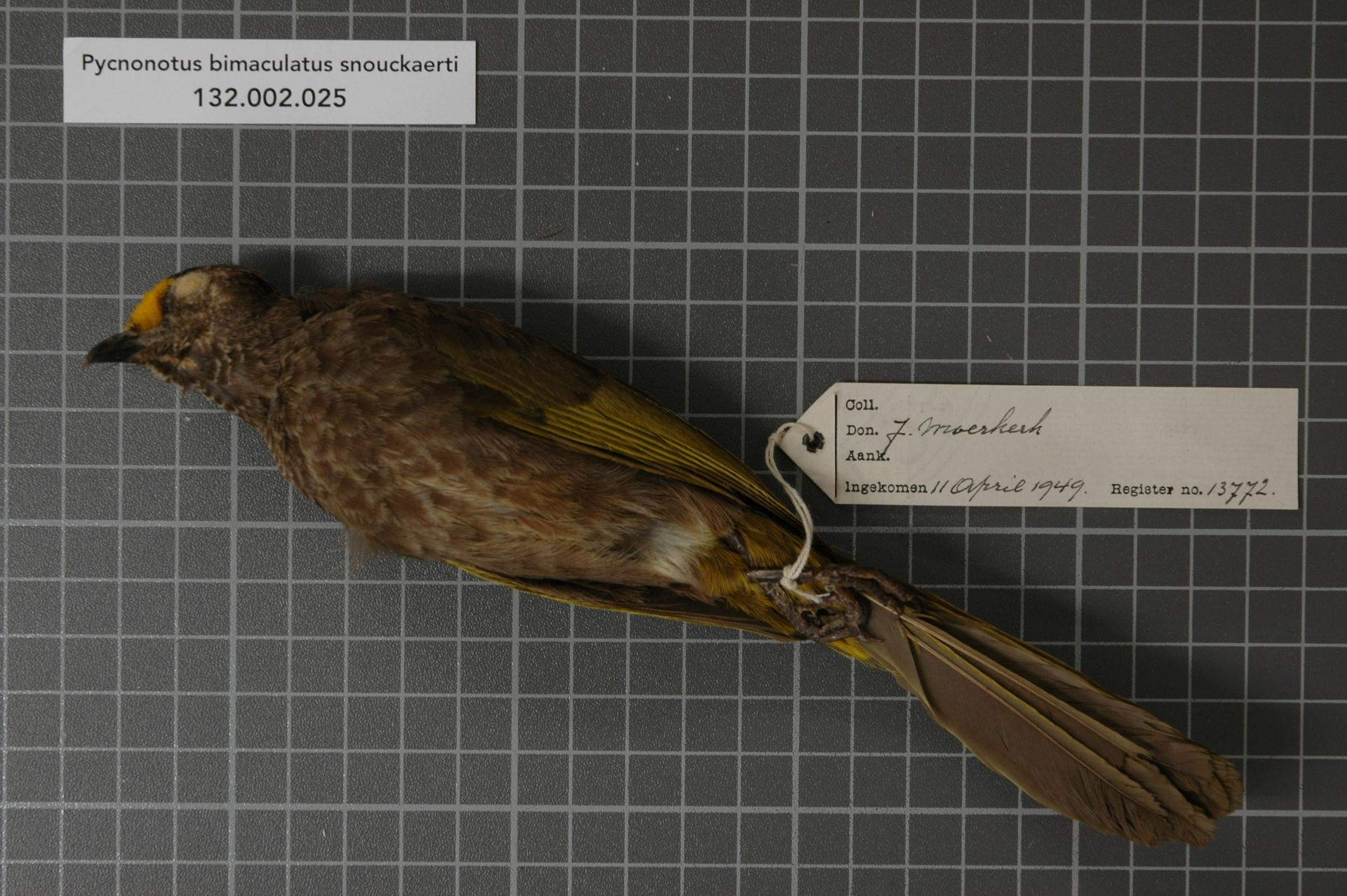
- preserved specimen

Conservation status
- Endangered (IUCN 3.1)

Scientific classification
- Kingdom: Animalia
- Phylum: Chordata
- Class: Aves
- Order: Passeriformes
- Family: Pycnonotidae
- Genus: Pycnonotus
- Species: P. snouckaerti

Binomial name
- Pycnonotus snouckaerti Siebers, 1928

Synonyms
- Pycnonotus bimaculatus snouckaerti

= Aceh bulbul =

Species of songbird

The Aceh bulbul (Pycnonotus snouckaerti) is a species of songbird in the bulbul family of passerine birds. It is found in the mountains of north-western Sumatra and is endemic to the island. Its natural habitat is tropical moist lowland forest.

== Taxonomy and systematics ==
The Aceh bulbul was formerly considered as a subspecies of the orange-spotted bulbul until split by the IOC in 2016.

== Description ==
The Aceh bulbul reaches an average length of 21 cm (8.3 in). The upperparts are mostly slaty-brown, with a noticeable olive-yellow wash to the wings. The face has two large, conspicuous orange tufts above the lores. The underparts are largely greyish-brown, with the light grey margins on the feathers of the breast giving a slightly scaly appearance. There is sometimes a whitish patch on the stomach, between the feet, while the vent is a dull yellow. The iris is red.

Compared to the orange-spotted bulbul, with which it was until recently considered conspecific, the Aceh bulbul has a much longer tail and wings, more prominent facial tufts, lores and ear-coverts that are the same colour as the remainder of the face (as opposed to orange-yellow), and much more restricted or no pale colouration on the underparts.

== Distribution and habitat ==
An Indonesian endemic, the Aceh bulbul is found only in the state of Aceh, on the northwestern portion of the island of Sumatra. It inhabits small glades in submontane forests where the vegetation is predominantly ferns and grasses. It is partial to elevations higher than 800 m (2,600 ft).
