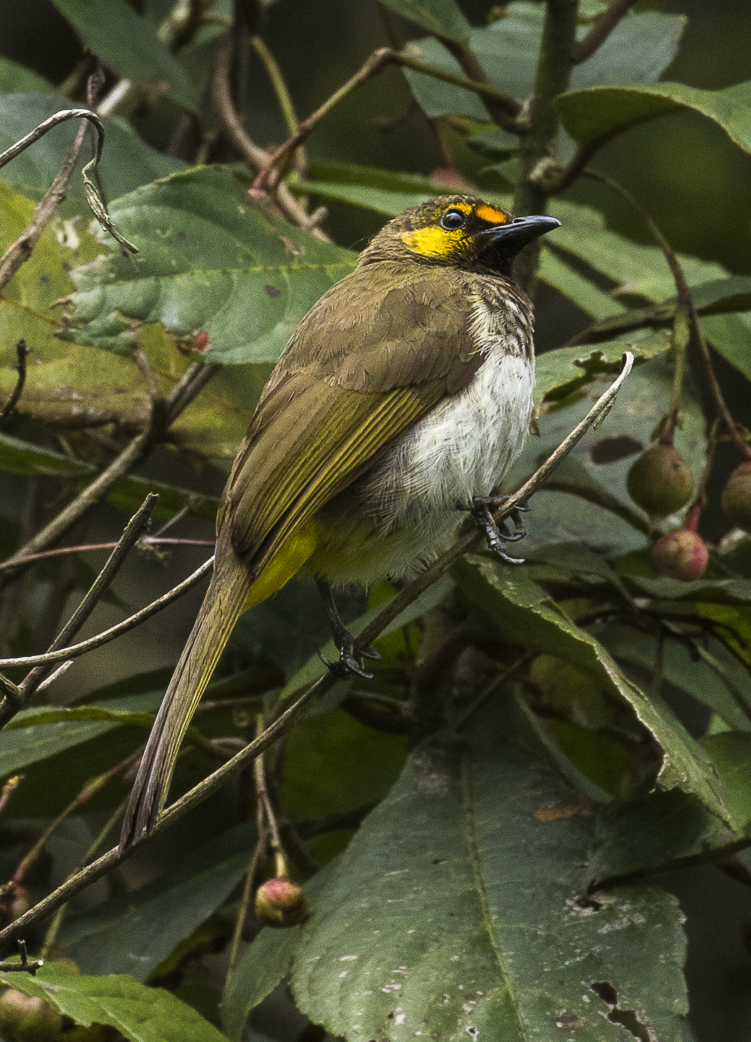

Conservation status
- Near Threatened (IUCN 3.1)

Scientific classification
- Kingdom: Animalia
- Phylum: Chordata
- Class: Aves
- Order: Passeriformes
- Family: Pycnonotidae
- Genus: Pycnonotus
- Species: P. bimaculatus

Binomial name
- Pycnonotus bimaculatus (Horsfield, 1821)
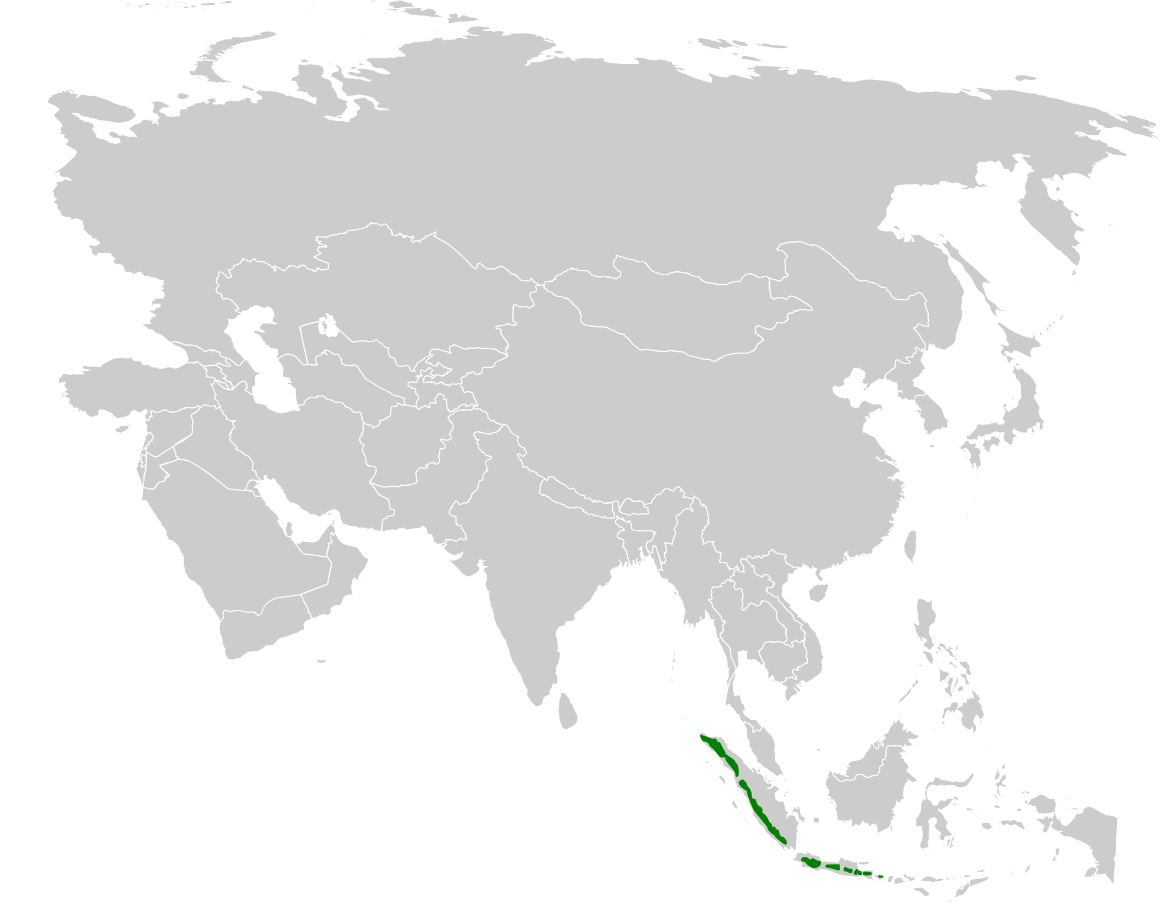

Synonyms
- Turdus bimaculatus

= Orange-spotted bulbul =

Species of songbird

The orange-spotted bulbul (Pycnonotus bimaculatus) is a species of songbird in the bulbul family of passerine birds. It is endemic to Java, Bali and Sumatra.

It favors forest edges and open meadows in montane forests.

== Taxonomy and systematics ==
The orange-spotted bulbul was originally described in the genus Turdus by Thomas Horsfield in 1821. Until 2016, the Aceh bulbul (Pycnonotus snouckaerti) was considered as a subspecies of the orange-spotted bulbul until split by the IOC. Most other authorities have not yet recognized this split.

=== Subspecies ===
Two subspecies are recognized:

- P. b. bimaculatus – (Horsfield, 1821): Found on south-western Sumatra, western and central Java
- P. b. tenggerensis – (van Oort, 1911): Found on eastern Java and Bali

== Description ==
The orange-spotted bulbul reaches an average length of 20 cm (7.9 in). The upperparts are brown, while the breast is a darker brown that mottles into a creamy white stomach. The head is blackish, darkest towards the front, and is marked by the light yellow ear coverts, an orange patch above the lores, and a yellowish-orange spot above the eyes. The vent is vivid yellow.

=== Calls ===
The orange-spotted bulbul makes a variety of loud calls and songs. It is a very vocal bird.

== Distribution and habitat ==
An Indonesian endemic, the orange-spotted bulbul is found natively only on the islands of Sumatra, Java, and Bali. It has also been introduced on Lombok. It inhabits forested habitats including primary forest, secondary forest, dwarf forests, and scrubland. It is known from elevations of 800–3,000 m (2,600–9,800 ft).

== Behaviour and ecology ==
The orange-spotted bulbul is a frugivore. The species is a continuous breeder, nesting throughout the year. On Java, breeding activity is highest during May. Its nests are robust and cup-shaped.
