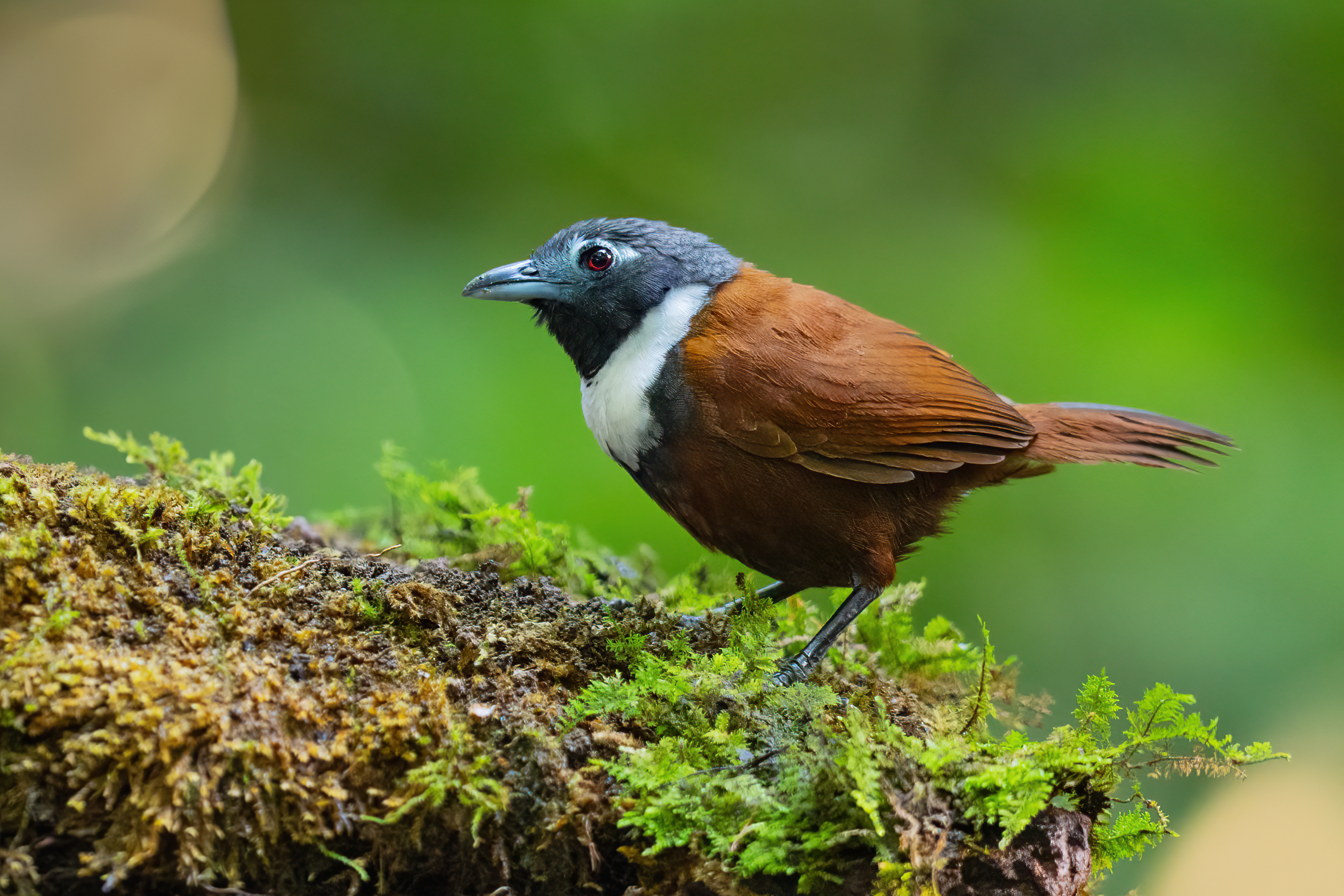
- subspecies oritentalis at Bromo Tengger Semeru National Park

Conservation status
- Least Concern (IUCN 3.1)

Scientific classification
- Kingdom: Animalia
- Phylum: Chordata
- Class: Aves
- Order: Passeriformes
- Family: Timaliidae
- Genus: Stachyris
- Species: S. thoracica

Binomial name
- Stachyris thoracica (Temminck, 1821)

= White-bibbed babbler =

Species of bird

The white-bibbed babbler (Stachyris thoracica) is a species of bird in the family Timaliidae. It is found in Bali and Java.

Its natural habitats are subtropical or tropical moist lowland forest and subtropical or tropical moist montane forest.
