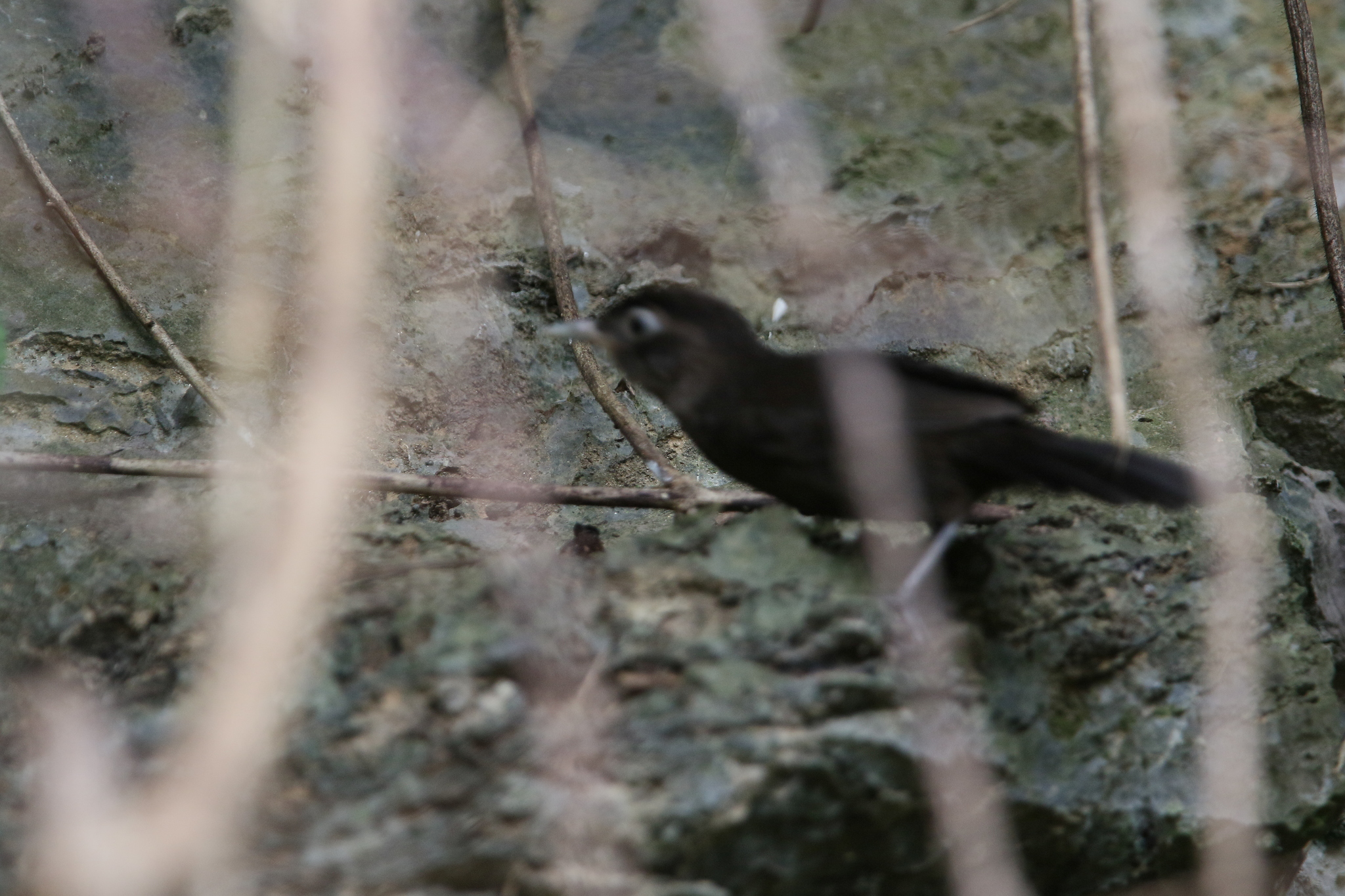

Conservation status
- Least Concern (IUCN 3.1)

Scientific classification
- Kingdom: Animalia
- Phylum: Chordata
- Class: Aves
- Order: Passeriformes
- Family: Timaliidae
- Genus: Stachyris
- Species: S. herberti

Binomial name
- Stachyris herberti (Baker, ECS, 1920)

= Sooty babbler =

Species of bird

The sooty babbler (Stachyris herberti) is a species of bird in the family Timaliidae. It is found in Laos and Vietnam. Its natural habitat is subtropical or tropical moist lowland forest. It is threatened by habitat loss.
