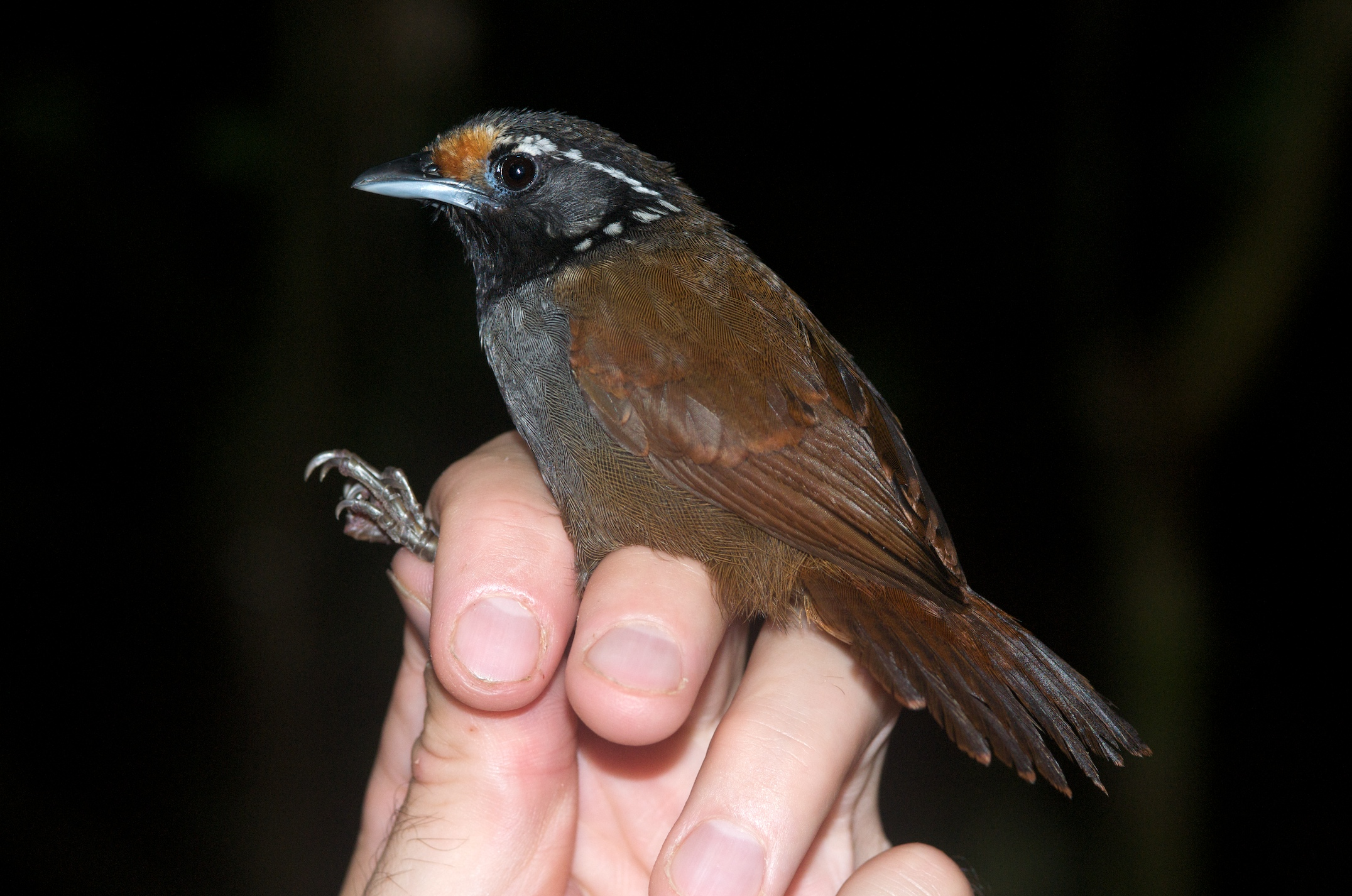

Conservation status
- Near Threatened (IUCN 3.1)

Scientific classification
- Kingdom: Animalia
- Phylum: Chordata
- Class: Aves
- Order: Passeriformes
- Family: Timaliidae
- Genus: Stachyris
- Species: S. leucotis

Binomial name
- Stachyris leucotis (Strickland, 1848)

= White-necked babbler =

Species of bird

The white-necked babbler (Stachyris leucotis) is a species of bird in the family Timaliidae. It is found in Brunei, Indonesia, Malaysia, and Thailand. Its natural habitat is subtropical or tropical moist lowland forest. It is threatened by habitat loss.
