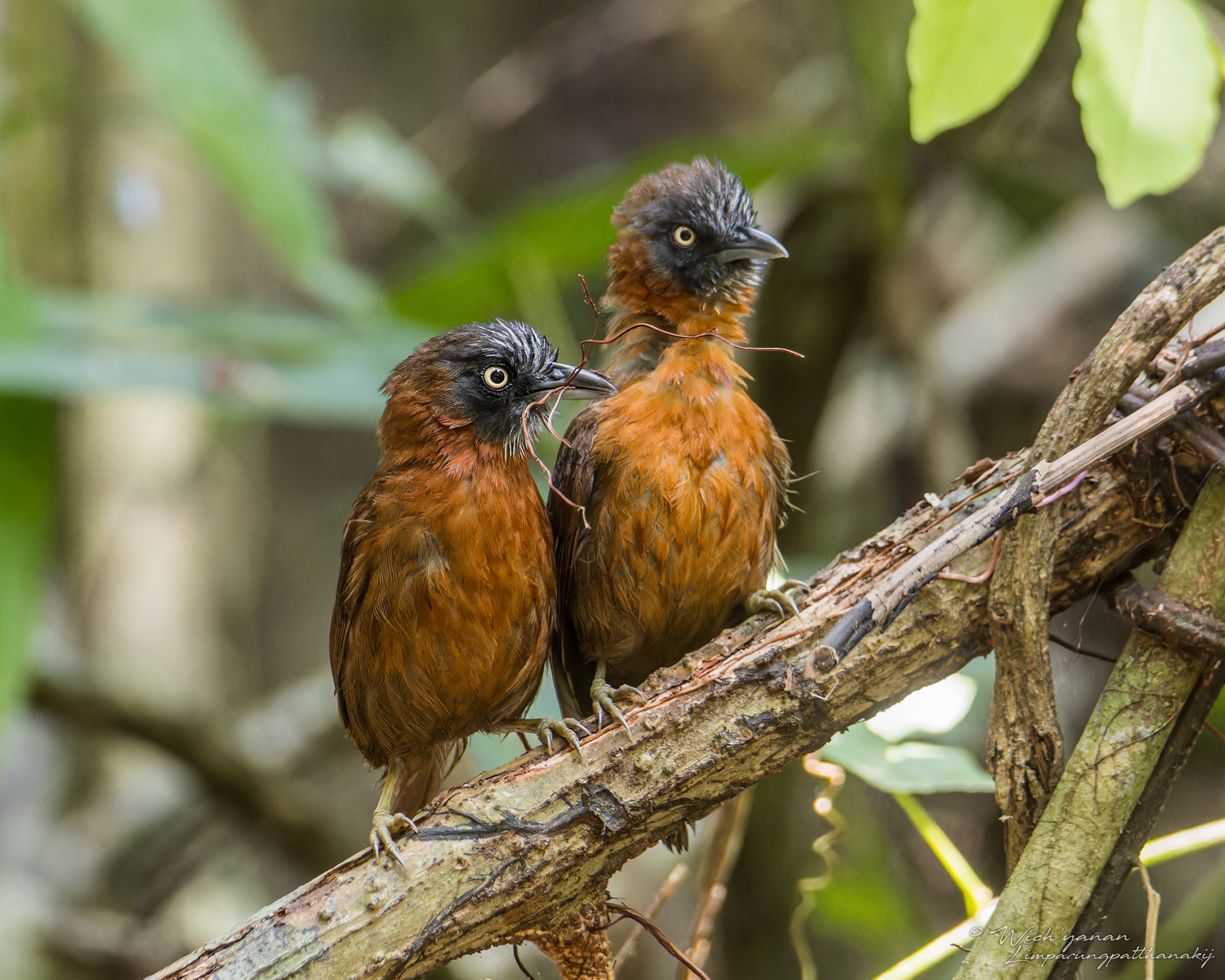

Conservation status
- Least Concern (IUCN 3.1)

Scientific classification
- Kingdom: Animalia
- Phylum: Chordata
- Class: Aves
- Order: Passeriformes
- Family: Timaliidae
- Genus: Stachyris
- Species: S. poliocephala

Binomial name
- Stachyris poliocephala (Temminck, 1836)

= Grey-headed babbler =

Species of bird

The grey-headed babbler (Stachyris poliocephala) is a species of bird in the family Timaliidae. It is found in Brunei, Indonesia, Malaysia, and Thailand. Its natural habitat is subtropical or tropical moist lowland forest.
