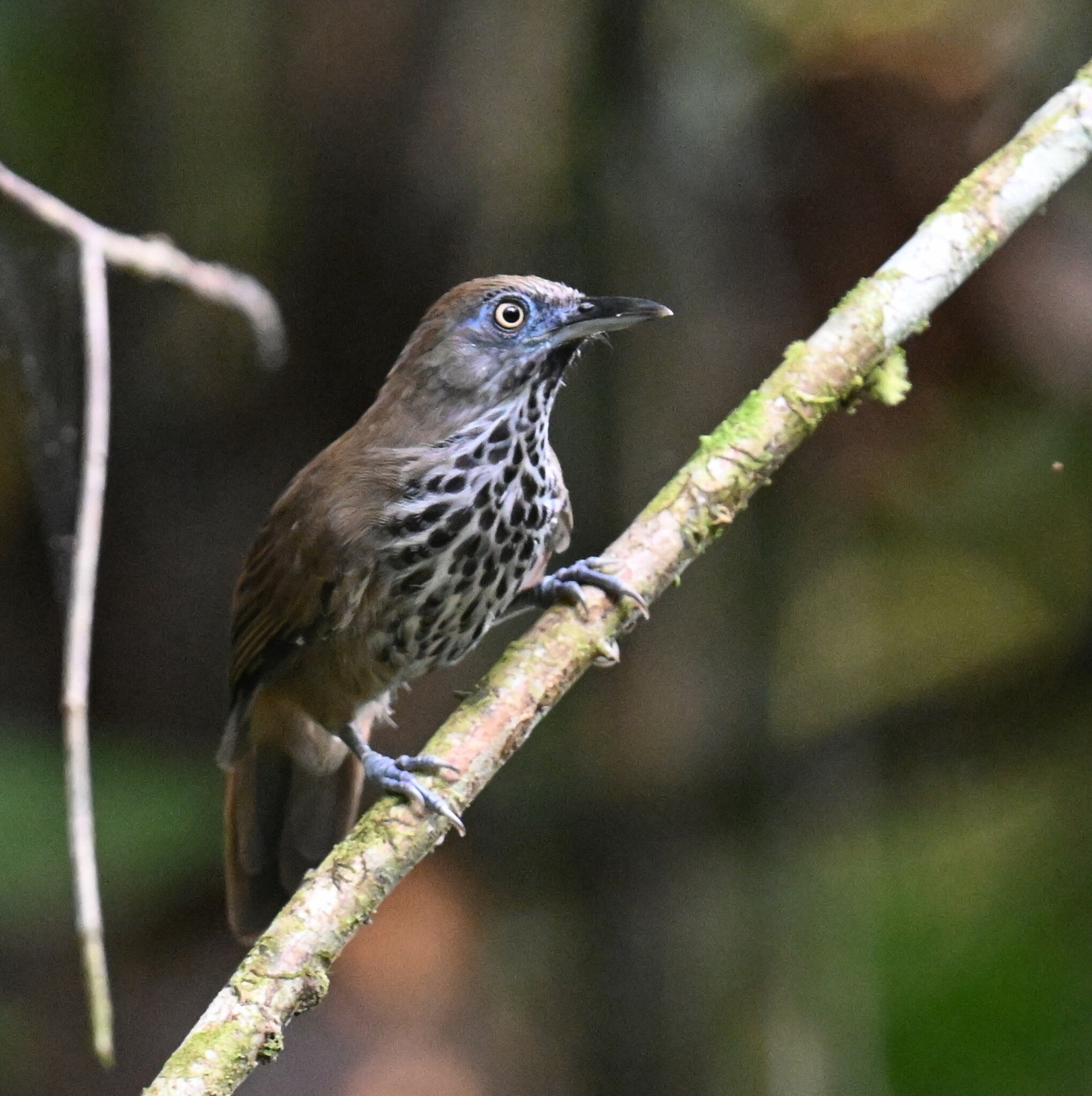

Conservation status
- Near Threatened (IUCN 3.1)

Scientific classification
- Kingdom: Animalia
- Phylum: Chordata
- Class: Aves
- Order: Passeriformes
- Family: Timaliidae
- Genus: Stachyris
- Species: S. maculata

Binomial name
- Stachyris maculata (Temminck, 1836)

= Chestnut-rumped babbler =

Species of bird

The chestnut-rumped babbler (Stachyris maculata) is a species of bird in the family Timaliidae. It is found in Brunei, Indonesia, Malaysia, and Thailand. Its natural habitat is subtropical or tropical moist lowland forests. It is threatened by habitat loss.
