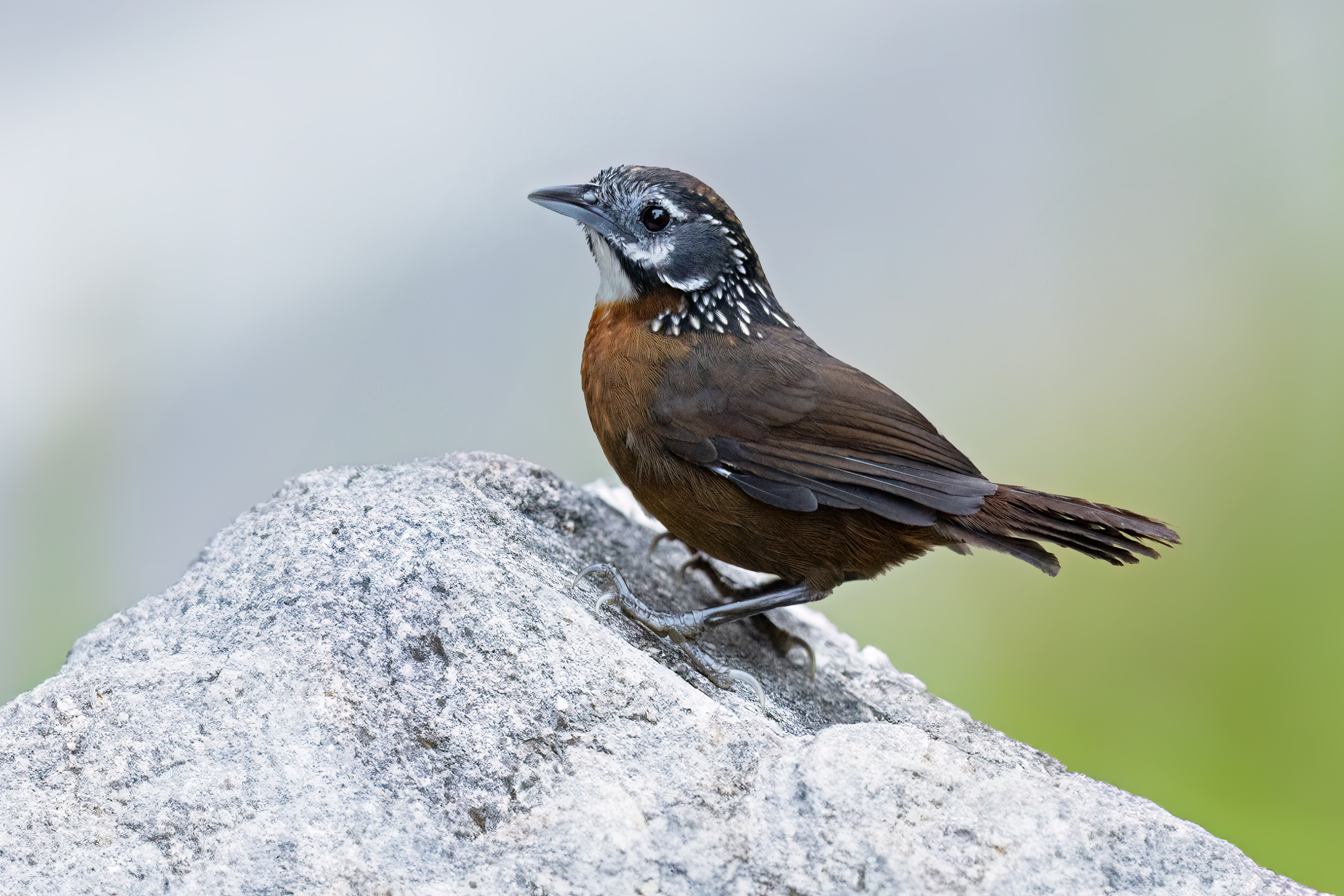

Conservation status
- Least Concern (IUCN 3.1)

Scientific classification
- Kingdom: Animalia
- Phylum: Chordata
- Class: Aves
- Order: Passeriformes
- Family: Timaliidae
- Genus: Stachyris
- Species: S. strialata

Binomial name
- Stachyris strialata (Müller, S, 1836)

= Spot-necked babbler =

Species of bird

The spot-necked babbler (Stachyris strialata) is a species of bird in the family Timaliidae.

It is found in China, Indonesia, Laos, Myanmar, Thailand, and Vietnam. Its natural habitats are subtropical or tropical moist lowland forest and subtropical or tropical moist montane forest.

== Social Behavior ==
They partake in interspecies allopreening with Nongggang babblers.
