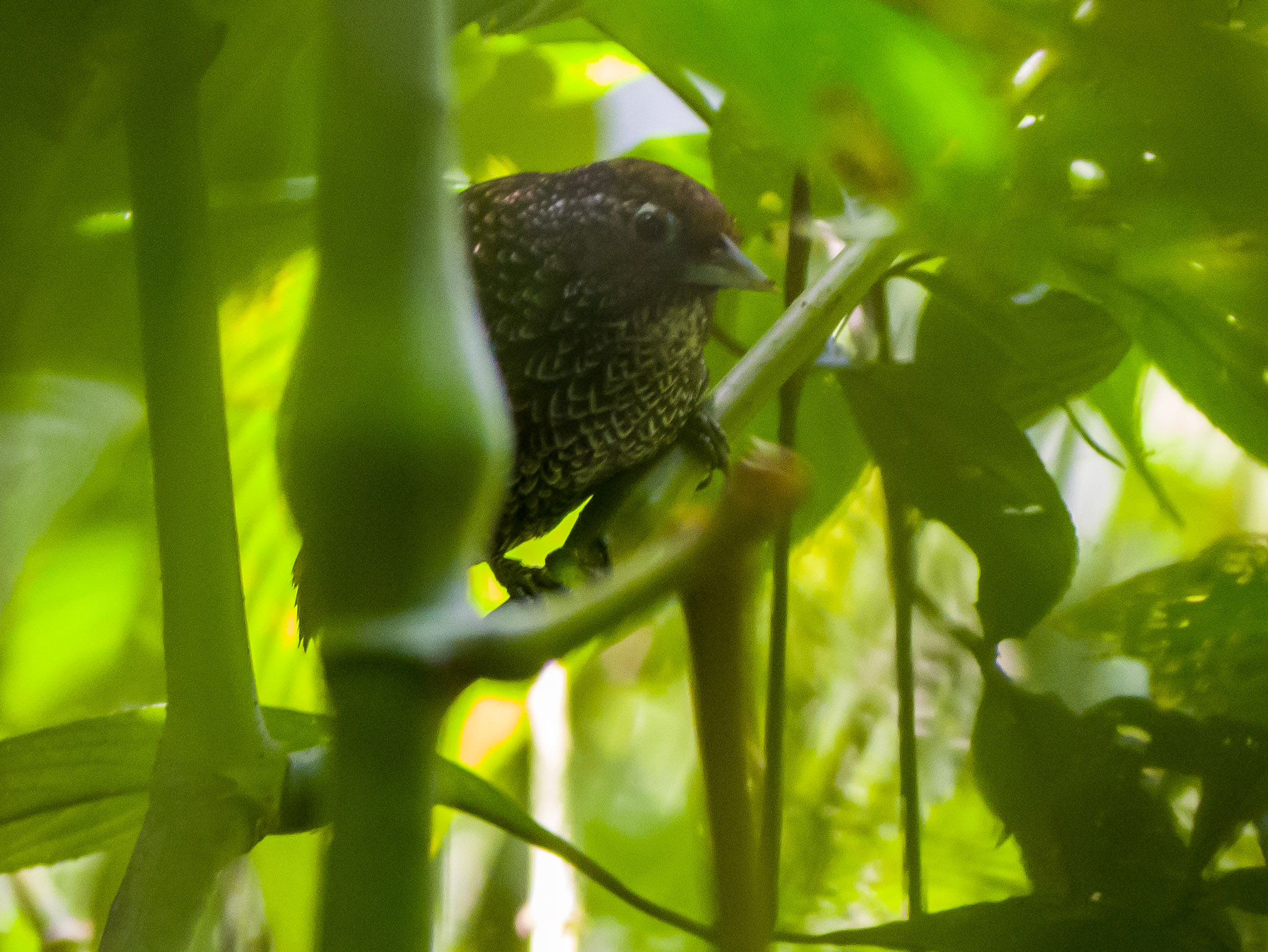

Conservation status
- Near Threatened (IUCN 3.1)

Scientific classification
- Kingdom: Animalia
- Phylum: Chordata
- Class: Aves
- Order: Passeriformes
- Family: Timaliidae
- Genus: Stachyris
- Species: S. roberti

Binomial name
- Stachyris roberti (Godwin-Austen & Walden, 1875)

Synonyms
- Sphenocichla roberti

= Cachar wedge-billed babbler =

Species of bird

The Cachar wedge-billed babbler or chevron-breasted babbler (Stachyris roberti) is a species of bird in the Old World babbler family (Timaliidae). It is named for the Cachar Hills in southern Assam.

It is found from Northeast India, in Assam, Arunachal Pradesh and nearby areas. Its natural habitats are subtropical or tropical moist lowland forests and subtropical or tropical moist montane forests. It is becoming rare due to habitat loss.
