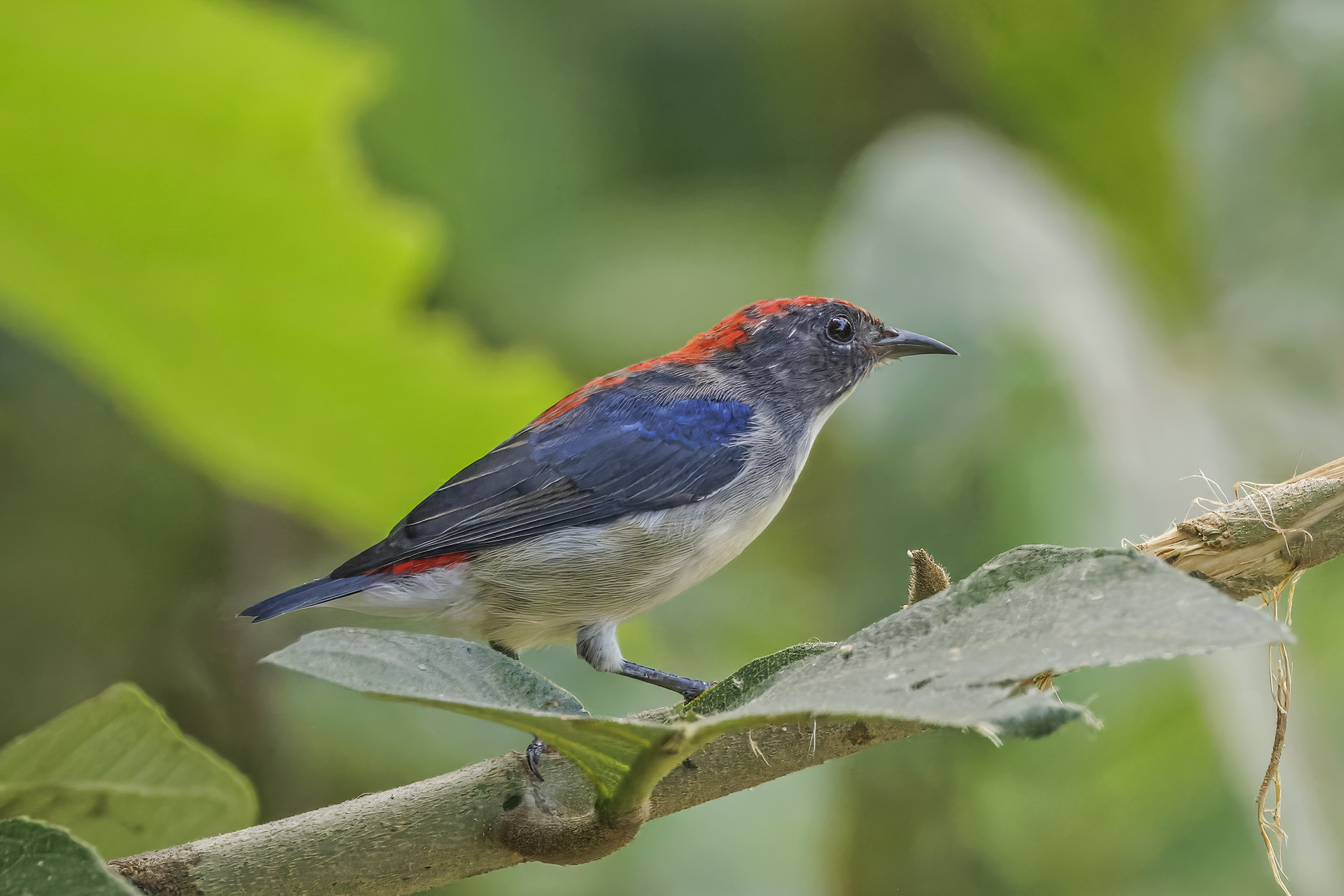
- Male in Hong Kong

Conservation status
- Least Concern (IUCN 3.1)

Scientific classification
- Kingdom: Animalia
- Phylum: Chordata
- Class: Aves
- Order: Passeriformes
- Family: Dicaeidae
- Genus: Dicaeum
- Species: D. cruentatum

Binomial name
- Dicaeum cruentatum (Linnaeus, 1758)

Synonyms
- Certhia cruentata Linnaeus, 1758

= Scarlet-backed flowerpecker =

Species of bird

The scarlet-backed flowerpecker (Dicaeum cruentatum) is a species of passerine bird in the flowerpecker family Dicaeidae. Sexually dimorphic, the male has navy blue upperparts with a bright red streak down its back from its crown to its tail coverts, while the female and juvenile are predominantly olive green. It is found in subtropical or tropical moist lowland forests and occasionally gardens in a number of countries throughout South and East Asia.

== Taxonomy ==
In 1747 the English naturalist George Edwards included an illustration and a description of the scarlet-backed flowerpecker in the second volume of his A Natural History of Uncommon Birds. He used the English name "The little Black, White, and Red Indian Creeper". Edwards based his hand-coloured etching on a preserved specimen that had been sent from Bengal to the silk-pattern designer and naturalist Joseph Dandridge in London. When in 1758 the Swedish naturalist Carl Linnaeus updated his Systema Naturae for the tenth edition, he placed the scarlet-backed flowerpecker with the treecreepers in the genus Certhia. Linnaeus included a brief description, coined the binomial name Certhia cruentata and cited Edwards' work. The scarlet-backed flowerpecker is now placed in the genus Dicaeum that was introduced by the French naturalist Georges Cuvier in 1816. The genus name is from the Ancient Greek dikaion. Cuvier claimed that this was a word for a very small Indian bird mentioned by the Roman author Claudius Aelianus but the word probably referred instead to the scarab beetle Scarabaeus sacer. The specific epithet cruentata is from Latin cruentatus meaning "blood-stained".

Genetic analysis of mitochondrial DNA of 70% of flowerpecker species showed the scarlet-backed and black-fronted flowerpecker (D. igniferum) - which is endemic to the Indonesian Lesser Sunda Islands - to be each other's closest relative; the males of both species have red plumage on their backs.

Six subspecies are recognised:

- D. c. cruentatum (Linnaeus, 1758) – east Himalayas and Bangladesh to south China, Indochina, Malay Peninsula and Myanmar
- D. c. sumatranum Cabanis, 1877 – Sumatra
- D. c. niasense Meyer de Schauensee & Ripley, 1940 – island of Nias (off west Sumatra)
- D. c. batuense Richmond, 1912 – Batu and Mentawai Islands (off southwest Sumatra)
- D. c. simalurense Salomonsen, 1961 – island of Simeulue (off northwest Sumatra)
- D. c. nigrimentum Salvadori, 1874 – Borneo

== Description ==
Measuring 9 cm (3.5 in) and weighing 7 to 8 grams (0.25 to 0.28 oz), the scarlet-backed flowerpecker is a small bird with a short tail. It exhibits sexual dimorphism. The male has a navy blue face, wings and tail, with a broad bright red stripe from its crown to its upper tail coverts. The female is predominantly olive green with a black tail and scarlet upper tail coverts and rump. Both sexes have creamy white underparts, black eyes and legs, and a dark grey arched bill. The juvenile has plumage similar to the female but has an orange bill and lacks the bright red rump.

== Distribution and habitat ==
It is found in Bangladesh, Bhutan, Brunei, Cambodia, China, India, Indonesia, Laos, Malaysia, Myanmar, Nepal, Singapore, Thailand, and Vietnam. No global population studies have been undertaken; it is thought to be common throughout most of its range particular in Thailand, although it is considered rare in Bhutan and Nepal. It is found up to 1000 m (3500 ft), in subtropical or tropical moist lowland forests, wooded areas and gardens. In the north of its range, it is found in southeastern China to Fujian (as the subspecies Dicaeum c. cruentatum). It has been recorded from both native and plantation forest in West Bengal in India.

== Feeding ==
It has been observed feeding on the figs of Ficus fistulosa and F. grossularoides in Bukit Timah Nature Reserve in Singapore. It visits Syzygium jambos in urban Hong Kong.

== Breeding ==
The scarlet-backed flowerpecker weaves its pouch-shaped nest hanging from a branch high up in a tree. The nest has a side entrance, typical for those of the flowerpecker family.

== Gallery ==
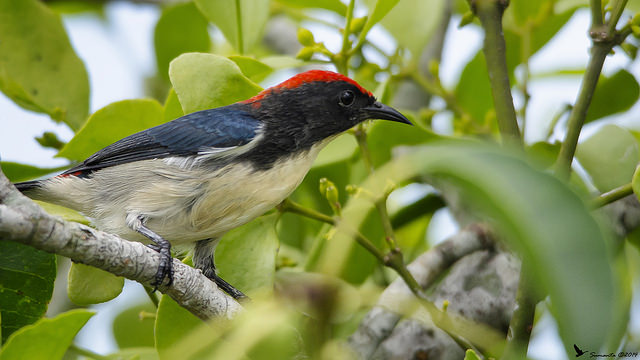
Male at Gosaba, Sundarban, West Bengal, India

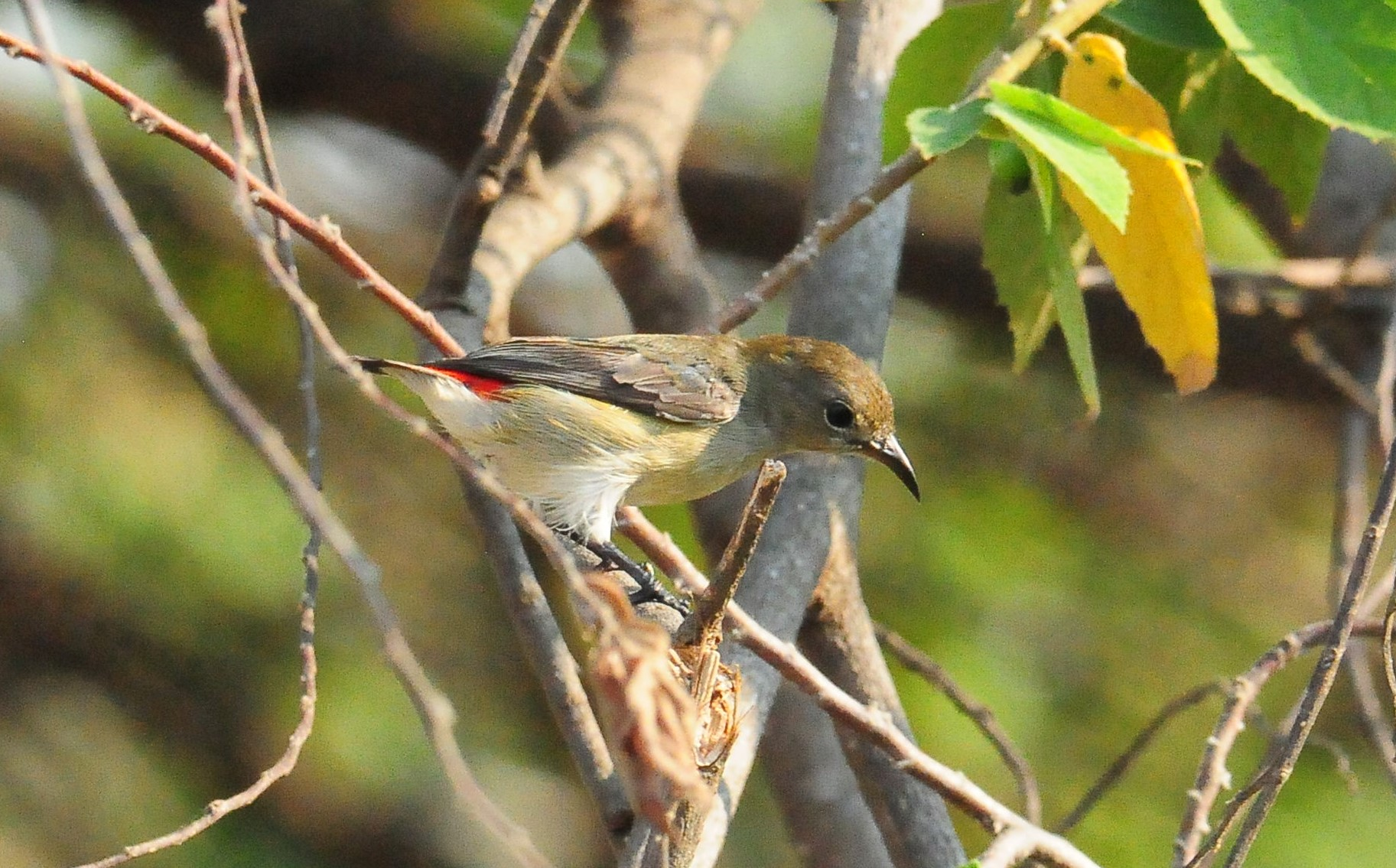
Female scarlet-backed flowerpecker, seen in Bangkapi, Bangkok, Thailand

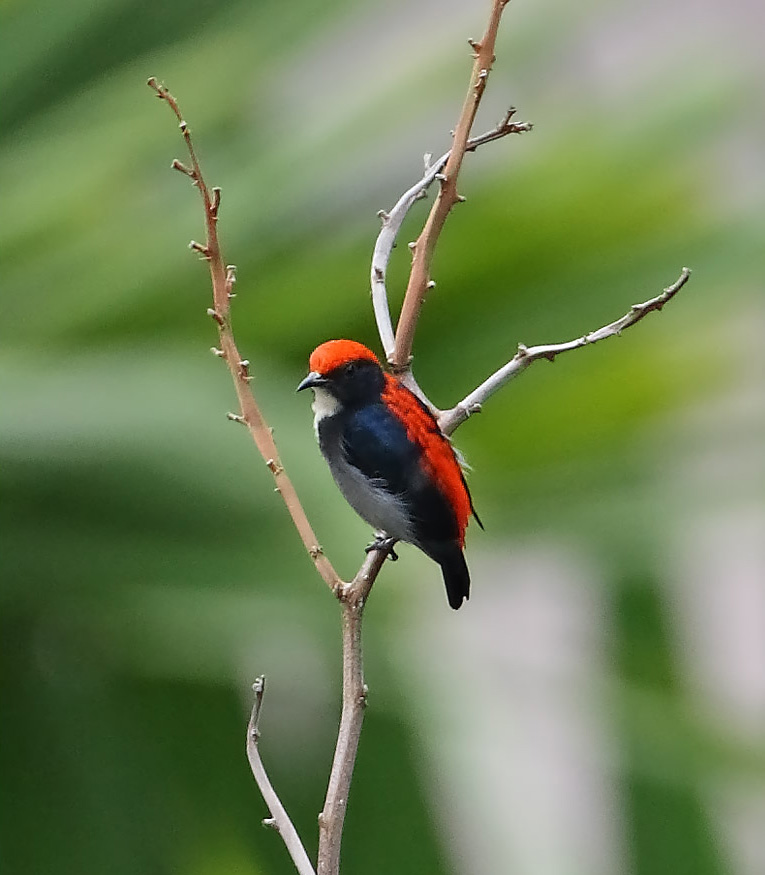
A male photographed in Singapore

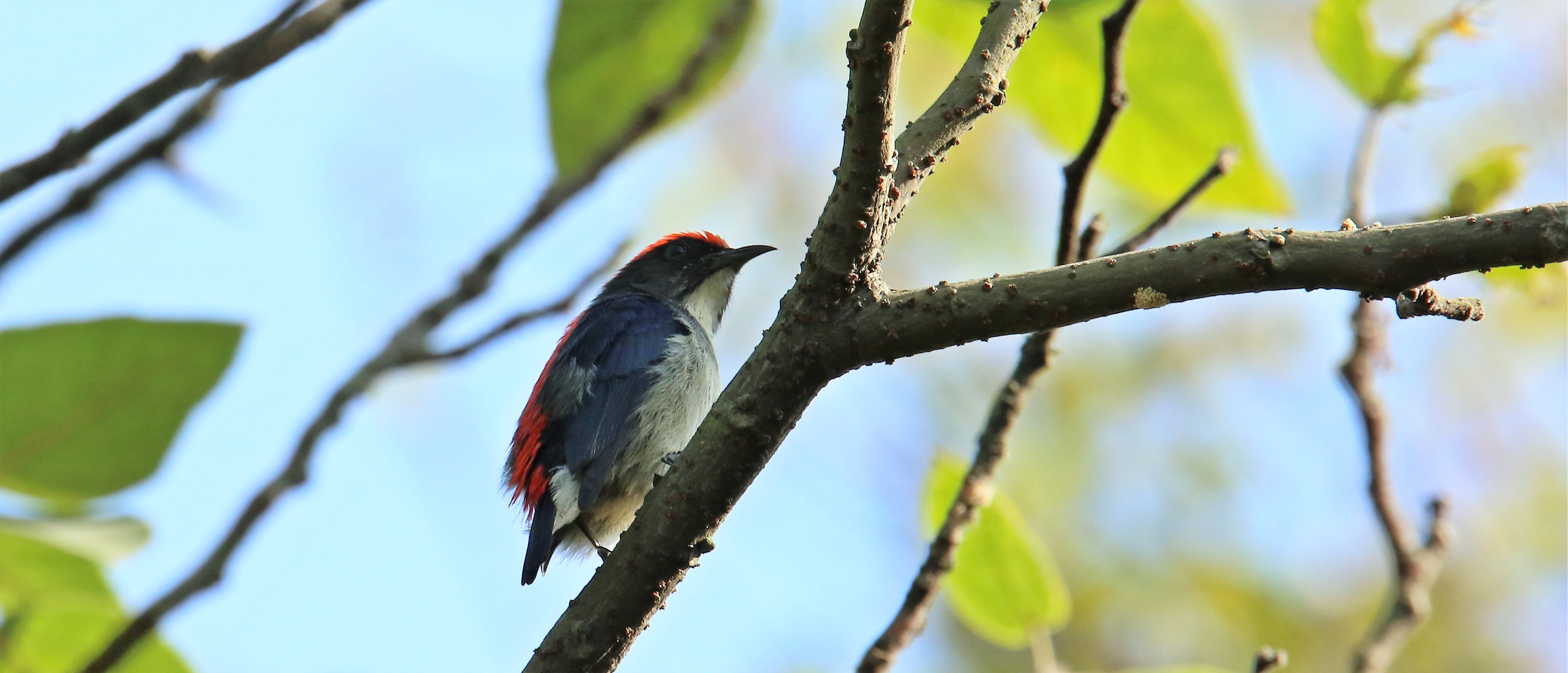
Scarlet-backed flowerpecker
