= Borneo montane rain forests =

Ecoregion in Borneo

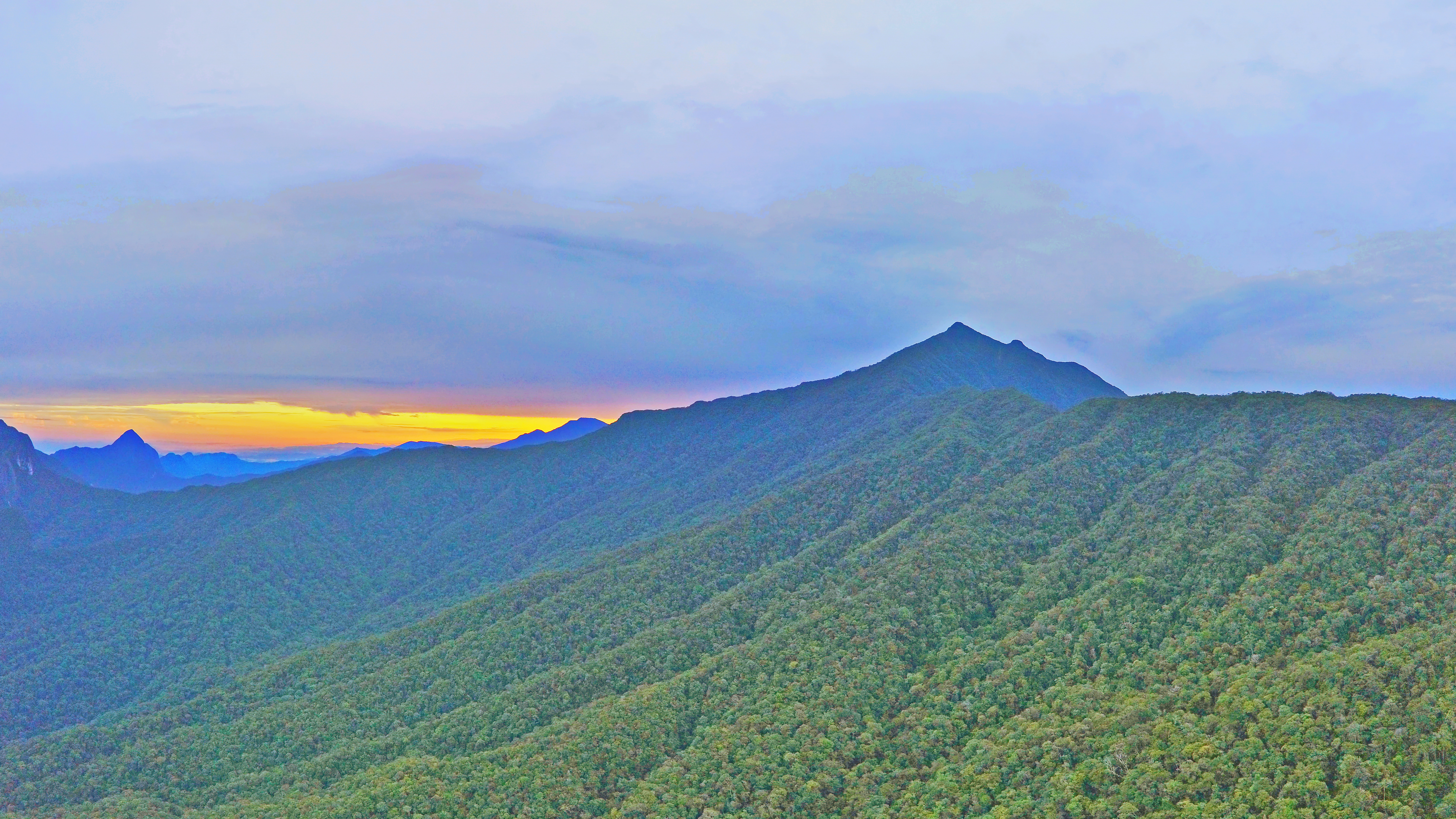
- Mount Mulu

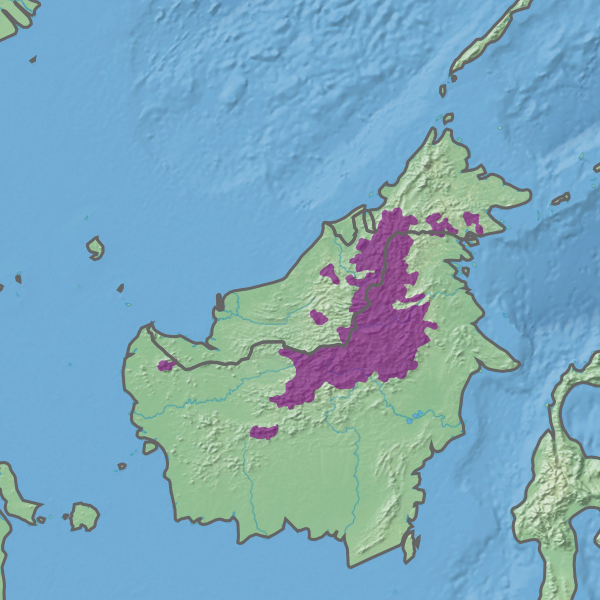
- Ecoregion territory (in purple)

Ecology
- Realm: Indomalayan
- Biome: tropical and subtropical moist broadleaf forests
- Borders: Borneo lowland rain forests; Kinabalu montane alpine meadows; Sundaland heath forests

Geography
- Area: 115,078 km^{2} (44,432 sq mi)
- Countries: Brunei; Indonesia; Malaysia

Conservation
- Conservation status: Relatively stable/intact, nature could reach half
- Protected: 23.11%

The Borneo montane rain forests is an ecoregion on the island of Borneo in Southeast Asia. It includes montane tropical and subtropical moist broadleaf forests, also known as a cloud forests. The ecoregion is partly in East Malaysia (Sabah and Sarawak states) and Indonesia (Kalimantan).

== Location and description ==
This ecoregion consists of tropical mountain cloud forest and laurel forest above 1000 meters elevation in the mountains in the centre of Borneo. It covers portions of all three countries – Brunei, Malaysia, and Indonesia – which divide Borneo. These cooler and moister slopes rise above the carpet of thick rainforest that covers the warmer lowlands below, and as well as additional rainfall also derive moisture from low clouds. Soils are poorer and more acidic than the lowlands.

== Flora ==
The isolated higher and cooler forests of the island are home to a rich and distinctive set of plants of both Asian and Australasian origin. There are especially large numbers of Nepenthes pitcher plants (>15 species), rhododendrons, and orchids.

Montane forests typically have a closed canopy with single stratum, and the canopy height generally decreases with elevation. Typical trees include species of the plant families Fagaceae and Lauraceae, with conifers increasingly abundant at higher elevations. The lower montane forests have a high diversity of orchid and fern species. Carnivorous plants, including species of Nepenthes, Drosera, and Utricularia, are most abundant in areas with high rainfall and a stunted, open tree canopy. The montane forests are interspersed with areas of graminoid scrub, generally associated with hypermagnesic cambisol soils.

This ecoregion also contains important areas of forest on limestone upland, especially Mount Api which has clear elevational zones of differing vegetation. Long Pasia in the Meligan Range and the Usun Apau Plateau have important areas of high-elevation wetland.

The ultramafic rocks which make up portions of the Crocker Range and Mount Kinabalu create soils rich in certain metallic elements (nickel, cobalt, chromium, and manganese), high cation imbalances (high Mg:Ca molar quotients), and deficiencies of some nutrients including potassium and phosphorus. These soil conditions affect the plant life, and plant communities on ultramafic soils show lower stature and lower biomass, higher levels of endemism, and a distinct species composition compared to typical montane plant communities at similar elevations.

== Fauna ==
The montane rain forests are home to a distinct fauna, including large numbers of mammals such as civets (such as the rare Hose's civet Diplogale hosei, endemic to these montane forests), tree shrews, squirrels, and rats and primates such as orangutan (Pongo pygmaeus), gibbons, and langurs. Although most of these primates prefer lower elevations there are especially good numbers of the large macaque monkeys and as the forests are less-disturbed at higher elevations larger animals such as orangutans and Sumatran rhinoceros (Dicerorhinus sumatrensis) have retreated here from the lowlands.

Although there are fewer birds in the Bornean mountains than in the lowlands there is a higher proportion of endemic species, indeed most of Borneo's unique birds live in the montane forests e.g. on Mount Mulu in Sarawak there are 171 different birds in the lowlands and only 12 species at 1300m. Endemic and near-endemic bird species include the crimson-headed partridge (Haematortyx sanguiniceps), fruithunter (Chlamydochaera jefferyi), pygmy white-eye (Heleia squamifrons), Rajah scops owl (Otus brookii), Kinabalu serpent eagle (Spilornis kinabaluensis), Whitehead's trogon (Harpactes whiteheadi), Bornean barbet (Psilopogon eximius), golden-naped barbet (Psilopogon pulcherrimus), Whitehead's spiderhunter (Arachnothera juliae), Hose's broadbill (Calyptomena hosii), Whitehead's broadbill (Calyptomena whiteheadi), black-sided flowerpecker (Dicaeum monticolum), black oriole (Oriolus hosii), Bornean whistler (Pachycephala hypoxantha) friendly bush warbler (Locustella accentor), eyebrowed jungle flycatcher (Vauriella gularis), blue-wattled bulbul (Pycnonotus nieuwenhuisii), Bornean stubtail (Urosphena whiteheadi), bare-headed babbler (Melanocichla calva), chestnut-crested yuhina (Staphida everetti), mountain wren-babbler (Gypsophila crassa), Sunda laughingthrush (Garrulax palliatus), Everett's thrush (Zoothera everetti), black-capped white-eye (Zosterops atricapilla), and mountain blackeye (Zosterops emiliae).

== Threats and preservation ==
The higher elevations of Borneo are relatively inaccessible, and subject to less logging and conversion to agriculture than the lowland rain forests. The montane forests were less affected by the forest fires of 1997-8 that damaged so much of Borneo's lowland forest. Approximately three-quarters of the montane forests are still relatively intact. 23.11% of the ecoregion is in protected areas. Protected areas include a very large block in Kayan Mentarang National Park, which is home to communities of indigenous people but is threatened by commercial logging and road building. This park and others such as Betung Kerihun National Park are important refuges for wildlife as lowland habitats are being systematically removed. Protected areas include:

- Gunung Mulu National Park
- Kayan Mentarang National Park
- Betung Kerihun National Park
- Pulong Tau National Park
- Usun Apau National Park
- Ulu Temburong National Park
- Bukit Baka Bukit Raya National Park
- Gunung Buda National Park
- Kalamuku National Park
- Bald Hill Forest Reserve
- Mt. Andrassy Forest Reserve
- Quoin Hill Forest Reserve
- Ulu Kalumpang Forest Reserve
- Maliau Basin Forest Reserve and buffer zones
- Gunong Lumaku Forest Reserve
- Basio Forest Reserve
- Maligan Forest Reserve
- Sungai Sansiang Forest Reserve
- Agathis Forest Reserve
- Danum Valley Forest Reserve
- Sungai Serudong Forest Reserve
- Sungai Siliawan & Sungai Siliawan (Extension) Forest Reserve
- Gunung Lumaku Forest Reserve
- Gunung Kumaka Forest Reserve
- Gunung Rara Wildlife Corridor Forest Reserve
- Kungkular Forest Reserve
- Mengilan Forest Reserve
- Mount Louisa Forest Reserve
- Nurod Urod Forest Reserve
- Pensiangan Forest Reserve
- Silimpopon Forest Reserve
- Sipitang Forest Reserve
- Sungai Anjeranjermut Forest Reserve
- Sungai Katambalang Forest Reserve
- Sungai Sumagas Forest Reserve
- Sungai Tiagau Forest Reserve
- Tajong Forest Reserve
- Tambulanan Forest Reserve
- Ulu Segama Forest Reserve

== See also ==
- Heart of Borneo
