= Usun Apau National Park =

National park in Malaysia

- Taman Negara Usun Apau
- IUCN category II (national park)
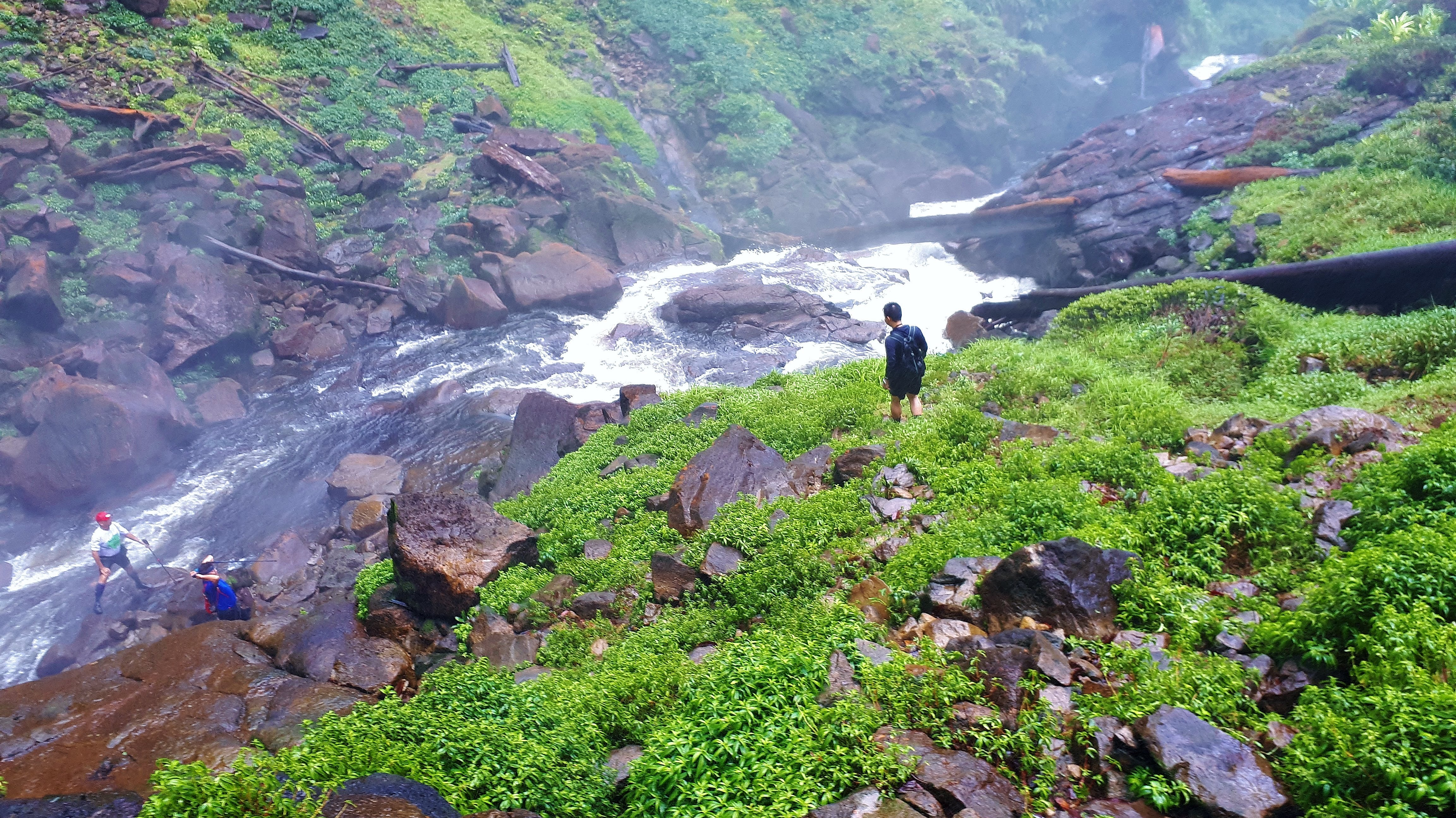

- Location within Malaysia
- Location: Miri Division, Sarawak, Malaysia
- Coordinates: 3°1.76′N 114°38.98′E(Wikidata)
- Area: 471.22 km^{2} (181.94 sq mi)
- Designated: 2005
- Governing body: Sarawak Forestry Corporation (SFC)

Usun Apau National Park (Malay: Taman Negara Usun Apau) is a national park in Sarawak, Malaysia, on the island of Borneo. It was designated in 2005. It covers the Usun Apau Plateau in the highlands of central Borneo.

== Geography ==
Usun Apau is a volcanic plateau covering an area of approximately 1,550 km^{2}, and averaging 1000 meters in elevation. There are three extinct volcanoes in the center of the plateau – Selidang (1,370 m), Kenawang (1,280 m), and Mabun (1,280 m). The northern, eastern, and western edges of the plateau end in steep escarpments nearly 300 meters high. Three rivers drop from the northern edge of the escarpment, including the Julan River, which forms the Julan waterfall almost 245 meters high. Streams from the plateau form the headwaters of the Rajang and Baram rivers.

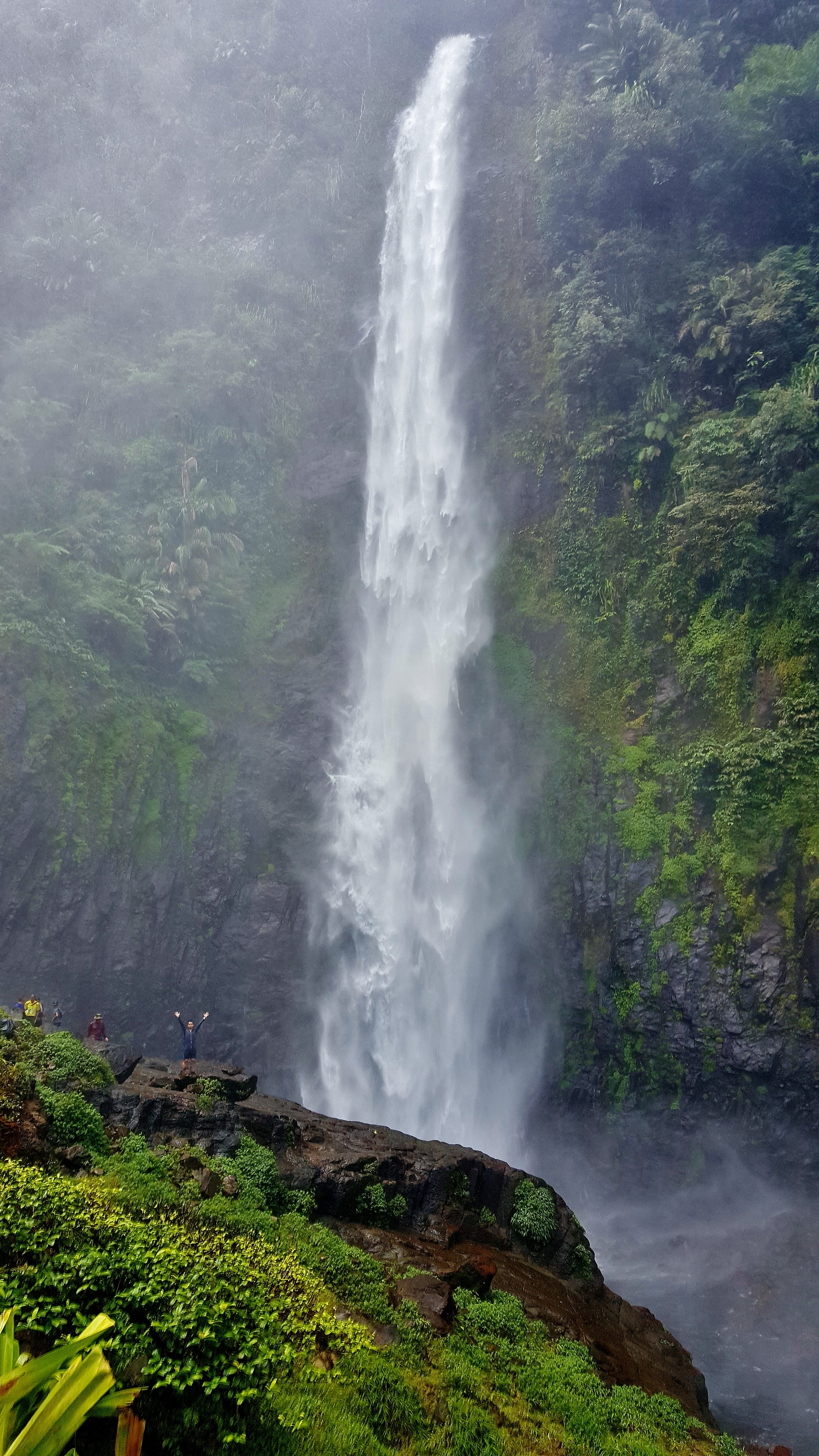
Julan Waterfall

== Flora and fauna ==
The plateau is covered by montane rain forests, including kerapa, a stunted forest of small trees with gnarled trunks and which forms on poor soil with bad drainage, and kerangas forest, made up of tall trees with thin trunks growing on infertile volcanic soil. Hill dipterocarp forest covers the lower slopes of the plateau.

The plateau is home to several vulnerable and near-threatened bird species, including the Bulwer's pheasant (Lophura bulweri), Bornean ground cuckoo (Carpococcyx radiceus), rhinoceros hornbill (Buceros rhinoceros), ferruginous partridge (Caloperdix oculeus), Dulit frogmouth (Batrachostomus harterti), Gould's frogmouth (Batrachostomus stellatus), Whitehead's trogon (Harpactes whiteheadi), Hose's broadbill (Calyptomena hosii), black oriole (Oriolus hosii), Sunda laughingthrush (Garrulax palliatus), and Everett's thrush (Zoothera everetti). It is designated an Important Bird Area.

The gracile slender toad (Ansonia teneritas) is known only from the plateau and one other locality.

== Access ==
The plateau is relatively inaccessible, with access to the base of the plateau on logging roads, and only trails and no roads on the plateau itself.

In August 2022, Sarawak's premier Abang Abdul Rahman Johari Abang Openg announced that the Government of Sarawak would improve road access to the national park, and Julan Waterfall in particular, to open it to tourism, as part of the state's Post-COVID-19 Development Strategy through 2030.

== See also ==
- List of national parks of Malaysia
