= Quercus percoriacea =

Conservation status
- Endangered (IUCN 3.1)

Scientific classification
- Kingdom: Plantae
- Clade: Embryophytes
- Clade: Tracheophytes
- Clade: Spermatophytes
- Clade: Angiosperms
- Clade: Eudicots
- Clade: Rosids
- Order: Fagales
- Family: Fagaceae
- Genus: Quercus
- Subgenus: Quercus subg. Cerris
- Section: Quercus sect. Cyclobalanopsis
- Species: Q. percoriacea

Binomial name
- Quercus percoriacea Soepadmo (1966)

Species of plant

Quercus percoriacea is a species of oak endemic to Borneo, where it is known only from northern Sarawak state of Malaysia. It is placed in Quercus subgenus Cerris, section Cyclobalanopsis.

== Range and habitat ==
Quercus percoriacea is endemic to the island of Borneo, where it is known from three locations in northern Sarawak state, including Usun Apau National Park. The species has an estimated area of occupancy (AOO) of only 12 km^{2}.

It grows in plateau heath forests, also known as kerangas forests, on nutrient-poor sandy soil between 1,000 and 1,300 meters elevation.

== Conservation ==
Quercus percoriacea has a sparse population across a limited range. It is threatened with habitat loss from the widespread deforestation on Borneo.
