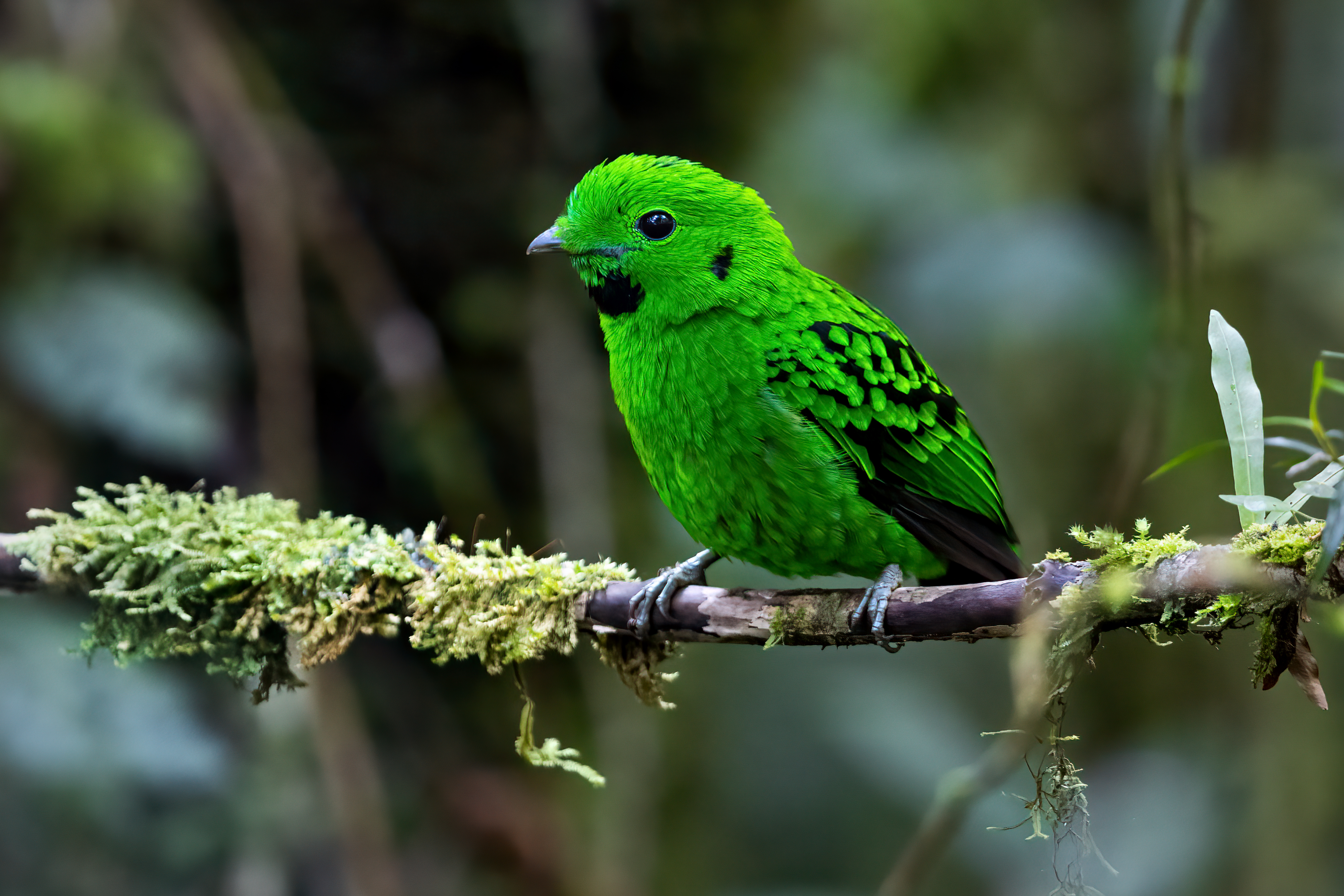

Conservation status
- Least Concern (IUCN 3.1)

Scientific classification
- Kingdom: Animalia
- Phylum: Chordata
- Class: Aves
- Order: Passeriformes
- Family: Calyptomenidae
- Genus: Calyptomena
- Species: C. whiteheadi

Binomial name
- Calyptomena whiteheadi Sharpe, 1887
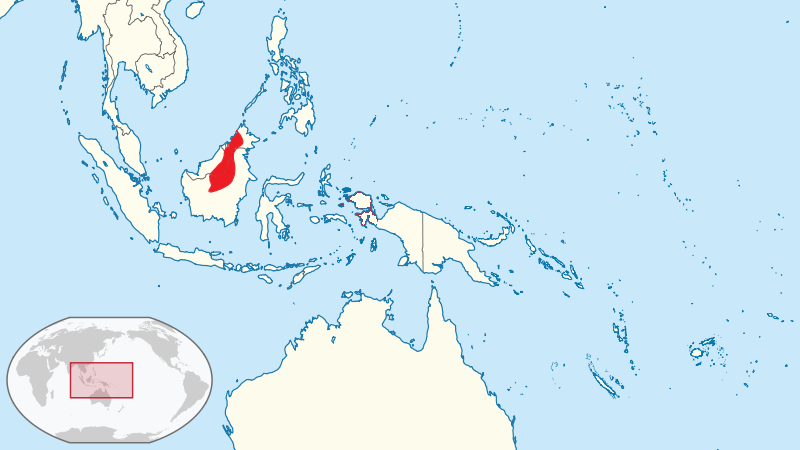

= Whitehead's broadbill =

Species of bird endemic to Borneo

Whitehead's broadbill (Calyptomena whiteheadi) is a species of bird in the family Calyptomenidae. It is endemic to the mountain ranges of north-central Borneo, where it mainly inhabits montane forests and forest edges at elevations of 900–1,700 m (3,000–5,600 ft). It is 24–27 cm (9.4–10.6 in) long, with males weighing 142–171 g (5.0–6.0 oz) and females weighing 150–163 g (5.3–5.7 oz). Males are vivid green and have a black throat patch, black spots on the ear-coverts and back of the neck, and black markings and streaking all over the body. The tails and flight feathers are also blackish. Females are smaller and lack the black markings on the head and underparts. Juveniles look similar to adults but have fewer black markings.

Described by the British ornithologist Richard Bowdler Sharpe in 1887, Whitehead's broadbill is named after the British explorer John Whitehead. It mainly feeds on fruit and supplements its diet with insects. Breeding probably occurs from March to June, with clutches containing one or two eggs. Although it is classified as being of least concern by the International Union for Conservation of Nature, it is threatened by habitat destruction and its population is thought to be decreasing.

== Taxonomy and systematics ==
Whitehead's broadbill was described as Calyptomena whiteheadi by the British naturalist Richard Bowdler Sharpe in 1887 based on specimens from Mount Kinabalu, Borneo. The name of the genus, Calyptomena, is from the Ancient Greek words kaluptos, meaning covered, and mēnē, meaning moon. The specific name, whiteheadi, is in honour of the British explorer John Whitehead, who collected the specimens based on which the species was described. Whitehead's broadbill is the official common name designated by the International Ornithologists' Union. Other names for the species include Whitehead's green broadbill, black-throated broadbill, and black-throated green broadbill.

Whitehead's broadbill is one of three species in the genus Calyptomena, a genus of three bright green broadbills found in Southeast Asia. Calyptomena is one of two genera in the family Calyptomenidae, the other being Smithornis, a genus of three rather dull-coloured species found in Africa. Although species-level relationships within the family are unclear, both the genera are monophyletic (including all descendants of a common ancestor) taxa that are sister (most closely related) to each other.

== Description ==
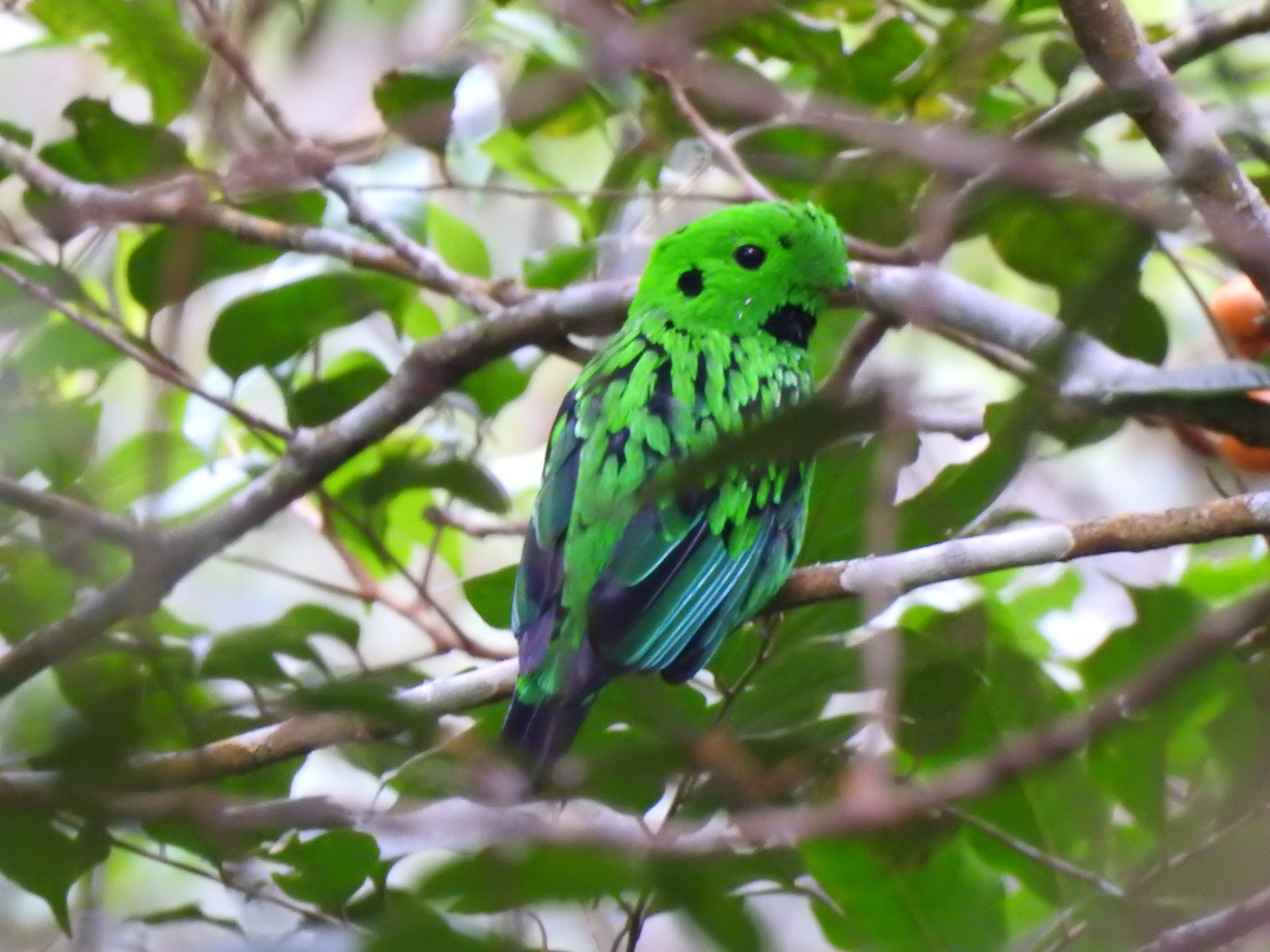
Whitehead's broadbill in Kinabalu Park

The largest species in the genus Calyptomena, Whitehead's broadbill is 24–27 cm (9.4–10.6 in) long, with males weighing 142–171 g (5.0–6.0 oz) and females weighing 150–163 g (5.3–5.7 oz). Males are vivid green, with some black on the top of the head, black spots on the ear-coverts and back of the neck, and a large black patch on the lower throat and upper breast. They also have extensive black markings on the wings and upper back, conspicuous streaking on the underparts, and blackish tails and flight feathers. The iris is dark brown, the feet are olive to greyish-green, and the bill is black with a pale lower mandible. The forehead has a large tuft of feathers that nearly covers the bill. Females are smaller than males, with a smaller forehead tuft, no black marking on the head, and duller green underparts that lack black streaking. Juveniles are similar to adults but have fewer black markings.

Whitehead's broadbill can be told apart from the other species in its genus by its larger size, black throat, and more extensive black markings on the body.

=== Vocalisations ===
Snoring, grinding, and wheezing two-syllable calls such as toc-trrr are characteristic of Whitehead's broadbill. Groups of 3–4 males make a rough, harsh kerrrrrr or kh-khrrrrrr, along with a chek, rrrrt-rrrrt and teek-waaaaarrr. Other calls include a staccato eek-eek-eek, a harsh tzip followed by a 2–3 second long rattle, and a fast series of harsh notes given in flight, all of which are similar to those made by woodpeckers. A hissing ee-ooo may be the species' alarm call. It also makes a flat, low-pitched go-up similar to that of a trogon (which attracts individuals when mimicked), a high saaat, a loud, grating call like that of a jay, a snore-like wheeze, and other hissing and grating sounds.

== Distribution and habitat ==
Whitehead's broadbill is endemic to Borneo, where it is found in the northern and central parts of the island. It is likely found throughout the entire range of mountains that runs down the centre of the island from Mount Kinabalu to Kayan Mentarang and Mount Batu Timbang, although it is locally absent from some areas.

It inhabits primary montane forest and forest edge, preferring areas with taller growth. It is most common at elevations of 900–1,700 m (3,000–5,600 ft), although it can be found at elevations as low as 600 m (2,000 ft) and as high as 1,980 m (6,500 ft). It does not migrate, but does move locally depending on the fruiting seasons of the trees it feeds on. Individuals have also been seen at 75 m (246 ft) during severe droughts.

== Behaviour and ecology ==
Whitehead's broadbills usually perch silently, but are sometimes loud and conspicuous. Their generation length is 4.2 years.

=== Feeding ===
The species mainly feeds on fruit, supplementing its diet with insects. The fruits eaten vary from small berries to large drupes, with fruits up to 15 mm × 20 mm (0.59 in × 0.79 in) in size found in stomachs. It has also been observed feeding on the strong-smelling fruit of Litsea cubica. In Kinabalu Park, the species has been observed hunting moths near lights at dawn.

Whitehead's broadbills usually forage alone, but can sometimes be found in small, noisy flocks near fruiting trees. They also occasionally join mixed-species foraging flocks, which can also contain Sunda cuckooshrikes, chestnut-hooded laughingthrushes, Sunda laughingthrushes, and Whitehead's trogons.

=== Breeding ===
The breeding season of Whitehead's broadbill probably lasts from March to June. Nests are suspended from slender branches around 15 m (50 ft) above the ground, with the outside made of fresh green moss. The inside is firm and lined with dry bamboo leaves, forming a well-sheltered cavity. A long extending "tail" made of lichen and moss helps camouflage the nest. Clutches contain one or two eggs, which are glossy and pale yellow in colour. The eggs measure 1.26 in–1.45 in × 1 in (32 mm–37 mm × 25 mm). Incubation lasts 19 days and fledging period is 27 days.

== Status ==
Whitehead's broadbill is classified as being of least concern by the International Union for Conservation of Nature due to its sufficiently large range and population and a lack of significant population decline. It is fairly common in appropriate habitat and occurs in several protected areas, such as Gunung Mulu National Park and Kinabalu Park. However, its population is currently thought to be declining due to habitat destruction.
