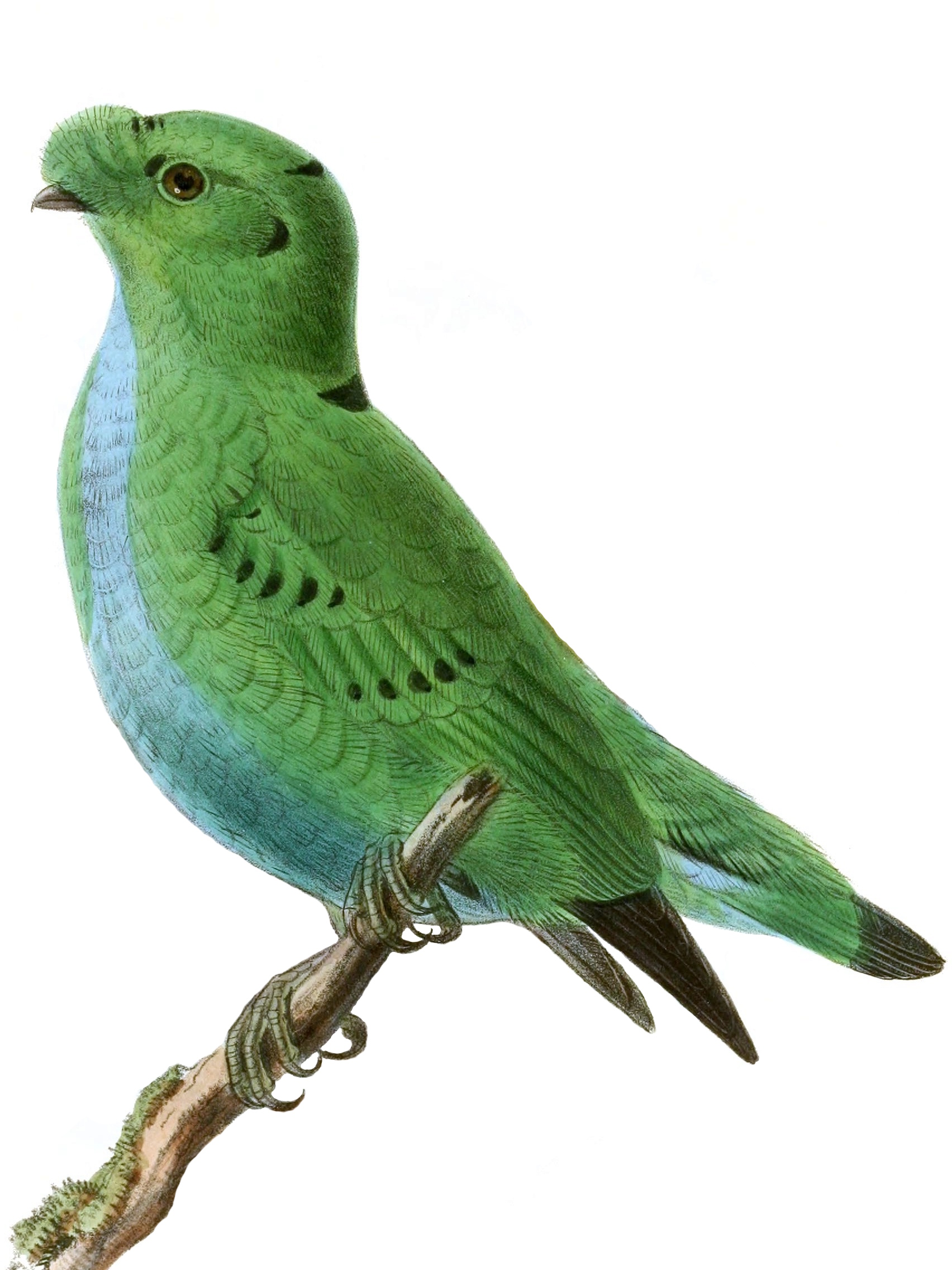

Conservation status
- Least Concern (IUCN 3.1)

Scientific classification
- Kingdom: Animalia
- Phylum: Chordata
- Class: Aves
- Order: Passeriformes
- Family: Calyptomenidae
- Genus: Calyptomena
- Species: C. hosii

Binomial name
- Calyptomena hosii Sharpe, 1892
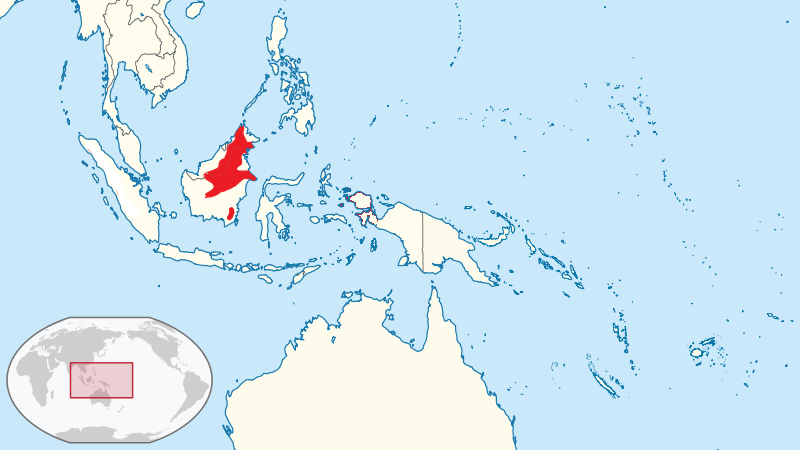

= Hose's broadbill =

Species of bird endemic to Borneo

Hose's broadbill (Calyptomena hosii) is a species of bird in the family Calyptomenidae. It was described by the British naturalist Richard Bowdler Sharpe in 1892 and is named after the British zoologist Charles Hose, who collected the holotype of the species. It is 19–21 cm (7.5–8.3 in) long, with females weighing 92 g (3.2 oz) on average and males weighing 102–115 g (3.6–4.1 oz). Males are bright green and have conspicuous black spots on the wings, black markings on the head, blue underparts, black flight feathers, and a large green tuft covering most of the bill. Females have smaller forehead tufts, lime-green underparts with sky blue instead of azure blue on the undertail coverts, and lack black markings on the head, except for a black spot in front of the eye.

The species is endemic to montane regions in north, central, and southeastern Borneo, where it mostly occurs in forests at elevations of 600–1,220 m (1,970–4,000 ft). Omnivorous, it mainly feeds on fruit like figs and berries, supplementing its diet with insects and leaf buds. It is mainly seen alone or in pairs but can form flocks of up to 6–8 birds near fruiting trees. Breeding occurs from April to October, with clutches of 2–4 eggs being laid in delicate hanging nests. It is classified as being Least Concern by the International Union for Conservation of Nature, despite a declining population caused by habitat destruction.

== Taxonomy and systematics ==
Hose's broadbill was described as Calyptomena hosii by the British naturalist Richard Bowdler Sharpe in 1892 based on specimens collected from Mount Dulit, Borneo. The name of the genus, Calyptomena, is from the Ancient Greek words kaluptos, meaning covered, and mēnē, meaning moon. The specific name hosii, as well as the common name, is in honour of the British zoologist Charles Hose, who collected the holotype of the species. Hose's broadbill is the official common name designated by the International Ornithologists' Union. Other names for the species include blue-bellied broadbill, Hose's green broadbill, magnificent broadbill, and magnificent green broadbill.

Whitehead's broadbill is one of three species in the genus Calyptomena, a genus of three bright green broadbills found in Southeast Asia. Calyptomena is one of two genera in the family Calyptomenidae, the other being Smithornis, a genus of three rather dull-coloured species found in Africa. Although species-level relationships within the family are unclear, both the genera are monophyletic (including all descendants of a common ancestor) taxa that are sister (most closely related) to each other.

== Description ==
Hose's broadbill is 19–21 cm (7.5–8.3 in) long, with females weighing 92 g (3.2 oz) on average and males weighing 102–115 g (3.6–4.1 oz). Males have bright shimmery green upperparts, with a large tuft of feathers on the forehead covering most of the bill and a thin pale green eye-ring. There is a black spot in front of the eyes and black patches behind the ear-coverts, on the back of the neck, and across the upper back. The wing coverts have conspicuous circular black spots and the flight feathers are black with green edges. The breast is indigo blue and the belly and undertail coverts are azure blue.

Females differ in their smaller forehead tufts, paler upperparts with a slight olive tint, and lime-green underparts with sky blue instead of azure blue. They also have lime green eye-rings and no black on the head other than the spot in front of the eye. The iris is blackish, the bill is dark brownish-black to black, and the feet are dark olive green. Juveniles are mostly like females, but juvenile males have dark feathers on the back of the neck. Immature males are similar to adult males, but lack most of the head markings and have less blue on the underparts.

The species can be differentiated from the other two species of Calyptomena, which also occur in Borneo, by its blue underparts. It can be told apart from the green broadbill by its larger size and spots on the wings, instead of bars as in the latter. Whitehead's broadbill is larger and has a black patch on the breast.

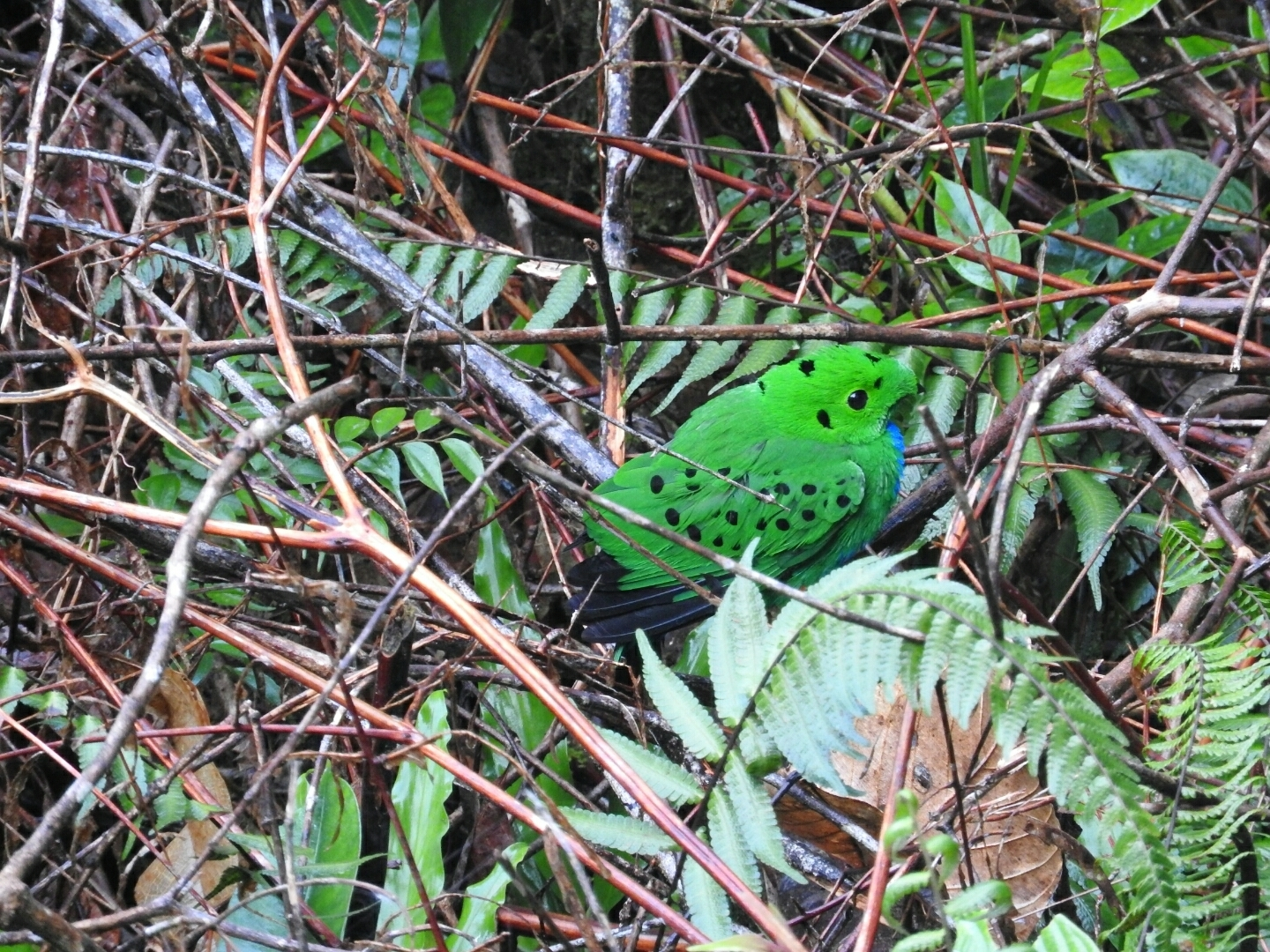
Live bird

The only recorded vocalisation is a low, soft, pleasant dove-like coo-wooo, with the second note upslurred. It is given while making bobbing head movements.

== Distribution and habitat ==
Endemic to the island of Borneo, Hose's broadbill inhabits the northern and central parts of the island, where it is found discontinuously from Mount Kinabalu to the Müller Mountains, Kayan Mentarang, the Dulit Range, the Sambaliung Mountains, and the Sangkulirang Peninsula. It is also found in southeastern Borneo. It may be locally migratory depending on the fruiting seasons of trees it feeds on.

Hose's broadbill is mainly found on hill slopes, inhabiting dipterocarp forest, lower montane forest, lowland forest on hills, and forests with limestone pinnacles (rock columns). It is mainly found at elevations of 600–1,220 m (1,970–4,000 ft), but can be seen as low as 300 m (980 ft) and as high as around 1,680 m (5,510 ft).

== Behaviour and ecology ==
The generation length (average age of parents in the current population) of the species is 4.2 years.

The species is omnivorous but mainly feeds on fruit, such as figs and berries. It has been recorded eating soft, greyish-yellow berries and small orange figs covered with short, spiky hairs. It also eats insects and leaf buds. It generally forages in the lower levels of the forest. Hose's broadbills are mainly seen alone or in pairs, but small flocks of 6–8 birds are found at fruiting trees.

Breeding has been observed from April to October. It makes a delicate hanging nest out of dead leaves, rattans, and bamboo, with an outer covering of green moss and lichen and a trailing "tail" made of rattan leaves. One nest measured around 25 cm × 15 cm (9.8 in × 5.9 in) and was hanging from a low, sagging branch 1.5 m (4.9 ft) high. Clutches have 2–4 eggs. The time taken for incubation and fledging is unknown.

== Status ==
Hose's broadbill was classified as being Near Threatened by the International Union for Conservation of Nature from 2000 – 2023 due to a moderately rapid decline in its population caused by habitat destruction at lower altitudes in its range. However, as of 2023 it was downlisted to Least Concern. It is locally common and occurs in several protected areas like Gunung Mulu National Park, but becomes rarer after deforestation occurs. Lowland logging in its range has been extensive, but the species' preference for montane habitats may protect it in the short term. Surveys to understand the extent of population decline, studies to find the species' habitat preferences, and protection of areas with suitable habitats are needed to conserve the species.
