= Ansonia teneritas =

Conservation status
- Endangered (IUCN 3.1)

Scientific classification
- Kingdom: Animalia
- Phylum: Chordata
- Class: Amphibia
- Order: Anura
- Family: Bufonidae
- Genus: Ansonia
- Species: A. teneritas

Binomial name
- Ansonia teneritas Waser et al., 2016

Species of amphibian

Ansonia teneritas, the gracile slender toad, is a species of toad in the family Bufonidae, described in 2016. It is endemic to central Sarawak in Malaysian Borneo and is only known from two isolated mountain ridges. Its name is derived from its slender body.

== Description ==
Adult males measure 19–22 mm (0.7–0.9 in) and adult females 21–24 mm (0.8–0.9 in) in snout–vent length. The overall appearance is slender. The snout is rounded and protruding. The tympanum is distinct. The canthus rostralis is rounded. The limbs are long and slender. The finger tips are slightly expanded to small, spatulate discs. The toe are partially webbed and have rounded tips. Skin bears scattered, isolated, flat, rounded warts of various sizes. Coloration is olive-green with a contrasting dark brown pattern of irregular spots and bands, in many specimens forming an "X" between the eyes, on forehead, and on shoulders. Larger warts on the dorsum are yellow to orange. There are whitish warts ventrolaterally on the flanks and from the jaw joint to the shoulder, and an irregular whitish spot below the eye on the upper lip. The limbs are dark brown and bear yellow crossbars. The venter is pale yellowish white with brown mottling (particularly on throat and chest), and interspersed with whitish tubercles. The iris is bright red-orange and has an irregular network of black reticulations.

== Habitat and conservation ==
Specimens from the type locality were collected at night from rocks or low vegetation along a small stream within primary lower montane forest at about 1,002 m (3,287 ft) above sea level. At the other known locality, a single specimen was found on low vegetation by a deeply entrenched small stream in a selectively logged secondary forest at 1,104 m (3,622 ft). These sites are offered some protection from logging by their high elevation and extremely rugged topography. The type locality is in the Usun Apau National Park.
