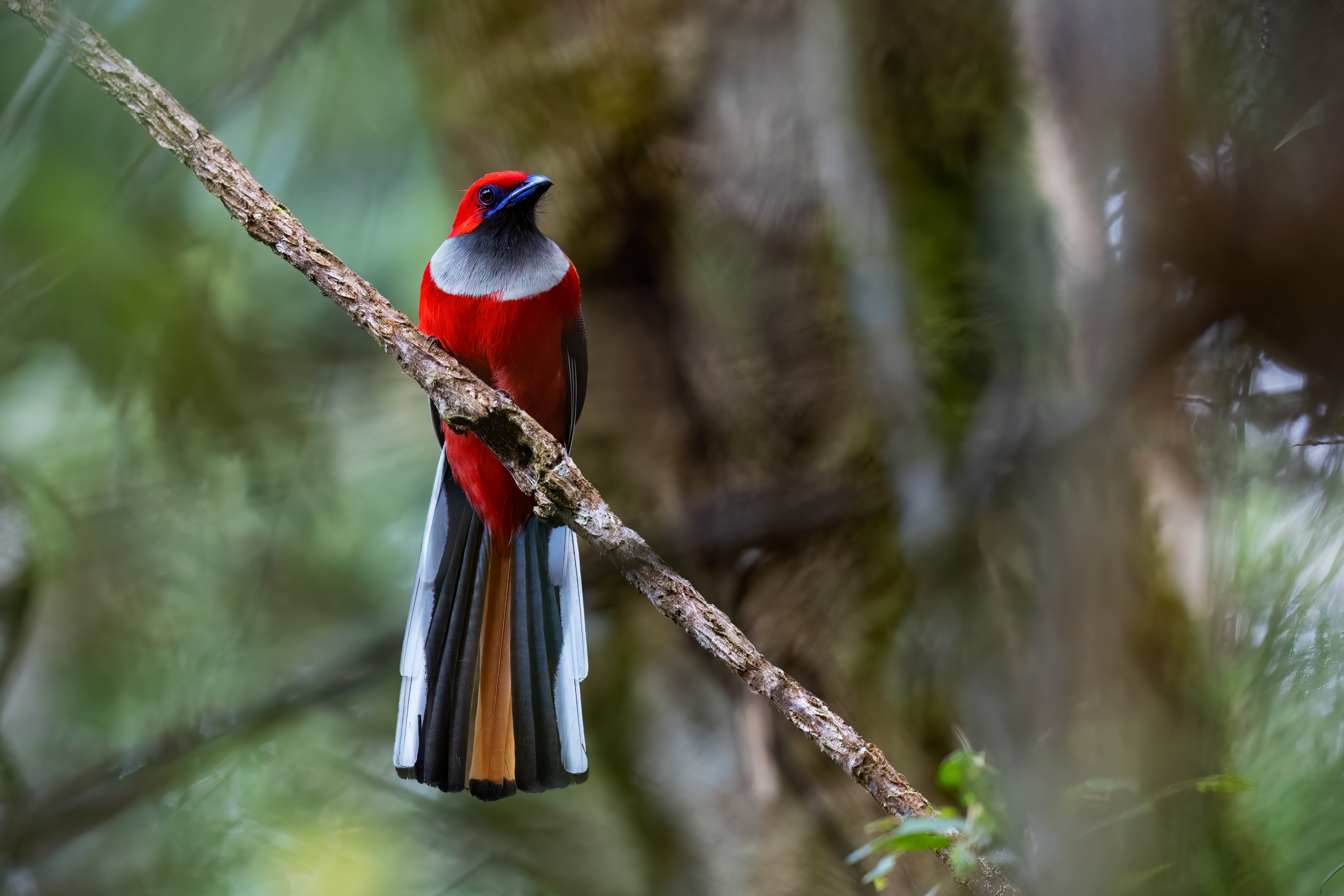

Conservation status
- Least Concern (IUCN 3.1)

Scientific classification
- Kingdom: Animalia
- Phylum: Chordata
- Class: Aves
- Order: Trogoniformes
- Family: Trogonidae
- Genus: Harpactes
- Species: H. whiteheadi

Binomial name
- Harpactes whiteheadi Sharpe, 1888

= Whitehead's trogon =

Species of bird

Whitehead's trogon (Harpactes whiteheadi) is a species of bird in the family Trogonidae. It is endemic to the island of Borneo, where it is an uncommon resident in primary mountain forest. One of Borneo's largest trogons at 29 to 33 cm (11 to 13 in) long, it is sexually dimorphic. The male is crimson on the head, nape, and underparts, with a black throat and grey chest; the rest of his upperparts are cinnamon-coloured. The female is similarly patterned, but cinnamon-brown where the male is scarlet. The species was first described for science by Richard Bowdler Sharpe in 1888, who named it for British explorer and collector John Whitehead. There are no subspecies.

It is primarily an insectivore, but also eats various plant materials, including fruits and seeds. Other than the timing of its breeding—typically between April and June—little is known about its breeding biology. The International Union for Conservation of Nature rates Whitehead's trogon as a near-threatened species. While its population numbers have not been quantified, the trogon is thought to be declining. Habitat loss is a key threat.

== Taxonomy and etymology ==
English ornithologist Richard Bowdler Sharpe first described Whitehead's trogon for science in 1888, using a specimen collected on Mount Kinabalu, in the Malaysian state of Sabah. He gave it the scientific name Harpactes whiteheadi, assigning it to the genus containing other Asian trogons. There are no subspecies. Molecular studies indicate that it is most closely related to the Philippine trogon.

The genus name Harpactes is a transcription of the Greek word harpaktes, meaning "robber". The species and common names honor the British explorer John Whitehead, who first collected the bird.

== Description ==
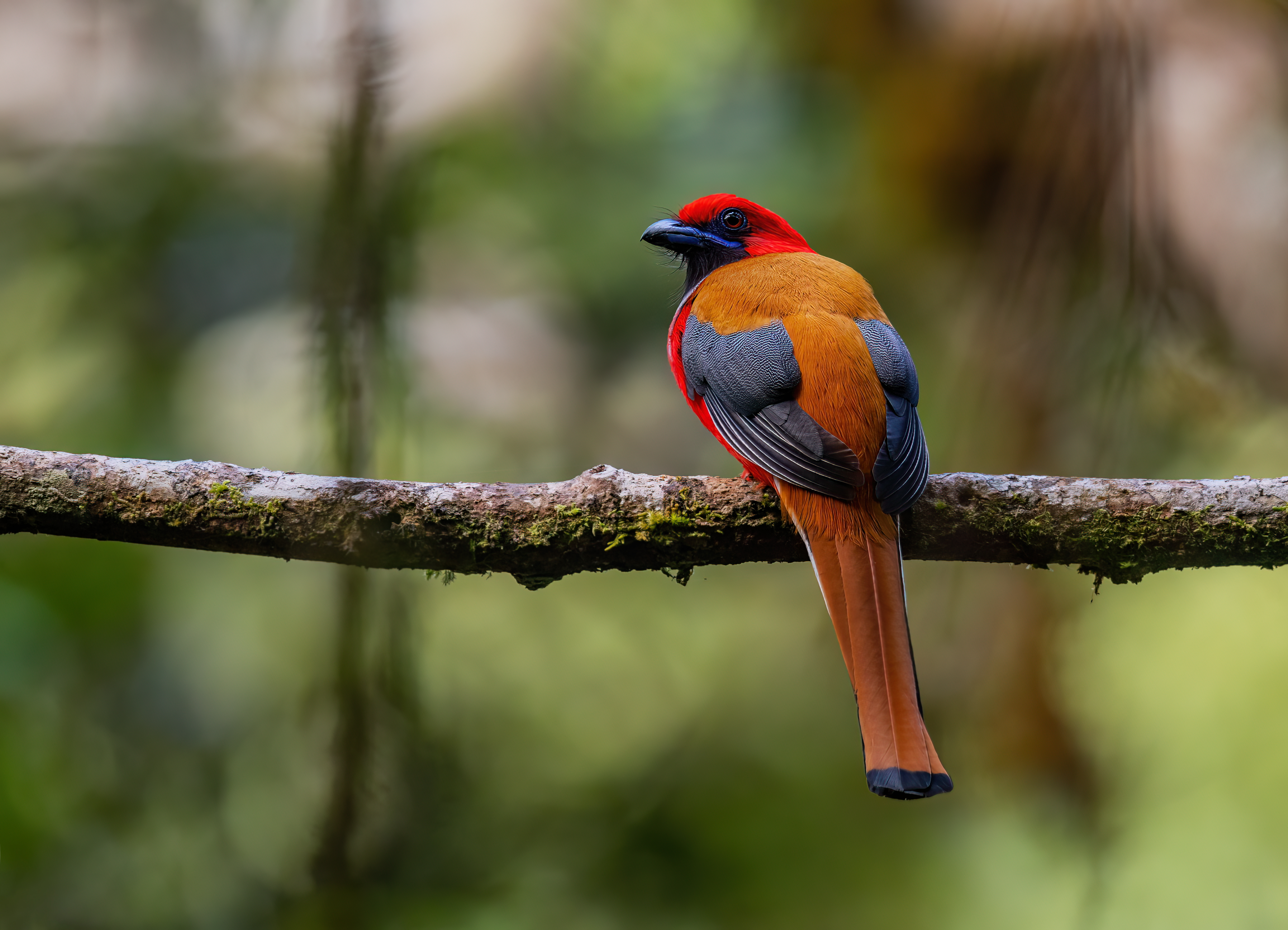
Male

Like most trogons, Whitehead's trogon is sexually dimorphic; the male is considerably more colorful than the female. It ranks among Borneo's largest trogons, measuring 29 to 33 cm (11 to 13 in) in length. (Note: By convention, length is measured from the tip of the bill to the tip of the tail on a dead bird (or skin) laid on its back.) The male is crimson on the forehead, crown, nape, and sides of the head, with bare blue skin around the eyes. The rest of his upperparts are cinnamon-brown. His throat is black, shading into a grey breast, but the rest of his underparts are crimson. His wings are primarily black, with fine white barring on the secondaries and coverts. His tail is mostly white underneath; above, the two central tail feathers are cinnamon with a broad black tip, and the remaining tail feathers are primarily black. The outermost tail feathers are white on the terminal half and along the outer web. He has a blue beak, pinkish-brown legs and feet, and reddish-brown irises. The female is similarly patterned, but duller, with cinnamon-brown replacing the crimson of the male. The barring on her secondaries and wing coverts is cinnamon-brown rather than white. The immature female is similar to the adult female, but her entire ventral side is uniformly coloured, lacking the adult's black throat and grey upper breast. She also has less blue coloring on her beak.

=== Voice ===
Whitehead's trogon vocalises only rarely. Its song is a loud series of four to five harsh, slow notes, evenly pitched and variously transcribed as "kwau kwau kwau kwau", "wark wark wark wark", or "poop poop poop poop". It also has a rolling "burr" call, which is sometimes followed by a loud, descending "kekekeke".

== Distribution and habitat ==
Whitehead's trogon is endemic to the island of Borneo, where it occurs in mountainous areas between 900 and 2,000 metres (3,000 and 6,600 ft) in elevation. Restricted to primary forest, it favours damp valleys. It is an uncommon and poorly-known resident species.

== Behaviour ==
A shy and unobtrusive bird, Whitehead's trogon is easy to overlook as it sits quietly in the upper storey of dense forest. It is resident where it occurs. It associates loosely with mixed species flocks containing chestnut-hooded and Sunda laughingthrushes, Whitehead's broadbills and Sunda cuckooshrikes.

=== Feeding ===
Like all trogons, Whitehead's trogon feeds primarily on insects, which it captures in sallying flight from a perch, or gleans from foliage. Most of this prey is fairly large, including grasshoppers, locusts, stick insects, and leaf insects; however, insects as small as ants are taken. It also eats fruit, seeds and other plant material. Though it generally perches just under the canopy, it typically hunts in the understorey. In the mixed flocks it accompanies, it usually hunts at lower levels than the other species do. Individuals have been found with stones in their stomachs.

=== Breeding ===
Very little is known about the Whitehead trogon's breeding ecology. Birds have been found in breeding condition in late March and October; the latter date suggests the possibility of multiple broods or geographical variation in the breeding period. Nesting is known to occur in April, young birds have been collected in June, and family groups have been seen together in July. However, the nest and eggs remain undescribed, and details of its breeding biology—incubation and nesting periods, size of clutch, length of time to fledging, division of nestling care, and so forth—are not known.

== Conservation ==
The International Union for Conservation of Nature has rated Whitehead's trogon as Least Concern due to its large range and slow rate of population decline. Although its population has not been quantified, the estimated loss over the last ten years does not approach the qualifications for Vulnerable status. Habitat loss, both from logging and conversion to agricultural use, is occurring at lower elevations on some of mountains where it lives.
