= John Whitehead (explorer) =

English explorer and naturalist (1860–1899)

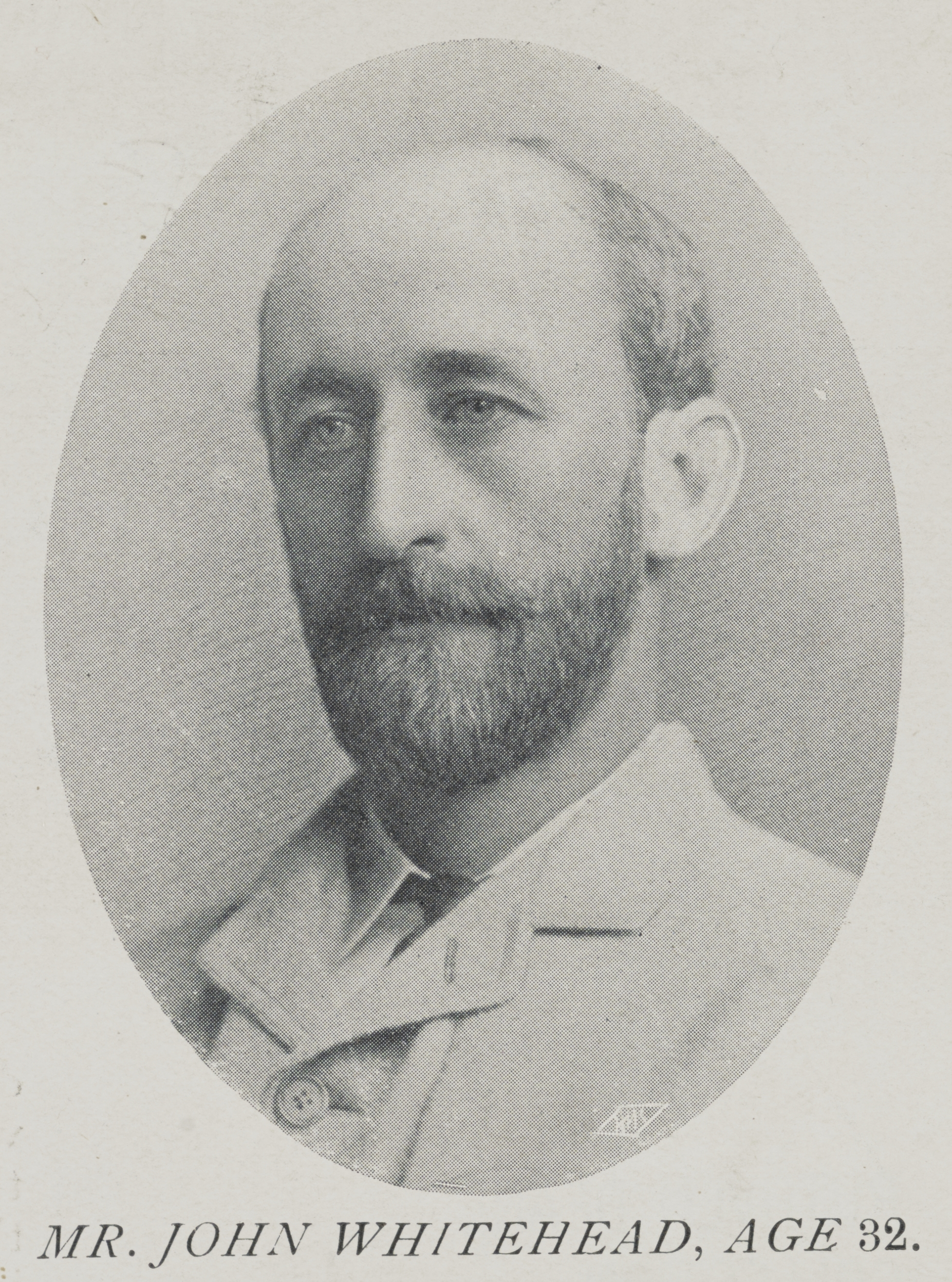
Portrait at age 32 from Country Life

John Whitehead (30 June 1860 – 2 June 1899) was an English explorer, naturalist and professional collector of natural history specimens in Southeast Asia. He is the first documented person to reach the summit of Mount Kinabalu: this was in 1888, after annual attempts from 1885.

Whitehead was born in Colney Hatch Lane, Muswell Hill, Middlesex to Jeffery Whitehead, a stockbroker, and his wife Jane Ashton Tinker. After education at Elstree, Hertfordshire and the Edinburgh Institution he faced health problems and was sent to recuperate to Engadine in Switzerland in 1881 and then to warm Corsica in 1882 where he discovered a bird new to science, the Corsican nuthatch.

Whitehead travelled in Malacca, North Borneo, Java, and Palawan between 1885 and 1888, where he collected a number of zoological specimens new to science, including 45 new species of bird such as Whitehead's broadbill (Calyptomena whiteheadi), writing up his experiences in a book on his return. Between 1893 and 1896 he explored in the Philippines, again collecting many new species, including the Philippine eagle, the binomial name of which commemorates Whitehead's father Jeffery, who funded his expeditions.

Several species are named after Whitehead:

- Whitehead's woolly bat Kerivoula whiteheadi
- Harpy fruit bat Harpyionycteris whiteheadi
- Whitehead's spiny rat Maxomys whiteheadi
- Luzon striped rat Chrotomys whiteheadi
- Tufted pygmy squirrel Exilisciurus whiteheadi
- Whitehead's Borneo frog - Meristogenys whiteheadi
- White-winged magpie Urocissa whiteheadi
- Whitehead's broadbill Calyptomena whiteheadi
- Whitehead's trogon Harpactes whiteheadi
- Whitehead's spiderhunter Arachnothera juliae
- Spotted Wood-owl Strix seloputo, formerly Surnia whiteheadi
- Whitehead's swiftlet Collocalia whiteheadi
- Bornean stubtail Urosphena whiteheadi
- Chestnut-faced babbler Zosterornis whiteheadi
- Corsican nuthatch Sitta whiteheadi
- Hainan silver pheasant Lophura nycthemera whiteheadi

Whitehead intended to return to the Philippines in 1899, but was he was forced to alter his plans because of the Spanish–American War. He instead travelled to the island of Hainan, where he died of fever at port of Hoihow (Haikou).
