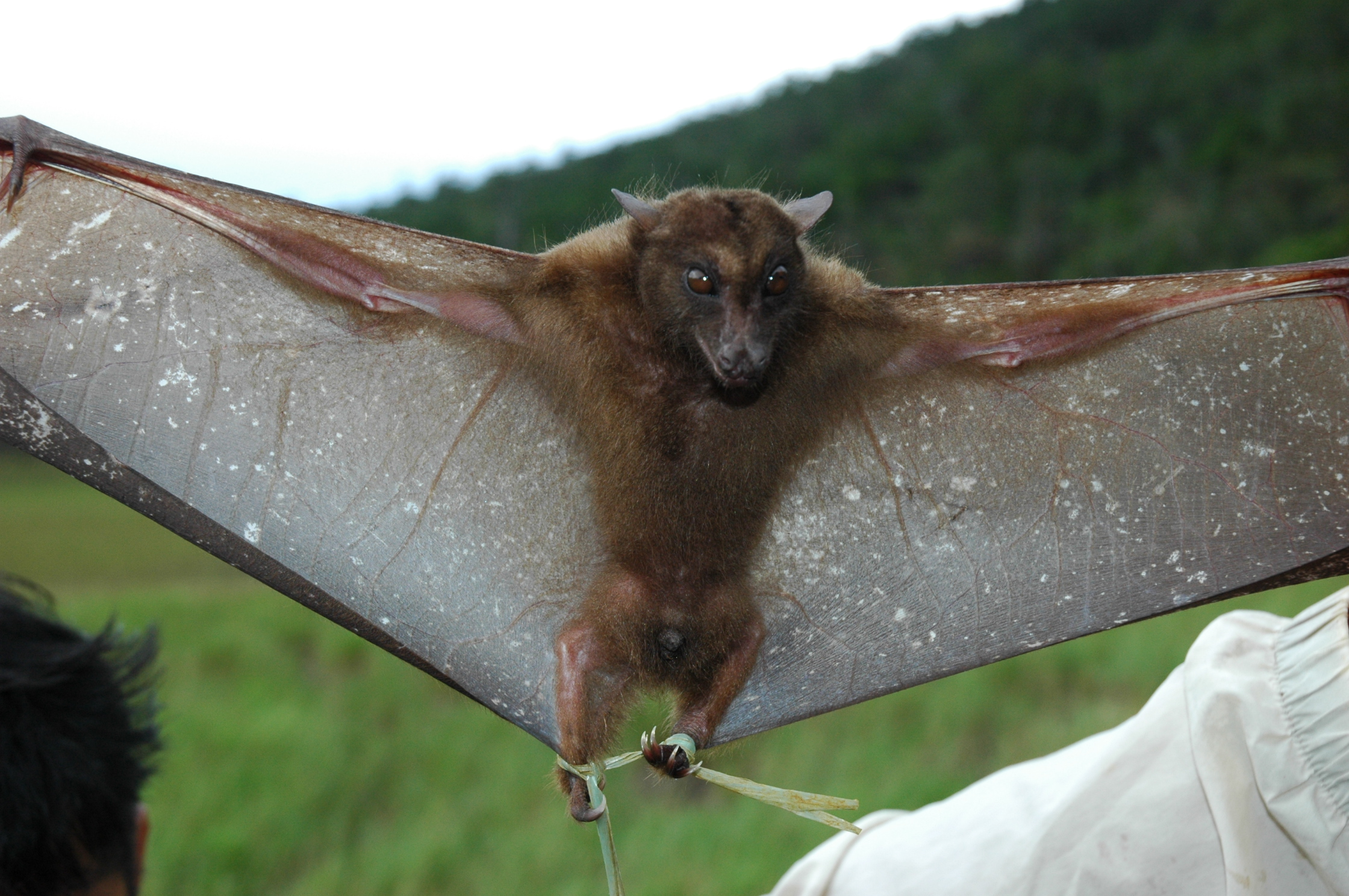
- Harpyionycteris whiteheadi

Scientific classification
- Kingdom: Animalia
- Phylum: Chordata
- Class: Mammalia
- Order: Chiroptera
- Family: Pteropodidae
- Genus: Harpyionycteris; Thomas, 1896

Type species
- Harpyionycteris whiteheadi Thomas, 1896

Species
- Harpyionycteris whiteheadi Harpyionycteris celebensis

= Harpyionycteris =

Genus of bats

Harpyionycteris is a genus of megabat in the family Pteropodidae. It contains the following species:

- Harpy fruit bat, Harpyionycteris whiteheadi
- Sulawesi harpy fruit bat, Harpyionycteris celebensis
