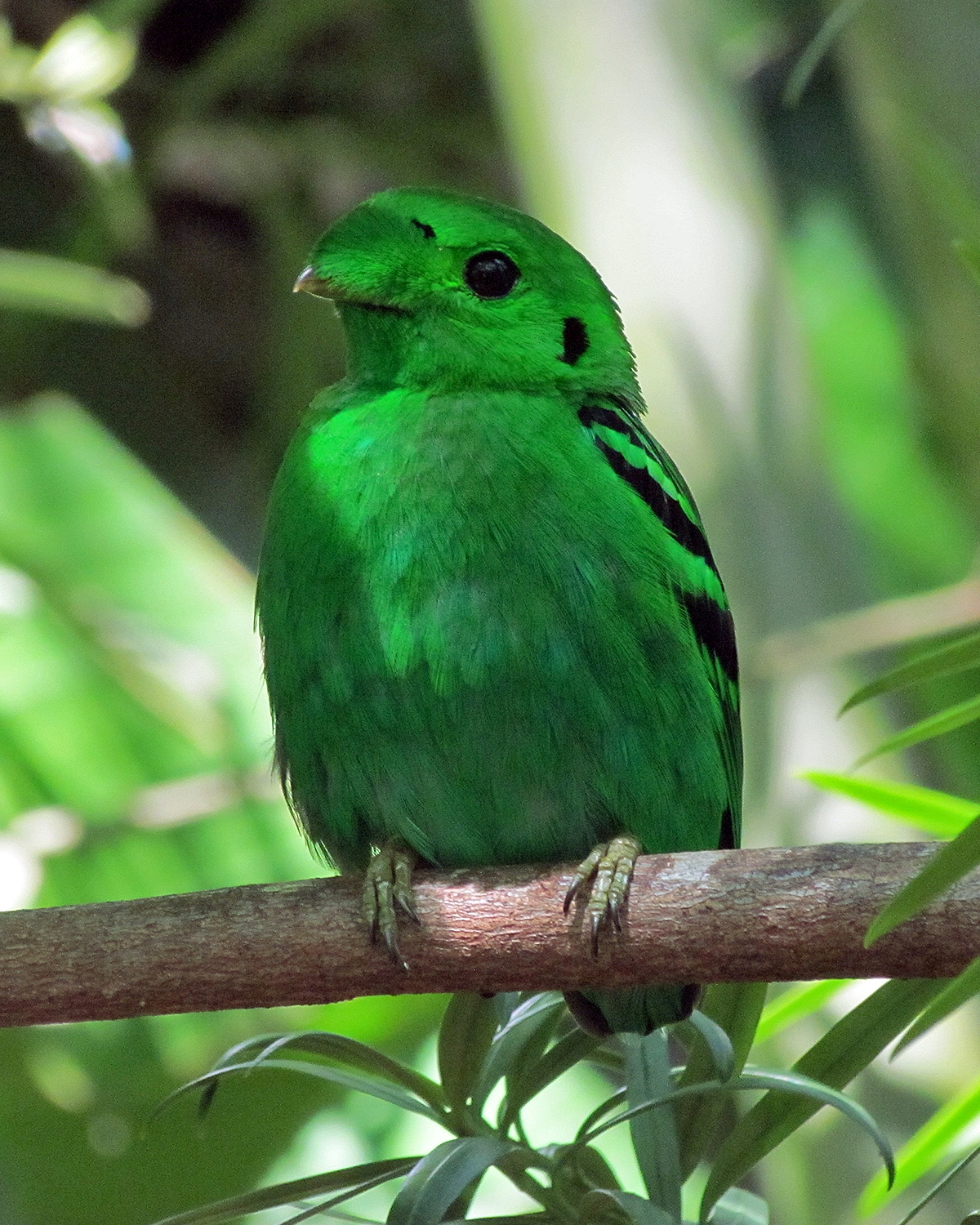
- Green broadbill (Calyptomena viridis)

Scientific classification
- Kingdom: Animalia
- Phylum: Chordata
- Class: Aves
- Order: Passeriformes
- Clade: Eupasseres
- Suborder: Tyranni
- Infraorder: Eurylaimides
- Family: Calyptomenidae; Bonaparte, 1850

= Calyptomenidae =

Family of birds

Calyptomenidae is a family of passerine birds found in Africa, the Malay Peninsula, and Borneo. There are six species in two genera.

The species in this family were formerly included in the broadbill family Eurylaimidae. A molecular phylogenetic study published in 2006 found that the species in these two genera were not closely related to the other broadbills. These two genera are now placed in a separate family.

== Genera ==
The family contains six species in two genera:

Image	Genus	Living species
	Smithornis Bonaparte, 1850	African broadbill (Smithornis capensis); Grey-headed broadbill (Smithornis sharpei); Rufous-sided broadbill (Smithornis rufolateralis)
	Calyptomena Horsfield, 1822	Green broadbill (Calyptomena viridis); Hose's broadbill (Calyptomena hosii); Whitehead's broadbill (Calyptomena whiteheadi)
