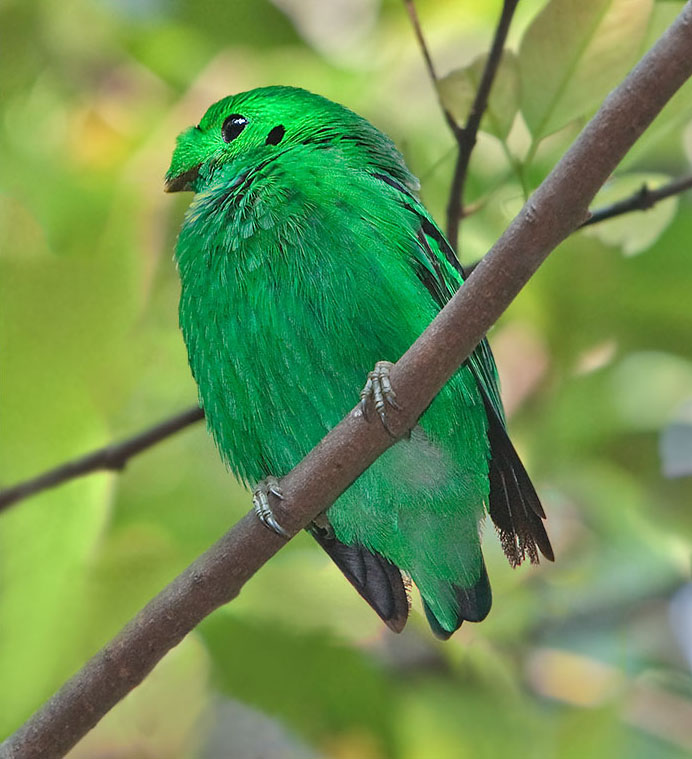
- Green broadbill, (Calyptomena viridis)

Scientific classification
- Kingdom: Animalia
- Phylum: Chordata
- Class: Aves
- Order: Passeriformes
- Family: Calyptomenidae
- Genus: Calyptomena; Horsfield, 1822

Type species
- Calyptomena viridis Horsfield, 1822

= Calyptomena =

Genus of birds

Calyptomena is a genus containing three green birds in the broadbill family Calyptomenidae that are found in Southeast Asia.

== Taxonomy ==
The genus name Calyptomena was introduced in 1822 by the American naturalist Thomas Horsfield. The name was also introduced in the same year by Stamford Raffles, but Horsfield's work was published in June 1822 and has priority over Raffles' article, which was published in November 1822. The genus name combines Ancient Greek kaluptos meaning "covered" with mēnē meaning "moon".

== Species ==
The genus contains three species.

Genus Calyptomena – Horsfield, 1822 – two species
| Common name | Scientific name and subspecies | Range | Size and ecology | IUCN status and estimated population |
|---|---|---|---|---|
| Green broadbill | Calyptomena viridis Raffles, 1822 Three subspecies: C. v. viridis Raffles, 1822 - the Malay Peninsula, extirpated from Singapore; C. v. gloriosa Deignan, 1947 - Sumatra, Borneo, Nias, the Lingga Islands, and the Natuna Islands; C. v. siberu Chasen & Kloss, 1926 - Mentawai Islands | Borneo, Sumatra, and the Malay Peninsula | Size: Habitat: Diet: | NT |
| Hose's broadbill | Calyptomena hosii Sharpe, 1892 | northern Borneo | Size: Habitat: Diet: | NT |
| Whitehead's broadbill | Calyptomena whiteheadi Sharpe, 1887 | northern Borneo. | Size: Habitat: Diet: | LC |

All three species are primarily green, and all are found in Borneo. The larger two species, Hose's and Whitehead's, are endemic to the island, while the smaller green broadbill is also found in Sumatra and on the Malay Peninsula.
