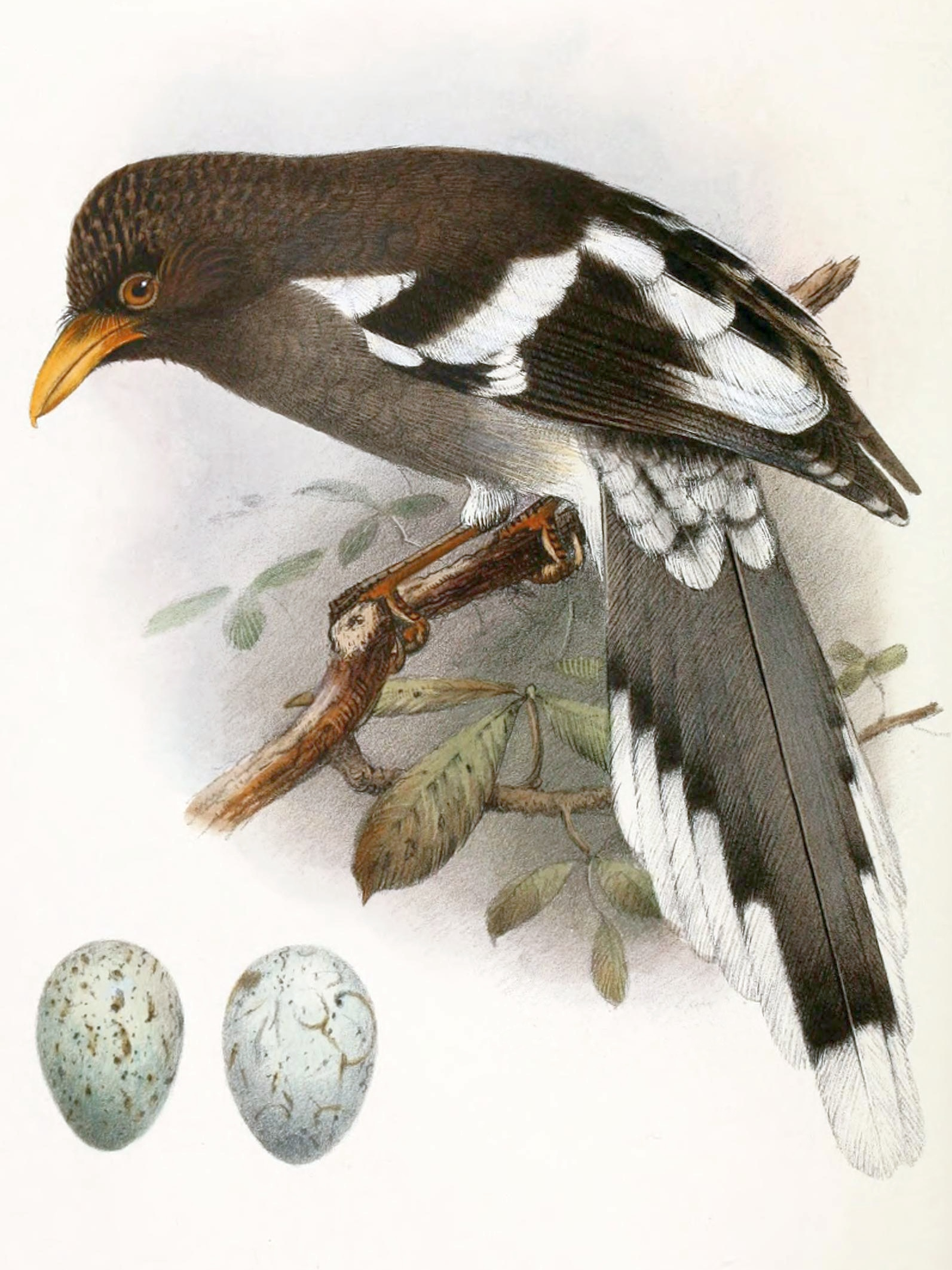
- Illustration by Henrik Grønvold in 1910

Conservation status
- Near Threatened (IUCN 3.1)

Scientific classification
- Kingdom: Animalia
- Phylum: Chordata
- Class: Aves
- Order: Passeriformes
- Family: Corvidae
- Genus: Urocissa
- Species: U. whiteheadi

Binomial name
- Urocissa whiteheadi Ogilvie-Grant, 1899

Synonyms
- Cissopica whiteheadi

= White-winged magpie =

Species of bird

The white-winged magpie or Hainan magpie (Urocissa whiteheadi) is a passerine bird of the crow family, Corvidae. It is unusual among the members of its genus in that it is black and white, lacking the blue plumage other Urocissa magpies have. Thus, it is sometimes placed in its own monotypic genus, Cissopica, though it appears to have sufficient features to remain in the genus Urocissa. There are two subspecies, the nominate whiteheadi being found in Hainan and xanthomelana found in southern China, northern Vietnam, and north and central Laos. The two subspecies are distinctive and may merit specific status; further research is needed.

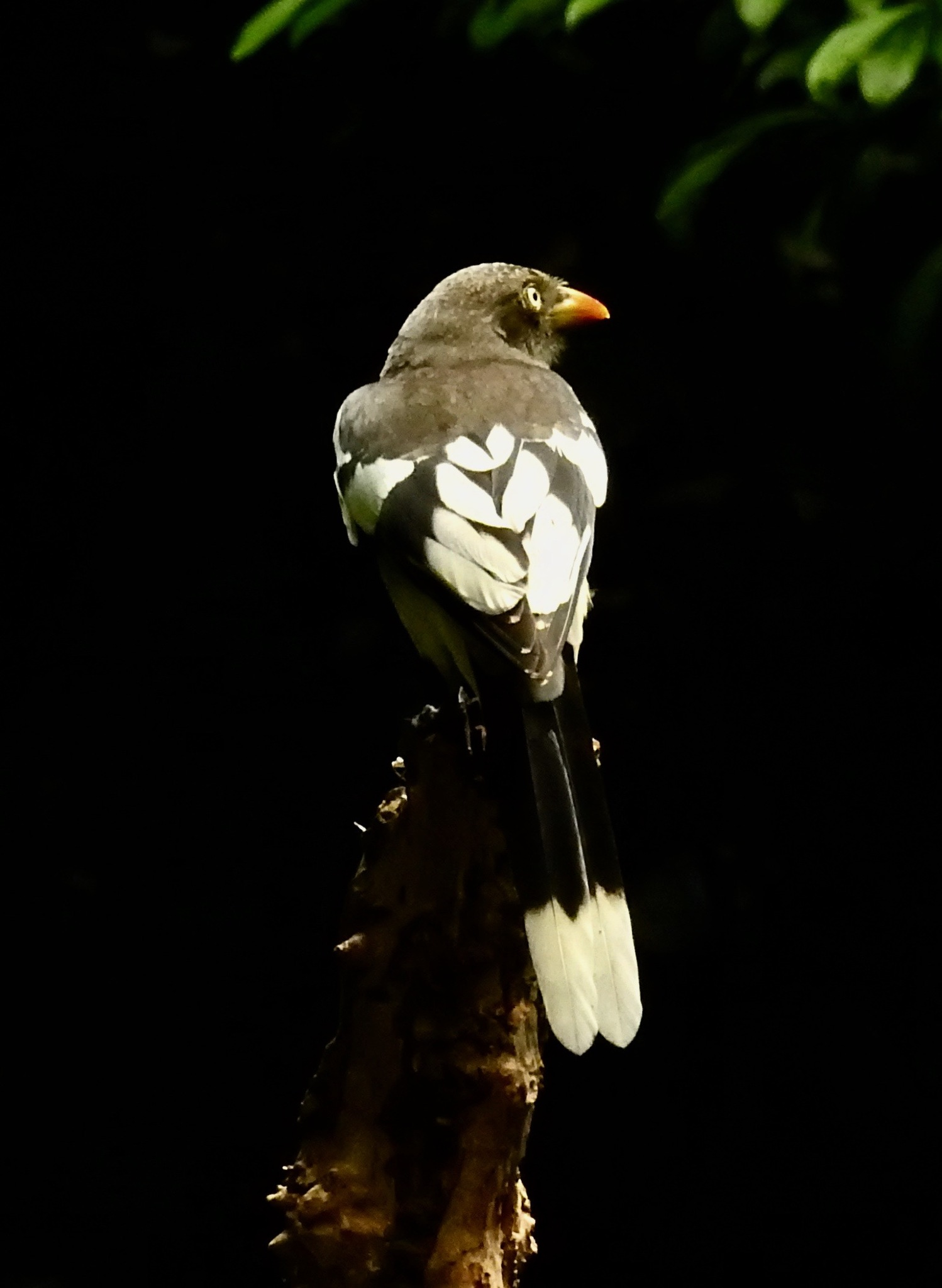
Live bird

The binomial commemorates the British explorer John Whitehead.
