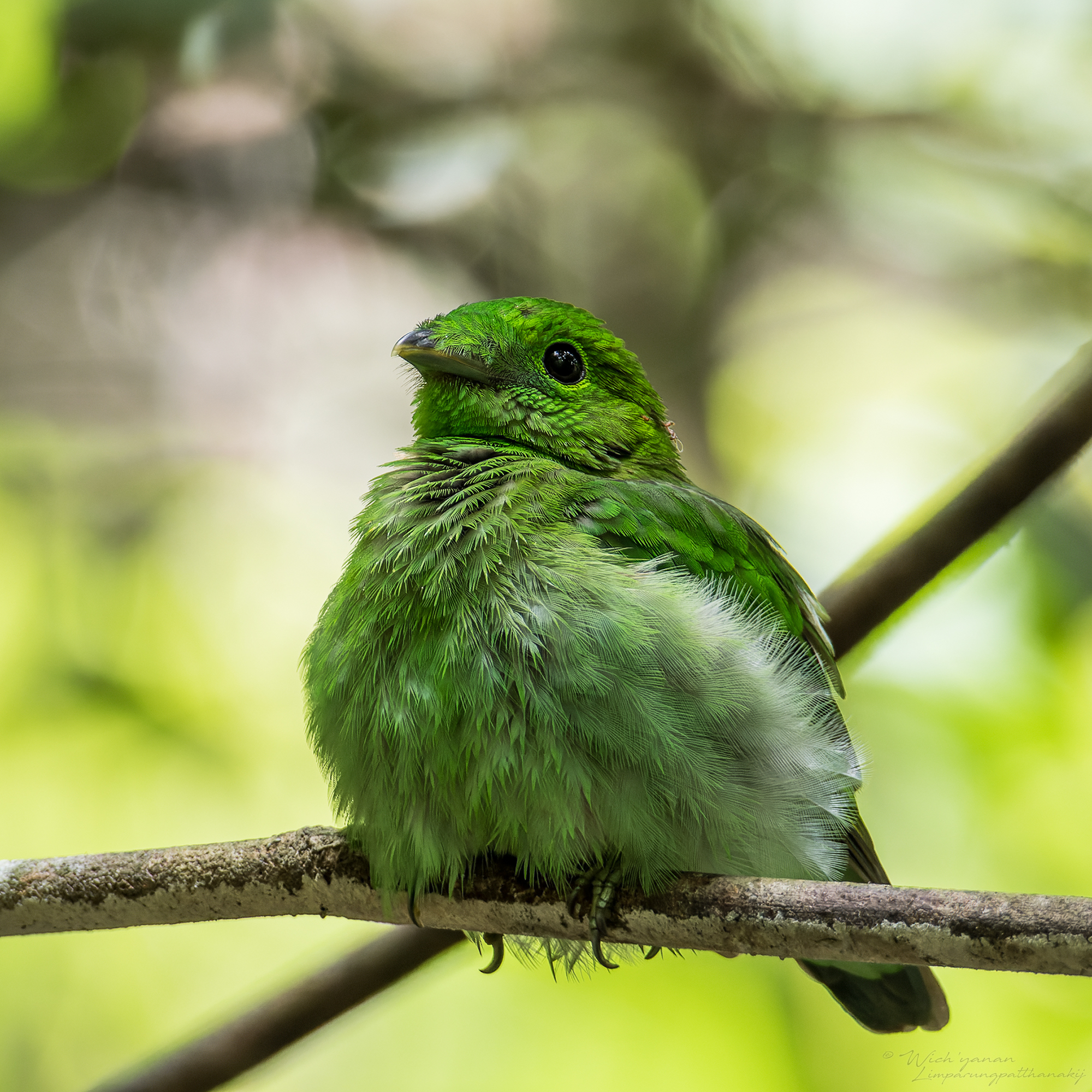

Conservation status
- Near Threatened (IUCN 3.1)

Scientific classification
- Kingdom: Animalia
- Phylum: Chordata
- Class: Aves
- Order: Passeriformes
- Family: Calyptomenidae
- Genus: Calyptomena
- Species: C. viridis

Binomial name
- Calyptomena viridis Raffles, 1822
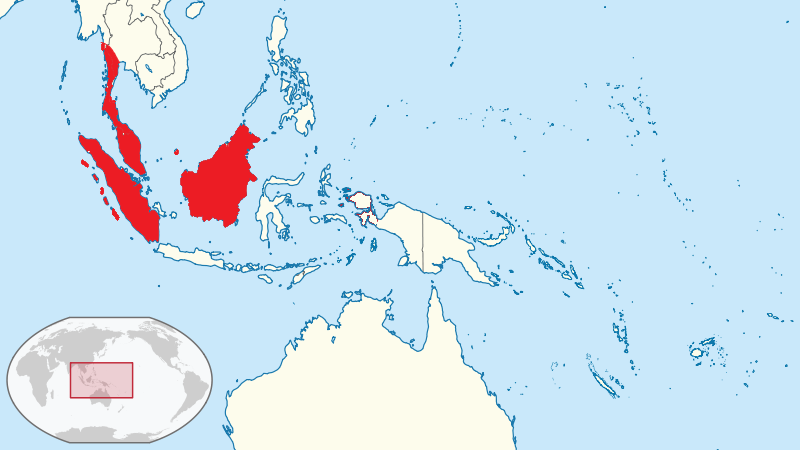

= Green broadbill =

Species of bird

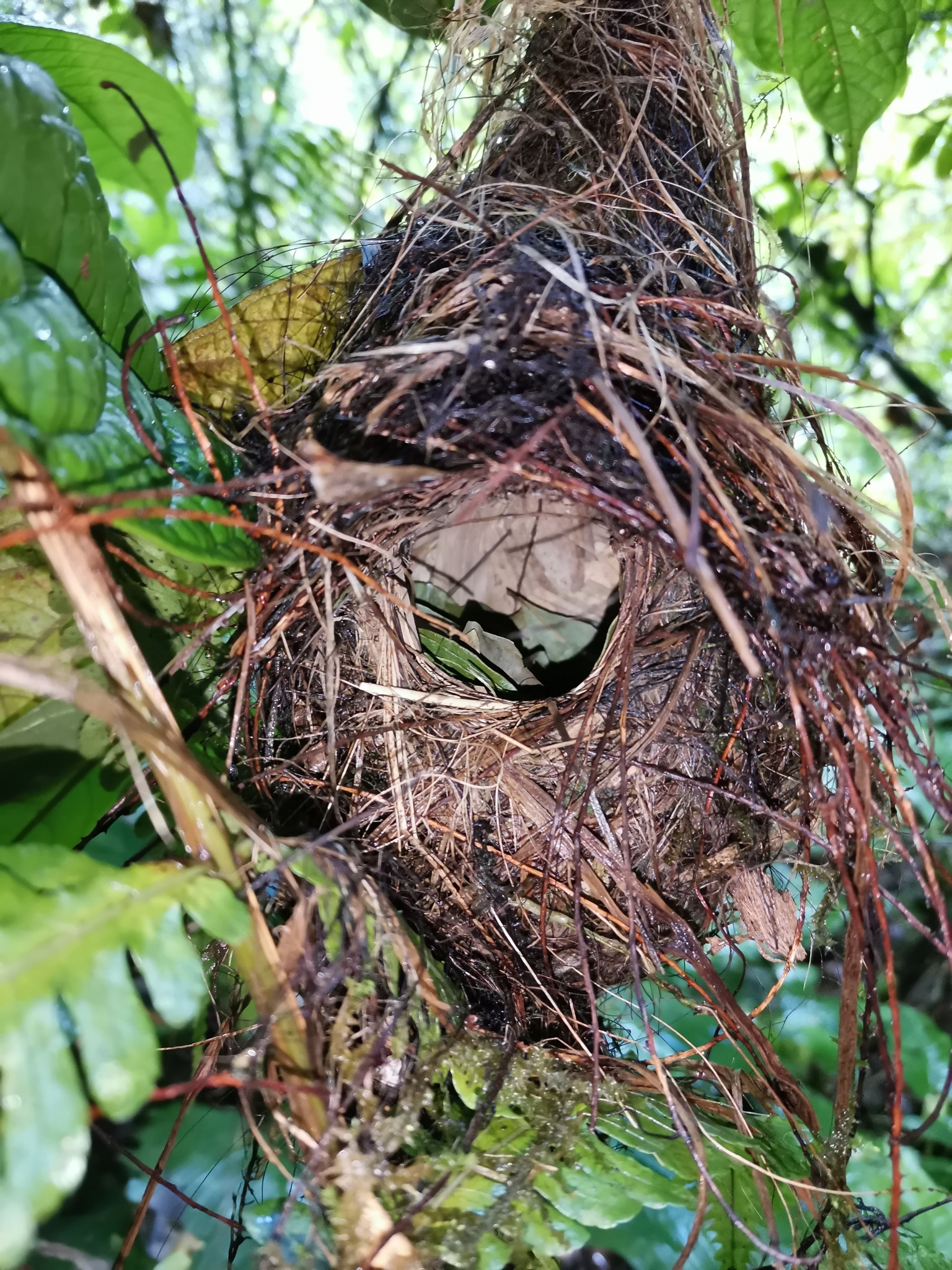
Nest

The green broadbill (Calyptomena viridis) also known as the Asian green broadbill or the lesser green broadbill is a small bird in the family Calyptomenidae. It was formerly classified in the family Eurylaimidae, a group of closely related birds that share the name "broadbill".

== Taxonomy ==
There are three subspecies recognized:

- Calyptomena viridis viridis Raffles, 1822 - the Malay Peninsula, extirpated from Singapore
- Calyptomena viridis gloriosa Deignan, 1947 - Sumatra, Borneo, Nias, the Lingga Islands, and the Natuna Islands
- Calyptomena viridis siberu Chasen & Kloss, 1926 - Mentawai Islands

Prior to revisions by the International Ornithological Congress in 2022, the mainland subspecies went by the name caudacuta, while viridis referred to the Greater Sundaic subspecies. Based on several previous studies finding problems with this nomenclature, the International Ornithological Congress replaced caudacuta with viridis, while gloriosa replaced the former viridis.

== Distribution and habitat ==
The green broadbill is distributed in broadleaved evergreen forests of Borneo, Sumatra, and the Malay Peninsula where it frequents lowland and lower montane rainforest.

== Description ==
The bird is about 17 cm long, plumaged in brilliant green with a black ear patch, widely gaped bill, rounded head, short tail and three black bars on each wing. The beak itself is very weak and almost hidden by the crest above it. Both sexes are similar. The female is duller and has no black markings on its ear patch and wing coverts.

== Behaviour ==
It is often overlooked, as it sits motionless inside the canopy or just below, quickly flying to a new location if disturbed. Its foliage-green color provides excellent camouflage.

It feeds largely on soft figs. The broadbill's feeding habits helps to distribute the seeds of the fig around the forest floor. The female usually lays between two and three whitish eggs, and the young fledge after twenty-two to twenty-three days.

== Status and conservation ==
Although this species remains common in many parts of its large range, it is considered Near Threatened as it is sensitive to habitat loss and degradation, which are likely to be causing population declines throughout its range. Due to continuing habitat loss, the green broadbill is evaluated as Near Threatened on the IUCN Red List of Threatened Species.
