= Sulawesi harpy fruit bat =

Conservation status
- Near Threatened (IUCN 3.1)

Scientific classification
- Kingdom: Animalia
- Phylum: Chordata
- Class: Mammalia
- Order: Chiroptera
- Family: Pteropodidae
- Genus: Harpyionycteris
- Species: H. celebensis

Binomial name
- Harpyionycteris celebensis Miller & Hollister, 1921
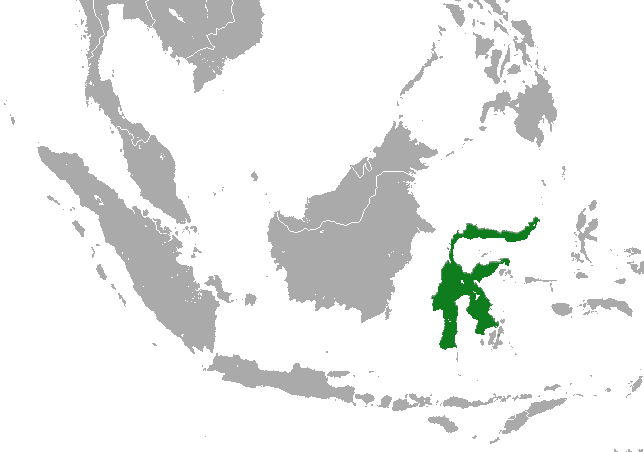

Species of bat

The Sulawesi harpy fruit bat (Harpyionycteris celebensis) is a species of megabat in the family Pteropodidae. It is endemic to Indonesia where it is found in Sulawesi and in Soloi on Buton island.

The Sulawesi harpy fruit bat is frugivorous and lives around high quality forest habitats with heightened elevation. Documents of specimens being in cocoa plantations have been recorded. Currently, how this species roosts is unknown even with captured specimens.
