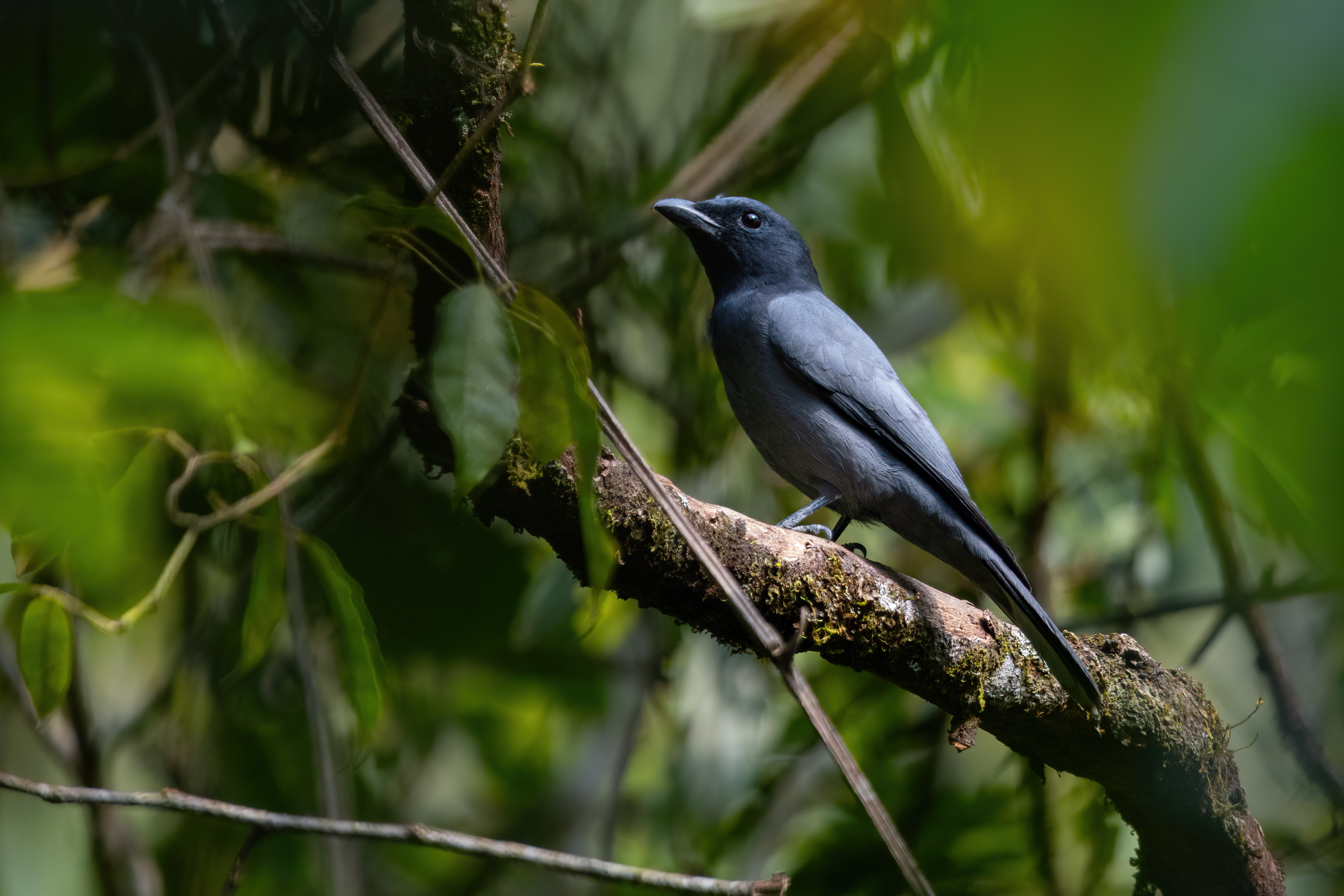

Conservation status
- Least Concern (IUCN 3.1)

Scientific classification
- Kingdom: Animalia
- Phylum: Chordata
- Class: Aves
- Order: Passeriformes
- Family: Campephagidae
- Genus: Coracina
- Species: C. larvata

Binomial name
- Coracina larvata (Müller, 1843)

= Sunda cuckooshrike =

Species of bird

The Sunda cuckooshrike (Coracina larvata) is a species of bird in the family Campephagidae. It is found in Indonesia and Malaysia, where it occurs on Borneo, Sumatra and Java. Its natural habitat is subtropical or tropical moist montane forest.
