= Kayan Mentarang National Park =

National park in Indonesia

- IUCN category II (national park)
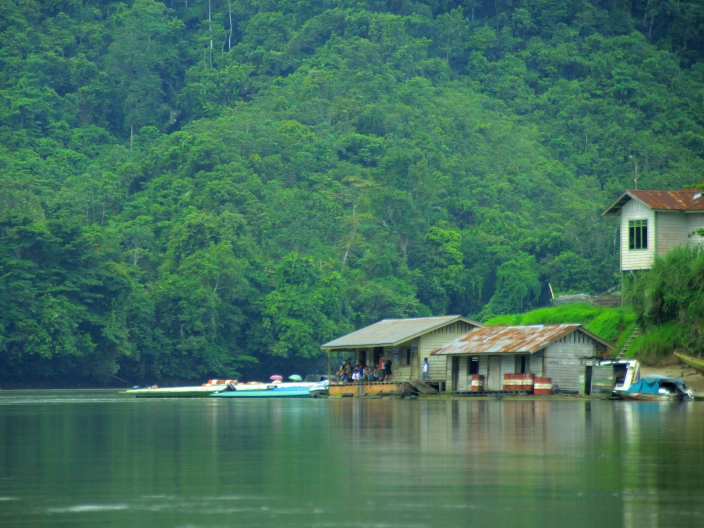
- Floating Gasoline Station on the Kayan River at Kayan Mentarang National Park

- Location within Borneo
- Location: Indonesia (North Kalimantan)
- Nearest city: Tarakan City
- Coordinates: 3°12′N 115°30′E
- Area: 13,605 km^{2} (5,253 sq mi)
- Established: 1996
- Governing body: Ministry of Forestry

Kayan Mentarang National Park (Indonesian: Taman Nasional Kayan Mentarang) is a densely forested national park located in the Indonesian province of North Kalimantan, on the island of Borneo. The national park is named after a great dispersed Mentarang mountain trails plateau of Apau Kayan which covers the entire park from Datadian area in south region to Apau Ping area in mid region until Long Bawan in north region.

== Geography ==
Kayan Mentarang National Park is located at the border between Indonesia and Malaysia. The park is central to the WWF Heart of Borneo initiative, which aims to protect the transboundary highlands of Borneo, which straddle the three Southeast Asian nations of Indonesia, Malaysia and Brunei Darussalam.

Until recently it has been difficult for tourists to enter this huge National Park, with difficulties often encountered at the local rural Malaysian-Indonesian border checkpoint. However, as the Heart of Borneo initiative has progressed agreements have been put in place which promotes movement of tourists into Kayan Mentarang National Park from Malaysia via Ba'kelalan in Sarawak, Malaysian Borneo.

== Ecology ==
Animals found in the park include the mammals such as Malayan pangolin, the long-tailed macaque, the proboscis monkey, the Bornean gibbon, the greater slow loris, the western tarsier, the clouded leopard, the marbled cat, the flat-headed cat, the Oriental small-clawed otter, the sun bear, and the Hose's palm civet.

Other protected species include the rhinoceros hornbill, the helmeted hornbill, Bulwer's pheasant, and the wrinkled hornbill.

== Human habitation ==
Archaeological remains in the park including stone tools and graves indicate that the area was inhabited over 350 years ago. Currently there are about 20,000-25,000 Dayak people living around the park, from various tribes including the Kenyah, Murut people, Punan, Lundayeh and Lun Bawang.

== See also ==
- List of national parks of Indonesia
- Geography of Indonesia
