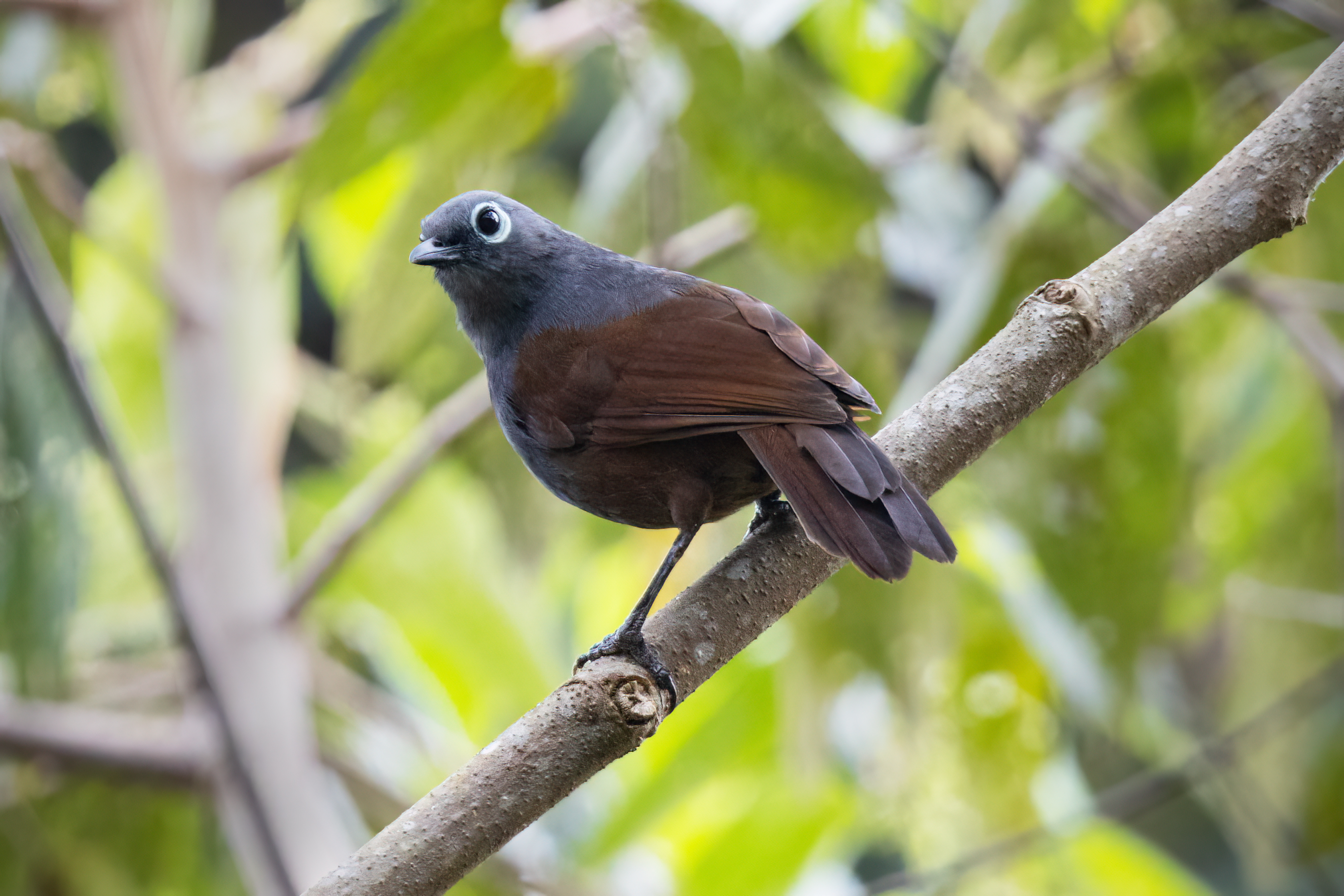

Conservation status
- Near Threatened (IUCN 3.1)

Scientific classification
- Kingdom: Animalia
- Phylum: Chordata
- Class: Aves
- Order: Passeriformes
- Family: Leiothrichidae
- Genus: Garrulax
- Species: G. palliatus

Binomial name
- Garrulax palliatus (Bonaparte, 1850)

= Sunda laughingthrush =

Species of bird

The Sunda laughingthrush (Garrulax palliatus) is a bird species in the family Leiothrichidae. It is found on the islands of Sumatra and Borneo in Brunei, Indonesia, and Malaysia.

Its natural habitats are subtropical or tropical moist lowland forests and subtropical or tropical moist montane forests. It is threatened by human activity such as hunting, logging, and trapping.

== Description ==
The length of its body is characterized as medium-sized, about 24–25 cm (9.4–9.8 in).

== Diet ==
The Sunda laughingthrush primarily eats insects (including beetles, moths, and caterpillars) and seeds.

== Subspecies ==
Two subspecies are recognized:

- Garrulax palliatus palliatus is native to the island of Sumatra, mostly in montane rain forests from 850 to 2,200 meters (2,790 to 7,220 ft) elevation.
- Garrulax palliatus schistochlamys is native to Borneo (Indonesia, Malaysia and Brunei), mostly in montane rain forest, and sometimes in submontane hill forest, from 300 to 2,010 meters (980 to 6,590 ft) elevation.
