= List of birds of Indonesia =

Indonesia, with its vast islands, tropical weather and rainforests is one of the world's richest and most important countries in terms of biodiversity. In addition to the many resident birds, a considerable number of migratory species winter in the country to escape their northern breeding grounds.

The avifauna of Indonesia include a total of 1809 species, of which 786 are endemic, and 3 have been introduced by humans. 150 species are globally threatened.

This list's taxonomic treatment (designation and sequence of orders, families and species) and nomenclature (common and scientific names) follow the conventions of The Clements Checklist of Birds of the World, 2022 edition. The family accounts at the beginning of each heading reflect this taxonomy, as do the species counts in each family account. Introduced and accidental species are included in the total counts for Indonesia.

The following tags have been used to highlight several categories. The commonly occurring native species do not fall into any of these categories.

- (A) Accidental - a species that rarely or accidentally occurs in Indonesia
- (E) Endemic - a species that is native only to Indonesia
- (Ex) Extirpated - a species that no longer occurs in Indonesia although populations exist elsewhere
- (I) Introduced - a species introduced to Indonesia as a consequence, direct or indirect, of human actions

== Cassowaries and emu ==
Order: Struthioniformes Family: Casuariidae

The cassowaries are large flightless birds native to Australia and New Guinea.

- Southern cassowary, Casuarius casuarius
- Dwarf cassowary, Casuarius bennetti
- Northern cassowary, Casuarius unappendiculatus

== Magpie goose ==
Order: Anseriformes Family: Anseranatidae

The family contains a single species, the magpie goose. It was an early and distinctive offshoot of the anseriform family tree, diverging after the screamers and before all other ducks, geese and swans, sometime in the late Cretaceous.

- Magpie goose, Anseranas semipalmata

== Ducks, geese, and waterfowl ==
Order: Anseriformes Family: Anatidae

Anatidae includes the ducks and most duck-like waterfowl, such as geese and swans. These birds are adapted to an aquatic existence with webbed feet, flattened bills, and feathers that are excellent at shedding water due to an oily coating.

- Spotted whistling-duck, Dendrocygna guttata
- Plumed whistling-duck, Dendrocygna eytoni (A)
- Wandering whistling-duck, Dendrocygna arcuata
- Lesser whistling-duck, Dendrocygna javanica
- Black swan, Cygnus atratus (A)
- Radjah shelduck, Radjah radjah
- Green pygmy-goose, Nettapus pulchellus
- Cotton pygmy-goose, Nettapus coromandelianus
- Salvadori's teal, Salvadorina waigiuensis
- Garganey, Spatula querquedula
- Eurasian wigeon, Mareca penelope (A)
- Pacific black duck, Anas superciliosa
- Mallard, Anas platyrhynchos (A)
- Northern pintail, Anas acuta (A)
- Sunda teal, Anas gibberifrons
- Gray teal, Anas gracilis
- White-winged duck, Asarcornis scutulata
- Hardhead, Aythya australis
- Tufted duck, Aythya fuligula (A)

== Megapodes ==
Order: Galliformes Family: Megapodiidae

The Megapodiidae are stocky, medium-large chicken-like birds with small heads and large feet. All but the malleefowl occupy jungle habitats and most have brown or black colouring.

- Wattled brushturkey, Aepypodius arfakianus
- Waigeo brushturkey, Aepypodius bruijnii (E)
- Red-billed brushturkey, Talegalla cuvieri (E)
- Yellow-legged brushturkey, Talegalla fuscirostris
- Red-legged brushturkey, Talegalla jobiensis
- Maleo, Macrocephalon maleo (E)
- Moluccan scrubfowl, Eulipoa wallacei (E)
- Tabon scrubfowl, Megapodius cumingii
- Sula scrubfowl, Megapodius bernsteinii (E)
- Tanimbar scrubfowl, Megapodius tenimberensis (E)
- Dusky scrubfowl, Megapodius freycinet (E)
- Biak scrubfowl, Megapodius geelvinkianus (E)
- Forsten's scrubfowl, Megapodius forsteni (E)
- New Guinea scrubfowl, Megapodius decollatus
- Orange-footed scrubfowl, Megapodius reinwardt

== Pheasants, grouse, and allies ==
Order: Galliformes Family: Phasianidae

The Phasianidae are a family of terrestrial birds. In general, they are plump (although they vary in size) and have broad, relatively short wings.

- Ferruginous partridge, Caloperdix oculea
- Crested partridge, Rollulus rouloul
- Black partridge, Melanoperdix niger
- Red-billed partridge, Arborophila rubrirostris (E)
- Red-breasted partridge, Arborophila hyperythra (E)
- Roll's partridge, Arborophila rolli
- Sumatran partridge, Arborophila sumatrana
- Chestnut-bellied partridge, Arborophila javanica (E)
- Gray-breasted partridge, Arborophila orientalis (E)
- Long-billed partridge, Rhizothera longirostris
- Dulit partridge, Rhizothera dulitensis
- Bulwer's pheasant, Lophura bulweri
- Malayan crestless fireback, Lophura erythrophthalma
- Bornean crestless fireback, Lophura pyronota
- Salvadori's pheasant, Lophura inornata (E)
- Malayan crested fireback, Lophura rufa
- Bornean crested fireback, Lophura ignita
- Great argus, Argusianus argus
- Green peafowl, Pavo muticus
- Chestnut-necklaced partridge, Tropicoperdix charltonii
- Sabah partridge, Tropicoperdix graydoni
- Crimson-headed partridge, Haematortyx sanguiniceps
- Bornean peacock-pheasant, Polyplectron schleiermacheri
- Bronze-tailed peacock-pheasant, Polyplectron chalcurum (E)
- Green junglefowl, Gallus varius (E)
- Red junglefowl, Gallus gallus
- Brown quail, Synoicus ypsilophorus
- Snow Mountain quail, Synoicus monorthonyx
- Blue-breasted quail, Synoicus chinensis

== Grebes ==
Order: Podicipediformes Family: Podicipedidae

Grebes are small to medium-large freshwater diving birds. They have lobed toes and are excellent swimmers and divers. Their feet are placed far back on the body, making them quite ungainly on land.

- Little grebe, Tachybaptus ruficollis
- Australasian grebe, Tachybaptus novaehollandiae
- Great crested grebe, Podiceps cristatus (A)

== Pigeons and doves ==
Order: Columbiformes Family: Columbidae

Pigeons and doves are stout-bodied birds with short necks and short slender bills with a fleshy cere.

- Rock pigeon, Columba livia
- Silvery wood-pigeon, Columba argentina (E)
- Metallic pigeon, Columba vitiensis
- Sunda collared-dove, Streptopelia bitorquata
- Red collared-dove, Streptopelia tranquebarica
- Spotted dove, Streptopelia chinensis
- Barred cuckoo-dove, Macropygia unchall
- Flores Sea cuckoo-dove, Macropygia macassariensis
- Timor cuckoo-dove, Macropygia magna (E)
- Tanimbar cuckoo-dove, Macropygia timorlaoensis (E)
- Amboyna cuckoo-dove, Macropygia amboinensis
- Sultan's cuckoo-dove, Macropygia doreya
- Philippine cuckoo-dove, Macropygia tenuirostris
- Ruddy cuckoo-dove, Macropygia emiliana
- Enggano cuckoo-dove, Macropygia cinnamomea (E)
- Barusan cuckoo-dove, Macropygia modiglianii (E)
- Black-billed cuckoo-dove, Macropygia nigrirostris
- Little cuckoo-dove, Macropygia ruficeps
- Great cuckoo-dove, Reinwardtoena reinwardti
- White-faced cuckoo-dove, Turacoena manadensis (E)
- Sula cuckoo-dove, Turacoena sulaensis
- Slaty cuckoo-dove, Turacoena modesta (E)
- Asian emerald dove, Chalcophaps indica
- Pacific emerald dove, Chalcophaps longirostris
- Stephan's dove, Chalcophaps stephani
- New Guinea bronzewing, Henicophaps albifrons
- Wetar ground dove, Alopecoenas hoedtii (E)
- Bronze ground dove, Alopecoenas beccarii
- White-bibbed ground dove, Alopecoenas jobiensis
- Zebra dove, Geopelia striata
- Peaceful dove, Geopelia placida
- Barred dove, Geopelia maugeus (E)
- Bar-shouldered dove, Geopelia humeralis
- Nicobar pigeon, Caloenas nicobarica
- Sulawesi ground dove, Gallicolumba tristigmata (E)
- Cinnamon ground dove, Gallicolumba rufigula
- Thick-billed ground-pigeon, Trugon terrestris
- Pheasant pigeon, Otidiphaps nobilis
- Western crowned-pigeon, Goura cristata
- Sclater's crowned-pigeon, Goura sclaterii
- Scheepmaker's crowned-pigeon, Goura scheepmakeri
- Victoria crowned-pigeon, Goura victoria
- Little green-pigeon, Treron olax
- Pink-necked green-pigeon, Treron vernans
- Cinnamon-headed green-pigeon, Treron fulvicollis
- Orange-breasted green-pigeon, Treron bicinctus
- Buru green-pigeon, Treron aromaticus
- Thick-billed green-pigeon, Treron curvirostra
- Gray-cheeked green-pigeon, Treron griseicauda (E)
- Sumba green-pigeon, Treron teysmannii (E)
- Flores green-pigeon, Treron floris (E)
- Timor green-pigeon, Treron psittaceus (E)
- Large green-pigeon, Treron capellei
- Green-spectacled green-pigeon, Treron oxyurus (E)
- Wedge-tailed green-pigeon, Treron sphenurus
- Black-backed fruit-dove, Ptilinopus cinctus (E)
- Red-naped fruit-dove, Ptilinopus dohertyi (E)
- Pink-headed fruit-dove, Ptilinopus porphyreus (E)
- Red-eared fruit-dove, Ptilinopus fischeri (E)
- Jambu fruit-dove, Ptilinopus jambu
- Maroon-chinned fruit-dove, Ptilinopus epius (E)
- Banggai fruit-dove, Ptilinopus subgularis (E)
- Sula fruit-dove, Ptilinopus mangoliensis (E)
- Scarlet-breasted fruit-dove, Ptilinopus bernsteinii (E)
- Wompoo fruit-dove, Ptilinopus magnificus
- Pink-spotted fruit-dove, Ptilinopus perlatus
- Ornate fruit-dove, Ptilinopus ornatus
- Orange-fronted fruit-dove, Ptilinopus aurantiifrons
- Wallace's fruit-dove, Ptilinopus wallacii (E)
- Superb fruit-dove, Ptilinopus superbus
- Rose-crowned fruit-dove, Ptilinopus regina
- Coroneted fruit-dove, Ptilinopus coronulatus
- Beautiful fruit-dove, Ptilinopus pulchellus
- Blue-capped fruit-dove, Ptilinopus monacha (E)
- White-breasted fruit-dove, Ptilinopus rivoli
- Yellow-bibbed fruit-dove, Ptilinopus solomonensis
- Geelvink fruit-dove, Ptilinopus speciosus (E)
- Claret-breasted fruit-dove, Ptilinopus viridis
- Orange-bellied fruit-dove, Ptilinopus iozonus
- Gray-headed fruit-dove, Ptilinopus hyogastrus (E)
- Carunculated fruit-dove, Ptilinopus granulifrons (E)
- Black-naped fruit-dove, Ptilinopus melanospilus
- Dwarf fruit-dove, Ptilinopus nainus
- White-bellied imperial-pigeon, Ducula forsteni (E)
- Gray-headed imperial-pigeon, Ducula radiata (E)
- Green imperial-pigeon, Ducula aenea
- Enggano imperial-pigeon, Ducula oenothorax (E)
- Spectacled imperial-pigeon, Ducula perspicillata (E)
- Seram imperial-pigeon, Ducula neglecta (E)
- Elegant imperial-pigeon, Ducula concinna (E)
- Spice imperial-pigeon, Ducula myristicivora (E)
- Geelvink imperial-pigeon, Ducula geelvinkiana (E)
- Purple-tailed imperial-pigeon, Ducula rufigaster
- Cinnamon-bellied imperial-pigeon, Ducula basilica (E)
- Rufescent imperial-pigeon, Ducula chalconota
- Pink-headed imperial-pigeon, Ducula rosacea (E)
- Gray imperial-pigeon, Ducula pickeringii
- Pinon's imperial-pigeon, Ducula pinon
- Collared imperial-pigeon, Ducula mullerii
- Zoe's imperial-pigeon, Ducula zoeae
- Mountain imperial-pigeon, Ducula badia
- Dark-backed imperial-pigeon, Ducula lacernulata (E)
- Timor imperial-pigeon, Ducula cineracea (E)
- Pied imperial-pigeon, Ducula bicolor
- Torresian imperial-pigeon, Ducula spilorrhoa
- Silver-tipped imperial-pigeon, Ducula luctuosa (E)
- Sombre pigeon, Cryptophaps poecilorrhoa (E)
- Papuan mountain-pigeon, Gymnophaps albertisii
- Buru mountain-pigeon, Gymnophaps mada (E)
- Seram mountain-pigeon, Gymnophaps stalkeri (E)

== Bustards ==
Order: Otidiformes Family: Otididae

Bustards are large terrestrial birds mainly associated with dry open country and steppes in the Old World. They are omnivorous and nest on the ground. They walk steadily on strong legs and big toes, pecking for food as they go. They have long broad wings with "fingered" wingtips and striking patterns in flight. Many have interesting mating displays.

- Australian bustard, Ardeotis australis

== Cuckoos ==
Order: Cuculiformes Family: Cuculidae

The family Cuculidae includes cuckoos, roadrunners, and anis. These birds are of variable size with slender bodies, long tails, and strong legs. Many Old World cuckoo species are brood parasites.

- Sumatran ground-cuckoo, Carpococcyx viridis (E)
- Bornean ground-cuckoo, Carpococcyx radiatus
- Biak coucal, Centropus chalybeus (E)
- Greater black coucal, Centropus menbeki
- Short-toed coucal, Centropus rectunguis
- Bay coucal, Centropus celebensis (E)
- Sunda coucal, Centropus nigrorufus (E)
- Greater coucal, Centropus sinensis
- Goliath coucal, Centropus goliath (E)
- Lesser coucal, Centropus bengalensis
- Lesser black coucal, Centropus bernsteini
- Pheasant coucal, Centropus phasianinus
- Raffles's malkoha, Rhinortha chlorophaea
- Red-billed malkoha, Zanclostomus javanicus
- Chestnut-breasted malkoha, Phaenicophaeus curvirostris
- Chestnut-bellied malkoha, Phaenicophaeus sumatranus
- Black-bellied malkoha, Phaenicophaeus diardi
- Green-billed malkoha, Phaenicophaeus tristis
- Yellow-billed malkoha, Rhamphococcyx calyorhynchus (E)
- Chestnut-winged cuckoo, Clamator coromandus
- Dwarf koel, Microdynamis parva
- Asian koel, Eudynamys scolopaceus
- Black-billed koel, Eudynamys melanorhynchus (E)
- Pacific koel, Eudynamys orientalis
- Channel-billed cuckoo, Scythrops novaehollandiae
- Asian emerald cuckoo, Chrysococcyx maculatus
- Violet cuckoo, Chrysococcyx xanthorhynchus
- Long-billed cuckoo, Chrysococcyx megarhynchus
- Horsfield's bronze-cuckoo, Chrysococcyx basalis
- Black-eared cuckoo, Chrysococcyx osculans
- Rufous-throated bronze-cuckoo, Chrysococcyx ruficollis
- Shining bronze-cuckoo, Chrysococcyx lucidus
- White-eared bronze-cuckoo, Chrysococcyx meyerii
- Little bronze-cuckoo, Chrysococcyx minutillus
- Pallid cuckoo, Cacomantis pallidus
- White-crowned koel, Cacomantis leucolophus
- Chestnut-breasted cuckoo, Cacomantis castaneiventris
- Fan-tailed cuckoo, Cacomantis flabelliformis
- Banded bay cuckoo, Cacomantis sonneratii
- Plaintive cuckoo, Cacomantis merulinus
- Moluccan cuckoo, Cacomantis aeruginosus (E)
- Brush cuckoo, Cacomantis variolosus
- Square-tailed drongo-cuckoo, Surniculus lugubris
- Moluccan drongo-cuckoo, Surniculus musschenbroeki
- Moustached hawk-cuckoo, Hierococcyx vagans
- Large hawk-cuckoo, Hierococcyx sparverioides
- Dark hawk-cuckoo, Hierococcyx bocki
- Northern hawk-cuckoo, Hierococcyx hyperythrus
- Hodgson's hawk-cuckoo, Hierococcyx nisicolor
- Malaysian hawk-cuckoo, Hierococcyx fugax
- Sulawesi cuckoo, Cuculus crassirostris (E)
- Indian cuckoo, Cuculus micropterus
- Himalayan cuckoo, Cuculus saturatus
- Sunda cuckoo, Cuculus lepidus
- Common cuckoo, Cuculus canorus
- Oriental cuckoo, Cuculus optatus

== Frogmouths ==
Order: Caprimulgiformes Family: Podargidae

The frogmouths are a group of nocturnal birds related to the nightjars. They are named for their large flattened hooked bill and huge frog-like gape, which they use to take insects.

- Marbled frogmouth, Podargus ocellatus
- Papuan frogmouth, Podargus papuensis
- Large frogmouth, Batrachostomus auritus
- Dulit frogmouth, Batrachostomus harterti
- Gould's frogmouth, Batrachostomus stellatus
- Sumatran frogmouth, Batrachostomus poliolophus (E)
- Bornean frogmouth, Batrachostomus mixtus
- Javan frogmouth, Batrachostomus javensis (E)
- Blyth's frogmouth, Batrachostomus affinis
- Sunda frogmouth, Batrachostomus cornutus

== Nightjars and allies ==
Order: Caprimulgiformes Family: Caprimulgidae

Nightjars are medium-sized nocturnal birds that usually nest on the ground. They have long wings, short legs and very short bills. Most have small feet, of little use for walking, and long pointed wings. Their soft plumage is camouflaged to resemble bark or leaves.

- Spotted nightjar, Eurostopodus argus
- Solomons nightjar, Eurostopodus nigripennis
- White-throated nightjar, Eurostopodus mystacalis
- Diabolical nightjar, Eurostopodus diabolicus (E)
- Papuan nightjar, Eurostopodus papuensis
- Archbold's nightjar, Eurostopodus archboldi
- Malaysian eared-nightjar, Lyncornis temminckii
- Great eared-nightjar, Lyncornis macrotis
- Gray nightjar, Caprimulgus jotaka
- Large-tailed nightjar, Caprimulgus macrurus
- Mees's nightjar, Caprimulgus meesi (E)
- Sulawesi nightjar, Caprimulgus celebensis (E)
- Savanna nightjar, Caprimulgus affinis
- Bonaparte's nightjar, Caprimulgus concretus
- Salvadori's nightjar, Caprimulgus pulchellus (E)

== Owlet-nightjars ==
Order: Caprimulgiformes Family: Aegothelidae

The owlet-nightjars are small nocturnal birds related to the nightjars and frogmouths. They are insectivores which hunt mostly in the air. Their soft plumage is a mixture of browns and paler shades.

- Feline owlet-nightjar, Aegotheles insignis
- Starry owlet-nightjar, Aegotheles tatei (A)
- Wallace's owlet-nightjar, Aegotheles wallacii
- Mountain owlet-nightjar, Aegotheles albertisi
- Moluccan owlet-nightjar, Aegotheles crinifrons (E)
- Australian owlet-nightjar, Aegotheles cristatus
- Vogelkop owlet-nightjar, Aegotheles affinis (E)
- Barred owlet-nightjar, Aegotheles bennettii

== Swifts ==
Order: Caprimulgiformes Family: Apodidae

Swifts are small birds which spend the majority of their lives flying. These birds have very short legs and never settle voluntarily on the ground, perching instead only on vertical surfaces. Many swifts have long swept-back wings which resemble a crescent or boomerang.

- Papuan spinetailed swift, Mearnsia novaeguineae
- Silver-rumped needletail, Rhaphidura leucopygialis
- White-throated needletail, Hirundapus caudacutus
- Silver-backed needletail, Hirundapus cochinchinensis
- Brown-backed needletail, Hirundapus giganteus
- Purple needletail, Hirundapus celebensis
- Waterfall swift, Hydrochous gigas
- Bornean swiftlet, Collocalia dodgei (A)
- Cave swiftlet, Collocalia linchi
- Plume-toed swiftlet, Collocalia affinis
- Tenggara swiftlet, Collocalia sumbawae
- Drab swiftlet, Collocalia neglecta
- Glossy swiftlet, Collocalia esculenta
- Sulawesi swiftlet, Aerodramus sororum (E)
- Halmahera swiftlet, Aerodramus infuscatus (E)
- Seram swiftlet, Aerodramus ceramensis (E)
- Mountain swiftlet, Aerodramus hirundinaceus
- Volcano swiftlet, Aerodramus vulcanorum (E)
- Bare-legged swiftlet, Aerodramus nuditarsus
- Uniform swiftlet, Aerodramus vanikorensis
- Mossy-nest swiftlet, Aerodramus salangana
- Black-nest swiftlet, Aerodramus maximus
- White-nest swiftlet, Aerodramus fuciphagus
- Germain's swiftlet, Aerodramus germani
- Three-toed swiftlet, Aerodramus papuensis
- Pacific swift, Apus pacificus
- House swift, Apus nipalensis
- Asian palm-swift, Cypsiurus balasiensis

== Treeswifts ==
Order: Caprimulgiformes Family: Hemiprocnidae

The treeswifts, also called crested swifts, are closely related to the true swifts. They differ from the other swifts in that they have crests, long forked tails and softer plumage.

- Gray-rumped treeswift, Hemiprocne longipennis
- Whiskered treeswift, Hemiprocne comata
- Moustached treeswift, Hemiprocne mystacea

== Rails, gallinules, and coots ==
Order: Gruiformes Family: Rallidae

Rallidae is a large family of small to medium-sized birds which includes the rails, crakes, coots, and gallinules. Typically they inhabit dense vegetation in damp environments near lakes, swamps, or rivers. In general they are shy and secretive birds, making them difficult to observe. Most species have strong legs and long toes which are well adapted to soft uneven surfaces. They tend to have short, rounded wings and appear to be weak fliers.

- Snoring rail, Aramidopsis plateni (E)
- Slaty-breasted rail, Lewinia striata
- Lewin's rail, Lewinia pectoralis
- Blue-faced rail, Gymnocrex rosenbergii (E)
- Bare-eyed rail, Gymnocrex plumbeiventris
- Talaud rail, Gymnocrex talaudensis (E)
- Invisible rail, Gallirallus wallacii (E)
- Chestnut rail, Gallirallus castaneoventris
- Buff-banded rail, Gallirallus philippensis
- Barred rail, Gallirallus torquatus
- Eurasian moorhen, Gallinula chloropus
- Dusky moorhen, Gallinula tenebrosa
- Eurasian coot, Fulica atra (A)
- Black-backed swamphen, Porphyrio indicus (E)
- Australasian swamphen, Porphyrio melanotus
- Philippine swamphen, Porphyrio pulverulentus (A)
- White-browed crake, Poliolimnas cinereus
- New Guinea flightless rail, Megacrex inepta
- Watercock, Gallicrex cinerea
- Isabelline bush-hen, Amaurornis isabellinus (E)
- White-breasted waterhen, Amaurornis phoenicurus
- Talaud bush-hen, Amaurornis magnirostris (E)
- Pale-vented bush-hen, Amaurornis moluccana
- Chestnut forest-rail, Rallina rubra
- White-striped forest-rail, Rallina leucospila (E)
- Forbes's rail, Rallina forbesi
- Mayr's rail, Rallina mayri
- Red-necked crake, Rallina tricolor
- Red-legged crake, Rallina fasciata
- Slaty-legged crake, Rallina eurizonoides
- Ruddy-breasted crake, Zapornia fusca
- Band-bellied crake, Zapornia paykullii
- Baillon's crake, Zapornia pusilla
- Spotless crake, Zapornia tabuensis

== Finfoots ==
Order: Gruiformes Family: Heliornithidae

Heliornithidae is small family of tropical birds with webbed lobes on their feet similar to those of grebes and coots.

- Masked finfoot, Heliopais personatus (A)

== Cranes ==
Order: Gruiformes Family: Gruidae

Cranes are large, long-legged, and long-necked birds. Unlike the similar-looking but unrelated herons, cranes fly with necks outstretched, not pulled back. Most have elaborate and noisy courting displays or "dances".

- Brolga, Grus rubicunda

== Thick-knees ==
Order: Charadriiformes Family: Burhinidae

The thick-knees are found worldwide within the tropical zone, with some species also breeding in temperate Europe and Australia. They are medium to large waders with strong black or yellow-black bills, large yellow eyes, and cryptic plumage. Despite being classed as waders, most species have a preference for arid or semi-arid habitats.

- Bush thick-knee, Burhinus grallarius (A)
- Beach thick-knee, Esacus magnirostris

== Stilts and avocets ==
Order: Charadriiformes Family: Recurvirostridae

Recurvirostridae is a family of large wading birds which includes the avocets and stilts. The avocets have long legs and long up-curved bills. The stilts have extremely long legs and long, thin, straight bills.

- Black-winged stilt, Himantopus himantopus (A)
- Pied stilt, Himantopus leucocephalus
- Black-necked stilt, Himantopus mexicanus
- Pied avocet, Recurvirostra avosetta (A)
- Red-necked avocet, Recurvirostra novaehollandiae (A)

== Oystercatchers ==
Order: Charadriiformes Family: Haematopodidae

The oystercatchers are large and noisy plover-like birds, with strong bills used for smashing or prising open molluscs.

- Eurasian oystercatcher, Haematopus ostralegus (A)
- Pied oystercatcher, Haematopus longirostris
- Sooty oystercatcher, Haematopus fuliginosus (A)

== Plovers and lapwings ==
Order: Charadriiformes Family: Charadriidae

The family Charadriidae includes the plovers, dotterels, and lapwings. They are small to medium-sized birds with compact bodies, short thick necks, and long, usually pointed, wings. They are found in open country worldwide, mostly in habitats near water.

- Black-bellied plover, Pluvialis squatarola
- Pacific golden-plover, Pluvialis fulva
- Gray-headed lapwing, Vanellus cinereus (A)
- Red-wattled lapwing, Vanellus indicus (A)
- Javan lapwing, Vanellus macropterus (E)
- Masked lapwing, Vanellus miles
- Lesser sand-plover, Charadrius mongolus
- Greater sand-plover, Charadrius leschenaultii
- Red-capped plover, Charadrius ruficapillus
- Malaysian plover, Charadrius peronii
- Kentish plover, Charadrius alexandrinus
- White-faced plover, Charadrius dealbatus
- Javan plover, Charadrius javanicus (E)
- Common ringed plover, Charadrius hiaticula (A)
- Long-billed plover, Charadrius placidus
- Little ringed plover, Charadrius dubius
- Oriental plover, Charadrius veredus
- Red-kneed dotterel, Erythrogonys cinctus
- Black-fronted dotterel, Elseyornis melanops (A)

== Painted-snipes ==
Order: Charadriiformes Family: Rostratulidae

Painted-snipes are short-legged, long-billed birds similar in shape to the true snipes, but more brightly coloured.

- Greater painted-snipe, Rostratula benghalensis

== Jacanas ==
Order: Charadriiformes Family: Jacanidae

The jacanas are a group of waders found throughout the tropics. They are identifiable by their huge feet and claws which enable them to walk on floating vegetation in the shallow lakes that are their preferred habitat.

- Comb-crested jacana, Irediparra gallinacea
- Pheasant-tailed jacana, Hydrophasianus chirurgus
- Bronze-winged jacana, Metopidius indicus

== Sandpipers and allies ==
Order: Charadriiformes Family: Scolopacidae

Scolopacidae is a large diverse family of small to medium-sized shorebirds including the sandpipers, curlews, godwits, shanks, tattlers, woodcocks, snipes, dowitchers, and phalaropes. The majority of these species eat small invertebrates picked out of the mud or soil. Variation in length of legs and bills enables multiple species to feed in the same habitat, particularly on the coast, without direct competition for food.

- Bristle-thighed curlew, Numenius tahitiensis (A)
- Whimbrel, Numenius phaeopus
- Little curlew, Numenius minutus
- Far Eastern curlew, Numenius madagascariensis
- Eurasian curlew, Numenius arquata
- Bar-tailed godwit, Limosa lapponica
- Black-tailed godwit, Limosa limosa
- Ruddy turnstone, Arenaria interpres
- Great knot, Calidris tenuirostris
- Red knot, Calidris canutus
- Ruff, Calidris pugnax
- Broad-billed sandpiper, Calidris falcinellus
- Sharp-tailed sandpiper, Calidris acuminata
- Curlew sandpiper, Calidris ferruginea
- Temminck's stint, Calidris temminckii
- Long-toed stint, Calidris subminuta
- Spoon-billed sandpiper, Calidris pygmaea (A)
- Red-necked stint, Calidris ruficollis
- Sanderling, Calidris alba
- Little stint, Calidris minuta (A)
- Buff-breasted sandpiper, Calidris subruficollis (A)
- Pectoral sandpiper, Calidris melanotos (A)
- Asian dowitcher, Limnodromus semipalmatus
- Long-billed dowitcher, Limnodromus scolopaceus
- Javan woodcock, Scolopax saturata (E)
- New Guinea woodcock, Scolopax rosenbergii
- Sulawesi woodcock, Scolopax celebensis (E)
- Moluccan woodcock, Scolopax rochussenii (E)
- Latham's snipe, Gallinago hardwickii
- Common snipe, Gallinago gallinago
- Pin-tailed snipe, Gallinago stenura
- Swinhoe's snipe, Gallinago megala
- Terek sandpiper, Xenus cinereus
- Red-necked phalarope, Phalaropus lobatus
- Common sandpiper, Actitis hypoleucos
- Green sandpiper, Tringa ochropus
- Gray-tailed tattler, Tringa brevipes
- Wandering tattler, Tringa incana
- Spotted redshank, Tringa erythropus
- Common greenshank, Tringa nebularia
- Nordmann's greenshank, Tringa guttifer
- Lesser yellowlegs, Tringa flavipes (A)
- Marsh sandpiper, Tringa stagnatilis
- Wood sandpiper, Tringa glareola
- Common redshank, Tringa totanus

== Buttonquail ==
Order: Charadriiformes Family: Turnicidae

The buttonquail are small, drab, running birds which resemble the true quails. The female is the brighter of the sexes and initiates courtship. The male incubates the eggs and tends the young.

- Small buttonquail, Turnix sylvaticus
- Red-backed buttonquail, Turnix maculosus
- Barred buttonquail, Turnix suscitator
- Sumba buttonquail, Turnix everetti (E)

== Pratincoles and coursers ==
Order: Charadriiformes Family: Glareolidae

Glareolidae is a family of wading birds comprising the pratincoles, which have short legs, long pointed wings, and long forked tails, and the coursers, which have long legs, short wings, and long, pointed bills which curve downwards.

- Australian pratincole, Stiltia isabella
- Oriental pratincole, Glareola maldivarum

== Skuas and jaegers ==
Order: Charadriiformes Family: Stercorariidae

The family Stercorariidae are, in general, medium to large birds, typically with grey or brown plumage, often with white markings on the wings. They nest on the ground in temperate and arctic regions and are long-distance migrants.

- South polar skua, Stercorarius maccormicki (A)
- Pomarine jaeger, Stercorarius pomarinus
- Parasitic jaeger, Stercorarius parasiticus
- Long-tailed jaeger, Stercorarius longicaudus

== Gulls, terns, and skimmers ==
Order: Charadriiformes Family: Laridae

Laridae is a family of medium to large seabirds, the gulls, terns, and skimmers. They are typically grey or white, often with black markings on the head or wings. They have stout, longish bills and webbed feet. Terns are a group of generally medium to large seabirds typically with grey or white plumage, often with black markings on the head. Most terns hunt fish by diving but some pick insects off the surface of fresh water. Terns are generally long-lived birds, with several species known to live in excess of 30 years. Skimmers are a small family of tropical tern-like birds. They have an elongated lower mandible which they use to feed by flying low over the water surface and skimming the water for small fish.

- Sabine's gull, Xema sabini (A)
- Silver gull, Chroicocephalus novaehollandiae
- Black-headed gull, Chroicocephalus ridibundus
- Brown-headed gull, Chroicocephalus brunnicephalus (A)
- Lesser black-backed gull, Larus fuscus (A)
- Slaty-backed gull, Larus schistisagus (A)
- Brown noddy, Anous stolidus
- Black noddy, Anous minutus
- Blue-billed white tern, Gygis candida
- Sooty tern, Onychoprion fuscatus
- Gray-backed tern, Onychoprion lunatus (A)
- Bridled tern, Onychoprion anaethetus
- Aleutian tern, Onychoprion aleuticus
- Little tern, Sternula albifrons
- Gull-billed tern, Gelochelidon nilotica
- Caspian tern, Hydroprogne caspia
- White-winged tern, Chlidonias leucopterus
- Whiskered tern, Chlidonias hybrida
- Roseate tern, Sterna dougallii
- Black-naped tern, Sterna sumatrana
- Common tern, Sterna hirundo
- Great crested tern, Thalasseus bergii
- Lesser crested tern, Thalasseus bengalensis
- Chinese crested tern, Thalasseus bernsteini

== Tropicbirds ==
Order: Phaethontiformes Family: Phaethontidae

Tropicbirds are slender white birds of tropical oceans with exceptionally long central tail feathers. Their heads and long wings have black markings.

- White-tailed tropicbird, Phaethon lepturus
- Red-billed tropicbird, Phaethon aethereus (A)
- Red-tailed tropicbird, Phaethon rubricauda

== Southern storm-petrels ==
Order: Procellariiformes Family: Oceanitidae

The southern storm-petrels are relatives of the petrels and are the smallest seabirds. They feed on planktonic crustaceans and small fish picked from the surface, typically while hovering. The flight is fluttering and sometimes bat-like.

- Wilson's storm-petrel, Oceanites oceanicus
- White-faced storm-petrel, Pelagodroma marina (A)
- Black-bellied storm-petrel, Fregetta tropica (A)

== Northern storm-petrels ==
Order: Procellariiformes Family: Hydrobatidae

Though the members of this family are similar in many respects to the southern storm-petrels, including their general appearance and habits, there are enough genetic differences to warrant their placement in a separate family.

- Swinhoe's storm-petrel, Hydrobates monorhis
- Matsudaira's storm-petrel, Hydrobates matsudairae

== Shearwaters and petrels ==
Order: Procellariiformes Family: Procellariidae

The procellariids are the main group of medium-sized "true petrels", characterised by united nostrils with medium septum and a long outer functional primary.

- Cape petrel, Daption capense (A)
- Kermadec petrel, Pterodroma neglecta (A)
- Barau's petrel, Pterodroma baraui
- Galapagos petrel, Pterodroma phaeopygia (A)
- Gould's petrel, Pterodroma leucoptera (A)
- Antarctic prion, Pachyptila desolata (A)
- Slender-billed prion, Pachyptila belcheri (A)
- Bulwer's petrel, Bulweria bulwerii
- Jouanin's petrel, Bulweria fallax
- Tahiti petrel, Pseudobulweria rostrata
- Beck's petrel, Pseudobulweria becki (A)
- Streaked shearwater, Calonectris leucomelas
- Flesh-footed shearwater, Ardenna carneipes
- Wedge-tailed shearwater, Ardenna pacificus
- Sooty shearwater, Ardenna grisea
- Short-tailed shearwater, Ardenna tenuirostris (A)
- Tropical shearwater, Puffinus bailloni
- Heinroth's shearwater, Puffinus heinrothi (A)

== Storks ==
Order: Ciconiiformes Family: Ciconiidae

Storks are large, long-legged, long-necked, wading birds with long, stout bills. Storks are virtually mute, but bill-clattering is an important mode of communication at the nest. Their nests can be large and may be reused for many years. Many species are migratory.

- Asian openbill, Anastomus oscitans (A)
- Asian woolly-necked stork, Ciconia episcopus
- Storm's stork, Ciconia stormi
- Black-necked stork, Ephippiorhynchus asiaticus
- Lesser adjutant, Leptoptilos javanicus
- Greater adjutant, Leptoptilos dubius (Ex)
- Milky stork, Mycteria cinerea

== Frigatebirds ==
Order: Suliformes Family: Fregatidae

Frigatebirds are large seabirds usually found over tropical oceans. They are large, black-and-white, or completely black, with long wings and deeply forked tails. The males have coloured inflatable throat pouches. They do not swim or walk and cannot take off from a flat surface. Having the largest wingspan-to-body-weight ratio of any bird, they are essentially aerial, able to stay aloft for more than a week.

- Lesser frigatebird, Fregata ariel
- Christmas Island frigatebird, Fregata andrewsi
- Great frigatebird, Fregata minor

== Boobies and gannets ==
Order: Suliformes Family: Sulidae

The gannets and boobies are medium to large coastal seabirds that plunge-dive for fish.

- Masked booby, Sula dactylatra
- Brown booby, Sula leucogaster
- Red-footed booby, Sula sula
- Abbott's booby, Papasula abbotti

== Anhingas ==
Order: Suliformes Family: Anhingidae

Anhingas or darters are often called "snake-birds" because they have long thin necks, which gives a snake-like appearance when they swim with their bodies submerged. The males have black and dark-brown plumage, an erectile crest on the nape and a larger bill than the female. The females have much paler plumage, especially, on the neck and underparts. The darters have completely webbed feet and their legs are short and set far back on the body. Their plumage is somewhat permeable, like that of cormorants, and they spread their wings to dry after diving.

- Oriental darter, Anhinga melanogaster
- Australasian darter, Anhinga novaehollandiae

== Cormorants and shags ==
Order: Suliformes Family: Phalacrocoracidae

The Phalacrocoracidae are a family of medium to large fish-eating birds that includes cormorants and shags. Plumage colouration varies; the majority of species have mainly dark plumage, but some are pied black and white, and a few are more colourful.

- Little pied cormorant, Microcarbo melanoleucos
- Little cormorant, Microcarbo niger
- Great cormorant, Phalacrocorax carbo
- Little black cormorant, Phalacrocorax sulcirostris

== Pelicans ==
Order: Pelecaniformes Family: Pelecanidae

Pelicans are large water birds with a distinctive pouch under their beak. They have webbed feet with four toes.

- Great white pelican, Pelecanus onocrotalus
- Australian pelican, Pelecanus conspicillatus
- Spot-billed pelican, Pelecanus philippensis (A)

== Herons, egrets, and bitterns ==
Order: Pelecaniformes Family: Ardeidae

The family Ardeidae contains the bitterns, herons, and egrets. Herons and egrets are medium to large wading birds with long necks and legs. Bitterns tend to be shorter necked and more wary. Unlike other long-necked birds such as storks, ibises, and spoonbills, members of this family fly with their necks retracted.

- Yellow bittern, Ixobrychus sinensis
- Black-backed bittern, Ixobrychus dubius
- Schrenck's bittern, Ixobrychus eurhythmus
- Cinnamon bittern, Ixobrychus cinnamomeus
- Black bittern, Ixobrychus flavicollis
- Forest bittern, Zonerodius heliosylus
- Gray heron, Ardea cinerea
- Pacific heron, Ardea pacifica
- Great-billed heron, Ardea sumatrana
- Purple heron, Ardea purpurea
- Great egret, Ardea alba
- Intermediate egret, Ardea intermedia
- White-faced heron, Egretta novaehollandiae
- Chinese egret, Egretta eulophotes
- Little egret, Egretta garzetta
- Pacific reef-heron, Egretta sacra
- Pied heron, Egretta picata
- Eastern cattle egret, Ardea coromanda
- Chinese pond-heron, Ardeola bacchus
- Javan pond-heron, Ardeola speciosa
- Striated heron, Butorides striata
- Black-crowned night-heron, Nycticorax nycticorax
- Nankeen night-heron, Nycticorax caledonicus
- Japanese night-heron, Gorsachius goisagi
- Malayan night-heron, Gorsachius melanolophus

== Ibises and spoonbills ==
Order: Pelecaniformes Family: Threskiornithidae

Threskiornithidae is a family of large terrestrial and wading birds which comprises the ibises and spoonbills. Its members have long, broad wings with 11 primary and about 20 secondary flight feathers. They are strong fliers and, despite their size and weight, very capable soarers.

- Glossy ibis, Plegadis falcinellus
- Black-headed ibis, Threskiornis melanocephalus
- Australian ibis, Threskiornis molucca
- Straw-necked ibis, Threskiornis spinicollis
- White-shouldered ibis, Pseudibis davisoni
- Royal spoonbill, Platalea regia
- Yellow-billed spoonbill, Platalea flavipes (A)

== Osprey ==
Order: Accipitriformes Family: Pandionidae

The family Pandionidae contains only one species, the osprey. The osprey is a medium-large raptor which is a specialist fish-eater with a worldwide distribution.

- Osprey, Pandion haliaetus

== Hawks, eagles, and kites ==
Order: Accipitriformes Family: Accipitridae

Accipitridae is a family of birds of prey which includes hawks, eagles, kites, harriers, and Old World vultures. These birds mostly have powerful hooked beaks for tearing flesh from their prey, strong legs, powerful talons, and keen eyesight.

- Black-winged kite, Elanus caeruleus
- Sulawesi honey-buzzard, Pernis celebensis
- Philippine honey-buzzard, Pernis steerei
- Oriental honey-buzzard, Pernis ptilorhyncus
- Long-tailed honey-buzzard, Henicopernis longicauda
- Jerdon's baza, Aviceda jerdoni
- Pacific baza, Aviceda subcristata
- Black baza, Aviceda leuphotes
- Sulawesi serpent-eagle, Spilornis rufipectus (E)
- Mountain serpent-eagle, Spilornis kinabaluensis
- Crested serpent eagle, Spilornis cheela
- Short-toed snake eagle, Circaetus gallicus
- Bat hawk, Macheiramphus alcinus
- New Guinea eagle, Harpyopsis novaeguineae
- Changeable hawk-eagle, Nisaetus cirrhatus
- Flores hawk-eagle, Nisaetus floris (E)
- Blyth's hawk-eagle, Nisaetus alboniger
- Javan hawk-eagle, Nisaetus bartelsi (E)
- Sulawesi hawk-eagle, Nisaetus lanceolatus (E)
- Wallace's hawk-eagle, Nisaetus nanus
- Rufous-bellied eagle, Lophotriorchis kienerii
- Black eagle, Ictinaetus malaiensis
- Greater spotted eagle, Clanga clanga (A)
- Booted eagle, Hieraaetus pennatus
- Pygmy eagle, Hieraaetus weiskei
- Gurney's eagle, Aquila gurneyi
- Wedge-tailed eagle, Aquila audax (A)
- Bonelli's eagle, Aquila fasciata
- White-eyed buzzard, Butastur teesa (A)
- Rufous-winged buzzard, Butastur liventer
- Gray-faced buzzard, Butastur indicus
- Eurasian marsh-harrier, Circus aeruginosus (A)
- Eastern marsh-harrier, Circus spilonotus
- Papuan marsh-harrier, Circus spilothorax
- Swamp harrier, Circus approximans
- Spotted harrier, Circus assimilis
- Pied harrier, Circus melanoleucos
- Crested goshawk, Accipiter trivirgatus
- Sulawesi goshawk, Accipiter griseiceps (E)
- Shikra, Accipiter badius
- Chinese sparrowhawk, Accipiter soloensis
- Spot-tailed sparrowhawk, Accipiter trinotatus (E)
- Variable goshawk, Accipiter hiogaster
- Brown goshawk, Accipiter fasciatus
- Black-mantled goshawk, Accipiter melanochlamys
- Moluccan goshawk, Accipiter henicogrammus (E)
- Gray-headed goshawk, Accipiter poliocephalus
- Japanese sparrowhawk, Accipiter gularis
- Small sparrowhawk, Accipiter nanus (E)
- Besra, Accipiter virgatus
- Rufous-necked sparrowhawk, Accipiter erythrauchen (E)
- Collared sparrowhawk, Accipiter cirrocephalus
- Vinous-breasted sparrowhawk, Accipiter rhodogaster (E)
- Eurasian sparrowhawk, Accipiter nisus (A)
- Meyer's goshawk, Accipiter meyerianus
- Chestnut-shouldered goshawk, Erythrotriorchis buergersi
- Doria's goshawk, Megatriorchis doriae
- Black kite, Milvus migrans
- Whistling kite, Haliastur sphenurus
- Brahminy kite, Haliastur indus
- White-bellied sea-eagle, Haliaeetus leucogaster
- Lesser fish-eagle, Ichthyophaga humilis
- Gray-headed fish-eagle, Ichthyophaga ichthyaetus
- Eastern buzzard, Buteo japonicus

== Barn-owls ==
Order: Strigiformes Family: Tytonidae

Barn-owls are medium to large owls with large heads and characteristic heart-shaped faces. They have long strong legs with powerful talons.

- Sooty owl, Tyto tenebricosa
- Australian masked-owl, Tyto novaehollandiae
- Seram masked-owl, Tyto almae (E)
- Lesser masked-owl, Tyto sororcula (E)
- Taliabu masked-owl, Tyto nigrobrunnea (E)
- Minahassa masked-owl, Tyto inexspectata (E)
- Sulawesi masked-owl, Tyto rosenbergii (E)
- Australasian grass-owl, Tyto longimembris
- Barn owl, Tyto alba
- Oriental bay-owl, Phodilus badius

== Owls ==
Order: Strigiformes Family: Strigidae

The typical owls are small to large solitary nocturnal birds of prey. They have large forward-facing eyes and ears, a hawk-like beak, and a conspicuous circle of feathers around each eye called a facial disk.

- White-fronted scops-owl, Otus sagittatus (A)
- Reddish scops-owl, Otus rufescens
- Flores scops-owl, Otus alfredi (E)
- Mountain scops-owl, Otus spilocephalus
- Rajah scops-owl, Otus brookii
- Javan scops-owl, Otus angelinae (E)
- Mentawai scops-owl, Otus mentawi (E)
- Sunda scops-owl, Otus lempiji
- Wallace's scops-owl, Otus silvicola (E)
- Moluccan scops-owl, Otus magicus
- Rinjani scops-owl, Otus jolandae (E)
- Sulawesi scops-owl, Otus manadensis (E)
- Banggai scops-owl, Otus mendeni (E)
- Wetar scops-owl, Otus tempestatis (E)
- Sangihe scops-owl, Otus collari (E)
- Siau scops-owl, Otus siaoensis (E)
- Sula scops-owl, Otus sulaensis (E)
- Biak scops-owl, Otus beccarii (E)
- Simeulue scops-owl, Otus umbra (E)
- Enggano scops-owl, Otus enganensis (E)
- Oriental scops-owl, Otus sunia
- Barred eagle-owl, Bubo sumatranus
- Buffy fish-owl, Ketupa ketupu
- Javan owlet, Glaucidium castanopterum (E)
- Sunda owlet, Taenioptynx sylvaticus (E)
- Spotted wood-owl, Strix seloputo
- Brown wood-owl, Strix leptogrammica
- Rufous owl, Ninox rufa
- Barking owl, Ninox connivens
- Sumba boobook, Ninox rudolfi (E)
- Southern boobook, Ninox boobook
- Rote boobook, Ninox rotiensis (E)
- Timor boobook, Ninox fusca (E)
- Alor boobook, Ninox plesseni (E)
- Least boobook, Ninox sumbaensis (E)
- Brown boobook, Ninox scutulata
- Northern boobook, Ninox japonica
- Chocolate boobook, Ninox randi
- Ochre-bellied boobook, Ninox ochracea (E)
- Togian boobook, Ninox burhani (E)
- Cinnabar boobook, Ninox ios (E)
- Halmahera boobook, Ninox hypogramma (E)
- Tanimbar boobook, Ninox forbesi (E)
- Seram boobook, Ninox squamipila (E)
- Buru boobook, Ninox hantu (E)
- Papuan boobook, Ninox theomacha
- Speckled boobook, Ninox punctulata (E)
- Papuan owl, Uroglaux dimorpha

== Trogons ==
Order: Trogoniformes Family: Trogonidae

The family Trogonidae includes the trogons and quetzals. Found in tropical woodlands worldwide, they feed on insects and fruit, and their broad bills and weak legs reflect their diet and arboreal habits. Although their flight is fast, they are reluctant to fly any distance. Trogons have soft, often colourful, feathers with distinctive male and female plumage.

- Javan trogon, Harpactes reinwardtii (E)
- Sumatran trogon, Harpactes mackloti (E)
- Red-naped trogon, Harpactes kasumba
- Diard's trogon, Harpactes diardii
- Whitehead's trogon, Harpactes whiteheadi
- Cinnamon-rumped trogon, Harpactes orrhophaeus
- Scarlet-rumped trogon, Harpactes duvaucelii
- Red-headed trogon, Harpactes erythrocephalus
- Orange-breasted trogon, Harpactes oreskios

== Hoopoes ==
Order: Bucerotiformes Family: Upupidae

Hoopoes have black, white, and pink plumage and a large erectile crest on the head.

- Eurasian hoopoe, Upupa epops

== Hornbills ==
Order: Bucerotiformes Family: Bucerotidae

Hornbills are a group of birds whose bill is shaped like a cow's horn, but without a twist, sometimes with a casque on the upper mandible. Frequently, the bill is brightly coloured.

- White-crowned hornbill, Berenicornis comatus
- Helmeted hornbill, Buceros vigil
- Rhinoceros hornbill, Buceros rhinoceros
- Great hornbill, Buceros bicornis
- Bushy-crested hornbill, Anorrhinus galeritus
- Black hornbill, Anthracoceros malayanus
- Oriental pied-hornbill, Anthracoceros albirostris
- Knobbed hornbill, Rhyticeros cassidix (E)
- Sumba hornbill, Rhyticeros everetti (E)
- Wreathed hornbill, Rhyticeros undulatus
- Blyth's hornbill, Rhyticeros plicatus
- Sulawesi hornbill, Rhabdotorrhinus exarhatus (E)
- Wrinkled hornbill, Rhabdotorrhinus corrugatus

== Kingfishers ==
Order: Coraciiformes Family: Alcedinidae

Kingfishers are medium-sized birds with large heads, long, pointed bills, short legs, and stubby tails.

- Common kingfisher, Alcedo atthis
- Blue-eared kingfisher, Alcedo meninting
- Javan blue-banded kingfisher, Alcedo euryzona (E)
- Malaysian blue-banded kingfisher, Alcedo peninsulae
- Small blue kingfisher, Alcedo coerulescens (E)
- Azure kingfisher, Ceyx azureus
- Little kingfisher, Ceyx pusillus
- Black-backed dwarf-kingfisher, Ceyx erithaca
- Rufous-backed dwarf-kingfisher, Ceyx rufidorsa
- Sulawesi dwarf-kingfisher, Ceyx fallax (E)
- Sangihe dwarf-kingfisher, Ceyx sangirensis (E)
- Sula dwarf-kingfisher, Ceyx wallacii (E)
- Moluccan dwarf-kingfisher, Ceyx lepidus (E)
- Buru dwarf-kingfisher, Ceyx cajeli (E)
- Papuan dwarf-kingfisher, Ceyx solitarius
- Banded kingfisher, Lacedo pulchella
- Blue-winged kookaburra, Dacelo leachii
- Spangled kookaburra, Dacelo tyro
- Rufous-bellied kookaburra, Dacelo gaudichaud
- Shovel-billed kookaburra, Clytoceyx rex
- Sulawesi lilac kingfisher, Cittura cyanotis (E)
- Sangihe lilac kingfisher, Cittura sanghirensis (E)
- Stork-billed kingfisher, Pelargopsis capensis
- Great-billed kingfisher, Pelargopsis melanorhyncha (E)
- Ruddy kingfisher, Halcyon coromanda
- White-throated kingfisher, Halcyon smyrnensis
- Black-capped kingfisher, Halcyon pileata
- Javan kingfisher, Halcyon cyanoventris (E)
- Blue-black kingfisher, Todirhamphus nigrocyaneus
- Blue-and-white kingfisher, Todirhamphus diops (E)
- Lazuli kingfisher, Todirhamphus lazuli (E)
- Forest kingfisher, Todirhamphus macleayii
- Torresian kingfisher, Todirhamphus sordidus
- Sacred kingfisher, Todirhamphus sanctus
- Collared kingfisher, Todirhamphus chloris
- Beach kingfisher, Todirhamphus saurophagus
- Sombre kingfisher, Todirhamphus funebris (E)
- Talaud kingfisher, Todirhamphus enigma (E)
- Cinnamon-banded kingfisher, Todirhamphus australasia (E)
- White-rumped kingfisher, Caridonax fulgidus (E)
- Hook-billed kingfisher, Melidora macrorrhina
- Rufous-collared kingfisher, Actenoides concretus
- Green-backed kingfisher, Actenoides monachus (E)
- Scaly-breasted kingfisher, Actenoides princeps (E)
- Yellow-billed kingfisher, Syma torotoro
- Mountain kingfisher, Syma megarhyncha
- Little paradise-kingfisher, Tanysiptera hydrocharis
- Common paradise-kingfisher, Tanysiptera galatea
- Kofiau paradise-kingfisher, Tanysiptera ellioti (E)
- Biak paradise-kingfisher, Tanysiptera riedelii (E)
- Numfor paradise-kingfisher, Tanysiptera carolinae (E)
- Red-breasted paradise-kingfisher, Tanysiptera nympha
- Buff-breasted paradise-kingfisher, Tanysiptera sylvia

== Bee-eaters ==
Order: Coraciiformes Family: Meropidae

The bee-eaters are a group of coraciiform birds. Most species are found in Africa but others occur in southern Europe, southern Asia, Australia and New Guinea. They are characterised by richly coloured plumage, slender bodies, and usually elongated central tail feathers. All are colourful and have long down-turned bills and pointed wings, which give them a swallow-like appearance when seen from afar.

- Red-bearded bee-eater, Nyctyornis amictus
- Purple-bearded bee-eater, Meropogon forsteni (E)
- Blue-throated bee-eater, Merops viridis
- Blue-tailed bee-eater, Merops philippinus
- Rainbow bee-eater, Merops ornatus
- Chestnut-headed bee-eater, Merops leschenaulti

== Rollers ==
Order: Coraciiformes Family: Coraciidae

Rollers resemble crows in size and build, but are more closely related to the kingfishers and bee-eaters. They share the colourful appearance of those groups with blues and browns predominating. The two inner front toes are connected, but the outer toe is not.

- Purple-winged roller, Coracias temminckii (E)
- Dollarbird, Eurystomus orientalis
- Azure roller, Eurystomus azureus (E)

== Asian barbets ==
Order: Piciformes Family: Megalaimidae

The Asian barbets are plump birds, with short necks and large heads. They get their name from the bristles which fringe their heavy bills. Most species are brightly coloured.

- Sooty barbet, Caloramphus hayii
- Brown barbet, Caloramphus fuliginosus
- Coppersmith barbet, Psilopogon haemacephalus
- Blue-eared barbet, Psilopogon duvaucelii
- Little barbet, Psilopogon australis
- Bornean barbet, Psilopogon eximius
- Fire-tufted barbet, Psilopogon pyrolophus
- Red-crowned barbet, Psilopogon rafflesii
- Red-throated barbet, Psilopogon mystacophanos
- Black-banded barbet, Psilopogon javensis (E)
- Golden-naped barbet, Psilopogon pulcherrimus
- Yellow-crowned barbet, Psilopogon henricii
- Flame-fronted barbet, Psilopogon armillaris (E)
- Lineated barbet, Psilopogon lineatus
- Mountain barbet, Psilopogon monticola
- Brown-throated barbet, Psilopogon corvinus (E)
- Gold-whiskered barbet, Psilopogon chrysopogon
- Black-browed barbet, Psilopogon oorti

== Honeyguides ==
Order: Piciformes Family: Indicatoridae

Honeyguides are among the few birds that feed on wax. They are named for the greater honeyguide which leads traditional honey-hunters to bees' nests and, after the hunters have harvested the honey, feeds on the remaining contents of the hive.

- Malaysian honeyguide, Indicator archipelagicus

== Woodpeckers ==
Order: Piciformes Family: Picidae

Woodpeckers are small to medium-sized birds with chisel-like beaks, short legs, stiff tails, and long tongues used for capturing insects. Some species have feet with two toes pointing forward and two backward, while several species have only three toes. Many woodpeckers have the habit of tapping noisily on tree trunks with their beaks.

- Speckled piculet, Picumnus innominatus
- Rufous piculet, Sasia abnormis
- Gray-and-buff woodpecker, Hemicircus concretus
- Sulawesi pygmy woodpecker, Yungipicus temminckii (E)
- Sunda pygmy woodpecker, Yungipicus moluccensis
- Gray-capped pygmy woodpecker, Yungipicus canicapillus
- Freckle-breasted woodpecker, Dendrocopos analis
- Maroon woodpecker, Blythipicus rubiginosus
- Orange-backed woodpecker, Reinwardtipicus validus
- Greater flameback, Chrysocolaptes guttacristatus
- Javan flameback, Chrysocolaptes strictus
- Rufous woodpecker, Micropternus brachyurus
- Buff-necked woodpecker, Meiglyptes tukki
- Buff-rumped woodpecker, Meiglyptes tristis
- Olive-backed woodpecker, Dinopium rafflesii
- Common flameback, Dinopium javanense
- Lesser yellownape, Picus chlorolophus
- Crimson-winged woodpecker, Picus puniceus
- Laced woodpecker, Picus vittatus
- Gray-headed woodpecker, Picus canus
- Banded woodpecker, Chrysophlegma miniaceum
- Greater yellownape, Chrysophlegma flavinucha
- Checker-throated woodpecker, Chrysophlegma mentale
- Ashy woodpecker, Mulleripicus fulvus (E)
- Great slaty woodpecker, Mulleripicus pulverulentus
- White-bellied woodpecker, Dryocopus javensis

== Falcons and caracaras ==
Order: Falconiformes Family: Falconidae

Falconidae is a family of diurnal birds of prey. They differ from hawks, eagles, and kites in that they kill with their beaks instead of their talons.

- Black-thighed falconet, Microhierax fringillarius
- White-fronted falconet, Microhierax latifrons
- Eurasian kestrel, Falco tinnunculus (A)
- Spotted kestrel, Falco moluccensis (E)
- Nankeen kestrel, Falco cenchroides
- Eurasian hobby, Falco subbuteo (A)
- Oriental hobby, Falco severus
- Australian hobby, Falco longipennis
- Brown falcon, Falco berigora
- Peregrine falcon, Falco peregrinus

== Cockatoos ==
Order: Psittaciformes Family: Cacatuidae

The cockatoos share many features with other parrots including the characteristic curved beak shape and a zygodactyl foot, with two forward toes and two backwards toes. They differ, however in a number of characteristics, including the often spectacular movable headcrest.

- Palm cockatoo, Probosciger aterrimus
- Little corella, Cacatua sanguinea
- Tanimbar cockatoo, Cacatua goffiniana (E)
- Yellow-crested cockatoo, Cacatua sulphurea
- Sulphur-crested cockatoo, Cacatua galerita
- Salmon-crested cockatoo, Cacatua moluccensis (E)
- White cockatoo, Cacatua alba (E)

== Old World parrots ==
Order: Psittaciformes Family: Psittaculidae

Characteristic features of parrots include a strong curved bill, an upright stance, strong legs, and clawed zygodactyl feet. Many parrots are vividly coloured, and some are multi-coloured. In size they range from 8 cm (3.1 in) to 1 m (3.3 ft) in length. Old World parrots are found from Africa east across south and southeast Asia and Oceania to Australia and New Zealand.

- Pesquet's parrot, Psittrichas fulgidus
- Yellow-capped pygmy-parrot, Micropsitta keiensis
- Geelvink pygmy-parrot, Micropsitta geelvinkiana (E)
- Buff-faced pygmy-parrot, Micropsitta pusio
- Red-breasted pygmy-parrot, Micropsitta bruijnii
- Moluccan king-parrot, Alisterus amboinensis (E)
- Papuan king-parrot, Alisterus chloropterus
- Olive-shouldered parrot, Aprosmictus jonquillaceus (E)
- Red-winged parrot, Aprosmictus erythropterus
- Buru racquet-tail, Prioniturus mada (E)
- Golden-mantled racquet-tail, Prioniturus platurus (E)
- Yellow-breasted racquet-tail, Prioniturus flavicans (E)
- Eclectus parrot, Eclectus roratus
- Red-cheeked parrot, Geoffroyus geoffroyi
- Blue-collared parrot, Geoffroyus simplex
- Blue-rumped parrot, Psittinus cyanurus
- Rose-ringed parakeet, Psittacula krameri (A)
- Red-breasted parakeet, Psittacula alexandri
- Long-tailed parakeet, Psittacula longicauda
- Painted tiger-parrot, Psittacella picta
- Brehm's tiger-parrot, Psittacella brehmii
- Modest tiger-parrot, Psittacella modesta
- Madarasz's tiger-parrot, Psittacella madaraszi
- Black-lored parrot, Tanygnathus gramineus (E)
- Great-billed parrot, Tanygnathus megalorynchos
- Blue-naped parrot, Tanygnathus lucionensis
- Azure-rumped parrot, Tanygnathus sumatranus
- Blue-fronted fig parrot, Nannopsittacus gulielmitertii
- Double-eyed fig-parrot, Cyclopsitta diophthalma
- Large fig-parrot, Psittaculirostris desmarestii
- Edwards's fig-parrot, Psittaculirostris edwardsii
- Salvadori's fig-parrot, Psittaculirostris salvadorii (E)
- Plum-faced lorikeet, Oreopsittacus arfaki
- Pygmy lorikeet, Charminetta wilhelminae
- Red-fronted lorikeet, Hypocharmosyna rubronotata
- Red-flanked lorikeet, Hypocharmosyna placentis
- Blue-fronted lorikeet, Charmosynopsis toxopei (E)
- Fairy lorikeet, Charmosynopsis pulchella
- Striated lorikeet, Synorhacma multistriata
- Josephine's lorikeet, Charmosyna josefinae
- Papuan lorikeet, Charmosyna papou
- Yellow-billed lorikeet, Neopsittacus musschenbroekii
- Orange-billed lorikeet, Neopsittacus pullicauda
- Chattering lory, Lorius garrulus (E)
- Purple-naped lory, Lorius domicella (E)
- Black-capped lory, Lorius lory
- Dusky lory, Pseudeos fuscata
- Brown lory, Chalcopsitta duivenbodei
- Black lory, Chalcopsitta atra
- Yellow-streaked lory, Chalcopsitta scintillata
- Goldie's lorikeet, Glossoptila goldiei
- Iris lorikeet, Saudareos iris (E)
- Ornate lorikeet, Saudareos ornatus (E)
- Yellow-cheeked lorikeet, Saudareos meyeri (E)
- Sula lorikeet, Saudareos flavoviridis (E)
- Blue-streaked lory, Eos reticulata (E)
- Blue-eared lory, Eos semilarvata (E)
- Red lory, Eos bornea (E)
- Black-winged lory, Eos cyanogenia (E)
- Red-and-blue lory, Eos histrio (E)
- Violet-necked lory, Eos squamata (E)
- Coconut lorikeet, Trichoglossus haematodus
- Red-collared lorikeet, Trichoglossus rubritorquis
- Olive-headed lorikeet, Trichoglossus euteles (E)
- Marigold lorikeet, Trichoglossus capistratus (E)
- Leaf lorikeet, Trichoglossus weberi (E)
- Sunset lorikeet, Trichoglossus forsteni
- Blue-crowned hanging-parrot, Loriculus galgulus
- Sulawesi hanging-parrot, Loriculus stigmatus (E)
- Sula hanging-parrot, Loriculus sclateri (E)
- Moluccan hanging-parrot, Loriculus amabilis
- Sangihe hanging-parrot, Loriculus catamene (E)
- Papuan hanging-parrot, Loriculus aurantiifrons
- Pygmy hanging-parrot, Loriculus exilis (E)
- Yellow-throated hanging-parrot, Loriculus pusillus (E)
- Wallace's hanging-parrot, Loriculus flosculus (E)

== African and green broadbills ==
Order: Passeriformes Family: Calyptomenidae

The broadbills are small, brightly coloured birds which feed on fruit and also take insects in flycatcher fashion, snapping their broad bills. Their habitat is canopies of wet forests.

- Green broadbill, Calyptomena viridis
- Hose's broadbill, Calyptomena hosii
- Whitehead's broadbill, Calyptomena whiteheadi

== Asian and Grauer's broadbills ==
Order: Passeriformes Family: Eurylaimidae

The broadbills are small, brightly coloured birds, which feed on fruit and also take insects in flycatcher fashion, snapping their broad bills. Their habitat is canopies of wet fore

- Long-tailed broadbill, Psarisomus dalhousiae
- Dusky broadbill, Corydon sumatranus
- Silver-breasted broadbill, Serilophus lunatus
- Black-and-red broadbill, Cymbirhynchus macrorhynchos
- Banded broadbill, Eurylaimus javanicus
- Black-and-yellow broadbill, Eurylaimus ochromalus

== Pittas ==
Order: Passeriformes Family: Pittidae

Pittas are medium-sized stocky passerines with fairly long, strong legs, short tails, and stout bills. Many are brightly coloured. They spend the majority of their time on wet forest floors, eating snails, insects, and similar invertebrate prey.

- Blue-breasted pitta, Erythropitta erythrogaster
- Sangihe pitta, Erythropitta caeruleitorques (E)
- Siau pitta, Erythropitta palliceps
- Sulawesi pitta, Erythropitta celebensis (E)
- Sula pitta, Erythropitta dohertyi (E)
- North Moluccan pitta, Erythropitta rufiventris (E)
- South Moluccan pitta, Erythropitta rubrinucha (E)
- Papuan pitta, Erythropitta macklotii
- Graceful pitta, Erythropitta venusta
- Blue-banded pitta, Erythropitta arquata
- Garnet pitta, Erythropitta granatina
- Giant pitta, Hydrornis caeruleus
- Schneider's pitta, Hydrornis schneideri (E)
- Malayan banded-pitta, Hydrornis irena
- Javan banded-pitta, Hydrornis guajanus
- Bornean banded-pitta, Hydrornis schwaneri
- Blue-headed pitta, Hydrornis baudii
- Blue-winged pitta, Pitta moluccensis
- Fairy pitta, Pitta nympha
- Hooded pitta, Pitta sordida
- Noisy pitta, Pitta versicolor
- Ivory-breasted pitta, Pitta maxima (E)
- Ornate pitta, Pitta concinna
- Elegant pitta, Pitta elegans
- Banda Sea pitta, Pitta vigorsii
- Mangrove pitta, Pitta megarhyncha

== Bowerbirds ==
Order: Passeriformes Family: Ptilonorhynchidae

The bowerbirds are small to medium-sized passerine birds. The males notably build a bower to attract a mate. Depending on the species, the bower ranges from a circle of cleared earth with a small pile of twigs in the center to a complex and highly decorated structure of sticks and leaves.

- White-eared catbird, Ailuroedus buccoides
- Ochre-breasted catbird, Ailuroedus stonii
- Tan-capped catbird, Ailuroedus geislerorum
- Northern catbird, Ailuroedus jobiensis
- Arfak catbird, Ailuroedus arfakianus
- Black-eared catbird, Ailuroedus melanotis
- Archbold's bowerbird, Archboldia papuensis
- Vogelkop bowerbird, Amblyornis inornata (E)
- MacGregor's bowerbird, Amblyornis macgregoriae
- Golden-fronted bowerbird, Amblyornis flavifrons (E)
- Masked bowerbird, Sericulus aureus
- Flame bowerbird, Sericulus ardens
- Yellow-breasted bowerbird, Chlamydera lauterbachi
- Fawn-breasted bowerbird, Chlamydera cerviniventris

== Australasian treecreepers ==
Order: Passeriformes Family: Climacteridae

The Climacteridae are medium-small, mostly brown-coloured birds with patterning on their underparts. They are endemic to Australia and New Guinea.

- Papuan treecreeper, Cormobates placens

== Fairywrens ==
Order: Passeriformes Family: Maluridae

Maluridae is a family of small, insectivorous passerine birds endemic to Australia and New Guinea. They are socially monogamous and sexually promiscuous, meaning that although they form pairs between one male and one female, each partner will mate with other individuals and even assist in raising the young from such pairings.

- Wallace's fairywren, Sipodotus wallacii
- Orange-crowned fairywren, Clytomyias insignis
- Broad-billed fairywren, Chenorhamphus grayi
- Emperor fairywren, Malurus cyanocephalus
- White-shouldered fairywren, Malurus alboscapulatus

== Honeyeaters ==
Order: Passeriformes Family: Meliphagidae

The honeyeaters are a large and diverse family of small to medium-sized birds most common in Australia and New Guinea. They are nectar feeders and closely resemble other nectar-feeding passerines.

- Dark-eared myza, Myza celebensis (E)
- White-eared myza, Myza sarasinorum (E)
- Plain honeyeater, Pycnopygius ixoides
- Marbled honeyeater, Pycnopygius cinereus
- Streak-headed honeyeater, Pycnopygius stictocephalus
- Puff-backed honeyeater, Meliphaga aruensis
- Streak-breasted honeyeater, Territornis reticulata (E)
- Orange-cheeked honeyeater, Oreornis chrysogenys (E)
- Forest honeyeater, Microptilotis montanus
- Mottled honeyeater, Microptilotis mimikae
- Yellow-gaped honeyeater, Microptilotis flavirictus
- Mountain honeyeater, Microptilotis orientalis
- Scrub honeyeater, Microptilotis albonotatus
- Mimic honeyeater, Microptilotis analogus
- Graceful honeyeater, Microptilotis gracilis
- Black-throated honeyeater, Caligavis subfrenata
- Obscure honeyeater, Caligavis obscura
- Sooty melidectes, Melidectes fuscus
- Short-bearded melidectes, Melidectes nouhuysi (E)
- Ornate melidectes, Melidectes torquatus
- Cinnamon-browed melidectes, Melidectes ochromelas
- Vogelkop melidectes, Melidectes leucostephes (E)
- Belford's melidectes, Melidectes belfordi
- Yellow-browed melidectes, Melidectes rufocrissalis
- Varied honeyeater, Gavicalis versicolor
- Brown-backed honeyeater, Ramsayornis modestus
- Rufous-banded honeyeater, Conopophila albogularis
- Arfak honeyeater, Melipotes gymnops (E)
- Smoky honeyeater, Melipotes fumigatus
- Foja honeyeater, Melipotes carolae (E)
- Macgregor's honeyeater, Macgregoria pulchra
- Long-billed honeyeater, Melilestes megarhynchus
- Olive straightbill, Timeliopsis fulvigula
- Tawny straightbill, Timeliopsis griseigula
- Seram myzomela, Myzomela blasii (E)
- Ruby-throated myzomela, Myzomela eques
- Dusky myzomela, Myzomela obscura
- Red myzomela, Myzomela cruentata
- Papuan black myzomela, Myzomela nigrita
- Alor myzomela, Myzomela prawiradilagae (E)
- Crimson-hooded myzomela, Myzomela kuehni (E)
- Red-headed myzomela, Myzomela erythrocephala
- Sumba myzomela, Myzomela dammermani (E)
- Rote myzomela, Myzomela irianawidodoae (E)
- Elfin myzomela, Myzomela adolphinae
- Sulawesi myzomela, Myzomela chloroptera (E)
- Taliabu myzomela, Myzomela wahe (E)
- Wakolo myzomela, Myzomela wakoloensis (E)
- Banda myzomela, Myzomela boiei (E)
- Black-breasted myzomela, Myzomela vulnerata (E)
- Red-collared myzomela, Myzomela rosenbergii
- Green-backed honeyeater, Glycichaera fallax
- Leaden honeyeater, Ptiloprora plumbea
- Yellow-streaked honeyeater, Ptiloprora meekiana
- Rufous-sided honeyeater, Ptiloprora erythropleura (E)
- Mayr's honeyeater, Ptiloprora mayri
- Gray-streaked honeyeater, Ptiloprora perstriata
- Sunda honeyeater, Lichmera lombokia (E)
- Olive honeyeater, Lichmera argentauris (E)
- Brown honeyeater, Lichmera indistincta
- White-tufted honeyeater, Lichmera squamata (E)
- Silver-eared honeyeater, Lichmera alboauricularis
- Buru honeyeater, Lichmera deningeri (E)
- Seram honeyeater, Lichmera monticola (E)
- Yellow-eared honeyeater, Lichmera flavicans (E)
- Black-chested honeyeater, Lichmera notabilis (E)
- Blue-faced honeyeater, Entomyzon cyanotis
- White-throated honeyeater, Melithreptus albogularis
- Tawny-breasted honeyeater, Xanthotis flaviventer
- Spotted honeyeater, Xanthotis polygrammus
- White-streaked friarbird, Melitograis gilolensis (E)
- Little friarbird, Philemon citreogularis
- Meyer's friarbird, Philemon meyeri
- Timor friarbird, Philemon inornatus (E)
- Gray friarbird, Philemon kisserensis (E)
- Brass's friarbird, Philemon brassi (E)
- Dusky friarbird, Philemon fuscicapillus (E)
- Buru friarbird, Philemon moluccensis (E)
- Tanimbar friarbird, Philemon plumigenis (E)
- Seram friarbird, Philemon subcorniculatus (E)
- Helmeted friarbird, Philemon buceroides
- Noisy friarbird, Philemon corniculatus

== Thornbills and allies ==
Order: Passeriformes Family: Acanthizidae

The Acanthizidae are small- to medium-sized birds with short rounded wings, slender bills, long legs, and a short tail. The golden-bellied gerygone is the only member of the family found in mainland Asia.

- Goldenface, Pachycare flavogrisea
- Rusty mouse-warbler, Crateroscelis murina
- Bicolored mouse-warbler, Crateroscelis nigrorufa
- Mountain mouse-warbler, Crateroscelis robusta
- Tropical scrubwren, Sericornis beccarii
- Large scrubwren, Sericornis nouhuysi
- Vogelkop scrubwren, Sericornis rufescens (E)
- Buff-faced scrubwren, Sericornis perspicillatus
- Papuan scrubwren, Sericornis papuensis
- Gray-green scrubwren, Sericornis arfakianus
- Pale-billed scrubwren, Sericornis spilodera
- Papuan thornbill, Acanthiza murina
- Gray thornbill, Acanthiza cinerea
- Green-backed gerygone, Gerygone chloronota
- Fairy gerygone, Gerygone palpebrosa
- Biak gerygone, Gerygone hypoxantha
- Yellow-bellied gerygone, Gerygone chrysogaster
- Large-billed gerygone, Gerygone magnirostris
- Golden-bellied gerygone, Gerygone sulphurea
- Plain gerygone, Gerygone inornata (E)
- Rufous-sided gerygone, Gerygone dorsalis
- Brown-breasted gerygone, Gerygone ruficollis
- Mangrove gerygone, Gerygone levigaster

== Pseudo-babblers ==
Order: Passeriformes Family: Pomatostomidae

The pseudo-babblers are small to medium-sized birds endemic to Australia and New Guinea. They are ground-feeding omnivores and highly social.

- Papuan babbler, Pomatostomus isidorei
- Gray-crowned babbler, Pomatostomus temporalis

== Logrunners ==
Order: Passeriformes Family: Orthonychidae

The Orthonychidae is a family of birds with a single genus, Orthonyx, which comprises two types of passerine birds endemic to Australia and New Guinea, the logrunners and the chowchilla. Both use stiffened tails to brace themselves when feeding.

- Papuan logrunner, Orthonyx novaeguineae

== Quail-thrushes and jewel-babblers ==
Order: Passeriformes Family: Cinclosomatidae

The Cinclosomatidae is a family containing jewel-babblers and quail-thrushes.

- Painted quail-thrush, Cinclosoma ajax
- Spotted jewel-babbler, Ptilorrhoa leucosticta
- Blue jewel-babbler, Ptilorrhoa caerulescens
- Dimorphic jewel-babbler, Ptilorrhoa geislerorum (A)
- Chestnut-backed jewel-babbler, Ptilorrhoa castanonota

== Cuckooshrikes ==
Order: Passeriformes Family: Campephagidae

The cuckooshrikes are small to medium-sized passerine birds. They are predominantly greyish with white and black, although some minivet species are brightly coloured.

- Fiery minivet, Pericrocotus igneus
- Small minivet, Pericrocotus cinnamomeus
- Gray-chinned minivet, Pericrocotus solaris
- Sunda minivet, Pericrocotus miniatus (E)
- Flores minivet, Pericrocotus lansbergei (E)
- Scarlet minivet, Pericrocotus speciosus
- Ashy minivet, Pericrocotus divaricatus
- Stout-billed cuckooshrike, Coracina caeruleogrisea
- Hooded cuckooshrike, Coracina longicauda
- Pied cuckooshrike, Coracina bicolor (E)
- Cerulean cuckooshrike, Coracina temminckii (E)
- Barred cuckooshrike, Coracina lineata
- Boyer's cuckooshrike, Coracina boyeri
- Black-faced cuckooshrike, Coracina novaehollandiae
- White-bellied cuckooshrike, Coracina papuensis
- Moluccan cuckooshrike, Coracina atriceps (E)
- Bar-bellied cuckooshrike, Coracina striata
- Sunda cuckooshrike, Coracina larvata (E)
- Javan cuckooshrike, Coracina javensis (E)
- Wallacean cuckooshrike, Coracina personata (E)
- Buru cuckooshrike, Coracina fortis (E)
- White-rumped cuckooshrike, Coracina leucopygia (E)
- Slaty cuckooshrike, Coracina schistacea (E)
- Golden cuckooshrike, Campochaera sloetii
- White-shouldered triller, Lalage sueurii (E)
- Black-browed triller, Lalage atrovirens
- White-browed triller, Lalage moesta (E)
- Varied triller, Lalage leucomela
- White-rumped triller, Lalage leucopygialis (E)
- Pied triller, Lalage nigra
- Rufous-bellied triller, Lalage aurea (E)
- Lesser cuckooshrike, Lalage fimbriata
- Pygmy cuckooshrike, Celebesica abbotti (E)
- Halmahera cuckooshrike, Celebesia parvula (E)
- Black-bellied cicadabird, Edolisoma montanum
- Pale cicadabird, Edolisoma ceramense (E)
- Kai cicadabird, Edolisoma dispar (E)
- Pale-shouldered cicadabird, Edolisoma dohertyi (E)
- Papuan cicadabird, Edolisoma incertum
- Sulawesi cicadabird, Edolisoma morio (E)
- Sula cicadabird, Edolisoma sula (E)
- Common cicadabird, Edolisoma tenuirostre
- Gray-headed cicadabird, Edolisoma schisticeps
- Black cicadabird, Edolisoma melas

== Sittellas ==
Order: Passeriformes Family: Neosittidae

The sittellas are a family of small passerine birds. They resemble treecreepers, but have soft tails.

- Black sittella, Daphoenositta miranda
- Papuan sittella, Daphoenositta papuensis

== Whipbirds and wedgebills ==
Order: Passeriformes Family: Psophodidae

The Psophodidae is a family containing whipbirds and wedgebills.

- Papuan whipbird, Androphobus viridis (E)

== Ploughbill ==
Order: Passeriformes Family: Eulacestomidae

The wattled ploughbill was long thought to be related to the whistlers (Pachycephalidae), and shriketits (formerly Pachycephalidae, now often treated as its own family).

- Wattled ploughbill, Eulacestoma nigropectus

== Australo-Papuan bellbirds ==
Order: Passeriformes Family: Oreoicidae

The three species contained in the family have been moved around between different families for fifty years. A series of studies of the DNA of Australian birds between 2006 and 2001 found strong support for treating the three genera as a new family, which was formally named in 2016.

- Rufous-naped bellbird, Aleadryas rufinucha
- Piping bellbird, Ornorectes cristatus

== Tit berrypecker and crested berrypecker ==
Order: Passeriformes Family: Paramythiidae

Paramythiidae is a very small bird family restricted to the mountain forests of New Guinea. The two species are colourful medium-sized birds which feed on fruit and some insects.

- Tit berrypecker, Oreocharis arfaki
- Crested berrypecker, Paramythia montium

== Vireos, shrike-babblers, and erpornis ==
Order: Passeriformes Family: Vireonidae

Most of the members of this family are found in the New World. However, the shrike-babblers and erpornis, which only slightly resemble the "true" vireos and greenlets, are found in South East Asia.

- Pied shrike-babbler, Pteruthius flaviscapis (E)
- White-browed shrike-babbler, Pteruthius aeralatus
- Trilling shrike-babbler, Pteruthius aenobarbus (E)
- White-bellied erpornis, Erpornis zantholeuca

== Whistlers and allies ==
Order: Passeriformes Family: Pachycephalidae

The family Pachycephalidae includes the whistlers, shrikethrushes, and some of the pitohuis.

- Rusty pitohui, Pseudorectes ferrugineus
- White-bellied pitohui, Pseudorectes incertus
- Gray shrikethrush, Colluricincla harmonica
- Sooty shrikethrush, Colluricincla tenebrosa
- Waigeo shrikethrush, Colluricincla affinis (E)
- Mamberamo shrikethrush, Colluricincla obscura
- Sepik-Ramu shrikethrush, Colluricincla tappenbecki
- Arafura shrikethrush, Colluricincla megarhyncha
- Rufous shrikethrush, Colluricincla rufogaster
- Black pitohui, Melanorectes nigrescens
- Sangihe whistler, Coracornis sanghirensis (E)
- Maroon-backed whistler, Coracornis raveni (E)
- Bare-throated whistler, Pachycephala nudigula (E)
- Fawn-breasted whistler, Pachycephala orpheus (E)
- Regent whistler, Pachycephala schlegelii
- Vogelkop whistler, Pachycephala meyeri (E)
- Sclater's whistler, Pachycephala soror
- Rusty-breasted whistler, Pachycephala fulvotincta
- Yellow-throated whistler, Pachycephala macrorhyncha
- Black-chinned whistler, Pachycephala mentalis
- Baliem whistler, Pachycephala balim
- Black-tailed whistler, Pachycephala melanura
- Lorentz's whistler, Pachycephala lorentzi
- Golden-backed whistler, Pachycephala aurea
- Bornean whistler, Pachycephala hypoxantha
- Sulphur-bellied whistler, Pachycephala sulfuriventer (E)
- Mangrove whistler, Pachycephala cinerea
- Island whistler, Pachycephala phaionota (E)
- Biak whistler, Pachycephala melanorhyncha (E)
- Rusty whistler, Pachycephala hyperythra
- Gray whistler, Pachycephala simplex
- Wallacean whistler, Pachycephala arctitorquis (E)
- Drab whistler, Pachycephala griseonota (E)
- White-bellied whistler, Pachycephala leucogastra
- Black-headed whistler, Pachycephala monacha

== Old World orioles ==
Order: Passeriformes Family: Oriolidae

The Old World orioles are colourful passerine birds which are not closely related to the New World orioles.

- Hooded pitohui, Pitohui dichrous
- Raja Ampat pitohui, Pitohui cerviniventris
- Northern variable pitohui, Pitohui kirhocephalus
- Southern variable pitohui, Pitohui uropygialis
- Timor oriole, Oriolus melanotis (E)
- Buru oriole, Oriolus bouroensis (E)
- Tanimbar oriole, Oriolus decipiens (E)
- Seram oriole, Oriolus forsteni (E)
- Halmahera oriole, Oriolus phaeochromus (E)
- Brown oriole, Oriolus szalayi
- Olive-backed oriole, Oriolus sagittatus
- Green oriole, Oriolus flavocinctus
- Dark-throated oriole, Oriolus xanthonotus
- Black-naped oriole, Oriolus chinensis
- Black-hooded oriole, Oriolus xanthornus
- Black oriole, Oriolus hosii
- Black-and-crimson oriole, Oriolus cruentus
- Wetar figbird, Sphecotheres hypoleucus (E)
- Green figbird, Sphecotheres viridis (E)
- Australasian figbird, Sphecotheres vieilloti

== Boatbills ==
Order: Passeriformes Family: Machaerirhynchidae

The boatbills have affinities to woodswallows and butcherbirds, and are distributed across New Guinea and northern Queensland.

- Black-breasted boatbill, Machaerirhynchus nigripectus
- Yellow-breasted boatbill, Machaerirhynchus flaviventer

== Woodswallows, bellmagpies and allies ==
Order: Passeriformes Family: Artamidae

The woodswallows are soft-plumaged, somber-coloured passerine birds. They are smooth, agile flyers with moderately large, semi-triangular wings. The cracticids: currawongs, bellmagpies and butcherbirds, are similar to the other corvids. They have large, straight bills and mostly black, white or grey plumage. All are omnivorous to some degree.

- Ivory-backed woodswallow, Artamus monachus (E)
- Great woodswallow, Artamus maximus
- White-breasted woodswallow, Artamus leucorynchus
- Black-faced woodswallow, Artamus cinereus
- Mountain peltops, Peltops montanus
- Lowland peltops, Peltops blainvillii
- Black-backed butcherbird, Cracticus mentalis
- Hooded butcherbird, Cracticus cassicus
- Black butcherbird, Cracticus quoyi
- Australian magpie, Gymnorhina tibicen

== Mottled berryhunter ==
Order: Passeriformes Family: Rhagologidae

The mottled berryhunter or mottled whistler (Rhagologus leucostigma) is a species of bird whose relationships are unclear but most likely related to the woodswallows, boatbills and butcherbirds.

- Mottled berryhunter, Rhagologus leucostigma

== Vangas, helmetshrikes, and allies ==
Order: Passeriformes Family: Vangidae

The family Vangidae is highly variable, though most members of it resemble true shrikes to some degree.

- Large woodshrike, Tephrodornis gularis
- Bar-winged flycatcher-shrike, Hemipus picatus
- Black-winged flycatcher-shrike, Hemipus hirundinaceus
- Rufous-winged philentoma, Philentoma pyrhoptera
- Maroon-breasted philentoma, Philentoma velata

== Bristlehead ==
Order: Passeriformes Family: Pityriasidae

The Bornean bristlehead (Pityriasis gymnocephala), also variously known as the bristled shrike, bald-headed crow or the bald-headed wood-shrike, is the only member of the passerine family Pityriasidae and genus Pityriasis. It is an enigmatic and uncommon species of the rainforest canopy of the island of Borneo, to which it is endemic.

- Bornean bristlehead, Pityriasis gymnocephala

== Ioras ==
Order: Passeriformes Family: Aegithinidae

The ioras are bulbul-like birds of open forest or thorn scrub, but whereas that group tends to be drab in colouration, ioras are sexually dimorphic, with the males being brightly plumaged in yellows and greens.

- Common iora, Aegithina tiphia
- Green iora, Aegithina viridissima

== Fantails ==
Order: Passeriformes Family: Rhipiduridae

The fantails are small insectivorous birds with longish, frequently fanned, tails.

- Drongo fantail, Chaetorhynchus papuensis
- Cerulean flycatcher, Eutrichomyias rowleyi (E)
- Black fantail, Rhipidura atra
- Spotted fantail, Rhipidura perlata
- Cinnamon-tailed fantail, Rhipidura fuscorufa (E)
- Northern fantail, Rhipidura rufiventris
- Brown-capped fantail, Rhipidura diluta (E)
- Sooty thicket-fantail, Rhipidura threnothorax
- Black thicket-fantail, Rhipidura maculipectus
- White-bellied thicket-fantail, Rhipidura leucothorax
- Willie-wagtail, Rhipidura leucophrys
- Malaysian pied fantail, Rhipidura javanica
- White-throated fantail, Rhipidura albicollis
- Rufous-tailed fantail, Rhipidura phoenicura (E)
- White-bellied fantail, Rhipidura euryura (E)
- Rufous-backed fantail, Rhipidura rufidorsa
- Dimorphic fantail, Rhipidura brachyrhyncha
- Sulawesi fantail, Rhipidura teysmanni
- Peleng fantail, Rhipidura habibiei (E)
- Taliabu fantail, Rhipidura sulaensis (E)
- Tawny-backed fantail, Rhipidura superflua (E)
- Streak-breasted fantail, Rhipidura dedemi (E)
- Long-tailed fantail, Rhipidura opistherythra (E)
- Rufous fantail, Rhipidura rufifrons
- Arafura fantail, Rhipidura dryas
- Friendly fantail, Rhipidura albolimbata
- Chestnut-bellied fantail, Rhipidura hyperythra
- Mangrove fantail, Rhipidura phasiana

== Drongos ==
Order: Passeriformes Family: Dicruridae

The drongos are mostly black or dark grey in colour, sometimes with metallic tints. They have long forked tails, and some Asian species have elaborate tail decorations. They have short legs and sit very upright when perched, like a shrike. They flycatch or take prey from the ground.

- Black drongo, Dicrurus macrocercus
- Ashy drongo, Dicrurus leucophaeus
- Crow-billed drongo, Dicrurus annectens
- Bronzed drongo, Dicrurus aeneus
- Lesser racket-tailed drongo, Dicrurus remifer
- Hair-crested drongo, Dicrurus hottentottus
- Sulawesi drongo, Dicrurus montanus (E)
- Sumatran drongo, Dicrurus sumatranus (E)
- Wallacean drongo, Dicrurus densus (E)
- Spangled drongo, Dicrurus bracteatus
- Greater racket-tailed drongo, Dicrurus paradiseus

== Birds-of-paradise ==
Order: Passeriformes Family: Paradisaeidae

The birds-of-paradise are best known for the striking plumage possessed by the males of most species, in particular highly elongated and elaborate feathers extending from the tail, wings or head. These plumes are used in courtship displays to attract females.

- Paradise-crow, Lycocorax pyrrhopterus (E)
- Trumpet manucode, Phonygammus keraudrenii
- Crinkle-collared manucode, Manucodia chalybatus
- Jobi manucode, Manucodia jobiensis
- Glossy-mantled manucode, Manucodia ater
- King-of-Saxony bird-of-paradise, Pteridophora alberti
- Carola's parotia, Parotia carolae
- Bronze parotia, Parotia berlepschi (A)
- Western parotia, Parotia sefilata (E)
- Lawes's parotia, Parotia lawesii
- Twelve-wired bird-of-paradise, Seleucidis melanoleucus
- Black-billed sicklebill, Drepanornis albertisi
- Pale-billed sicklebill, Drepanornis bruijnii
- Standardwing bird-of-paradise, Semioptera wallacii (E)
- Vogelkop lophorina, Lophorina niedda (E)
- Greater lophorina, Lophorina superba
- Magnificent riflebird, Ptiloris magnificus
- Growling riflebird, Ptiloris intercedens
- Black sicklebill, Epimachus fastuosus
- Brown sicklebill, Epimachus meyeri
- Long-tailed paradigalla, Paradigalla carunculata (E)
- Short-tailed paradigalla, Paradigalla brevicauda
- Splendid astrapia, Astrapia splendidissima
- Arfak astrapia, Astrapia nigra (E)
- Ribbon-tailed astrapia, Astrapia mayeri
- King bird-of-paradise, Cicinnurus regius
- Wilson's bird-of-paradise, Cicinnurus respublica (E)
- Magnificent bird-of-paradise, Cicinnurus magnificus
- Red bird-of-paradise, Paradisaea rubra (E)
- Lesser bird-of-paradise, Paradisaea minor
- Raggiana bird-of-paradise, Paradisaea raggiana (A)
- Greater bird-of-paradise, Paradisaea apoda

== Ifrita ==
Order: Passeriformes Family: Ifritidae

The ifritas are a small and insectivorous passerine currently placed in the monotypic family, Ifritidae. Previously, the ifrit has been placed in a plethora of families including Cinclosomatidae or Monarchidae. They are considered an ancient relic species endemic to New Guinea.

- Blue-capped ifrita, Ifrita kowaldi

== Monarch flycatchers ==
Order: Passeriformes Family: Monarchidae

The monarch flycatchers are small to medium-sized insectivorous passerines which hunt by gleaning, hovering or flycatching.

- Black-naped monarch, Hypothymis azurea
- Pale-blue monarch, Hypothymis puella
- Rufous paradise-flycatcher, Terpsiphone cinnamomea
- Japanese paradise-flycatcher, Terpsiphone atrocaudata (A)
- Amur paradise-flycatcher, Terpsiphone incei
- Blyth's paradise-flycatcher, Terpsiphone affinis
- Indian paradise-flycatcher, Terpsiphone paradisi (A)
- White-naped monarch, Carterornis pileatus (E)
- Loetoe monarch, Carterornis castus (E)
- Golden monarch, Carterornis chrysomela
- Island monarch, Monarcha cinerascens
- Black-faced monarch, Monarcha melanopsis
- Black-winged monarch, Monarcha frater
- Fan-tailed monarch, Symposiachrus axillaris
- Rufous monarch, Symposiachrus rubiensis
- Flores monarch, Symposiachrus sacerdotum (E)
- Black-chinned monarch, Symposiachrus boanensis (E)
- Spectacled monarch, Symposiachrus trivirgatus
- White-tailed monarch, Symposiachrus leucurus (E)
- White-tipped monarch, Symposiachrus everetti (E)
- Black-tipped monarch, Symposiachrus loricatus (E)
- Kofiau monarch, Symposiachrus julianae (E)
- Biak monarch, Symposiachrus brehmii (E)
- Hooded monarch, Symposiachrus manadensis
- Black-bibbed monarch, Symposiachrus mundus (E)
- Spot-winged monarch, Symposiachrus guttula
- Frilled monarch, Arses telescophthalmus
- Ochre-collared monarch, Arses insularis
- Magpie-lark, Grallina cyanoleuca
- Torrent-lark, Grallina bruijni
- Biak flycatcher, Myiagra atra (E)
- Moluccan flycatcher, Myiagra galeata (E)
- Leaden flycatcher, Myiagra rubecula
- Broad-billed flycatcher, Myiagra ruficollis
- Satin flycatcher, Myiagra cyanoleuca
- Restless flycatcher, Myiagra inquieta (A)
- Paperbark flycatcher, Myiagra nana
- Shining flycatcher, Myiagra alecto

== Melampittas ==
Order: Passeriformes Family: Melampittidae

They are little studied and before being established as a family in 2014 their taxonomic relationships with other birds were uncertain, being considered at one time related variously to the pittas, Old World babblers and birds-of-paradise.

- Lesser melampitta, Melampitta lugubris
- Greater melampitta, Melampitta gigantea

== Crested shrikejay ==
Order: Passeriformes Family: Platylophidae

Until 2018 this species was included in family Corvidae, but genetic and morphological evidence place it in its own family.

- Crested shrikejay, Platylophus galericulatus

== Shrikes ==
Order: Passeriformes Family: Laniidae

Shrikes are passerine birds known for the habit of some species of catching other birds and small animals and impaling the uneaten portions of their bodies on thorns. A shrike's beak is hooked, like that of a typical bird of prey.

- Tiger shrike, Lanius tigrinus
- Brown shrike, Lanius cristatus
- Long-tailed shrike, Lanius schach

== Crows, jays, and magpies ==
Order: Passeriformes Family: Corvidae

The family Corvidae includes crows, ravens, jays, choughs, magpies, treepies, nutcrackers, and ground jays. Corvids are above average in size among the Passeriformes, and some of the larger species show high levels of intelligence.

- Black magpie, Platysmurus leucopterus
- Common green-magpie, Cissa chinensis
- Javan green-magpie, Cissa thalassina
- Bornean green-magpie, Cissa jefferyi
- Sumatran treepie, Dendrocitta occipitalis (E)
- Bornean treepie, Dendrocitta cinerascens
- Racket-tailed treepie, Crypsirina temia
- House crow, Corvus splendens
- Banggai crow, Corvus unicolor (E)
- Slender-billed crow, Corvus enca
- Violet crow, Corvus violaceus
- Piping crow, Corvus typicus (E)
- Flores crow, Corvus florensis (E)
- Long-billed crow, Corvus validus (E)
- Brown-headed crow, Corvus fuscicapillus (E)
- Gray crow, Corvus tristis
- Large-billed crow, Corvus macrorhynchos
- Torresian crow, Corvus orru

== Satinbirds ==
Order: Passeriformes Family: Cnemophilidae

They are a family of passerine birds which consists of four species found in the mountain forests of New Guinea. They were originally thought to be part of the birds-of-paradise family Paradisaeidae until genetic research suggested that the birds are not closely related to birds-of-paradise at all and are perhaps closer to berry peckers and longbills (Melanocharitidae). The current evidence suggests that their closest relatives may be the cuckoo-shrikes (Campephagidae).

- Loria's satinbird, Cnemophilus loriae
- Crested satinbird, Cnemophilus macgregorii
- Yellow-breasted satinbird, Loboparadisea sericea

== Berrypeckers and longbills ==
Order: Passeriformes Family: Melanocharitidae

The Melanocharitidae are medium-sized birds which feed on fruit and some insects and other invertebrates. They have drab plumage in greys, browns or black and white. The berrypeckers resemble stout short-billed honeyeaters, and the longbills are like drab sunbirds.

- Obscure berrypecker, Melanocharis arfakiana
- Black berrypecker, Melanocharis nigra
- Mid-mountain berrypecker, Melanocharis longicauda
- Fan-tailed berrypecker, Melanocharis versteri
- Satin berrypecker, Melanocharis citreola (E)
- Streaked berrypecker, Melanocharis striativentris
- Spotted berrypecker, Melanocharis crassirostris
- Yellow-bellied longbill, Toxorhamphus novaeguineae
- Slaty-chinned longbill, Toxorhamphus poliopterus
- Spectacled longbill, Oedistoma iliolophus
- Pygmy longbill, Oedistoma pygmaeum

== Australasian robins ==
Order: Passeriformes Family: Petroicidae

Most species of Petroicidae have a stocky build with a large rounded head, a short straight bill and rounded wingtips. They occupy a wide range of wooded habitats, from subalpine to tropical rainforest, and mangrove swamp to semi-arid scrubland. All are primarily insectivores, although a few supplement their diet with seeds.

- Greater ground-robin, Amalocichla sclateriana
- Lesser ground-robin, Amalocichla incerta
- Torrent flycatcher, Monachella muelleriana
- Golden-bellied flyrobin, Microeca hemixantha (E)
- Lemon-bellied flycatcher, Microeca flavigaster
- Yellow-legged flycatcher, Microeca griseoceps
- Olive flyrobin, Microeca flavovirescens
- Papuan flycatcher, Microeca papuana
- Garnet robin, Eugerygone rubra
- Subalpine robin, Petroica bivittata
- Snow Mountain robin, Petroica archboldi (E)
- White-faced robin, Tregellasia leucops
- Mangrove robin, Eopsaltria pulverulenta
- Black-chinned robin, Poecilodryas brachyura
- Black-sided robin, Poecilodryas hypoleuca
- Olive-yellow robin, Poecilodryas placens
- Black-throated robin, Poecilodryas albonotata
- White-winged robin, Peneothello sigillata
- Smoky robin, Peneothello cryptoleuca (E)
- White-rumped robin, Peneothello bimaculata
- Blue-gray robin, Peneothello cyanus
- Ashy robin, Heteromyias albispecularis
- Green-backed robin, Pachycephalopsis hattamensis
- White-eyed robin, Pachycephalopsis poliosoma
- Papuan scrub-robin, Drymodes beccarii

== Rail-babbler ==
Order: Passeriformes Family: Eupetidae

The Malaysian rail-babbler is a rail-like passerine bird which inhabits the floor of primary forest in the Malay Peninsula and Sumatra. It is the only member of its family.

- Malaysian rail-babbler, Eupetes macrocerus

== Fairy flycatchers ==
Order: Passeriformes Family: Stenostiridae

Most of the species of this small family are found in Africa, though a few inhabit tropical Asia. They are not closely related to other birds called "flycatchers".

- Gray-headed canary-flycatcher, Culicicapa ceylonensis
- Citrine canary-flycatcher, Culicicapa helianthea

== Tits, chickadees, and titmice ==
Order: Passeriformes Family: Paridae

The Paridae are mainly small stocky woodland species with short stout bills. Some have crests. They are adaptable birds, with a mixed diet including seeds and insects.

- Sultan tit, Melanochlora sultanea
- Cinereous tit, Parus cinereus

== Larks ==
Order: Passeriformes Family: Alaudidae

Larks are small terrestrial birds with often extravagant songs and display flights. Most larks are fairly dull in appearance. Their food is insects and seeds.

- Horsfield's bushlark, Mirafra javanica

== Cisticolas and allies ==
Order: Passeriformes Family: Cisticolidae

The Cisticolidae are warblers found mainly in warmer southern regions of the Old World. They are generally very small birds of drab brown or grey appearance found in open country such as grassland or scrub.

- Common tailorbird, Orthotomus sutorius
- Dark-necked tailorbird, Orthotomus atrogularis
- Ashy tailorbird, Orthotomus ruficeps
- Olive-backed tailorbird, Orthotomus sepium (E)
- Rufous-tailed tailorbird, Orthotomus sericeus
- Brown prinia, Prinia polychroa
- Hill prinia, Prinia superciliaris
- Bar-winged prinia, Prinia familiaris (E)
- Yellow-bellied prinia, Prinia flaviventris
- Plain prinia, Prinia inornata
- Zitting cisticola, Cisticola juncidis
- Golden-headed cisticola, Cisticola exilis

== Reed warblers and allies ==
Order: Passeriformes Family: Acrocephalidae

The members of this family are usually rather large for "warblers". Most are rather plain olivaceous brown above with much yellow to beige below. They are usually found in open woodland, reedbeds, or tall grass. The family occurs mostly in southern to western Eurasia and surroundings, but it also ranges far into the Pacific, with some species in Africa.

- Black-browed reed warbler, Acrocephalus bistrigiceps (A)
- Oriental reed warbler, Acrocephalus orientalis
- Clamorous reed warbler, Acrocephalus stentoreus
- Australian reed warbler, Acrocephalus australis

== Grassbirds and allies ==
Order: Passeriformes Family: Locustellidae

Locustellidae are a family of small insectivorous songbirds found mainly in Eurasia, Africa, and the Australian region. They are smallish birds with tails that are usually long and pointed, and tend to be drab brownish or buffy all over.

- Gray's grasshopper warbler, Helopsaltes fasciolatus
- Sakhalin grasshopper warbler, Helopsaltes amnicola
- Pallas's grasshopper warbler, Helopsaltes certhiola
- Middendorff's grasshopper warbler, Helopsaltes ochotensis (A)
- Lanceolated warbler, Locustella lanceolata
- Sulawesi bush warbler, Locustella castanea (E)
- Seram bush warbler, Locustella musculus (E)
- Taliabu bush warbler, Locustella portenta (E)
- Buru bush warbler, Locustella disturbans (E)
- Javan bush warbler, Locustella montis (E)
- Fly River grassbird, Poodytes albolimbatus
- Little grassbird, Poodytes gramineus
- Malia, Malia grata (E)
- Buff-banded bushbird, Cincloramphus bivittatus (E)
- Tawny grassbird, Cincloramphus timoriensis
- Papuan grassbird, Cincloramphus macrurus
- Striated grassbird, Megalurus palustris

== Cupwings ==
Order: Passeriformes Family: Pnoepygidae

The members of this small family are found in mountainous parts of South and South East Asia.

- Pygmy cupwing, Pnoepyga pusilla

== Swallows ==
Order: Passeriformes Family: Hirundinidae

The family Hirundinidae is adapted to aerial feeding. They have a slender streamlined body, long pointed wings, and a short bill with a wide gape. The feet are adapted to perching rather than walking, and the front toes are partially joined at the base.

- Bank swallow, Riparia riparia (A)
- Barn swallow, Hirundo rustica
- Pacific swallow, Hirundo tahitica
- Red-rumped swallow, Cecropis daurica
- Striated swallow, Cecropis striolata
- Fairy martin, Petrochelidon ariel
- Tree martin, Petrochelidon nigricans
- Asian house-martin, Delichon dasypus

== Bulbuls ==
Order: Passeriformes Family: Pycnonotidae

Bulbuls are medium-sized songbirds. Some are colourful with yellow, red, or orange vents, cheeks, throats, or supercilia, but most are drab, with uniform olive-brown to black plumage. Some species have distinct crests.

- Black-and-white bulbul, Brachypodius melanoleucos
- Puff-backed bulbul, Brachypodius eutilotus
- Black-headed bulbul, Brachypodius melanocephalos
- Spectacled bulbul, Rubigula erythropthalmos
- Gray-bellied bulbul, Rubigula cyaniventris
- Scaly-breasted bulbul, Rubigula squamata
- Ruby-throated bulbul, Rubigula dispar
- Bornean bulbul, Rubigula montis
- Straw-headed bulbul, Pycnonotus zeylanicus
- Cream-striped bulbul, Pycnonotus leucogrammicus (E)
- Spot-necked bulbul, Pycnonotus tympanistrigus (E)
- Red-whiskered bulbul, Pycnonotus jocosus (I)
- Sooty-headed bulbul, Pycnonotus aurigaster
- Blue-wattled bulbul, Pycnonotus nieuwenhuisii (E)
- Aceh bulbul, Pycnonotus snouckaerti (E)
- Orange-spotted bulbul, Pycnonotus bimaculatus
- Flavescent bulbul, Pycnonotus flavescens
- Yellow-vented bulbul, Pycnonotus goiavier
- Olive-winged bulbul, Pycnonotus plumosus
- Cream-eyed bulbul, Pycnonotus pseudosimplex
- Cream-vented bulbul, Pycnonotus simplex
- Red-eyed bulbul, Pycnonotus brunneus
- Hairy-backed bulbul, Tricholestes criniger
- Hook-billed bulbul, Setornis criniger
- Finsch's bulbul, Alophoixus finschii
- Yellow-bellied bulbul, Alophoixus phaeocephalus
- Gray-cheeked bulbul, Alophoixus tephrogenys
- Penan bulbul, Alophoixus ruficrissus
- Brown-cheeked bulbul, Alophoixus bres
- Ochraceous bulbul, Alophoixus ochraceus
- Sangihe golden-bulbul, Alophoixus platenae (E)
- Togian golden-bulbul, Alophoixus aureus (E)
- Sula golden-bulbul, Alophoixus longirostris
- Halmahera golden-bulbul, Alophoixus chloris (E)
- Obi golden-bulbul, Alophoixus lucasi (E)
- Buru golden-bulbul, Alophoixus mystacalis (E)
- Seram golden-bulbul, Alophoixus affinis (E)
- Buff-vented bulbul, Iole crypta
- Charlotte's bulbul, Iole charlottae
- Cinereous bulbul, Hemixos cinereus
- Sunda bulbul, Ixos virescens (E)
- Streaked bulbul, Ixos malaccensis

== Leaf warblers ==
Order: Passeriformes Family: Phylloscopidae

Leaf warblers are a family of small insectivorous birds found mostly in Eurasia and ranging into Wallacea and Africa. The species are of various sizes, often green-plumaged above and yellow below, or more subdued with greyish-green to greyish-brown colours.

- Yellow-browed warbler, Phylloscopus inornatus
- Eastern crowned warbler, Phylloscopus coronatus
- Japanese leaf warbler, Phylloscopus xanthodryas
- Arctic warbler, Phylloscopus borealis
- Kamchatka leaf warbler, Phylloscopus examinandus
- Chestnut-crowned warbler, Phylloscopus castaniceps
- Yellow-breasted warbler, Phylloscopus montis
- Sunda warbler, Phylloscopus grammiceps (E)
- Mountain leaf warbler, Phylloscopus trivirgatus
- Timor leaf warbler, Phylloscopus presbytes (E)
- Rote leaf warbler, Phylloscopus rotiensis (E)
- Sulawesi leaf warbler, Phylloscopus nesophilus (E)
- Lompobattang leaf warbler, Phylloscopus sarasinorum (E)
- Island leaf warbler, Phylloscopus poliocephalus
- Numfor leaf warbler, Phylloscopus maforensis (E)
- Biak leaf warbler, Phylloscopus misoriensis (E)

== Bush warblers and allies ==
Order: Passeriformes Family: Scotocercidae

The members of this family are found throughout Africa, Asia, and Polynesia. Their taxonomy is in flux, and some authorities place some genera in other families.

- Timor stubtail, Urosphena subulata (E)
- Bornean stubtail, Urosphena whiteheadi
- Javan tesia, Tesia superciliaris (E)
- Russet-capped tesia, Tesia everetti (E)
- Yellow-bellied warbler, Abroscopus superciliaris
- Mountain tailorbird, Phyllergates cuculatus
- Tanimbar bush warbler, Horornis carolinae (E)
- Aberrant bush warbler, Horornis flavolivaceus

== Long-tailed tits ==
Order: Passeriformes Family: Aegithalidae

Long-tailed tits are a group of small passerine birds with medium to long tails. They make woven bag nests in trees. Most eat a mixed diet which includes insects.

- Pygmy tit, Aegithalos exilis (E)

== White-eyes, yuhinas, and allies ==
Order: Passeriformes Family: Zosteropidae

The white-eyes are small birds of rather drab appearance, the plumage above being typically greenish-olive, but some species have a white or bright yellow throat, breast, or lower parts, and several have buff flanks. As the name suggests, many species have a white ring around each eyes.

- Chestnut-crested yuhina, Staphida everetti
- Javan gray-throated white-eye, Heleia javanicus (E)
- Gray-hooded white-eye, Heleia pinaiae (E)
- Pygmy white-eye, Heleia squamifrons
- Streak-headed white-eye, Heleia squamiceps (E)
- White-browed white-eye, Heleia superciliaris (E)
- Dark-crowned white-eye, Heleia dohertyi (E)
- Timor white-eye, Heleia muelleri (E)
- Flores white-eye, Heleia crassirostris (E)
- Yellow-spectacled white-eye, Heleia wallacei (E)
- Rufescent white-eye, Tephrozosterops stalkeri (E)
- Black-capped white-eye, Zosterops atricapilla
- Swinhoe's white-eye, Zosterops simplex
- Mountain black-eye, Zosterops emiliae
- Warbling white-eye, Zosterops japonicus
- Lemon-bellied white-eye, Zosterops chloris (E)
- Meratus white-eye, Zosterops meratusensis (E)
- Wakatobi white-eye, Zosterops flavissimus (E)
- Black-crowned white-eye, Zosterops atrifrons (E)
- Sangihe white-eye, Zosterops nehrkorni (E)
- Togian white-eye, Zosterops somadikartai (E)
- Sulawesi white-eye, Zosterops consobrinorum (E)
- Black-ringed white-eye, Zosterops anomalus (E)
- Black-fronted white-eye, Zosterops minor
- Cream-throated white-eye, Zosterops atriceps (E)
- Buru white-eye, Zosterops buruensis (E)
- Seram white-eye, Zosterops stalkeri (E)
- Javan white-eye, Zosterops flavus (E)
- Ashy-bellied white-eye, Zosterops citrinella
- Hume's white-eye, Zosterops auriventer
- Sangkar white-eye, Zosterops melanurus
- Everett's white-eye, Zosterops everetti
- Capped white-eye, Zosterops fuscicapilla
- Biak white-eye, Zosterops mysorensis (E)
- New Guinea white-eye, Zosterops novaeguineae
- Ambon white-eye, Zosterops kuehni (E)
- Great Kai white-eye, Zosterops grayi (E)
- Little Kai white-eye, Zosterops uropygialis (E)

== Tree-babblers, scimitar-babblers, and allies ==
Order: Passeriformes Family: Timaliidae

The members of this family are somewhat diverse in size and colouration, but are characterised by soft fluffy plumage.

- Chestnut-capped babbler, Timalia pileata
- Gray-cheeked tit-babbler, Mixornis flavicollis (E)
- Kangean tit-babbler, Mixornis prillwitzi (E)
- Pin-striped tit-babbler, Mixornis gularis
- Bold-striped tit-babbler, Mixornis bornensis
- Fluffy-backed tit-babbler, Macronus ptilosus
- Golden babbler, Cyanoderma chrysaeum
- Chestnut-winged babbler, Cyanoderma erythropterum
- Gray-hooded babbler, Cyanoderma bicolor
- Crescent-chested babbler, Cyanoderma melanothorax (E)
- Rufous-fronted babbler, Cyanoderma rufifrons
- Black laughingthrush, Melanocichla lugubris
- Bare-headed laughingthrush, Melanocichla calva
- Javan scimitar-babbler, Pomatorhinus montanus (E)
- Sunda scimitar-babbler, Pomatorhinus bornensis
- Black-throated babbler, Stachyris nigricollis
- White-breasted babbler, Stachyris grammiceps (E)
- Chestnut-rumped babbler, Stachyris maculata
- Gray-throated babbler, Stachyris nigriceps
- Gray-headed babbler, Stachyris poliocephala
- White-necked babbler, Stachyris leucotis
- White-bibbed babbler, Stachyris thoracica (E)
- Spot-necked babbler, Stachyris striolata

== Ground babblers and allies ==
Order: Passeriformes Family: Pellorneidae

These small to medium-sized songbirds have soft fluffy plumage but are otherwise rather diverse. Members of the genus Illadopsis are found in forests, but some other genera are birds of scrublands.

- Large wren-babbler, Turdinus macrodactylus
- Marbled wren-babbler, Turdinus marmoratus
- Black-throated wren-babbler, Turdinus atrigularis
- Sooty-capped babbler, Malacopteron affine
- Gray-breasted babbler, Malacopteron albogulare
- Scaly-crowned babbler, Malacopteron cinereum
- Rufous-crowned babbler, Malacopteron magnum
- Moustached babbler, Malacopteron magnirostre
- Black-capped babbler, Pellorneum capistratum
- Short-tailed babbler, Pellorneum malaccense
- Buff-breasted babbler, Pellorneum tickelli
- Sumatran babbler, Pellorneum buettikoferi (E)
- Temminck's babbler, Pellorneum pyrrogenys
- White-chested babbler, Pellorneum rostratum
- Ferruginous babbler, Pellorneum bicolor
- Sulawesi babbler, Pellorneum celebense (E)
- Abbott's babbler, Malacocincla abbotti
- Horsfield's babbler, Malacocincla sepiaria
- Black-browed babbler, Malacocincla perspicillata (E)
- Mountain wren-babbler, Gypsophila crassa
- Rusty-breasted wren-babbler, Gypsophila rufipectus (E)
- Striped wren-babbler, Kenopia striata
- Bornean wren-babbler, Ptilocichla leucogrammica
- Eyebrowed wren-babbler, Napothera epilepidota
- Sumatran wren-babbler, Napothera albostriata (E)

== Laughingthrushes and allies ==
Order: Passeriformes Family: Leiothrichidae

The members of this family are diverse in size and colouration, though those of genus Turdoides tend to be brown or greyish. The family is found in Africa, India, and southeast Asia.

- Brown fulvetta, Alcippe brunneicauda
- Javan fulvetta, Alcippe pyrrhoptera (E)
- Spotted crocias, Laniellus albonotatus (E)
- Long-tailed sibia, Heterophasia picaoides
- Silver-eared mesia, Leiothrix argentauris
- Rufous-fronted laughingthrush, Garrulax rufifrons (E)
- Sunda laughingthrush, Garrulax palliatus (E)
- Sumatran laughingthrush, Garrulax bicolor (E)
- Chestnut-capped laughingthrush, Pterorhinus mitratus
- Chestnut-hooded laughingthrush, Pterorhinus treacheri

== Nuthatches ==
Order: Passeriformes Family: Sittidae

Nuthatches are small woodland birds. They have the unusual ability to climb down trees head first, unlike other birds which can only go upwards. Nuthatches have big heads, short tails, and powerful bills and feet.

- Velvet-fronted nuthatch, Sitta frontalis
- Blue nuthatch, Sitta azurea

== Starlings ==
Order: Passeriformes Family: Sturnidae

Starlings are small to medium-sized passerine birds. Their flight is strong and direct and they are very gregarious. Their preferred habitat is fairly open country. They eat insects and fruit. Plumage is typically dark with a metallic sheen.

- Fiery-browed myna, Enodes erythrophris (E)
- Finch-billed myna, Scissirostrum dubium (E)
- Metallic starling, Aplonis metallica
- Yellow-eyed starling, Aplonis mystacea
- Tanimbar starling, Aplonis crassa (E)
- Long-tailed starling, Aplonis magna (E)
- Singing starling, Aplonis cantoroides
- Asian glossy starling, Aplonis panayensis
- Moluccan starling, Aplonis mysolensis (E)
- Short-tailed starling, Aplonis minor
- Sulawesi myna, Basilornis celebensis (E)
- Helmeted myna, Basilornis galeatus (E)
- Long-crested myna, Basilornis corythaix (E)
- White-necked myna, Streptocitta albicollis (E)
- Bare-eyed myna, Streptocitta albertinae (E)
- Yellow-faced myna, Mino dumontii
- Golden myna, Mino anais
- Common hill myna, Gracula religiosa
- Enggano myna, Gracula enganensis (E)
- Nias myna, Gracula robusta (E)
- Rosy starling, Pastor roseus (A)
- Daurian starling, Agropsar sturninus
- Chestnut-cheeked starling, Agropsar philippensis
- Javan pied starling, Gracupica jalla
- Bali myna, Leucopsar rothschildi (E)
- Common myna, Acridotheres tristis
- Black-winged starling, Acridotheres melanopterus (E)
- Jungle myna, Acridotheres fuscus (I)
- Javan myna, Acridotheres javanicus (E)
- Pale-bellied myna, Acridotheres cinereus (E)

== Thrushes and allies ==
Order: Passeriformes Family: Turdidae

The thrushes are a group of passerine birds that occur mainly in the Old World. They are plump, soft plumaged, small to medium-sized insectivores or sometimes omnivores, often feeding on the ground. Many have attractive songs.

- Geomalia, Zoothera heinrichi (E)
- Everett's thrush, Zoothera everetti
- Sunda thrush, Zoothera andromedae
- Scaly thrush, Zoothera dauma
- Russet-tailed thrush, Zoothera heinei
- Fawn-breasted thrush, Zoothera machiki (E)
- Sulawesi thrush, Cataponera turdoides (E)
- Fruit-hunter, Chlamydochaera jefferyi
- Sumatran cochoa, Cochoa beccarii (E)
- Javan cochoa, Cochoa azurea (E)
- Siberian thrush, Geokichla sibirica
- Buru thrush, Geokichla dumasi
- Seram thrush, Geokichla joiceyi (E)
- Chestnut-capped thrush, Geokichla interpres
- Enggano thrush, Geokichla leucolaema
- Chestnut-backed thrush, Geokichla dohertyi (E)
- Orange-banded thrush, Geokichla peronii (E)
- Slaty-backed thrush, Geokichla schistacea (E)
- Rusty-backed thrush, Geokichla erythronota (E)
- Red-and-black thrush, Geokichla mendeni (E)
- Orange-headed thrush, Geokichla citrina
- Eyebrowed thrush, Turdus obscurus
- Island thrush, Turdus poliocephalus

== Old World flycatchers ==
Order: Passeriformes Family: Muscicapidae

Old World flycatchers are a large group of small arboreal insectivores. The appearance of these birds is highly varied, but they mostly have weak songs and harsh calls.

- Gray-streaked flycatcher, Muscicapa griseisticta
- Dark-sided flycatcher, Muscicapa sibirica
- Ferruginous flycatcher, Muscicapa ferruginea
- Asian brown flycatcher, Muscicapa dauurica
- Sumba brown flycatcher, Muscicapa segregata (E)
- Sulawesi brown flycatcher, Muscicapa sodhii (E)
- Brown-streaked flycatcher, Muscicapa williamsoni
- Oriental magpie-robin, Copsychus saularis
- Rufous-tailed shama, Copsychus pyrropygus
- White-rumped shama, Copsychus malabaricus
- White-crowned shama, Copsychus stricklandii
- Rufous-browed flycatcher, Anthipes solitaris
- Matinan blue flycatcher, Cyornis sanfordi (E)
- Blue-fronted flycatcher, Cyornis hoevelli (E)
- Timor blue flycatcher, Cyornis hyacinthinus (E)
- White-tailed flycatcher, Cyornis concretus
- Rück's blue flycatcher, Cyornis ruckii (E)
- Pale blue flycatcher, Cyornis unicolor
- Javan blue flycatcher, Cyornis banyumas
- Dayak blue flycatcher, Cyornis montanus
- Meratus blue flycatcher, Cyornis kadayangensis (E)
- Sunda blue flycatcher, Cyornis caerulatus
- Malaysian blue flycatcher, Cyornis turcosus
- Bornean blue flycatcher, Cyornis superbus
- Indochinese blue flycatcher, Cyornis sumatrensis
- Mangrove blue flycatcher, Cyornis rufigastra
- Sulawesi blue flycatcher, Cyornis omissus (E)
- Gray-chested jungle-flycatcher, Cyornis umbratilis
- Fulvous-chested jungle-flycatcher, Cyornis olivaceus
- Chestnut-tailed jungle-flycatcher, Cyornis ruficauda
- Banggai jungle flycatcher, Cyornis pelingensis (E)
- Sula jungle flycatcher, Cyornis colonus
- Large niltava, Niltava grandis
- Rufous-vented niltava, Niltava sumatrana
- Blue-and-white flycatcher, Cyanoptila cyanomelana
- Zappey's flycatcher, Cyanoptila cumatilis
- Flores jungle flycatcher, Eumyias oscillans (E)
- Sumba jungle flycatcher, Eumyias stresemanni (E)
- Indigo flycatcher, Eumyias indigo
- Verditer flycatcher, Eumyias thalassinus
- Buru jungle-flycatcher, Eumyias additus (E)
- Turquoise flycatcher, Eumyias panayensis
- Eyebrowed jungle-flycatcher, Vauriella gularis
- Great shortwing, Heinrichia calligyna (E)
- Lesser shortwing, Brachypteryx leucophrys
- Bornean shortwing, Brachypteryx erythrogyna
- Sumatran shortwing, Brachypteryx saturata (E)
- Javan shortwing, Brachypteryx montana (E)
- Flores shortwing, Brachypteryx floris (E)
- Siberian blue robin, Larvivora cyane
- Shiny whistling-thrush, Myophonus melanurus (E)
- Javan whistling-thrush, Myophonus glaucinus
- Sumatran whistling-thrush, Myophonus castaneus
- Bornean whistling-thrush, Myophonus borneensis
- Blue whistling-thrush, Myophonus caeruleus
- White-crowned forktail, Enicurus leschenaulti
- Bornean forktail, Enicurus borneensis
- Sunda forktail, Enicurus velatus (E)
- Chestnut-naped forktail, Enicurus ruficapillus
- Sunda robin, Myiomela diana (E)
- Red-flanked bluetail, Tarsiger cyanurus (A)
- Yellow-rumped flycatcher, Ficedula zanthopygia
- Narcissus flycatcher, Ficedula narcissina
- Mugimaki flycatcher, Ficedula mugimaki
- Snowy-browed flycatcher, Ficedula hyperythra
- Pygmy flycatcher, Ficedula hodgsoni
- Little pied flycatcher, Ficedula westermanni
- Taiga flycatcher, Ficedula albicilla (A)
- Tanimbar flycatcher, Ficedula riedeli (E)
- Rufous-chested flycatcher, Ficedula dumetoria
- Rufous-throated flycatcher, Ficedula rufigula (E)
- Damar flycatcher, Ficedula henrici (E)
- Cinnamon-chested flycatcher, Ficedula buruensis (E)
- Lompobattang flycatcher, Ficedula bonthaina (E)
- Sumba flycatcher, Ficedula harterti (E)
- Black-banded flycatcher, Ficedula timorensis (E)
- Blue rock-thrush, Monticola solitarius
- Siberian stonechat, Saxicola maurus
- Amur stonechat, Saxicola stejnegeri
- Pied bushchat, Saxicola caprata
- Timor bushchat, Saxicola gutturalis (E)

== Hylocitrea ==
Order: Passeriformes Family: Hylocitreidae

The hylocitrea (Hylocitrea bonensis), also known as the yellow-flanked whistler or olive-flanked whistler, is a species of bird that is endemic to montane forests on the Indonesian island of Sulawesi.

- Hylocitrea, Hylocitrea bonensis (E)

== Flowerpeckers ==
Order: Passeriformes Family: Dicaeidae

The flowerpeckers are very small, stout, often brightly coloured birds, with short tails, short thick curved bills, and tubular tongues.

- Yellow-breasted flowerpecker, Prionochilus maculatus
- Crimson-breasted flowerpecker, Prionochilus percussus
- Yellow-rumped flowerpecker, Prionochilus xanthopygius
- Scarlet-breasted flowerpecker, Prionochilus thoracicus
- Spectacled flowerpecker, Dicaeum dayakorum
- Golden-rumped flowerpecker, Dicaeum annae (E)
- Thick-billed flowerpecker, Dicaeum agile
- Brown-backed flowerpecker, Dicaeum everetti
- Yellow-vented flowerpecker, Dicaeum chrysorrheum
- Yellow-sided flowerpecker, Dicaeum aureolimbatum (E)
- Orange-bellied flowerpecker, Dicaeum trigonostigma
- Plain flowerpecker, Dicaeum minullum
- Crimson-crowned flowerpecker, Dicaeum nehrkorni (E)
- Halmahera flowerpecker, Dicaeum schistaceiceps (E)
- Buru flowerpecker, Dicaeum erythrothorax (E)
- Ashy flowerpecker, Dicaeum vulneratum (E)
- Olive-crowned flowerpecker, Dicaeum pectorale
- Red-capped flowerpecker, Dicaeum geelvinkianum
- Black-fronted flowerpecker, Dicaeum igniferum (E)
- Red-chested flowerpecker, Dicaeum maugei (E)
- Fire-breasted flowerpecker, Dicaeum ignipectus
- Black-sided flowerpecker, Dicaeum monticolum
- Gray-sided flowerpecker, Dicaeum celebicum (E)
- Blood-breasted flowerpecker, Dicaeum sanguinolentum (E)
- Mistletoebird, Dicaeum hirundinaceum
- Scarlet-backed flowerpecker, Dicaeum cruentatum
- Scarlet-headed flowerpecker, Dicaeum trochileum (E)

== Sunbirds and spiderhunters ==
Order: Passeriformes Family: Nectariniidae

The sunbirds and spiderhunters are very small passerine birds which feed largely on nectar, although they will also take insects, especially when feeding young. Their flight is fast and direct on short wings. Most species can take nectar by hovering like a hummingbird, but usually perch to feed.

- Ruby-cheeked sunbird, Chalcoparia singalensis
- Plain sunbird, Anthreptes simplex
- Brown-throated sunbird, Anthreptes malacensis
- Red-throated sunbird, Anthreptes rhodolaemus
- Van Hasselt's sunbird, Leptocoma brasiliana
- Purple-throated sunbird, Leptocoma sperata
- Black sunbird, Leptocoma aspasia
- Copper-throated sunbird, Leptocoma calcostetha
- Olive-backed sunbird, Cinnyris jugularis
- Apricot-breasted sunbird, Cinnyris buettikoferi (E)
- Flame-breasted sunbird, Cinnyris solaris (E)
- Elegant sunbird, Aethopyga duyvenbodei (E)
- Temminck's sunbird, Aethopyga temminckii
- Javan sunbird, Aethopyga mystacalis (E)
- Crimson sunbird, Aethopyga siparaja
- White-flanked sunbird, Aethopyga eximia (E)
- Purple-naped spiderhunter, Kurochkinegramma hypogrammicum
- Thick-billed spiderhunter, Arachnothera crassirostris
- Long-billed spiderhunter, Arachnothera robusta
- Little spiderhunter, Arachnothera longirostra
- Whitehead's spiderhunter, Arachnothera juliae
- Yellow-eared spiderhunter, Arachnothera chrysogenys
- Spectacled spiderhunter, Arachnothera flavigaster
- Streaky-breasted spiderhunter, Arachnothera affinis
- Gray-breasted spiderhunter, Arachnothera modesta
- Bornean spiderhunter, Arachnothera everetti

== Fairy-bluebirds ==
Order: Passeriformes Family: Irenidae

The fairy-bluebirds are bulbul-like birds of open forest or thorn scrub. The males are dark-blue and the females a duller green.

- Asian fairy-bluebird, Irena puella

== Leafbirds ==
Order: Passeriformes Family: Chloropseidae

The leafbirds are small, bulbul-like birds. The males are brightly plumaged, usually in greens and yellows.

- Greater green leafbird, Chloropsis sonnerati
- Lesser green leafbird, Chloropsis cyanopogon
- Blue-winged leafbird, Chloropsis cochinchinensis
- Bornean leafbird, Chloropsis kinabaluensis (A)
- Sumatran leafbird, Chloropsis media (E)
- Blue-masked leafbird, Chloropsis venusta (E)

== Weavers and allies ==
Order: Passeriformes Family: Ploceidae

The weavers are small passerine birds related to the finches. They are seed-eating birds with rounded conical bills. The males of many species are brightly coloured, usually in red or yellow and black, but some species show variation in colour only in the breeding season.

- Streaked weaver, Ploceus manyar
- Baya weaver, Ploceus philippinus
- Asian golden weaver, Ploceus hypoxanthus

== Waxbills and allies ==
Order: Passeriformes Family: Estrildidae

The estrildid finches are small passerine birds of the Old World tropics and Australasia. They are gregarious and often colonial seed eaters with short thick but pointed bills. They are all similar in structure and habits, but have wide variation in plumage colours and patterns.

- Mountain firetail, Oreostruthus fuliginosus
- Crimson finch, Neochmia phaeton
- Zebra finch, Taeniopygia guttata
- Java sparrow, Padda oryzivora
- Timor sparrow, Padda fuscata
- Streak-headed munia, Mayrimunia tristissima
- White-spotted munia, Mayrimunia leucosticta
- Scaly-breasted munia, Lonchura punctulata
- Black-faced munia, Lonchura molucca (E)
- White-rumped munia, Lonchura striata
- Dusky munia, Lonchura fuscans
- White-bellied munia, Lonchura leucogastra
- Javan munia, Lonchura leucogastroides (E)
- Chestnut munia, Lonchura atricapilla
- White-capped munia, Lonchura ferruginosa (E)
- White-headed munia, Lonchura maja
- Pale-headed munia, Lonchura pallida (E)
- Grand munia, Lonchura grandis
- Black-breasted munia, Lonchura teerinki (E)
- Snow Mountain munia, Lonchura montana
- Gray-banded munia, Lonchura vana (E)
- Gray-crowned munia, Lonchura nevermanni
- Hooded munia, Lonchura spectabilis
- Five-colored munia, Lonchura quinticolor (E)
- Chestnut-breasted munia, Lonchura castaneothorax
- Black munia, Lonchura stygia
- Pin-tailed parrotfinch, Erythrura prasina
- Tawny-breasted parrotfinch, Erythrura hyperythra
- Tricolored parrotfinch, Erythrura tricolor (E)
- Papuan parrotfinch, Erythrura papuana
- Blue-faced parrotfinch, Erythrura trichroa
- Red avadavat, Amandava amandava

== Old World sparrows ==
Order: Passeriformes Family: Passeridae

Sparrows are small passerine birds, typically small, plump, brown or grey with short tails and short powerful beaks. They are seed-eaters, but also consume small insects.

- House sparrow, Passer domesticus (I)
- Eurasian tree sparrow, Passer montanus

== Wagtails and pipits ==
Order: Passeriformes Family: Motacillidae

Motacillidae is a family of small passerine birds with medium to long tails and comprises the wagtails, longclaws, and pipits. These are slender ground-feeding insectivores of open country.

- Forest wagtail, Dendronanthus indicus
- Gray wagtail, Motacilla cinerea
- Western yellow wagtail, Motacilla flava
- Eastern yellow wagtail, Motacilla tschutschensis
- White wagtail, Motacilla alba (A)
- Madanga, Madanga ruficollis (E)
- Richard's pipit, Anthus richardi (A)
- Paddyfield pipit, Anthus rufulus
- Alpine pipit, Anthus gutturalis
- Pechora pipit, Anthus gustavi -
- Red-throated pipit, Anthus cervinus

== Finches, euphonias, and allies ==
Order: Passeriformes Family: Fringillidae

Finches are small to moderately large seed-eating passerine birds with a strong beak, usually conical and in some species very large. All have 12 tail feathers and nine primary flight feathers. Finches have a bouncing flight, alternating bouts of flapping with gliding on closed wings, and most sing well.

- Mountain serin, Chrysocorythus estherae

== Old World buntings ==
Order: Passeriformes Family: Emberizidae

The emberizids are a large family of seed-eating birds with distinctively shaped bills. Many emberizid species have distinctive head patterns.

- Black-headed bunting, Emberiza melanocephala (A)
- Black-faced bunting, Emberiza spodocephala (A)

== See also ==
- Fauna of Indonesia
- Fauna of New Guinea
- Lists of birds by region

== Bibliography ==
- BirdLife International, The World List of Threatened Birds, ISBN 1-56098-528-3
- BirdLife International, Endemic Bird Areas of the World, ISBN 1-56098-574-7
- Morten Strange, A Photographic Guide to the Birds of Indonesia, ISBN 0-691-11495-1
- Periplus Ac+ion Guides, Birding Indonesia, ISBN 962-593-071-X
- The Howard and Moore, Complete Checklist of the Birds of the World, ISBN 0-691-11701-2
