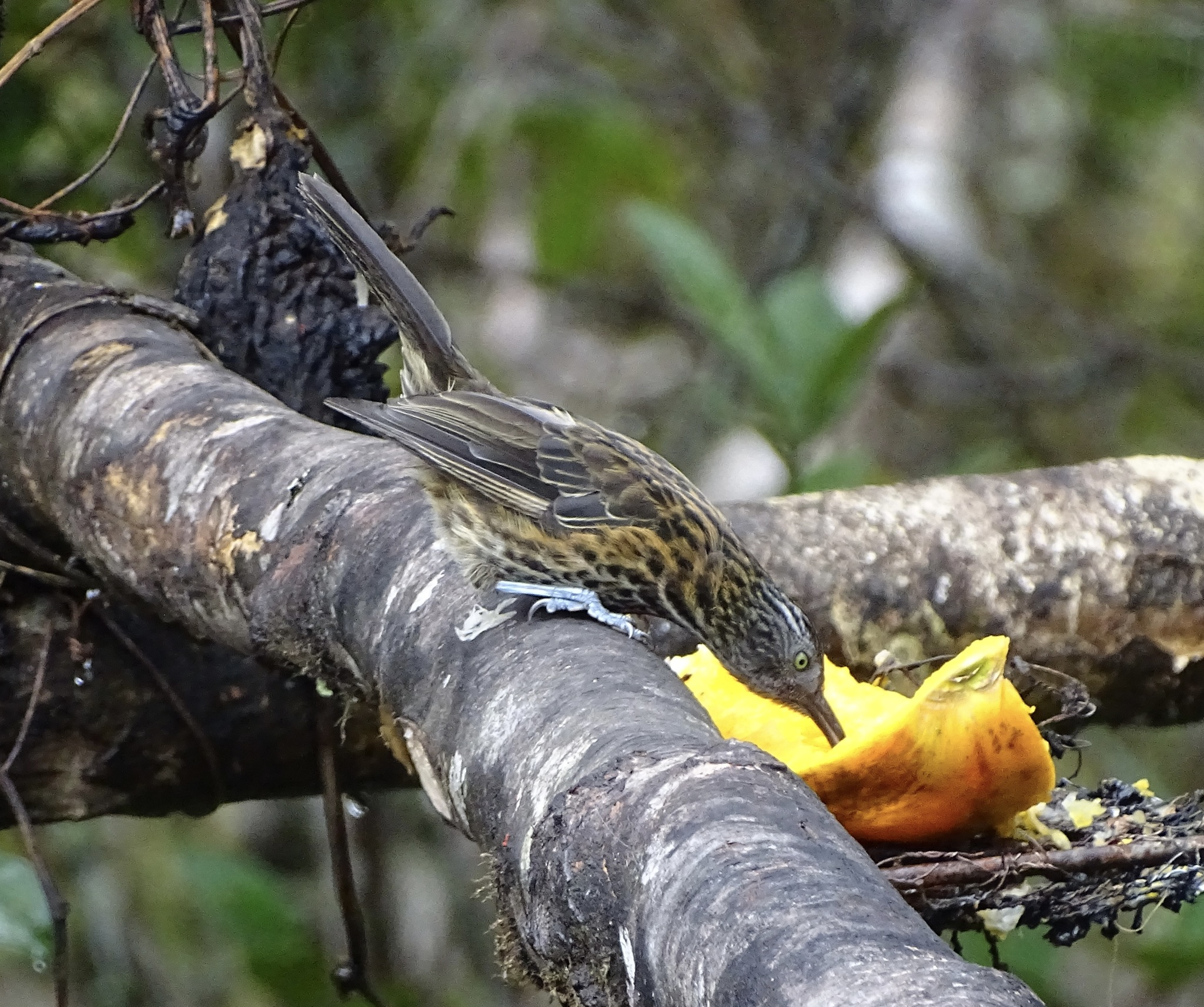

Conservation status
- Least Concern (IUCN 3.1)

Scientific classification
- Kingdom: Animalia
- Phylum: Chordata
- Class: Aves
- Order: Passeriformes
- Family: Meliphagidae
- Genus: Ptiloprora
- Species: P. guisei

Binomial name
- Ptiloprora guisei (De Vis, 1894)

= Rufous-backed honeyeater =

Species of bird

The rufous-backed honeyeater (Ptiloprora guisei) is a species of bird in the family Meliphagidae. It is endemic to Papua New Guinea.

Its natural habitat is subtropical or tropical moist montane forests.
