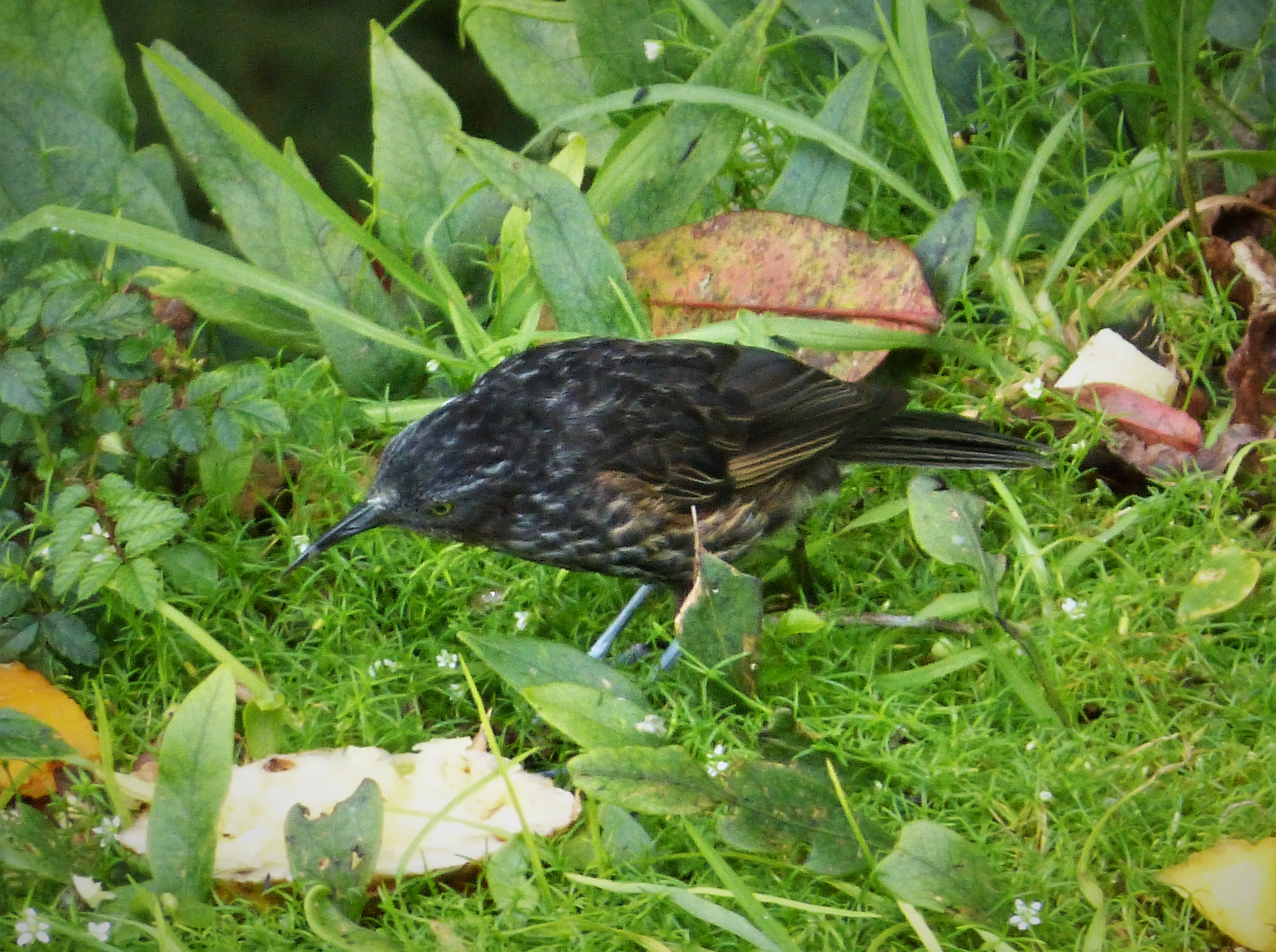

Scientific classification
- Kingdom: Animalia
- Phylum: Chordata
- Class: Aves
- Order: Passeriformes
- Family: Meliphagidae
- Genus: Ptiloprora; De Vis, 1894

Type species
- Ptilotis guisei De Vis, 1894

= Ptiloprora =

Genus of birds

Ptiloprora is a genus of birds in the honeyeater family Meliphagidae that are endemic to New Guinea.

The genus contains six species:

| Image | Name | Common name |
|---|---|---|
| | Ptiloprora plumbea | Leaden honeyeater |
| | Ptiloprora meekiana | Yellowish-streaked honeyeater |
| | Ptiloprora erythropleura | Rufous-sided honeyeater |
| | Ptiloprora guisei | Rufous-backed honeyeater |
| | Ptiloprora mayri | Mayr's honeyeater |
| | Ptiloprora perstriata | Grey-streaked honeyeater |
