= Mayr's honeyeater =

Conservation status
- Least Concern (IUCN 3.1)

Scientific classification
- Kingdom: Animalia
- Phylum: Chordata
- Class: Aves
- Order: Passeriformes
- Family: Meliphagidae
- Genus: Ptiloprora
- Species: P. mayri

Binomial name
- Ptiloprora mayri Hartert, 1930

Species of bird

Mayr's honeyeater (Ptiloprora mayri) is a species of bird in the family Meliphagidae. It is found in New Guinea. Its natural habitat is subtropical or tropical moist montane forests. There were no confirmed sightings between 2008 and 2023 until a scientific expedition to the Cyclops Mountains in New Guinea captured images of a pair of the birds in June and July of that year.
