= Leaden honeyeater =

Conservation status
- Least Concern (IUCN 3.1)

Scientific classification
- Kingdom: Animalia
- Phylum: Chordata
- Class: Aves
- Order: Passeriformes
- Family: Meliphagidae
- Genus: Ptiloprora
- Species: P. plumbea

Binomial name
- Ptiloprora plumbea (Salvadori, 1895)

Species of bird

The leaden honeyeater (Ptiloprora plumbea) is a species of bird in the family Meliphagidae. It is found in the New Guinea Highlands. Its natural habitat is subtropical or tropical moist montane forests.
