= Rufous-sided honeyeater =

Conservation status
- Least Concern (IUCN 3.1)

Scientific classification
- Kingdom: Animalia
- Phylum: Chordata
- Class: Aves
- Order: Passeriformes
- Family: Meliphagidae
- Genus: Ptiloprora
- Species: P. erythropleura

Binomial name
- Ptiloprora erythropleura (Salvadori, 1876)

Species of bird

The rufous-sided honeyeater (Ptiloprora erythropleura) is a species of bird in the family Meliphagidae. It is endemic to West Papua, Indonesia. There are currently 2 recognized subspecies.

Its natural habitat is subtropical or tropical moist montane forests.

== Description ==
Rufous-sided honeyeaters generally weigh from 18 to 25 grams. Their head and necks are a greyish color, while under the wings is a more chestnut-brown color. Not much is known about juvenile coloring.

== Diet and behavior ==
The birds are omnivorous, eating insects, nectar, and fruit. They will forage from all levels of vegetation, but mostly the middle and upper levels.

Often the birds are seen in pairs, or in small groups.

Their sound is made of rapid "plaintive whistled 'chwee' notes", although this varies by location.
