= Yellowish-streaked honeyeater =

Conservation status
- Least Concern (IUCN 3.1)

Scientific classification
- Kingdom: Animalia
- Phylum: Chordata
- Class: Aves
- Order: Passeriformes
- Family: Meliphagidae
- Genus: Ptiloprora
- Species: P. meekiana

Binomial name
- Ptiloprora meekiana (Rothschild & Hartert, 1907)

Species of bird

The yellowish-streaked honeyeater or olive-streaked honeyeater (Ptiloprora meekiana) is a species of bird in the family Meliphagidae. It is found in New Guinea. Its natural habitat is subtropical or tropical moist montane forests.
