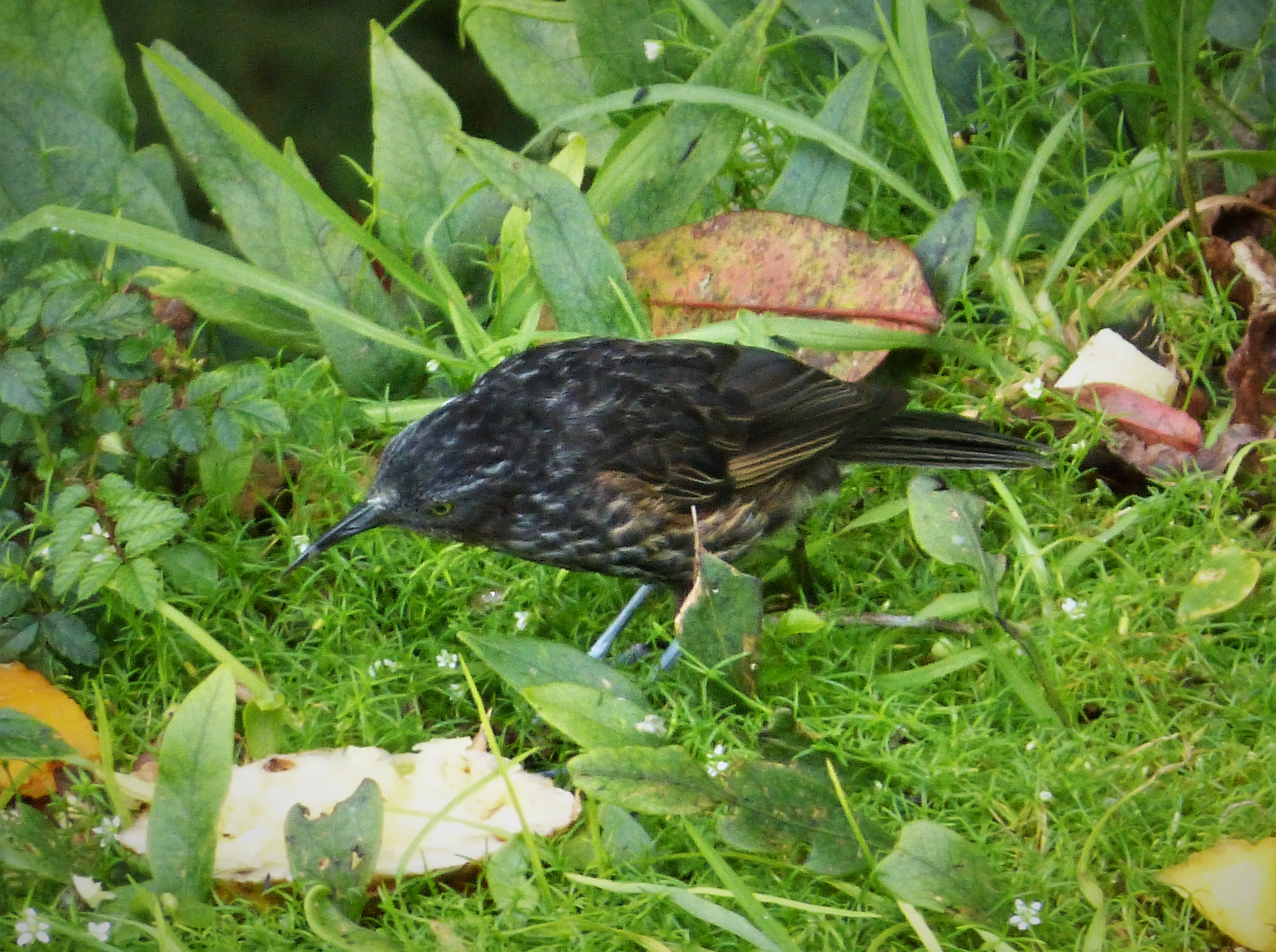

Conservation status
- Least Concern (IUCN 3.1)

Scientific classification
- Kingdom: Animalia
- Phylum: Chordata
- Class: Aves
- Order: Passeriformes
- Family: Meliphagidae
- Genus: Ptiloprora
- Species: P. perstriata

Binomial name
- Ptiloprora perstriata (De Vis, 1898)

= Grey-streaked honeyeater =

Species of bird

The grey-streaked honeyeater (Ptiloprora perstriata), also known as the black-backed honeyeater, is a species of bird in the family Meliphagidae. It is found in the New Guinea Highlands. Its natural habitat is subtropical or tropical moist montane forests.
