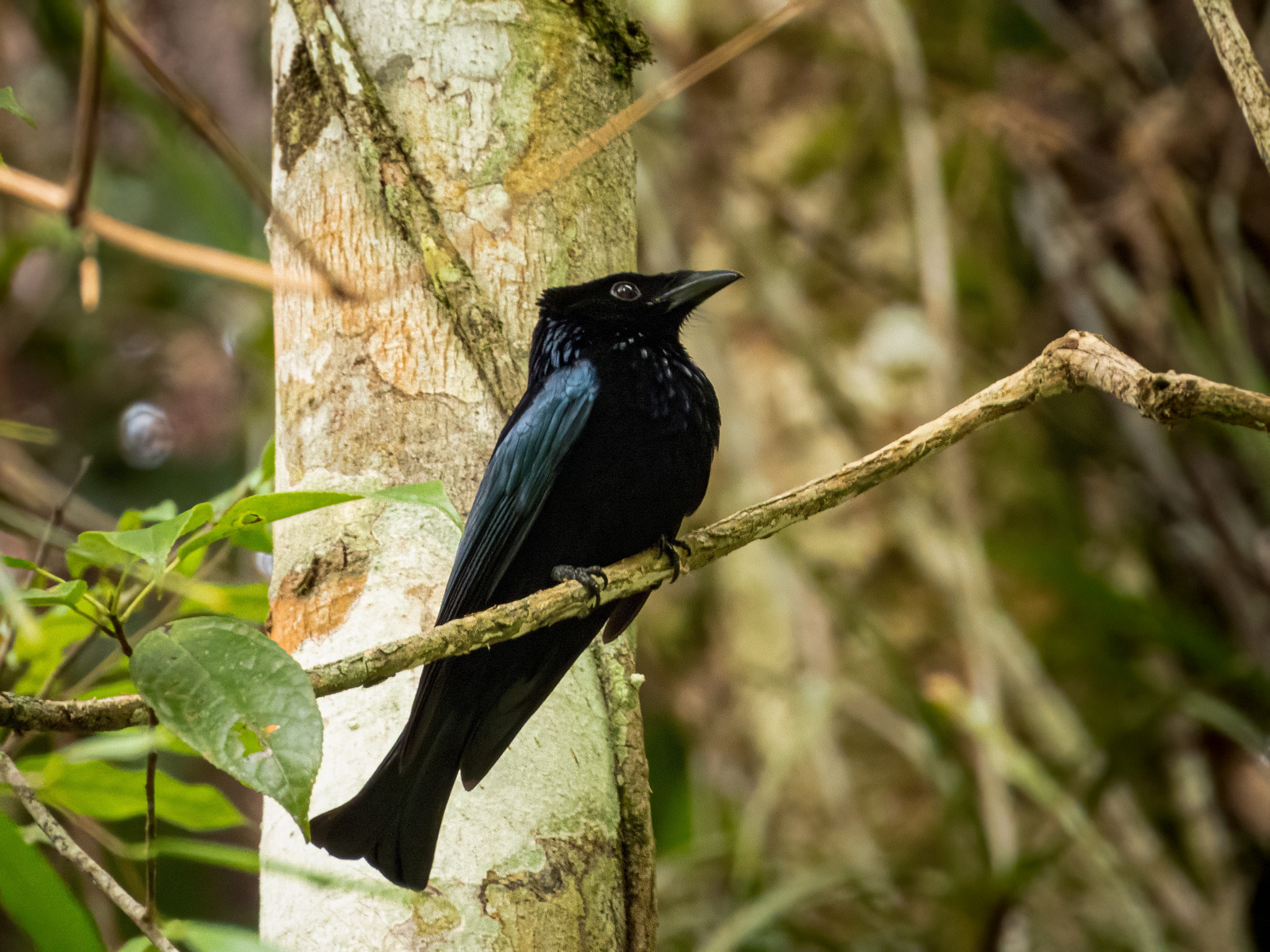

Conservation status
- Near Threatened (IUCN 3.1)

Scientific classification
- Kingdom: Animalia
- Phylum: Chordata
- Class: Aves
- Order: Passeriformes
- Family: Dicruridae
- Genus: Dicrurus
- Species: D. sumatranus

Binomial name
- Dicrurus sumatranus Wardlaw-Ramsay, RG, 1880

= Sumatran drongo =

Species of bird

The Sumatran drongo (Dicrurus sumatranus) is a passerine bird in the family Dicruridae. It was formerly considered conspecific with the hair-crested drongo. It is endemic to the island of Sumatra in Indonesia. Its natural habitat is subtropical or tropical moist lowland forests. It is threatened by habitat loss.
