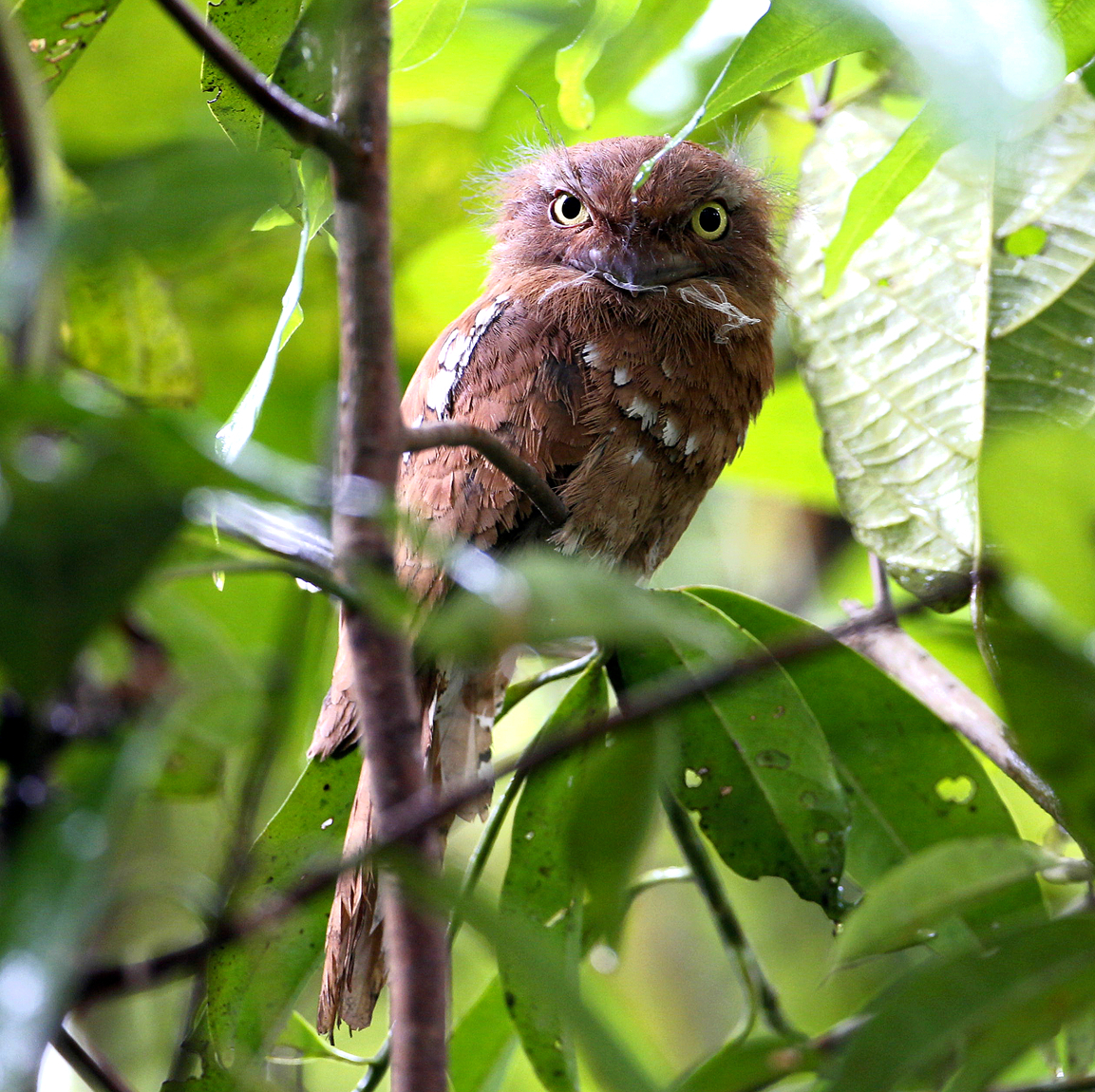

Conservation status
- Least Concern (IUCN 3.1)

Scientific classification
- Kingdom: Animalia
- Phylum: Chordata
- Class: Aves
- Clade: Strisores
- Order: Podargiformes
- Family: Podargidae
- Genus: Batrachostomus
- Species: B. affinis

Binomial name
- Batrachostomus affinis Blyth, 1847
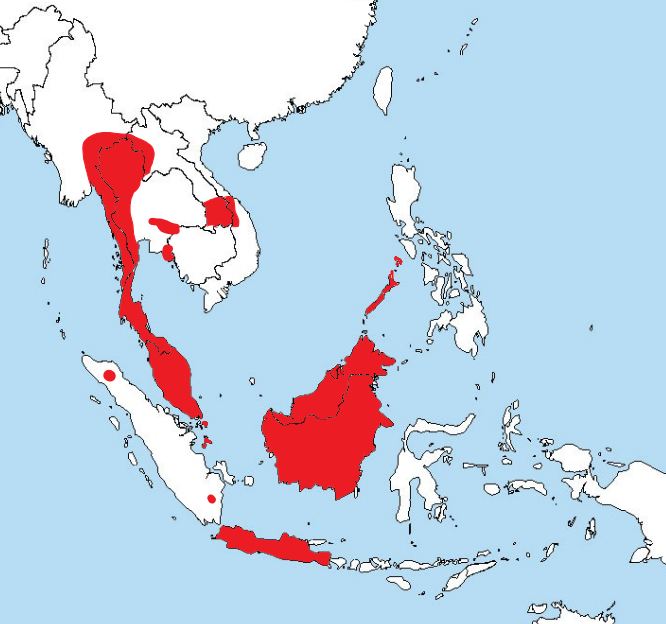
- Range of B. javensis

= Blyth's frogmouth =

Species of bird

Blyth’s frogmouth (Batrachostomus affinis) is a species of bird in the family Podargidae. They are brownish or rufescent brown with a slightly round bill and tail, and have tufts of bristles in front of the eyes and at the base of the bill. Batrachostomus occur from India and Sri Lanka, across mainland southeast Asia and as far as Borneo, Java, and Sumatra. More specifically, the Blyth’s frogmouths are scattered between southeastern Myanmar and Indonesia. Like other frogmouth species, they are insectivorous.

== Taxonomy and systematics ==
The English zoologist, curator of the Museum of the Asiatic Society of Bengal (Calcutta), and collector Edward Blyth (1810–1873) gave his name to B. affinis. “Frogmouth” simply refers to the frog-like large and extremely wide bills of the birds. In French, the word “podarge” in Podarge de Blyth was given by the naturalist Baron Cuvier, referencing the bird’s short legs and awkward appearance. The term is derived from the Greek word “podargos”, which means “gouty man”.

Blyth’s frogmouth is one of 17 species of frogmouths in the family Podargidae, which includes the three genera Podargus, Rigidipenna, and Batrachostomus. Blyth’s frogmouth is in the genus Batrachostomus, and is mostly found in Asia, while the larger Podargus species are in New Guinea and Australia and the single Rigidipenna species is found in Papua New Guinea and the Solomon Islands.

DNA-DNA hybridization data from 1988 suggested that species in Batrachostomus are distantly related to the Podargus ones and should therefore be placed in a new separate family, the Batrachostomidae. However, further research is still needed and the new taxonomic classification still does not appear to have been accepted. Confusion and contradicting information also exists about the order of Blyth’s frogmouth. All frogmouths were previously in the order Caprimulgiformes, but a 2019 study determined that Podargus and Batrachostomus diverged from one another between 30 and 50 million years ago, and were consequently forming their own clade separate from nightjars. They are also a sister taxon to the swifts, hummingbirds, and owlet-nightjars. Therefore, the order Podargiformes, first proposed in 1918 by Gregory Mathews, was reinstated and includes Blyth’s species.

Initially, Blyth’s frogmouth (B. affinis) and the Javan frogmouth (B. javensis) were thought to be the same species as the Sunda frogmouth (B. cornutus), but it was later concluded from a mix of recordings of vocalizations from field studies and museum specimens that B. cornutus is a distinct species from B. javensis and not a subspecies. All three were also sometimes considered as being the conspecifics of Hodgson’s frogmouth (B. hodgsoni), but size and structure differences of the bill, facial bristles, tail, bare-parts, and vocalizations were too great to approve this assumption. It was only recently that the Javan frogmouth (B. javensis) was split into three species: Javan (B. javensis), Blyth’s (B. affinis), and Palawan (B. chaseni). Blyth’s frogmouth, the best known and the most geographically widespread of these three, is further subdivided into two subspecies known as B. affinis affinis and B. affinis continentalis. Both subspecies are linked by an intermediate population in Khao I Phrom in central peninsular Thailand.

== Description ==
Blyth’s frogmouth is a small to medium species that measures between 20 and 23 centimeters in length. B. a. continentalis weighs about 46.0 grams. The birds are brownish or rufescent brown and lack white markings on wings and tail, however, the female is usually browner and more plain than males. The underparts are generally orange-brown or yellowish-brown with some whitish spots. The feathers of the shoulder region have fewer white oval shaped spots. They have a very thin white line around their neck that looks like a small collar. Males tend to have heavier black markings on their upper and underparts, and they are said to have a cryptic plumage. Like the other frogmouth species, Blyth’s has well developed stiff facial bristles and longer black or dark-coloured ones that cover the ears called “auricular plumes”. Their function is still unknown. Juveniles have a soft-textured plumage and differ from the adult males by their coloration that has more rufous tones, and their upperparts have more dark barring and no spot. Their underparts are similar to adult females, but are duller. They also have narrow black bars on many feathers of the throat and breast. Little information exists about molts, but observations of active wing molt in Peninsular Malaysia have been made in July, September, and October. Others have observed individuals that had not replaced their feathers by January–March and in November. The molting sequence is still largely unknown even though the pattern is often asymmetrical.

Blyth’s frogmouth has a tail length of 95-111 millimeters for males and 90-107 millimeters for females. Like other Batrachostomus species, the Blyth’s frogmouth has a large tail compared to its body size, which helps for maneuverability. The trailing edges of the flight and tail feathers allow it to fly silently when hunting.

Batrachostomus frogmouths have small jaws and short, wide, and rounded bills. The size of the bill seems adapted for taking prey in flight. Slit-looking nostrils can be found at its base and are protected by an operculum, which is a lid-like structure that can open and close to protect the nares. Frogmouths have short and weak feet with unequal toes (i.e., one toe backward and the other three forward). Side toes have the ability to splay out at a 90 degrees angle, which provides the birds with a better grip. The legs and feet are either brown, pink-brown, slightly pink, or more white. The Blyth’s frogmouth has pale yellow or lemon-yellow irises.

=== Similar species ===
Small frogmouths are all physically similar, which makes it hard to differentiate the Blyth’s frogmouth from other species. Its vocalizations and the geographical distribution can help identify it.

- Gould’s frogmouth (B. stellatus): In some parts of Thailand, Blyth’s is the only frogmouth, but there might be some overlap between B. a. continentalis and the Gould’s frogmouth in the southern part of the country. In Peninsular Malaysia, both species overlap more extensively, but B. a. continentalis can be distinguished by its smaller bill. B. a. affinis wing feathers have less white spots than the Gould’s frogmouth and they also have very little overlap.
- Hodgson’s frogmouth (B. hodgsoni): Generally larger, darker, and more spotted than B. a. continentalis.
- Bornean frogmouth (B. mixtus): Less heavily spotted than B. a. affinis.
- Sumatran frogmouth (B. poliolophus): Underparts are more spotted than B. a. affinis.
- Sunda frogmouth (B. cornutus): Larger, darker, and more heavily marked underparts than B. a. affinis.

Blyth’s frogmouth, like other genera in the family, tends to look like owls (Strigidae), but differs from them by its lack of strong claws on the toes.

A study from 2015 also confirmed that the species Masillapodargus longpipes is a similar frogmouth in the order Podargiformes. New fossil evidence from the early Eocene German fossil site Messel confirmed its classification.

== Distribution and habitat ==
Batrachostomus, including Blyth’s frogmouth, are found from India and Sri Lanka to as far as Borneo, Java, and Sumatra. The arboreal species thrives in mature lowland evergreen forests. In Thailand, it tends to prefer forests and rainforests of extreme lowlands, but can also live in mixed deciduous forest at an elevation of 800 meters further north. Records of the Blyth’s frogmouth also exist in Peninsular Malaysia near swampy jungles and in lower storeys of forests in lowlands and hills. In Java, the bird species is often seen on plains and in mountains, between 0-1,600 meters of elevation. They always seem to be where there is dense forest undergrowth. They were also recorded in mangroves in southern Sumatra, as well as in Vietnam, and Cambodia. Blyth’s frogmouths usually perch 1.5-12.0 meters above the ground and research suggests that they might be sedentary.

Even though the Blyth’s frogmouth has a relatively wide range, the fossil record suggests that frogmouths were also previously found in western and central Europe. During the Eocene and Oligocene (30-40 million years ago), those regions in Europe had subtropical forests that would have been appropriate for frogmouths. They probably went extinct in Europe when climatic changes in the Early Pleistocene caused the last of the subtropical forests to disappear.

== Behaviour and ecology ==
=== Breeding ===
Although detailed breeding information for Blyth's frogmouth is limited, family and genus-level observations can still offer valuable insights into their behaviour and ecology.

Batrachostomus species usually breed in forests and build their nests in the open on small branches. Their territory, usually occupied by a single pair, can cover up to 80 hectares. They usually build small nests made of bark, cobwebs, hair, moss, lichen, and other plant matter. The cup-shaped nests are extremely small and shallow, with observations of five Batrachostomus species suggesting they can hold only a single-egg. There have been reports of two-egg clutches for the Javan frogmouth (B. javensis), but they still need to be confirmed. Some suggest that the egg only stays in place in the nest from the constant presence of an incubating bird, which adopts a half-upright posture.

Batrachostomus frogmouths, including Blyth’s, exhibit sexual dimorphism. Drabber males are the incubating parent and do so during the day, while the brighter females take care of their territory during the night. Little information exists about their incubation and parental roles, but females of some Batrachostomus species are suspected to also incubate at night.

=== Vocalization ===
Vocalizations seem to be mainly after dark, before dawn, and at sunrise, which reflects the nocturnal nature of the Blyth’s frogmouth. Territorial songs are mostly during the early evening and dawn, while calls are during the night. Territorial songs are apparently similar in B. a. affinis and B. a. continentalis, and are given by females. Those songs are a descending series of 3-5 units and sound like gwaa-gwaa-gwaa-gwaa or a maniacal laughter. Some variations exist. Males and females produce short, varied calls, with transitional sounds when shifting from one call to another. B. a. affinis (in Thailand and Sumatra) and B. a. continentalis males can give plaintive whistles that are low pitched in the middle. B. a. affinis males can also do long rapid series of quit and single gwaa that are described as “barks” or “quiet frog-like croaks”. Overall, the vocalizations of the Blyth’s frogmouth are wheezy and asthmatic-like. They start explosive and loud and gradually fade.

=== Diet ===
The Blyth’s frogmouth is insectivorous. The stomach content of 20 specimens from Java included beetles, grasshoppers, earwigs, caterpillars, moths, cockroaches, termites, ants, cicadas, crickets, a yellow butterfly, and a gastropod mollusc with a flat shell. More information is required on the subject.

Frogmouths usually feed by sallying (i.e., fly or leap out from a branch) to the ground or by collecting insects directly from tree trunks and leafy branches. They can also catch insects, like moths, directly in flight.

== Status and conservation ==
Currently, the Blyth’s frogmouth (B. affinis) is listed under B. javensis on the IUCN Red List and is assessed as a least-concern species. It was previously considered near-threatened in 1994, but that was mostly due to the confusion around its taxonomy. In Borneo, Cambodia, Thailand, and Vietnam, the Blyth’s frogmouth is mostly uncommon. In Peninsular Malaysia, it is more or less common, and in central Malaysia it is at least as common as the Gould’s frogmouth (B. stellatus) in similar habitats. However, the species is still data deficient, so it might be under-recorded and its distribution might be incomplete. The main threat to the Blyth’s frogmouth is deforestation, since it exclusively lives in rainforest habitat.
