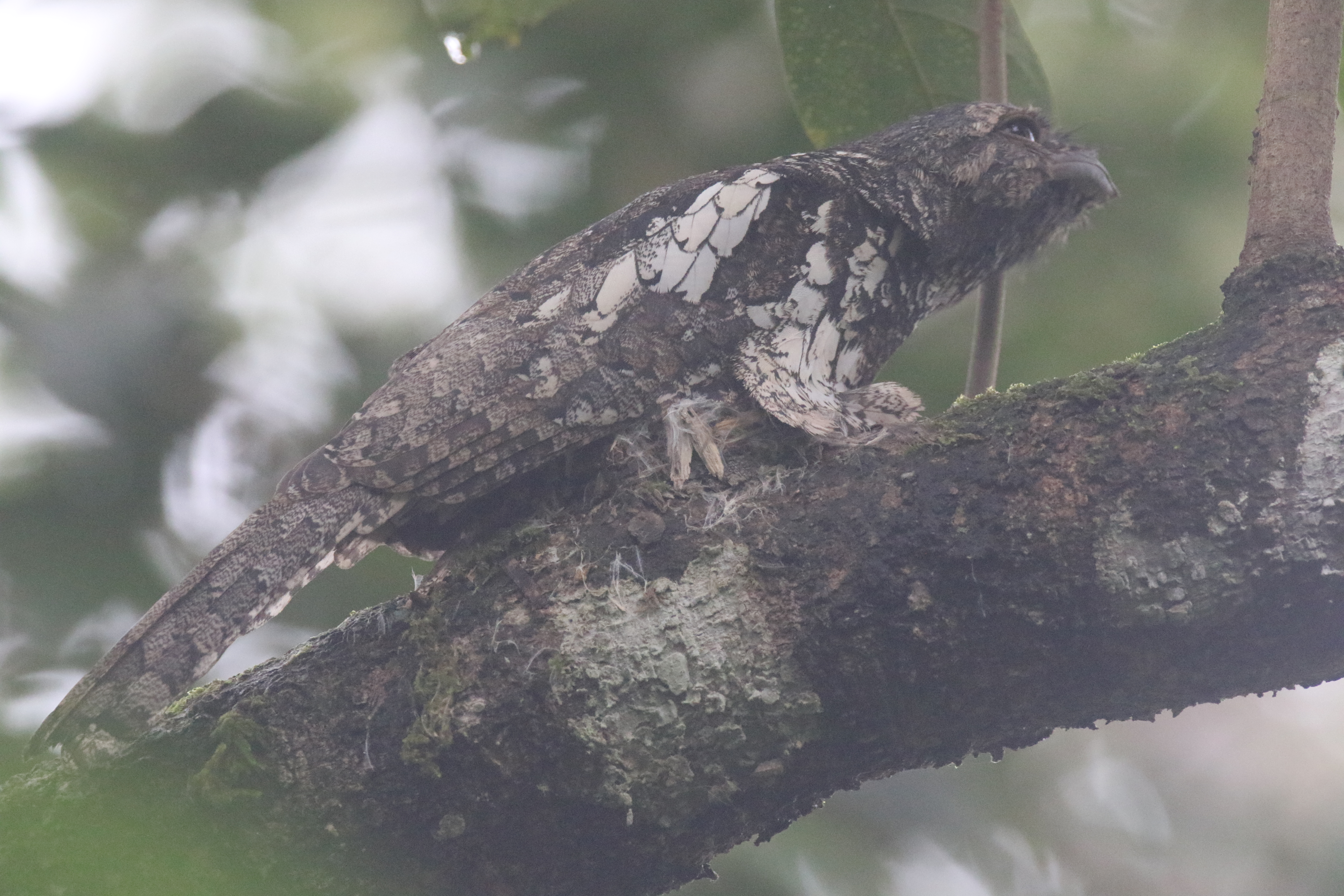

Conservation status
- Least Concern (IUCN 3.1)

Scientific classification
- Kingdom: Animalia
- Phylum: Chordata
- Class: Aves
- Order: Podargiformes
- Family: Podargidae
- Genus: Batrachostomus
- Species: B. cornutus

Binomial name
- Batrachostomus cornutus (Temminck, 1822)

= Sunda frogmouth =

Species of bird

The Sunda frogmouth (Batrachostomus cornutus) is a medium-sized, old world species of bird within the order Podargiformes. It is also uncommonly referred to as the long-tailed frogmouth or the horned frogmouth. The term "Sunda" is based on the geographical range of the species to regions around the Sunda islands. The genus name, Batrachostomus, is a Greek translation to 'frogmouth', which comes from the wide shape of the bill and slight gape. The species name cornutus is a Latin word translated to "having horns", referring to the tufts of feathers on the head.

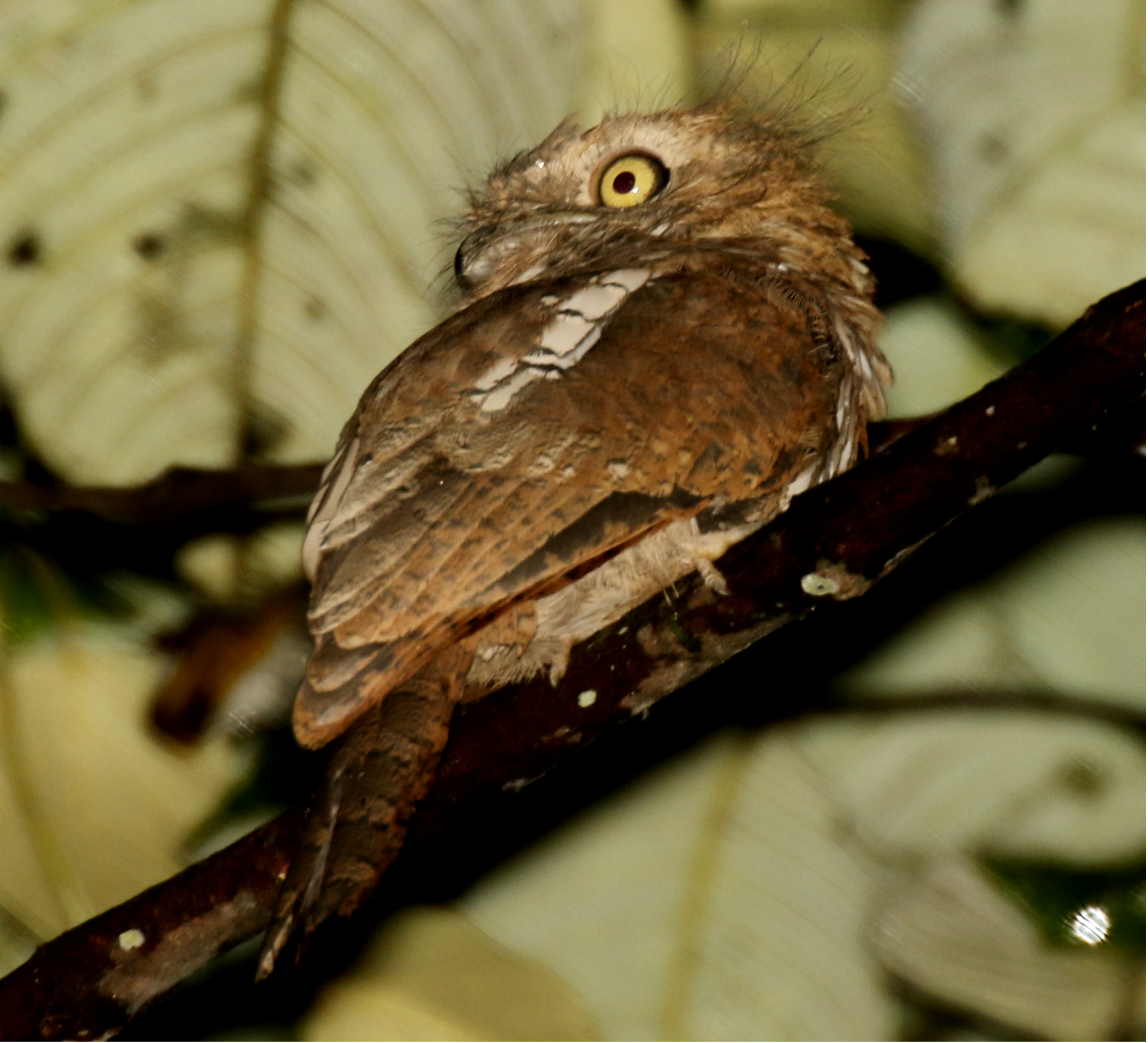
Borneo Rainforest Lodge - Sabah, Borneo - Malaysia

== Taxonomy ==
The Sunda frogmouth is found within the clade Strisores, which refers to nightbirds. It was previously grouped with order Caprimulgiformes which has a long history of classifications under different taxa. Hartert in 1892 classified Caprimulgiformes with Picariae which at the time included hoopoes, hummingbirds and swifts. Frogmouths were then classified with Coraciiformes by Gadow in 1892 and Sharpe in 1900 which included owls, swifts, hummingbirds, trogons, and rolers. The most recent classification of Caprimulgiformes were within Strigiformes (owls) by Sibley and Ahlquist in 1990. In the early 2000s, Caprimulgiformes were separated from Strigiformes due to advancements in DNA sequencing. The phylogenetic analysis using N-acetyltransferase gene supported the idea that adaptations to nocturnal activity is a result of convergent evolution. As of 2020, frogmouths are found within the order Podargiformes. This was first suggested by Gregory Mathews in 1918. The recent reasoning was that Podargidae diverged between long before other Caprimulgiformes, forming their own clade separate from the nightjars and oilbirds.

The family Podargidae contains 17 species of frogmouth under three genuses: Batrachostomus, Podargus and Rigidipenna. The genus Batrachostomus includes 10 species of frogmouths. It has been questioned whether it should be its own family due to mitochondrial genomics of Podargidae. There is a closer sister-taxa relationship between the Australia and New Guinea species of frogmouth from the Podargus family, than the Asian frogmouths (Bratrachostomus) due to the Oligocene divergence of Batrachostomus across Wallace's Line.

The Sunda frogmouth was first described by Temminck in 1822 in Recueil d'Oiseaux under B. javenensis. The Sunda frogmouth was originally a subspecies of the Javan frogmouth, as were many other Batrachostomus. In 1978, combined field studies of vocalizations and museum specimens were able to separate B. cornutus and label it as its own species.

The two subspecies of Batrachostomus cornutus, Batrachostomus cornutus cornutus and Batrachostomus cornutus longicaudatus, were originally identified as such due to geographical range. B. c. cornutus was the specimen identified by Temminck in 1822, and B. c. longicaudatus was identified by Hoogerwerf in 1962. In 2021, Eaton et al. speculated that B.c. longicaudatus is more closely related to B. javenensis, due to proximity in geographical location and lack of vocalization data, at the time. In June 2023, two B.c. longicaudatus were recorded on the Kangean islands finding them undifferentiated from the Sunda frogmouth, and therefore different from the Javan frogmouth.

== Description ==
=== Head and body ===
Batrachostomus cornutus is a medium-sized bird, with an average size of 25 to 28 cm. It is thought to have owl-like characteristics, due to its stocky body and stubby legs. The stocky look of this bird is because of its reduced leg length is due to small and weak tarsi. Frogmouths typically have anisodactylus feet, with the hallux behind and 3 toes in the front. When gripping a tree branch, the Sunda frogmouth can splay the side toes to be semizygodactylus.

A characterizing feature of the Sunda frogmouth are the well-developed, stiff facial bristles. The semi-bristles are dark and slender, and make tufts around the ear as 'auricular plumes'. Rictal bristles are present around the gape. Although the function of the bristles is unknown, the best hypothesis is that they serve a tactile function for feeding, whether it be feeding young in the dark or scooping insects.

The frogmouth gets its name from its wide and arched bill. The upper mandbile is dark whereas the lower mandible is more yellow. The rounded bill is thought to be used to catch prey in flight. The slit like nostrils are found at the base of the bill and are protected by an operculum surrounded by rictal bristles. The palate is covered with a hard keratinized layer of epidermis known as the rhamphotheca. Frogmouths have a desmognathous palate, meaning the maxillopalatine bones are fused.

Frogmouths as well as other nocturnal birds have large eyes with poor colour recognition since the eye has more rods and less cones. The size of the eyes help capture more light, as some is still required for hunting. Frogmouths have similar visual adaptations to owls, where they have a well developed wulst, the region associated with visual and sensory processing. However, frogmouths may have better diurnal vision than owls due to oil droplets found in the cone cells that allow the eye to focus on light by adding an additional spectral filter.

=== Coloration ===
The Sunda frogmouth is a mostly brown bird. The concealing coloration blends the frogmouth with its environment and the tree branches where it roosts. There are two main colour morphs; black and white, and brown and buff. Both morphs follow the same pattern. The brown and buff morph is characterized by a more reddish/brown coloration with lighter brown and yellow speckling and streaking. The upper parts and wing coverts, as well as the underparts are mostly brown with speckles of yellow, white and black. They become paler and streaked with brown on the belly and flanks. The scapulars are marked with white ovals. They have a white collar around the back of the neck and broad white supercilium. There are no white marks on the wings and tail. The reddish brown coloration of the brown and buff morph is a darker, almost black colour in the black and white morph. The yellow and lighter brown speckles and streaks are white. Individual coloration will vary based on the amount of speckling. A black and white morph could appear brown and buff due to the amount of speckling.

The females are brighter and plainer than the males with a more buff coloration and smaller white spots on the scapulars. The underparts of the female are less speckled. The immature Sunda frogmouth looks similar to the adult, but has a paler, more red coloration with less streaking. The B. c. cornutus subspecies is bolder than the B. c. longicaudatus. B. c. longicaudatus has less contrasting plumage with less white, and a longer tail, and narrower bill.

=== Plumage ===
The young Sunda frogmouth is covered in down. There are two successive downy plumages, which characterizes more primitive birds. The first down is much shorter than the second down. The second down occurs on the 7th day and the juvenile plumage comes in around 3 to 4 weeks. This plumage is a softer and looser texture with more pointed primary feathers. Within a few weeks of fledging, the first adult plumage comes in. The frogmouth has one moult per year. The Sunda frogmouth has a round tail with a centrifugal moult, meaning it moults from the inside out. The wings are characterized by a serial descendant moult, where the moult has many centers commencing at the same time proceeding in the same direction.

=== Similar species ===
The Sunda frogmouth is similar to the Javan frogmouth, the Sumatran frogmouth, the Bornean frogmouth, and the Blyth's frogmouth.

- Javan frogmouth: smaller, males are less distinctly brown or black below
- Sumatran frogmouth: smaller, more heavily spotted white underparts, males are more red and pale
- Bornean frogmouth: smaller, males are paler, females have less white spotted underparts
- Blyth's frogmouth: more white plumage

== Habitat and distribution ==
The Sunda frogmouth is found from southwestern India and Sri Lanka through South-East Asia to Philippines, Borneo, Sumatra and Java. B. c. cornutus is found in Sumatra, the Indonesian islands Bangka and Belitung, as well as Banggi island and Borneo. B.c. longicaudatus is restricted to the Kangean islands. Its natural habitats are subtropical or tropical moist lowland forest, subtropical or tropical mangrove forest, and subtropical or tropical moist montane forest. Unlike other frogmouths, B. cornutus prefers secondary growth forests, as well as the edges of lowland forests. Frogmouths are arboreal and are found in trees and sometimes bushes, as is the case of many populations in Sumatra which have been found roosting in shrubs along rivers.

== Behavior ==
=== Nocturnal ===
The Sunda frogmouth, like other birds in the clade Strisores, are nocturnal. Frogmouths feed on insects, which are most active at night. It will hunt in the crepuscular hours where there is faint light to see the prey. During the day, frogmouths roost on low branches in denser forest to avoid predators.

=== Hunting and diet ===
As mentioned, frogmouths feed on insects. To hunt, it will search the area beneath the branch for prey, often using its hearing. When spotted, it will fly from perch to perch to catch insects in the air. This is also referred to as sallying or hawking. A frogmouth will catch more prey in one flight in fields, than in woodlands. To hunt quietly, frogmouths have larger tails in relation to their body size. As well, the trailing edge of the tail feathers are frayed. Different frogmouth species can cohabitate in the same ecosystem, such as the Bornean lowland forest, due to a difference in body size, and therefore prey size. Since Podargidae do not use their claws like owls, prey size depends on what they can carry in their bill.

=== Breeding ===
The Sunda frogmouth differs from species in the genus Podargus because of its small, tiny nests made from down, bark, cobwebs, moss, and lichen. The nest is only about 7 by 6 cm with a 1 cm depression to hold the egg. The adult frogmouth will hide the nest while incubating the egg. Females will incubate the nest at night, and males will incubate the nest during the day. The nest is formed on trees, saplings and shrubs, with a tendency to favour rotting wood with peeling bark. There is usually only one whitish, elliptical egg per nest. There is usually a single clutch and brood every year, however if the clutch is lost early on, the frogmouth will lay a replacement one. The suspected breeding seasons vary with different populations of Sunda frogmouths with the constant remaining that spring and summer re for growth as that is when insects are largest. The Sumatra populations are suspected to breed in May–July, the Belitung populations in April–June and the Borneo populations in January–April. To protect the chicks, adults may pick up the young and fly away with them between their legs. As well, they will assume an alarm posture: closed eyes, neck and head stretched upwards, feathers compressed into body, motionless. If this fails, frogmouths will perform a defence display by spreading its wings and tail, fluffing its plumage whilst making a circular motion with its head and hissing. In rare cases, the frogmouth will perform a distraction display by flapping a stretched out wing to mimic an injury.

=== Other behaviors ===
==== Vocalizations ====
The analysis of sonograms is the best way to identify frogmouth species. The calls make a "gwaa" noise. The females will make the main territorial call. The other main vocalization from frogmouths is hissing during defence behavior.

==== Heat regulation ====
The main method of heat regulation from frogmouths is panting, rather than gular fluttering. The mouth is opened, the throat area is lowered, the wings are slightly spread, and the body feathers are compressed. This has been most studied in the tawny frogmouth, but is thought to occur in all frogmouth species.

==== Waterproofing ====
Frogmouths will take fat from powderdowns and distribute it amongst feathers to increase their waterproofing ability. The Sunda frogmouth has two large powderdowns on each side of its rump with 50 short plumose feathers that continuously exude fat.

== Conservation ==
The Sunda frogmouth population does not appear to be declining. A study on the birds of Kangean Island in 2024 noted the presence of B.c. longicaudatus in a selectively logged site in 2023, where the habitat is characterized by a dense understory and minimal large trees. As well, the mangroves that cover the perimeter of the Kangean islands are resistant to human exploitation and seem to host a significant amount of B.c. longicaudatus. The Sunda frogmouth is listed as least concern as per the IUCN red list.
