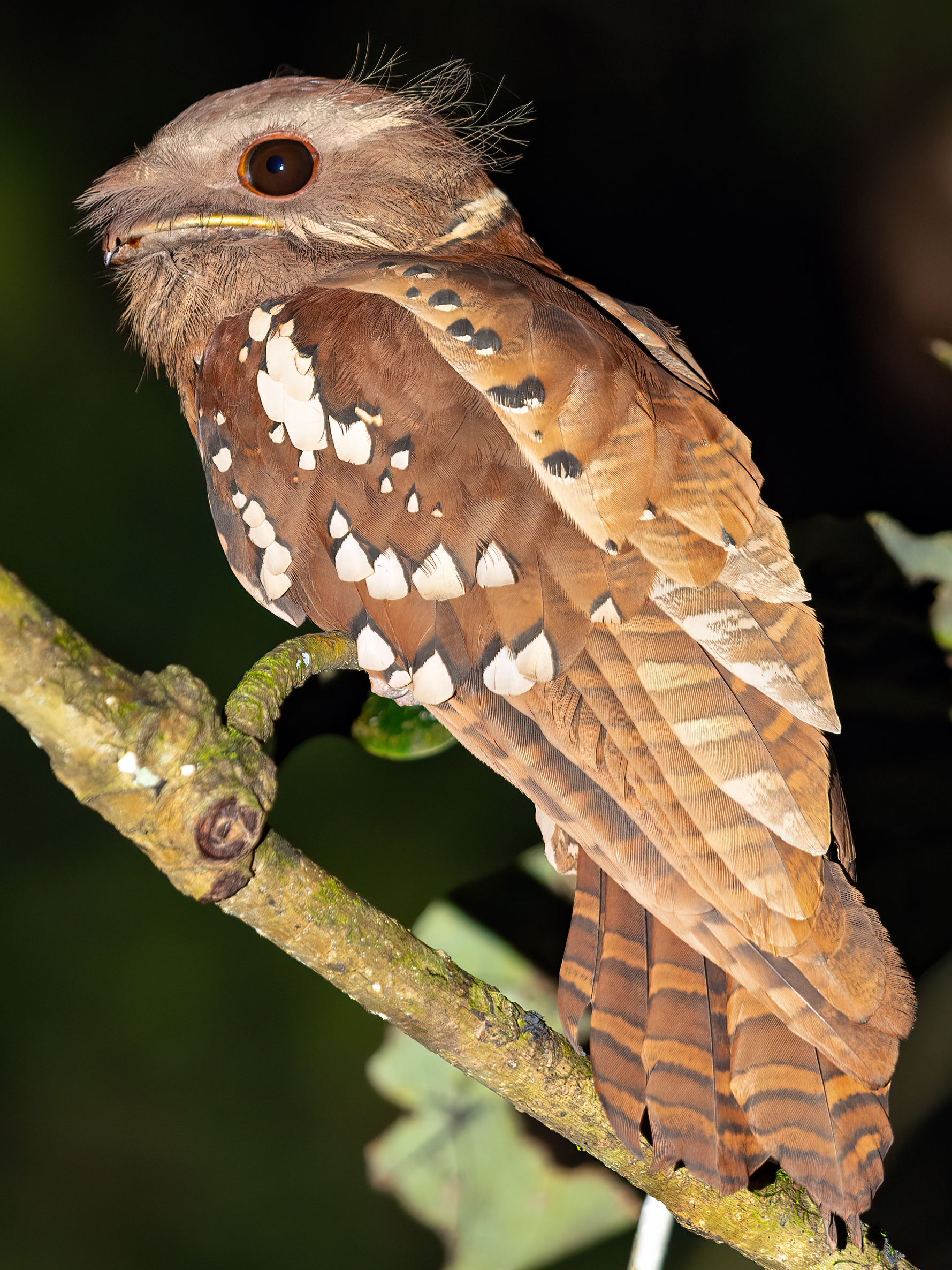

Conservation status
- Least Concern (IUCN 3.1)

Scientific classification
- Kingdom: Animalia
- Phylum: Chordata
- Class: Aves
- Clade: Strisores
- Order: Podargiformes
- Family: Podargidae
- Genus: Batrachostomus
- Species: B. harterti

Binomial name
- Batrachostomus harterti Sharpe, 1892

= Dulit frogmouth =

Species of bird

The Dulit frogmouth (Batrachostomus harterti) is a little-known species of bird in the frogmouth family, Podargidae, with a patchily recorded distribution in the Borneo montane rain forests to which it is endemic. The species is monotypic.

== History and etymology ==
The type specimen was collected by Charles Hose in 1891 on Mount Dulit in northern Sarawak, at an elevation of about 600 m, with the bird being taken "in a small jungle hut into which it had flown in the dusk evidently attracted by the light". The common name reflects the type locality, while the specific epithet honours German ornithologist Ernst Hartert.

== Description ==
It is a large, dark, chestnut-brown frogmouth, ranging in length from 32 to 37 cm. The wing length is 220 to 250 mm. It has buffish barring on the crown and a narrow buffish collar on the hindneck. The wing-coverts have large white spots. The underparts are paler brown with buff bars and spots. The sexes are similar.

The only other frogmouth of comparable size in Borneo is the large frogmouth (B. auritus), with which the Dulit frogmouth forms a superspecies. The large frogmouth is slightly larger (with a length of 39 – 42 cm) and paler; the crown is spotted and vermiculated rather than barred, the wing-coverts more heavily spotted, and the underparts plainer. No other frogmouth found in Borneo is more than 30 cm in length.

=== Voice ===
The call is not known for certain, though Tom Harrisson recorded a call in the Kelabit Highlands, which he attributed to this species, as "tuab tuab". The Kelabit name for the frogmouth is Tu'ub or Suit tu'ub.

== Distribution and habitat ==
The frogmouth is endemic to Borneo. Only eight museum specimens are known, taken from Mount Dulit, the Usun Apau Plateau and the Kelabit Highlands in Sarawak, and from Mount Liang Kubung in West Kalimantan. It has also been seen near Poring in the Kinabalu National Park in Sabah.

Its preferred habitat is lower montane forest of both primary and secondary growth, at an elevation of 300 to 1500 m above sea level. At Mount Dulit it replaces the more widespread large frogmouth altitudinally, the latter being found at lower levels.

== Behaviour ==
Very little is known of this frogmouth's breeding or feeding habits. A female specimen taken on 19 November was ready to lay eggs. The stomach of a specimen taken in the Kelabit Highlands was full of locusts or grasshoppers.

== Status and conservation ==
The range of the Dulit frogmouth is estimated at 127,000 km^{2} and decreasing. It is restricted to the Bornean Mountains Endemic Bird Area and is threatened by habitat loss through logging and agricultural development. Its conservation status is considered by BirdLife International to be Least Concern. Proposed conservation measures include the investigation of the species' ecology and the protection of suitable habitat.
