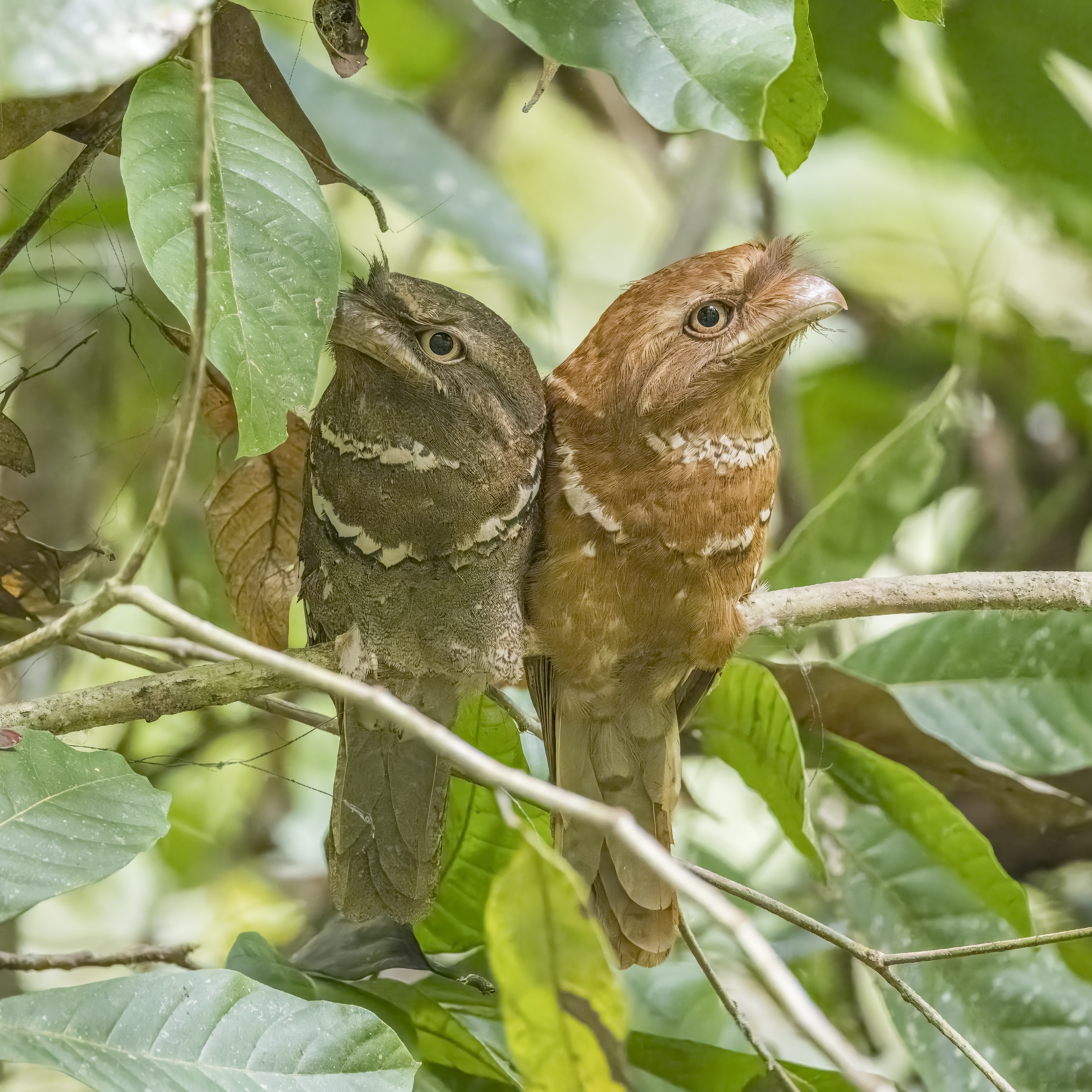
- Philippine frogmouth Batrachostomus septimus female and male

Scientific classification
- Kingdom: Animalia
- Phylum: Chordata
- Class: Aves
- Clade: Vanescaves
- Order: Podargiformes; Matthews, 1918
- Family: Podargidae; Gray, 1847

Genera
- Batrachostomus; Podargus; Rigidipenna

= Frogmouth =

Frogmouths

Family of birds

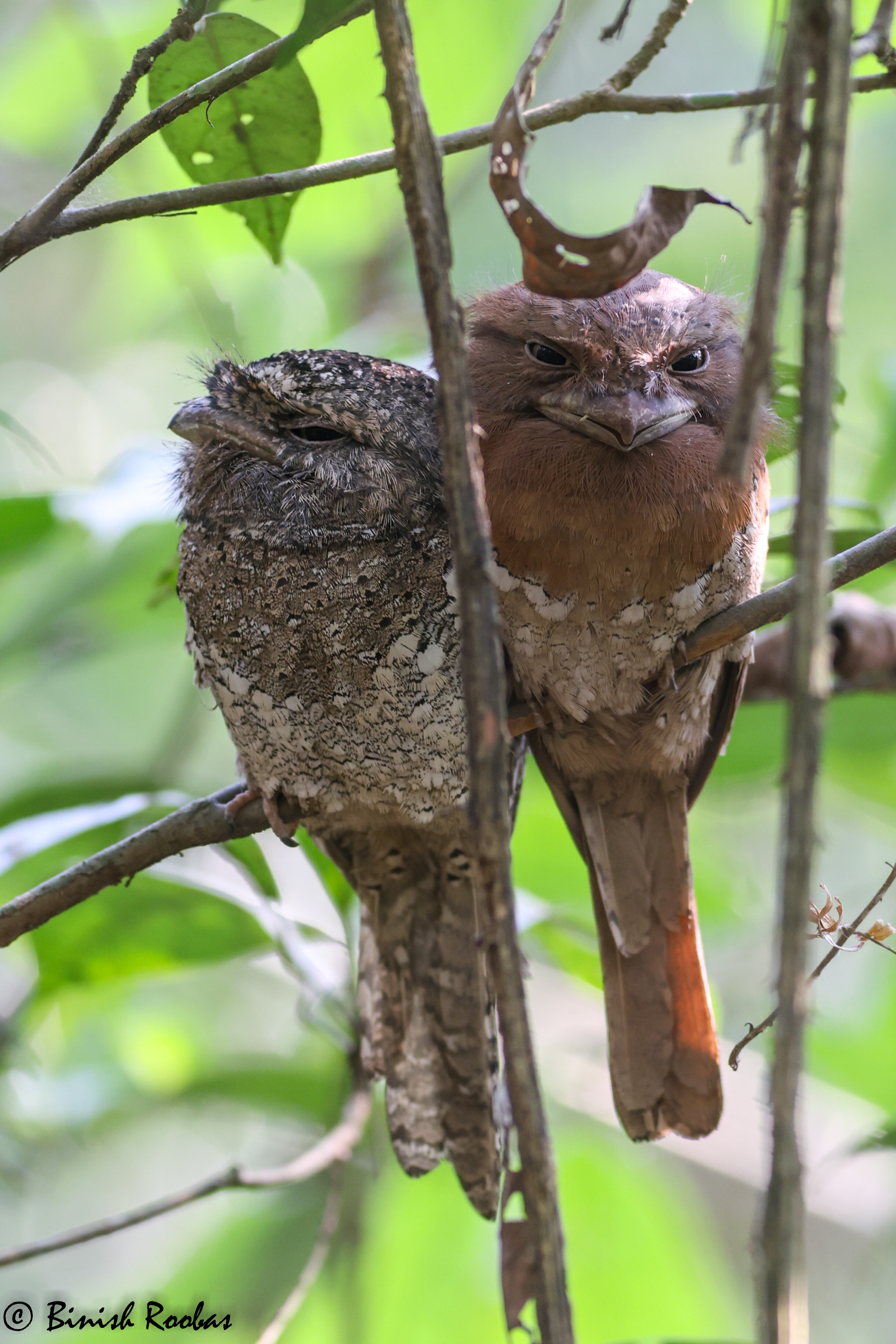
Ceylon frogmouths in the Western Ghats

The frogmouths (Podargidae) are a group of nocturnal birds related to owlet-nightjars, swifts, and hummingbirds. Species in the group are distributed in the Indomalayan and Australasian realms.

== Biology ==
They are named for their large flattened hooked bill and huge frog-like gape, which they use to capture insects. The three Podargus species are large frogmouths restricted to Australia and New Guinea, that have massive flat broad bills. They are known to take larger prey, such as small vertebrates (frogs, mice, etc.), which are sometimes beaten against a stone before swallowing. The ten Batrachostomus frogmouths are found in tropical Asia. They have smaller, more rounded bills and are predominantly insectivorous. Both Podargus and Batrachostomus have bristles around the base of the bill, and Batrachostomus has other, longer bristles which may exist to protect the eyes from insect prey. In April 2007, a new species of frogmouth was described from the Solomon Islands and placed in a newly established genus, Rigidipenna.

Their flight is weak. They rest horizontally on branches during the day, camouflaged by their cryptic plumage. Through convergent evolution as night hunters, they resemble owls, with large front-facing eyes.

Up to three white eggs are laid in the fork of a branch, and are incubated by the female at night and the male in the day.

== Taxonomy ==
DNA-DNA hybridisation studies had suggested that the two frogmouth groups may not be as closely related as previously thought, and that the Asian species may be separable as a new family, the Batrachostomidae. Although frogmouths were formerly included in the order Caprimulgiformes, a 2019 study estimated the divergence between Podargus and Batrachostomus to between 30 and 50 mya and forming a clade well separated from the nightjars and being a sister group of the swifts, hummingbirds, and owlet-nightjars. The name Podargiformes proposed in 1918 by Gregory Mathews was reinstated for the clade.

=== Species ===
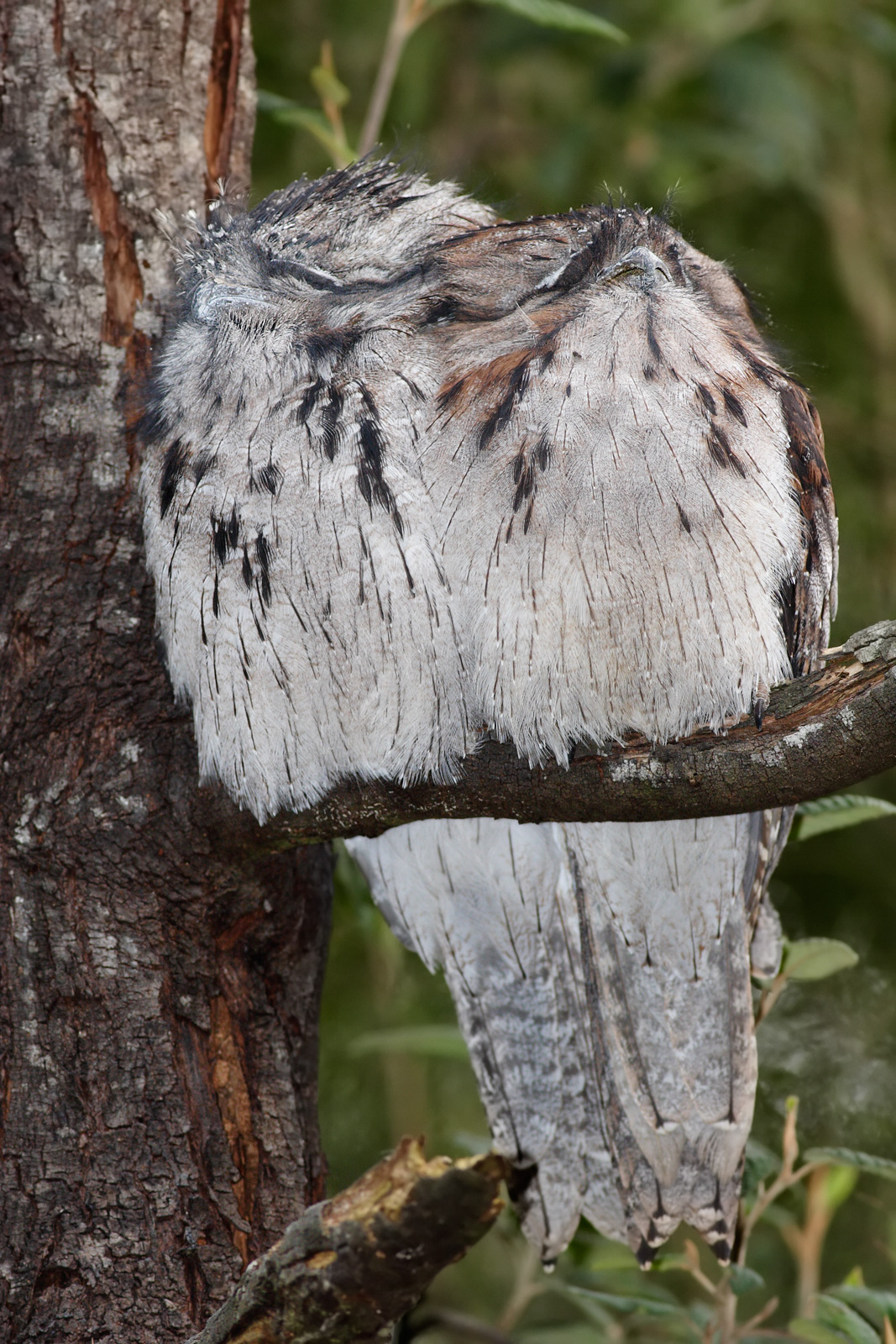
A pair of tawny frogmouths resting in a tree fork during the day

- Genus Podargus

- Tawny frogmouth, Podargus strigoides
- Marbled frogmouth, Podargus ocellatus
- Papuan frogmouth, Podargus papuensis

- Genus Batrachostomus

- Large frogmouth, Batrachostomus auritus
- Dulit frogmouth, Batrachostomus harterti
- Philippine frogmouth, Batrachostomus septimus
- Gould's frogmouth, Batrachostomus stellatus
- Sri Lanka frogmouth, Batrachostomus moniliger
- Hodgson's frogmouth, Batrachostomus hodgsoni
- Sumatran frogmouth, Batrachostomus poliolophus
- Javan frogmouth, Batrachostomus javensis
- Blyth's frogmouth, Batrachostomus affinis
- Sunda frogmouth, Batrachostomus cornutus
- Palawan frogmouth, Batrachostomus chaseni
- Bornean frogmouth, Batrachostomus mixtus

- Genus Rigidipenna

- Solomons frogmouth, Rigidipenna inexpectata

== In culture ==
In a journal article published in April 2021, researchers Katja Thömmes and Gregor Hayn-Leichsenring from the Experimental Aesthetics group at the University Hospital Jena, Germany, found the frogmouth to be the most "instagrammable" type of bird. Using an algorithm to analyze the aesthetic appeal of more than 27,000 bird photographs on Instagram, they found that photos depicting frogmouths received the highest number of likes relative to the posts' exposure to users. The journal article was picked up by several news outlets, including The New York Times and The Guardian.

== Summary of extant species ==
| Common name | Binomial name | Population | Status | Trend | Notes | Image |
|---|---|---|---|---|---|---|
| Large frogmouth | Batrachostomus auritus | unknown | VU | ▼ | Although population is unknown, species is listed as Vulnerable due to rapid deforestation across its known range. | |
| Gould's frogmouth | Batrachostomus stellatus | unknown | NT | ▼ | | |
| Solomons frogmouth | Rigidipenna inexpectata | 1,500 - 7,000 | NT | ▼ | Estimate given is for population of mature individuals. Total population is estimated to be 2,500-9,999 individuals. | |
| Sunda frogmouth | Batrachostomus cornutus | unknown | LC | ▼ | | |
| Dulit frogmouth | Batrachostomus harterti | unknown | LC | ▼ | | |
| Hodgson's frogmouth | Batrachostomus hodgsoni | unknown | LC | ▼ | | |
| Javan frogmouth (Horsfield's frogmouth) | Batrachostomus javensis | unknown | LC | ▼ | The IOC splits two additional species, Blyth's frogmouth (B. affinis) and Palawan frogmouth (B. chaseni) from this species. IUCN/BirdLife International maintain all three species under B. javaensis. | |
| Bornean frogmouth | Batrachostomus mixtus | unknown | LC | ▼ | | |
| Sri Lanka frogmouth | Batrachostomus moniliger | unknown | LC | Steady | | |
| Sumatran frogmouth | Batrachostomus poliolophus | > 10,000 | LC | ▼ | Population value given is a very rough estimate, extrapolated from the large availability of suitable habitat on Sumatra. | |
| Philippine frogmouth | Batrachostomus septimus | unknown | LC | ▼ | | |
| Marbled frogmouth | Podargus ocellatus | unknown | LC | ▼ | | |
| Papuan frogmouth | Podargus papuensis | unknown | LC | ▼ | | |
| Tawny frogmouth | Podargus strigoides | unknown | LC | Steady | | |
