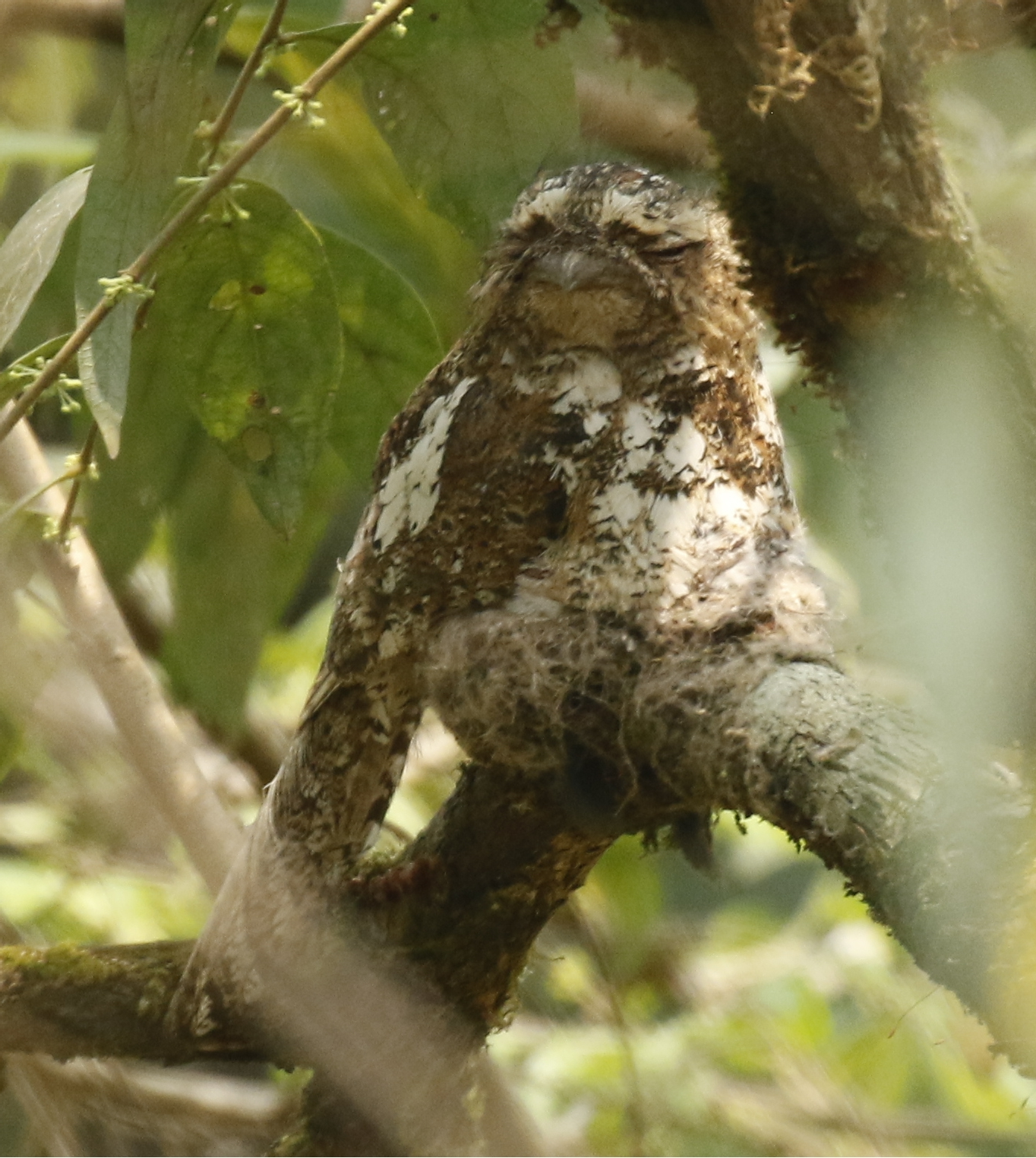

Conservation status
- Least Concern (IUCN 3.1)

Scientific classification
- Kingdom: Animalia
- Phylum: Chordata
- Class: Aves
- Clade: Strisores
- Order: Podargiformes
- Family: Podargidae
- Genus: Batrachostomus
- Species: B. hodgsoni

Binomial name
- Batrachostomus hodgsoni (Gray, 1859)

Subspecies
- B. h. hodgsoni; B. h. indochinae

= Hodgson's frogmouth =

Species of bird

Hodgson's frogmouth (Batrachostomus hodgsoni) is a species of bird in the family Podargidae. It is found in Bangladesh, Bhutan, China, India, Laos, Myanmar, Thailand, Cambodia and Vietnam. Its natural habitat is temperate forests.

The common name is thought to commemorate the British naturalist Brian Houghton Hodgson.

This bird is part of the same clade as nightjars are. Members of both clades are nocturnal and they share similar rictal bristles on the bill which they use to know when to close their bill shut on insects as they hawk. This feature is just a hypothesis by scientists who do not completely understand the true use of those bristles yet. Frogmouths differ from its cousins by heavier bills, shorter and more rounded wings and upright posture when perched.

== Description ==
Hodgson's frogmouth is one of the smaller members of the family Podargidae. As an adult, its length ranges between 24.5 and 27.5 centimetres (9.6 and 10.8 in) and it weighs approximately 50 grams (1.8 oz). The plumage is mottled brown and gray, soft and cryptic, resembling tree bark. The physical appearance differs from other species by a heavier black marking above breast as well as no rufous on breast. Hodgson's frogmouth is the most well-marked sexual dichromatic of all frogmouths. The male is rufous brown. Upper parts are heavily marked with black, especially on the head, with irregular bold whitish markings particularly on scapular and upper mantle which forms a white collar. Underparts are heavily and regularly marked with black, white and rufous. The female is more uniformly rufous, with irregular black-tipped white spots on the upper mantle, scapular and underparts. Males are duller in color than females. Frogmouths are distinguishable by their large head and body compared to their small legs and feet. This feature blocks them from walking and make them exclusively arboreal. They have a thick large bill that takes the most part of their face and make them look like an angry old man. This strong bill is covered with rictal bristles at its base. The utility of the bristles on their face is much debated by biologists. The most popular hypothesis is that the bird would use them to detect insects and know when to close their bill shut on the invertebrates when this one is near the mouth. They have additional long facial bristles suspected to protect the eyes. Their large head and their bill also contain a pair of two large yellow-rounded eyes which help them to see in the dark during night times. The Asian bird possesses short round wings and tail which explain its very local territory. As they do not differ from other frogmouth except some slight color variation, the best way to identify Hodgson's frogmouth is by its call.

Youngs are born with white down that is replaced by a darker, grayish down before juvenile plumage is acquired. They also have warm-tinged above with black and pale brown bars. They do not possess nuchal collar which only comes after primary molt.

== Taxonomy ==
The Hodgson's frogmouth is part of the genus Batrachostomus within the family Podargidae. This family contains 15 species separated into two genera: Podargus (3 species) and Batrachostomus (12 species). The two genera differ by their size and their geographical location. Podargus are the taller individuals going up to 60 cm in heights which is twice the size of the Batrachostomus individuals.

There are two recognized subspecies of Hodgson's frogmouth:

- B. h. hodgsoni – living in Myanmar, India and Bangladesh.
- B. h. indochinae – living in Indonesia, Thailand and Laos.

== Distribution habitat ==
This arboreal species is an adept of broad leaves of evergreen or mixed coniferous tropical rain forests inside of which it will be found mainly on the middle and lower storeys. It is found in tropical regions of Asia at altitudes ranging from 300–1,900 metres (980–6,230 ft). The Podargidae is a non-migratory bird family as well as solitary individuals, the only social interaction happens during the breeding season where the individuals all converge in the Indian region between the month of April and June.

The home range of the Hodgson's frogmouth consists of all tropical regions of Asia. Those region corresponds to the South of Asia, this is why it has been heard or seen in Sri Lanka, SE Asia, Indonesia, E Himalayas, NE India, Bangladesh, Laos, W, N, E Myanmar, NW Thailand, Laos, and C Annam. The first Hodgson's frogmouth in central Laos was recorded in 1994 during the month of April in a dry evergreen forest at 1000 m of altitude. The two subspecies are separated geographically between the Southeast and Southwest of Asia. B. h. hodgsoni lives more west in countries like Myanmar, India, and Bangladesh while B. h. indochinae dominates the region more east like Indonesia, Thailand and Laos. Species from the other genus Podargus are also located in Australia but that is not the case of the Batrachostomus species.

== Behavior ==
=== Diet ===
Hodgson's frogmouth survives on a mainly insectivorous diet. It includes most of the time moths, beetles and other large insects. The nocturnal active bird catches prey on short flights from its perches using shrike-like or roller-like hunting method. Because of its small rounded wings and tail, it is not capable of hawking for insects on the wing. The Asian bird also likes to look for insects inside trunks or living tree branches which it can easily dig with its large strong bill set with rictal bristles at the base of it allowing the bird to detect insects.

=== Camouflage ===
To protect themselves during the daytime, Hodgson's frogmouth uses a camouflage technique. This bird benefits from the resemblance of its plumage to bark, and is easily confused with a part of the tree by predators. In case of a predator hanging too close, it developed a technique that could be called the "broken branch": the small bird freezes sitting on its nest and its partner and points its bill upward making one with the tree. Males incubate in daytime that's why they have duller colors than females which are more active in nocturnal territory defense.

=== Reproduction ===
The breeding season occurs between April and June in the Indian region. Hodgson's frogmouths are observable also in Annam during the period before reproduction in late February or early March. Contrarily to the other genus of Podargidae, who build bulky nest with twigs, the Batrachostomus species build smaller cup-shaped soft padded nests lined with their own down on horizontal branches or tree forks. The incubation of 2 to 4 small white eggs (30 × 20 to 51 × 30 mm) last for a period of approximately 30 days. The male does the nestling but both sexes feed the young on regurgitated food. Young stay in the nest until able to fly.

=== Song ===
This species is very vocal during breeding. Calls range from soft wheezy whistles to harsh tremulous rattles. The song is soft with slightly trilled rising whistles: whaaee, whaaow, wheeow-a. Sometimes soft chuckling whooo notes are added.

== Conservation status ==
Two species from the Bratachostomus genus have been declining due to habitat fragmentation and habitat loss of lowland rain forest but the very large habitat at their disposition allow them to not approach the thresholds for Vulnerable under the range size criterion. Even though the population size has not been quantified, it is not believed to approach the criterion of a decline greater than 30% over ten years or three generations to be considered vulnerable. For these reasons the species is evaluated as Least Concern.

== Gallery ==
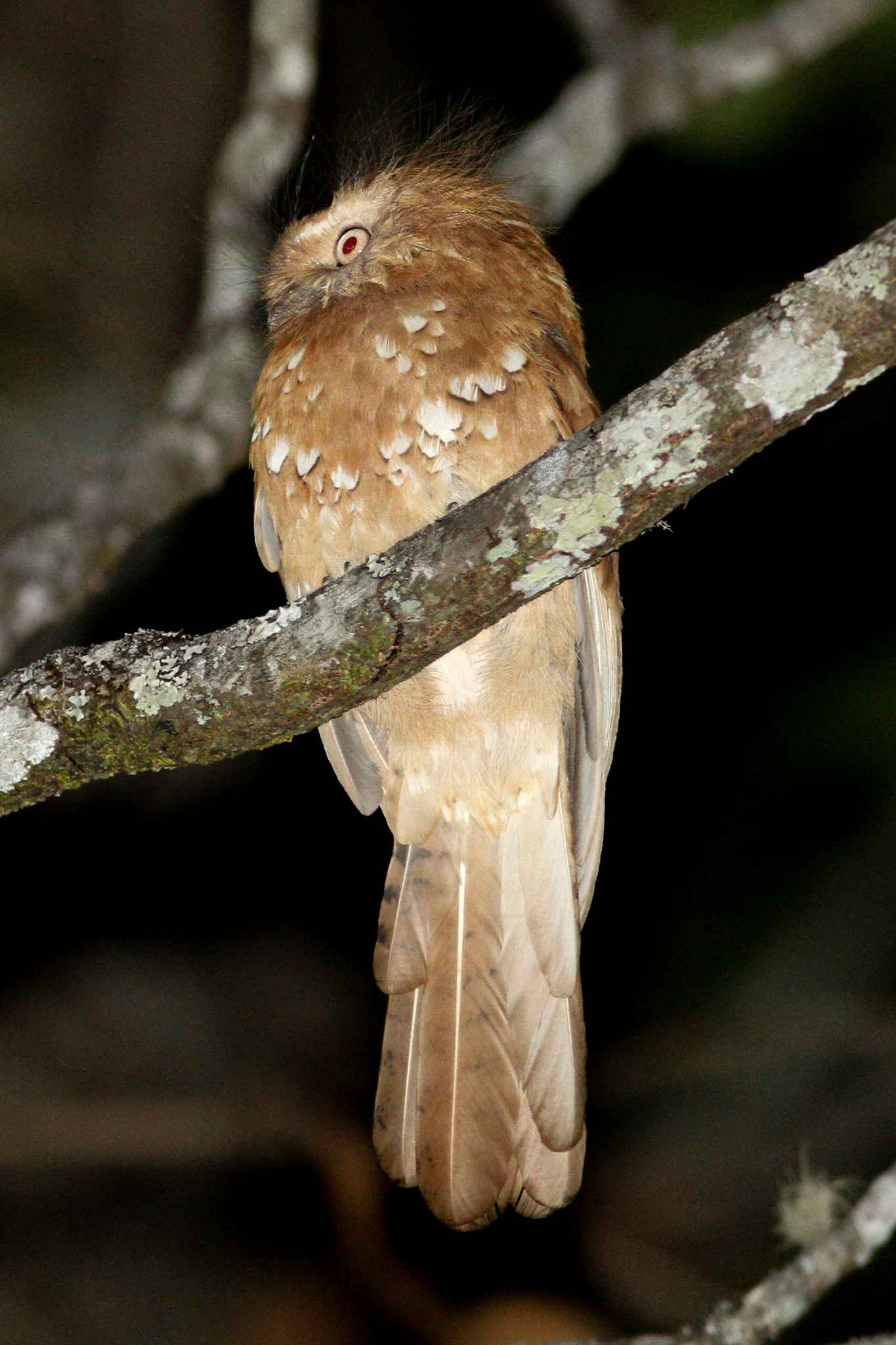
Hodgson's Frogmouth (B. hodgsoni) from Thailand

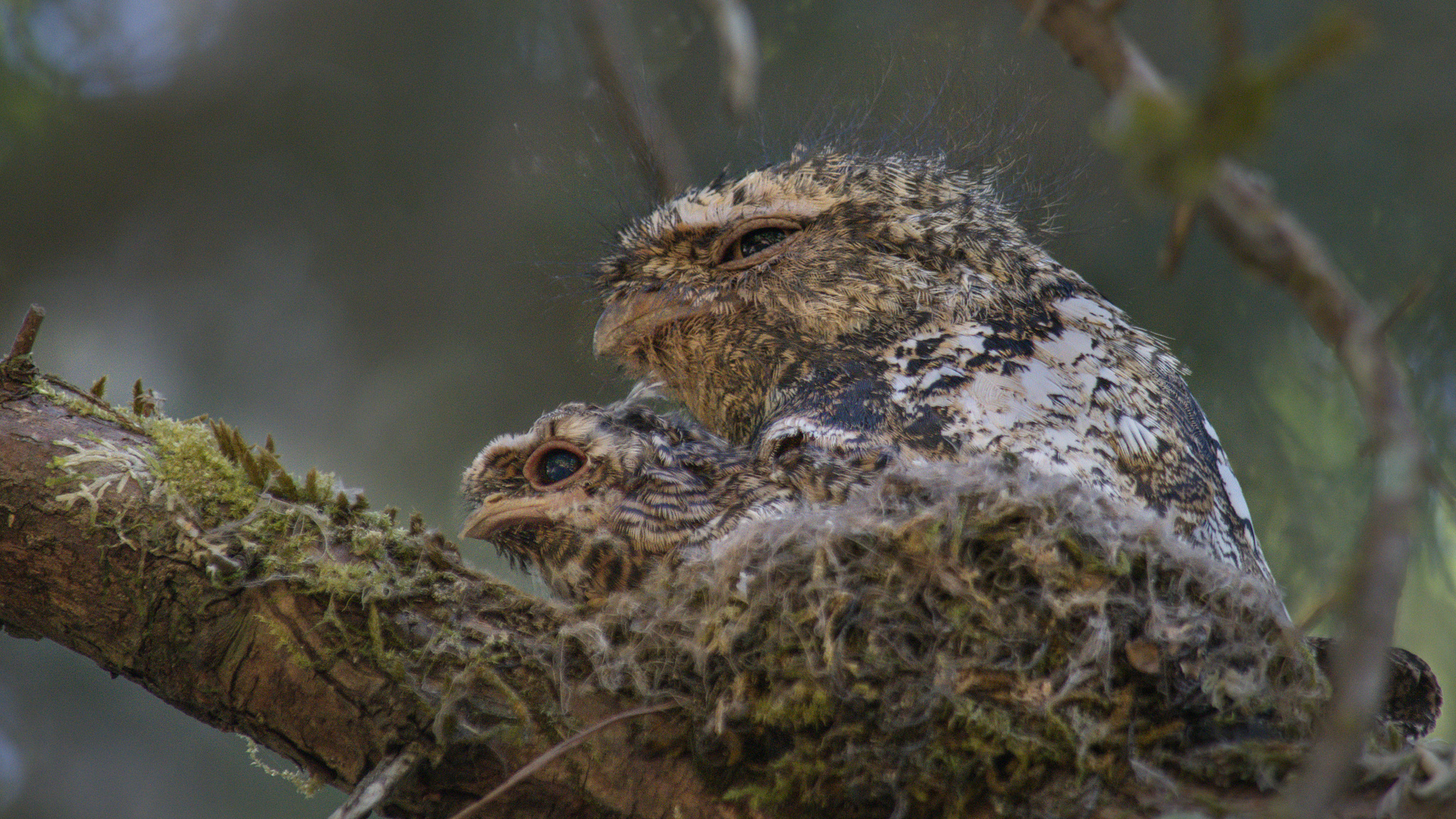
Hodgson's Frogmouth (B. hodgsoni) nesting

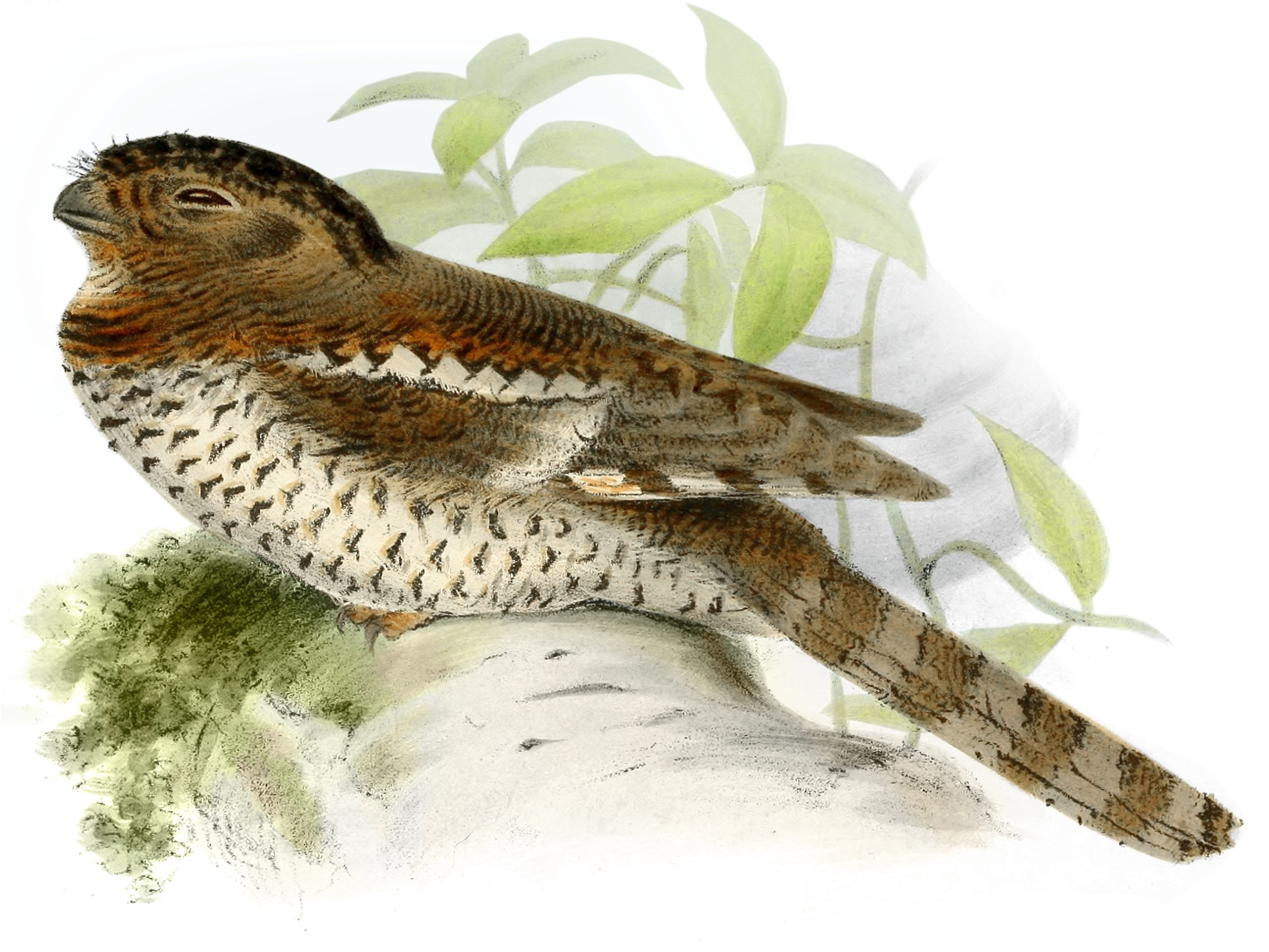
Scientific illustration by Joseph Wolf, for the Zoological Society of London, c.1860
