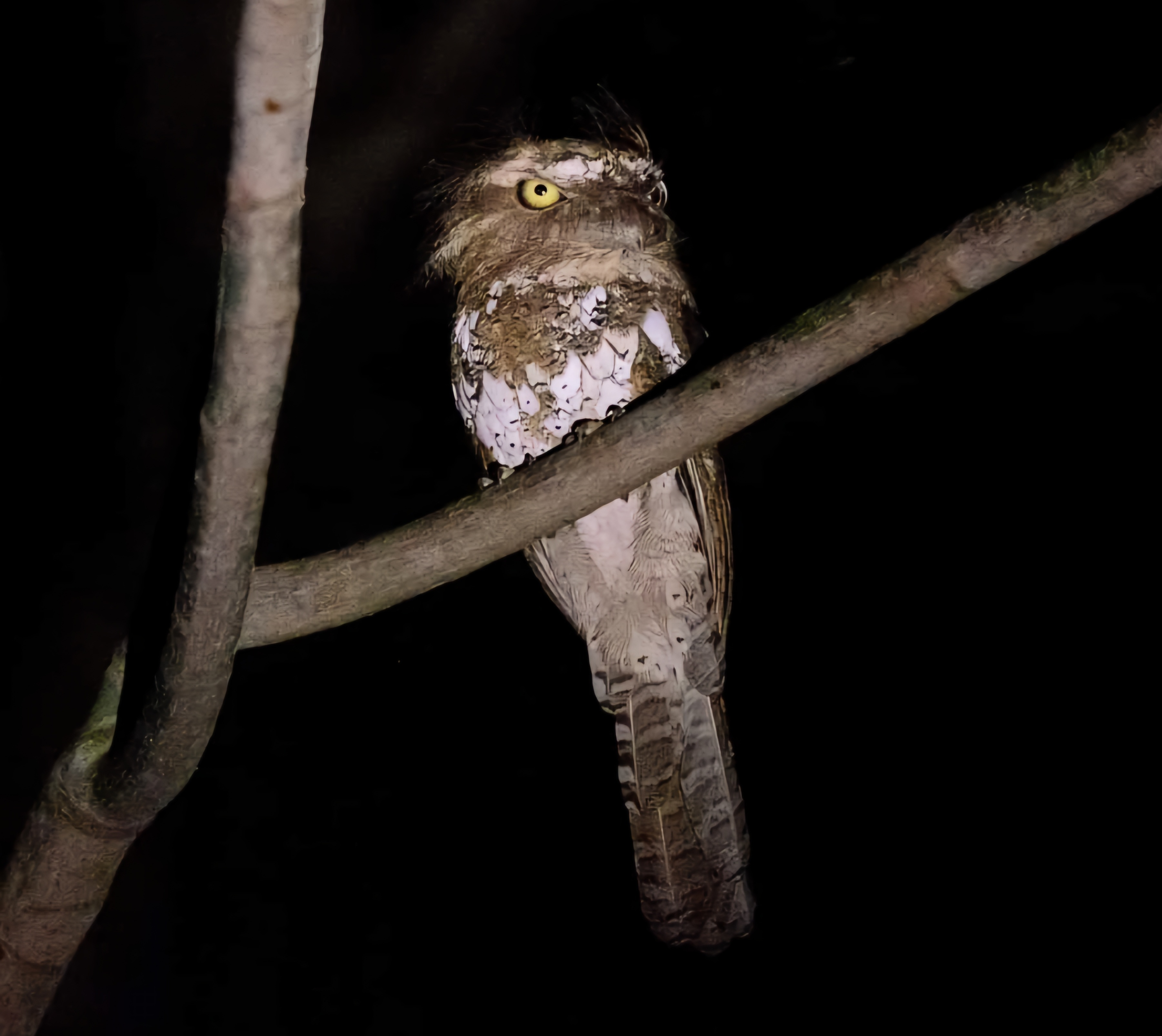

Scientific classification
- Kingdom: Animalia
- Phylum: Chordata
- Class: Aves
- Order: Podargiformes
- Family: Podargidae
- Genus: Batrachostomus
- Species: B. chaseni

Binomial name
- Batrachostomus chaseni Stresemann, 1937

= Palawan frogmouth =

Species of bird

The Palawan frogmouth (Batrachostomus chaseni) is a species of bird in the family Podargidae. It is found on Palawan in the Philippines. Its natural habitat is tropical moist lowland forest. It is sometimes considered conspecific with the Javan and Blyth's frogmouth.

== Description and taxonomy ==
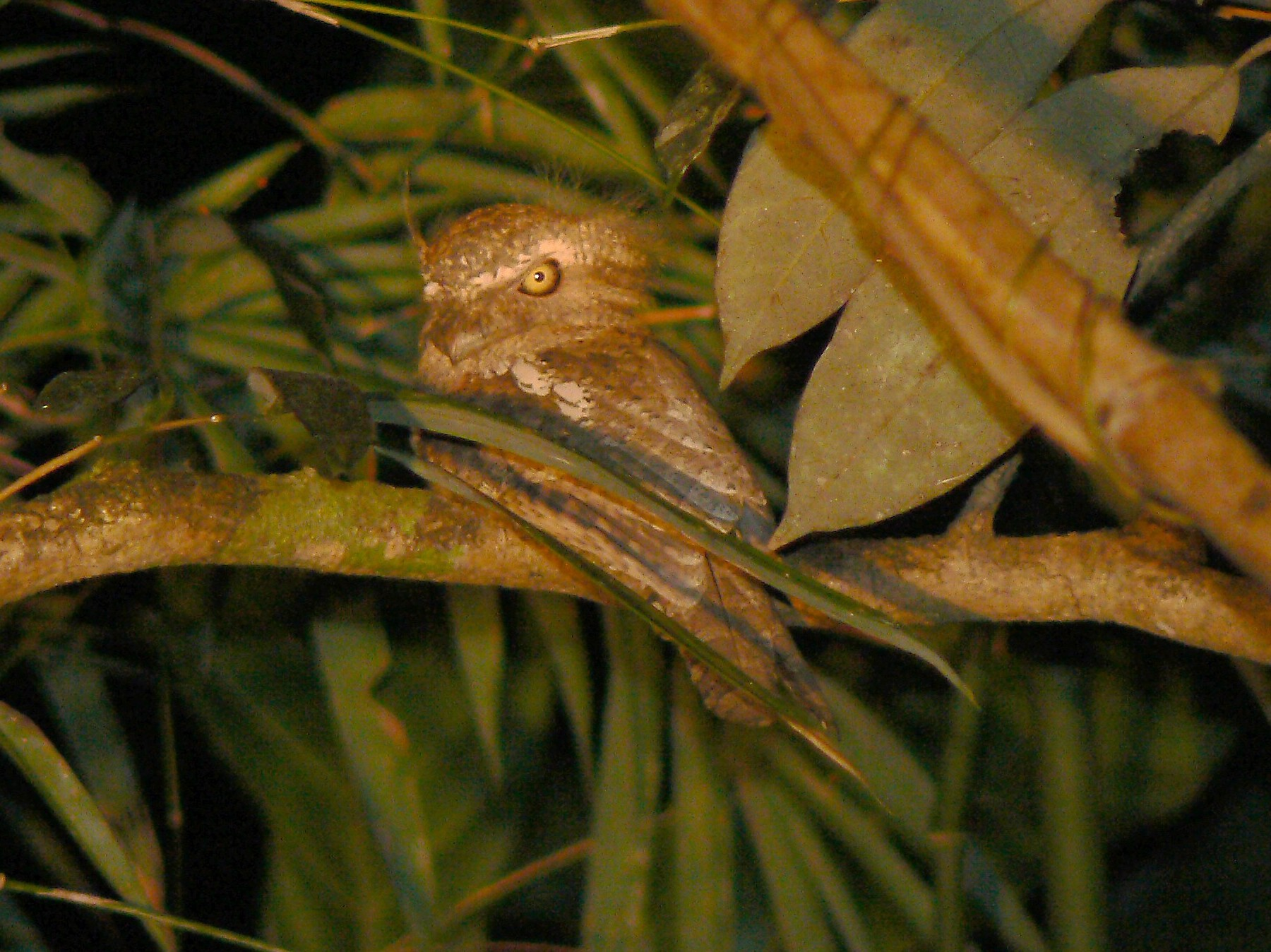

It was formerly conspecific with the Javan and Blyth's frogmouth under the Horsfield's frogmouth species complex. It is most similar to Blyth's but is differentiated by the lack of black spotting on its crown and having white spots instead. However, there seems to be a large amount of variance and morphs between each individual and thus further study is required to properly validate its status as a species.

== Ecology and behavior ==
Diet is presumed to be insects but there is no published data on the specifics of its diet. Breeding season is presumed to be from June to August. Nest is a small pad of vegetation mixed with down feathers. Clutch size is believed to be 1 to 2 white eggs.

== Habitat and conservation status ==
Its habitat is primary lowland forest and second growth with dense tangles and bamboo. Elevational range is poorly known.

As the Handbook of the Birds of the World and the International Union for Conservation of Nature, recognize the Palawan frogmouth as a subspecies of the Javan frogmouth, the IUCN has yet to assess it. However, Palawan's forests are under threat due to illegal logging, deforestation and mining and it is reasonable to believe that this bird's population is declining. The whole of Palawan was designated as a Biosphere Reserve; however, protection and enforcement of laws has been difficult and these threats still continue. It occurs in just one protected area in the Iwahig Prison and Penal Farm.
