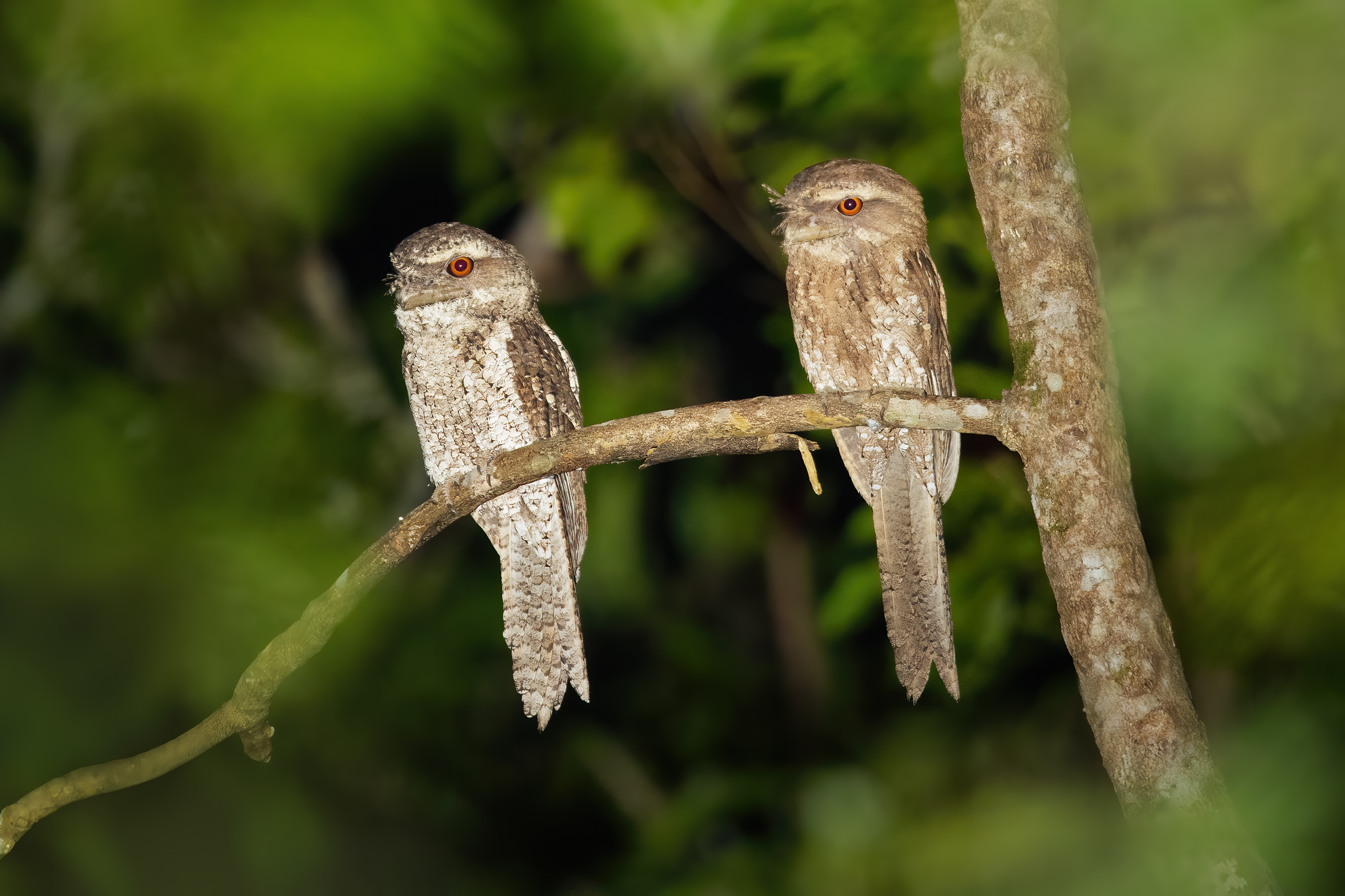
- Subspecies marmoratus pair

Conservation status
- Least Concern (IUCN 3.1)

Scientific classification
- Kingdom: Animalia
- Phylum: Chordata
- Class: Aves
- Clade: Strisores
- Order: Podargiformes
- Family: Podargidae
- Genus: Podargus
- Species: P. ocellatus

Binomial name
- Podargus ocellatus Quoy & Gaimard, 1832

= Marbled frogmouth =

Species of bird

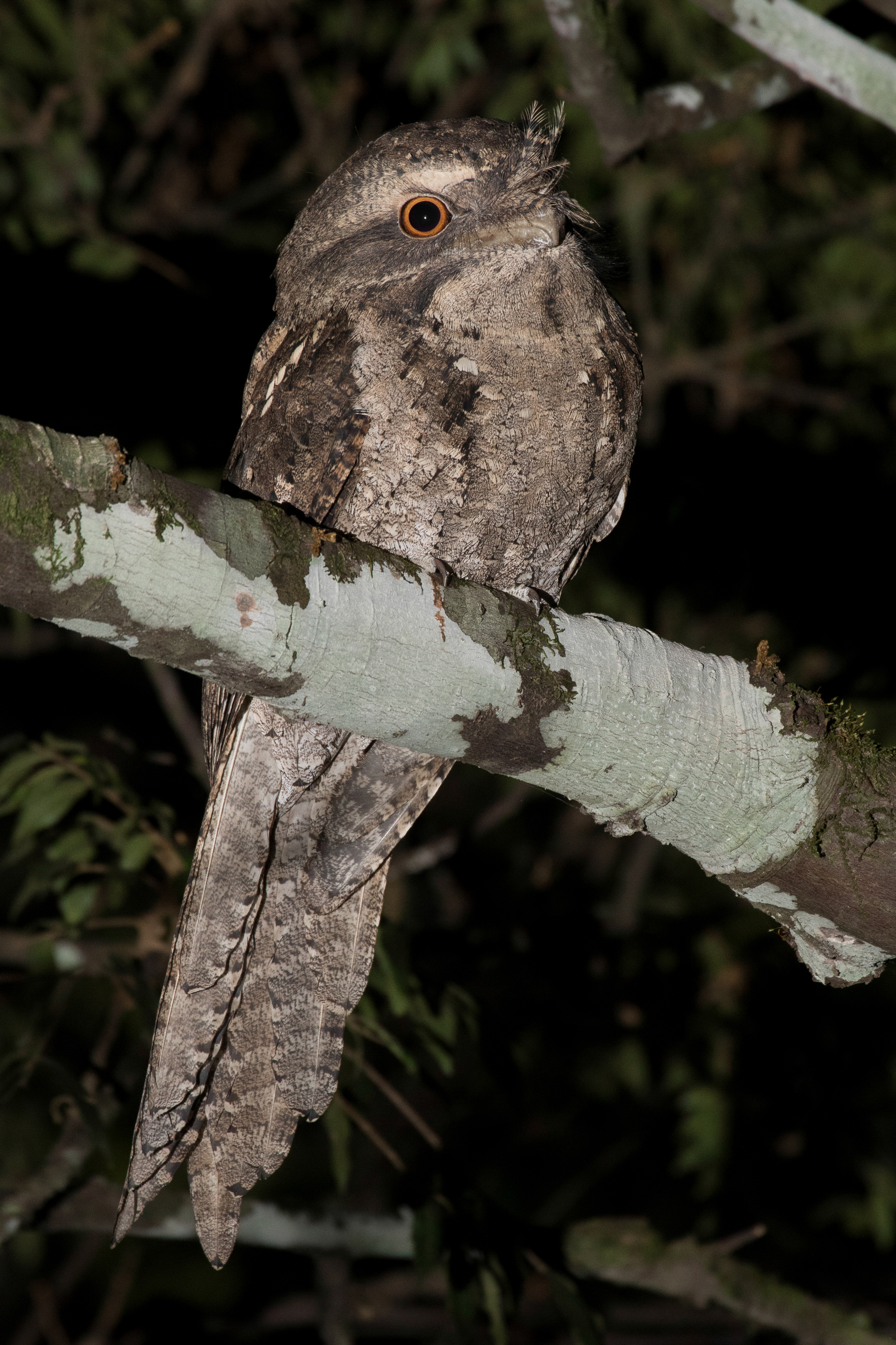
Subspecies plumiferus in Mount Glorious, Queensland, Australia

The marbled frogmouth (Podargus ocellatus) is a bird in the family Podargidae. The species was first described by Jean René Constant Quoy and Joseph Paul Gaimard in 1830. It is found in the Aru Islands, New Guinea and Queensland. Its natural habitats are subtropical or tropical moist lowland forest and subtropical or tropical moist montane forest.

== Taxonomy ==
There are five subspecies recognised; the nominate ocellatus is found in New Guinea and surrounding islands. Two subspecies are found on islands of Papua New Guinea; intermedius is found on Trobriand Islands and D'Entrecasteaux Islands, meeki is endemic to Tagula Island. Australia has two subspecies; marmoratus is found on Cape York Peninsula, plumiferus (known locally as the plumed frogmouth) is found in south-east Queensland.

Rigidipenna inexpectatus, endemic to four islands in the Solomon Islands, was formerly considered a subspecies. It was split into its own genus, Rigidipenna, in 2007.

== Distribution and habitat ==
The Conondale ranges in Queensland's Sunshine Coast is considered a stronghold for the plumed frogmouth; notable populations are within the Conondale National Park. The species is rare and is listed as vulnerable in Queensland and occurs in subtropical rainforest and vineforest at altitudes from 50–800 m. The species roosts in the canopy of and is considered cryptic and extremely hard to find or study. Current populations are threatened by land clearing, inappropriate fire regimes and timber harvesting with future impacts of climate change posing additional risks. There have been estimates of the current pairs in the Conondale ranges being around 800 pairs with the current range of the species is just under 2000 ha with some potential future habitat increase in population being created by regenerating rainforest previously logged. Its specialised habitat requirements being un-logged pristine forests, the species is considered extremely vulnerable due to significant habitat reduction. Future harvesting of native timber in the Conondale region also poses risk.

== Behavior ==
P. ocellatus is a nocturnal ground feeder. During the day, it sleeps on a tree branch with its beak pointing upward, taking on the appearance of a tree branch. To cope with the heat and humidity of its tropical home, P. ocellatus has heart and respiration rates lower than is typical for birds of its size. During periods of hyperthermia, it will enact panting as a cooling mechanism, with more efficient cooling effect than is seen in other bird species performing the same action.
