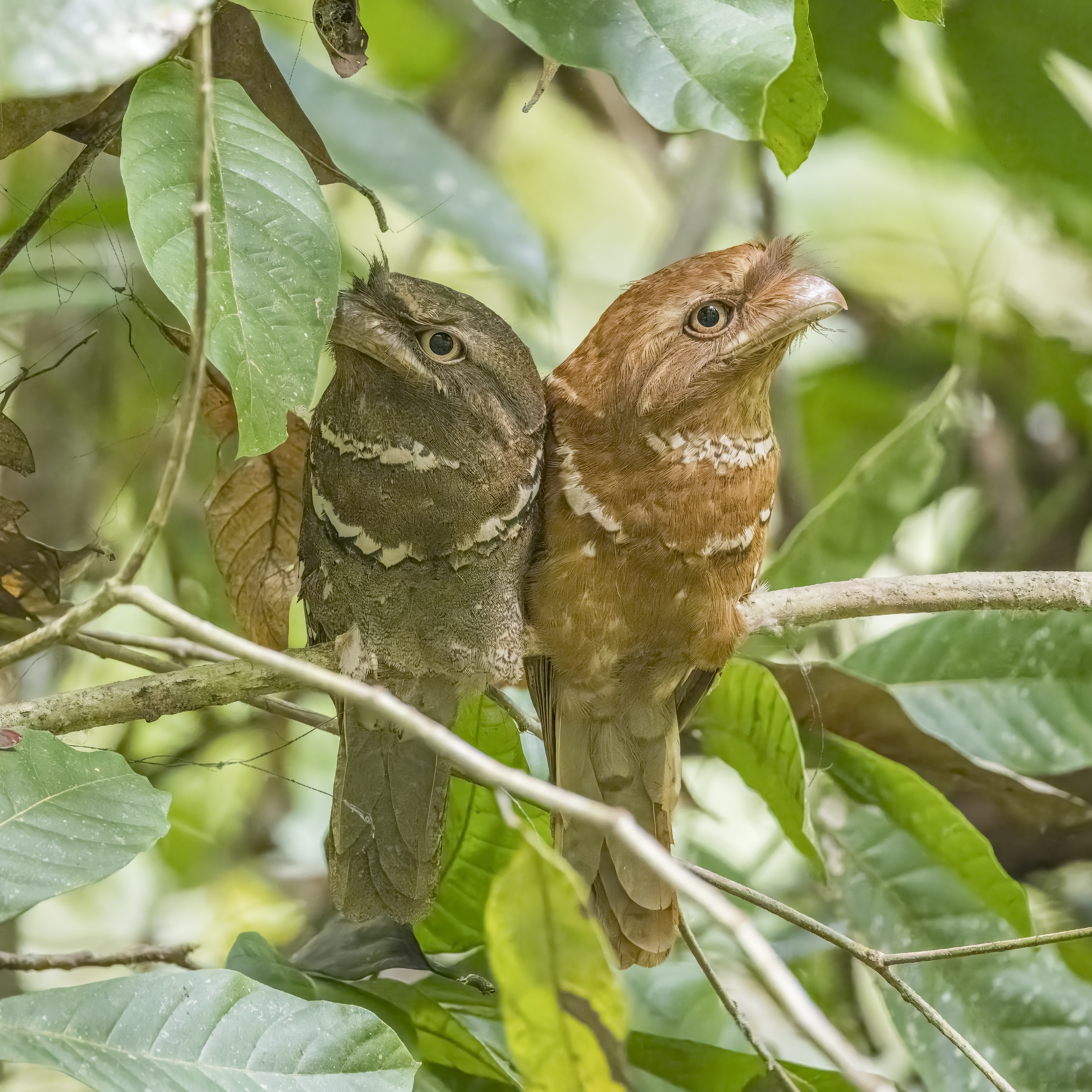
- Philippine frogmouth Batrachostomus septimus female and male, Bohol

Conservation status
- Least Concern (IUCN 3.1)

Scientific classification
- Kingdom: Animalia
- Phylum: Chordata
- Class: Aves
- Clade: Strisores
- Order: Podargiformes
- Family: Podargidae
- Genus: Batrachostomus
- Species: B. septimus

Binomial name
- Batrachostomus septimus Tweeddale, 1877

= Philippine frogmouth =

Species of bird

The Philippine frogmouth (Batrachostomus septimus) is a nocturnal bird that can be found throughout the Philippine archipelago. It is common in lowland forests and maturing second growth. There is little information about the bird. It feeds on grasshoppers, cicadas, crickets and beetles.

== Description ==
Like all frogmouths, the Philippine frogmouth has large eyes for better night vision, a large flat bill for capturing insects, and cryptic plumage which allows them to be camouflaged while perched during the day. They are found in the Philippines, and can be confused with the Philippine Nightjar, which despite its similar shape has very different plumage.

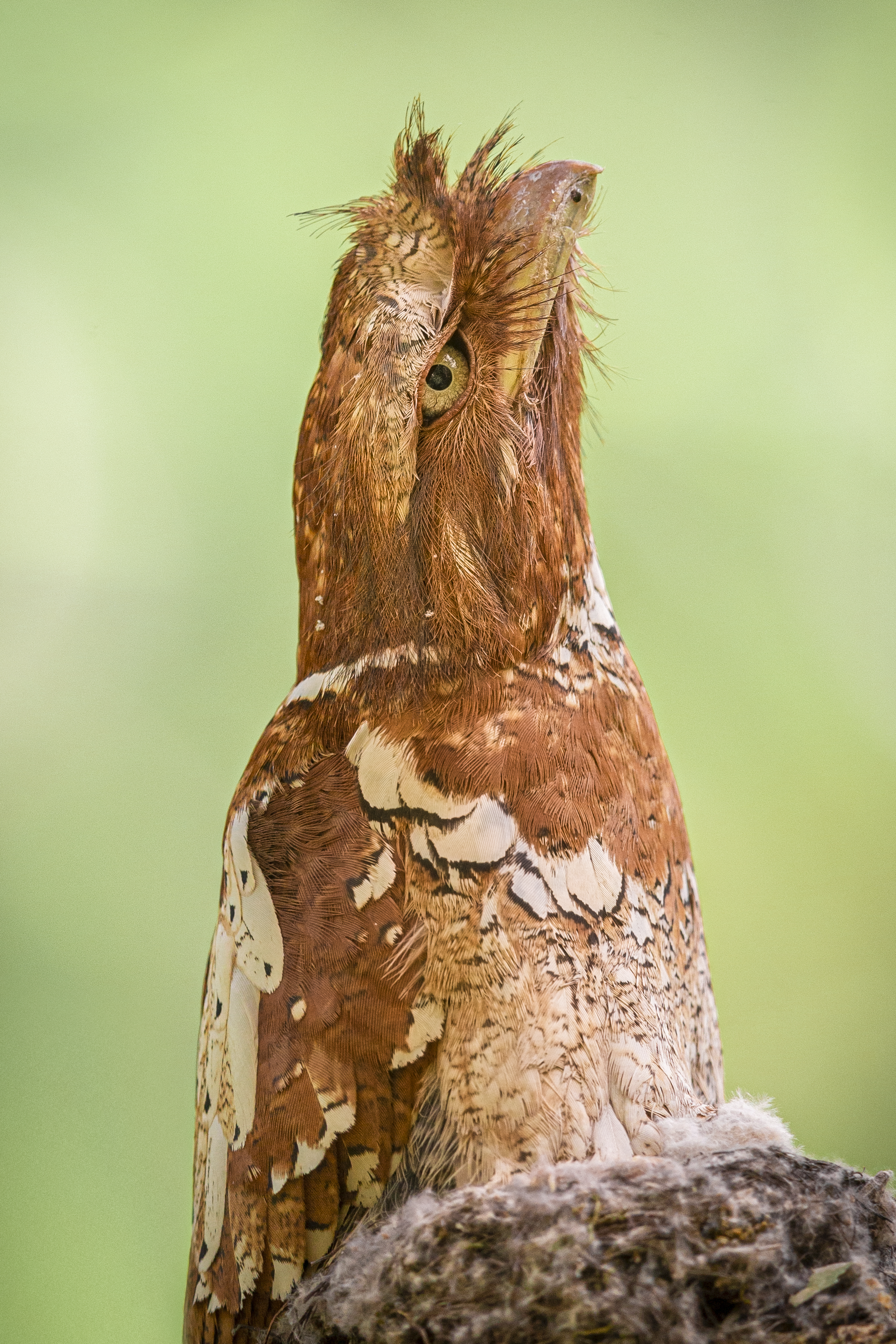

The Philippine frogmouth is a medium frogmouth, being 24–26cm long, with two color morphs (and intermediate phases); one is a chestnut rufous with deep rufous ground color, the other a lighter brown with buff and black barring. Both morphs have three distinct light buff or white bands; one on their hindneck, a second on their lower throat, and a third around the lower breast. They have a yellow-orange iris and brown feet and bill. Although males and females have a similar appearance, females are typically darker and plainer.

== Distribution and habitat ==
The Philippine frogmouth is a sedentary bird, endemic to the Philippines, and is widely distributed within the archipelago, though noticeably absent from Palawan. Though rare, there have been sightings in India and Australia. They are thought to be found in lowland and maturing (but not mature) second growth forests, but their habitat is not known in detail as they are only active at night and do not sing songs or have loud calls.

== Behavior and ecology ==
=== Reproduction ===
The nest is built from a horizontal branch that is placed two to five meters above ground. It is made from the parent's own downy feathers which is held in place using spider silk, moss and lichens. The female lays one egg per season. The male incubates the egg during the day and the female at night.

=== Diet and feeding ===
Philippine frogmouths are adaptable, and eat large insects, such as grasshoppers, cicadas, crickets, and beetles. They feed by waiting on low branches and striking when they notice an insect moving below. Like other species in the genus Batrachostomus, the Philippine frogmouth has elongated bristles around the base of their bill, believed to protect their eyes from prey.

=== Vocalizations ===
Male calls are a series of low, deep woah, wash, Guam, or g-aw noises, or a short even trill. Female calls are louder, a short mewl that descends in pitch. Both sexes have a harsh growling call they repeat several times per minute, and a harsh staccato-like scream that is believed to be an alarm call.

== Conservation ==
The Philippine frogmouth is currently listed as species of least concern by the IUCN as of 2012, though it is believed its population is slowly declining due to habitat destruction. The reason for this listing is the large range, the rate of decline not reaching the threshold to qualify as a vulnerable species, and while the population size has not been officially quantified, it is believed to exceed the threshold to be considered vulnerable based on the population size criterion.

Occurs in a few protected areas in Northern Sierra Madre Natural Park and Bataan National Park on Luzon, Northwest Panay Peninsula Natural Park, Balinsasayao Twin Lakes Natural Park, Northern Negros Natural Park in West Visayas, Pasonanca Natural Park, Mount Kitanglad and Mount Apo in Mindanao, Rajah Sikatuna Protected Landscape in Bohol and Samar Island Natural Park but actual protection and enforcement from illegal logging and hunting are lax.
