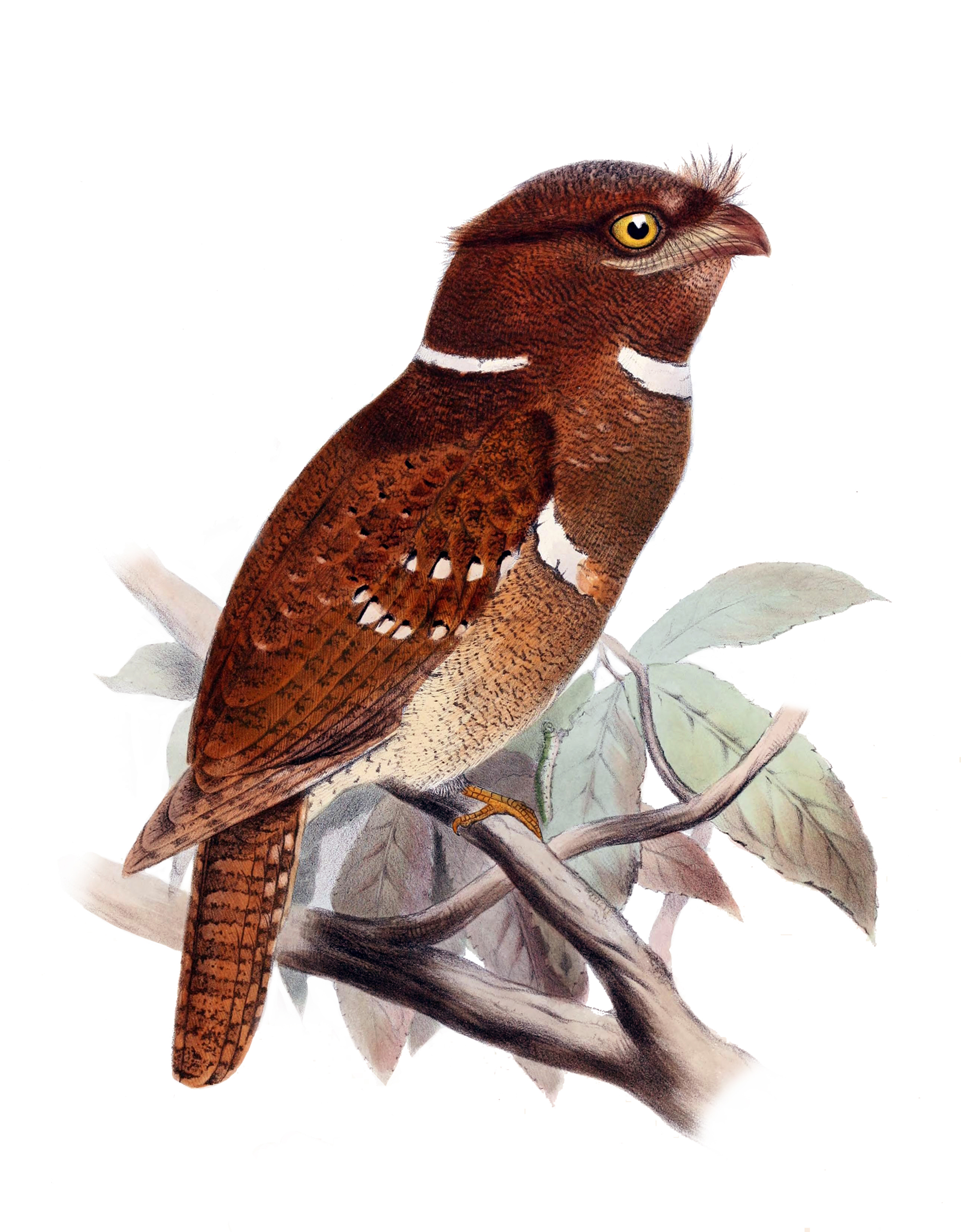
- Philippine frogmouth (Batrachostomus septimus)

Scientific classification
- Kingdom: Animalia
- Phylum: Chordata
- Class: Aves
- Order: Podargiformes
- Family: Podargidae
- Genus: Batrachostomus; Gould, 1838

Type species
- Podargus auritus Gray, JE, 1829

Species
- See text

= Batrachostomus =

Genus of birds

Batrachostomus is a genus of frogmouths. They are found in South and Southeast Asia.

== Taxonomy ==
The genus Batrachostomus was introduced in 1838 by the English ornithologist John Gould to accommodate a single species, Podargus auritus Gray, JE, the large frogmouth, which is therefore the type species. The generic name is a direct translation from the Ancient Greek for 'frogmouth'; batracho-/βατραχο- 'frog' and stoma-/στομα 'mouth'.

The genus contains 12 species:

Image	Scientific name	Common name	Distribution
	Batrachosomus auritus	Large frogmouth	Malay peninsula, Sumatra and Borneo
	Batrachosomus harterti	Dulit frogmouth	Borneo montane rain forests
	Batrachosomus septimus	Philippine frogmouth	Philippines
	Batrachosomus stellatus	Gould's frogmouth	Malay peninsula, Sumatra and Borneo
	Batrachosomus moliliger	Sri Lanka frogmouth	southwest India and Sri Lanka
	Batrachosomus hodgsoni	Hodgson's frogmouth	montane northeast India and Indochina
-	Batrachosomus poliolophus	Sumatran frogmouth	Sumatra
-	Batrachosomus mixtus	Bornean frogmouth	Borneo
-	Batrachosomus javensis	Javan frogmouth	Java
	Batrachosomus affinis	Blyth's frogmouth	Southeast Asia
-	Batrachosomus chaseni	Palawan frogmouth	Palawan
-	Batrachosomus cornutus	Sunda frogmouth	Sumatra and Borneo
