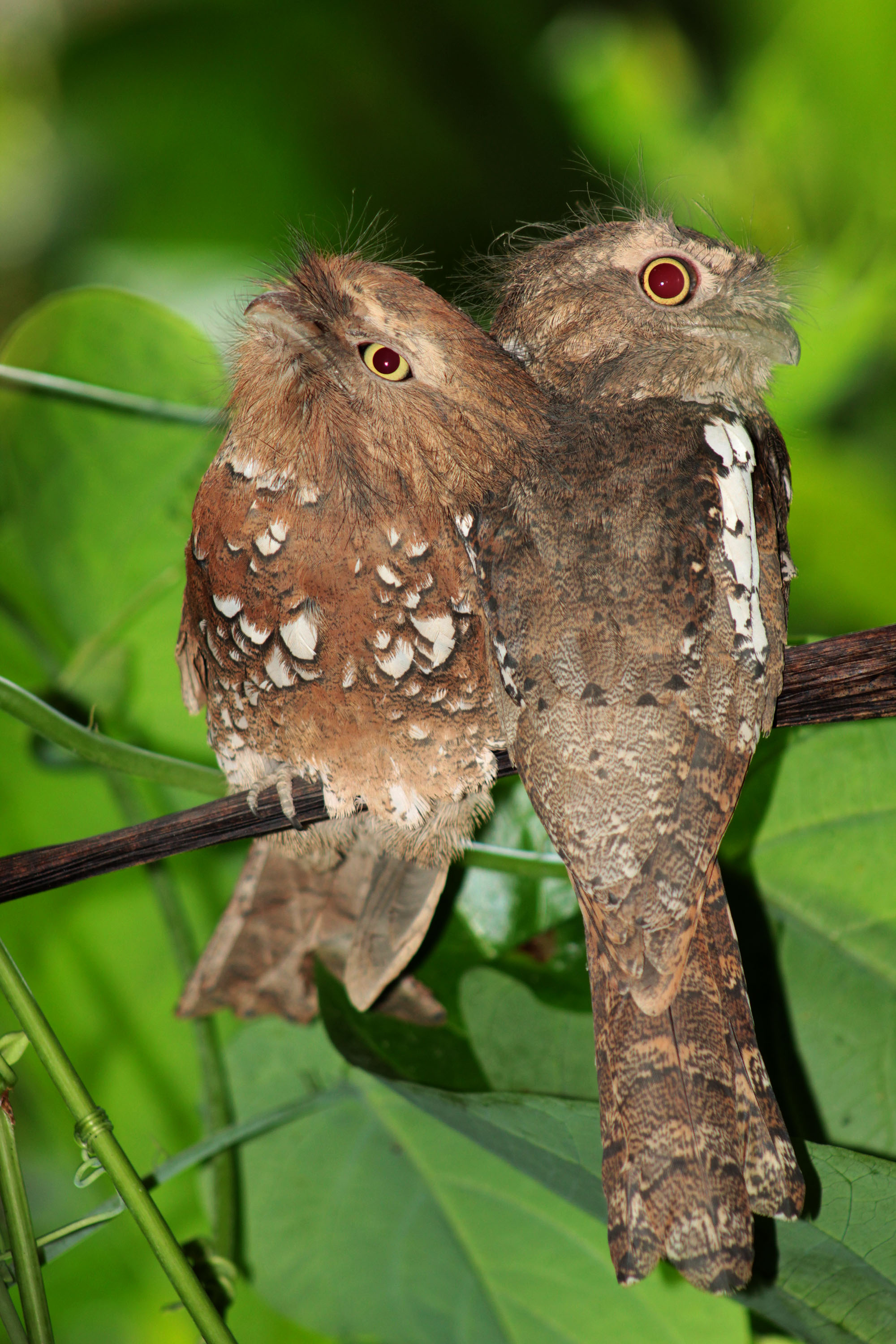

Conservation status
- Least Concern (IUCN 3.1)

Scientific classification
- Kingdom: Animalia
- Phylum: Chordata
- Class: Aves
- Clade: Strisores
- Order: Podargiformes
- Family: Podargidae
- Genus: Batrachostomus
- Species: B. javensis

Binomial name
- Batrachostomus javensis (Horsfield, 1821)

= Javan frogmouth =

Species of bird

The Javan frogmouth (Batrachostomus javensis), sometimes known as Horsfield's frogmouth, is a species of bird in the family Podargidae. It is sometimes considered conspecific with the Blyth's and Palawan frogmouths. Found in Southeast Asia, Indonesia and the Philippines, it lives in subtropical or tropical moist lowland forest.

== Taxonomy ==
The Javan frogmouth was first described in 1821 by the American naturalist Thomas Horsfield as Batrachostomus javensis. The species was later split by Sibley and Monroe into B. javensis and B. affinis in 1990 and 1993, and in 1997, B. pygmaeus, was described by Alviola as being a species "new to science". However, Holyoak in 1999 and Dickinson in 2003, synonymized these new species with B. javensis.

== Description ==
The species grows to a length of about 22 cm (9 in). The upper parts are a mixture of brown, grey, buff and white, spotted with black. The scapulars have several large oval white spots. There is a white stripe above the eye and a white semi-collar. The underparts are brown with buff, cinnamon and white speckling. The flanks and belly are generally paler, with some brown barring. Female birds are rather tawnier and brighter than males, and juveniles are similar to the adults but paler and duller. The beak is brown, the iris yellow and the legs brown.

== Subspecies distribution and habitat ==
The Javan frogmouth ranges across tropical southeastern Asia. There are three subspecies:

- B. j. continentalis is found in Cambodia, Laos, Myanmar, and Thailand;
- B. j. affinis is found in Peninsular Malaysia, Philippines, Sarawak, Sabah, Brunei, Borneo and Sumatra; and
- B. j. javensis occurs in Java.

The typical habitat is lowland evergreen tropical forest including swampy areas, especially areas with dense undergrowth. It sometimes occurs in deciduous forest, and also in plantations, secondary growth forests and urban parks. Its altitude range is up to at least 800 m (2,600 ft), and it is found higher than this on Java.

== Ecology ==
Like other frogmouths, this species is nocturnal and crepuscular. It feeds on such insects as butterflies and moths, ants, grasshoppers, cicadas, beetles, earwigs, cockroaches, caterpillars and small molluscs. Food may be picked up from the ground or gleaned from foliage and branches, or perhaps caught on the wing. It roosts fairly close to the ground, singly or in pairs, crosswise on small branches. It sometimes perches at the top of tall trees during the night.

The nest is built on a low, level branch about 4.5 cm (1.8 in) in diameter and is a very shallow cup made of moss, downy feathers and bark fragments. One or two oval white eggs are laid and are incubated by the parent bird lying along the branch.

== Status ==
B. javensis is generally considered to be an uncommon bird but it has a very wide range and no particular threats have been recognised, so the International Union for Conservation of Nature has assessed its conservation status as being of "least concern". It is probably under-recorded in most parts of its range.
