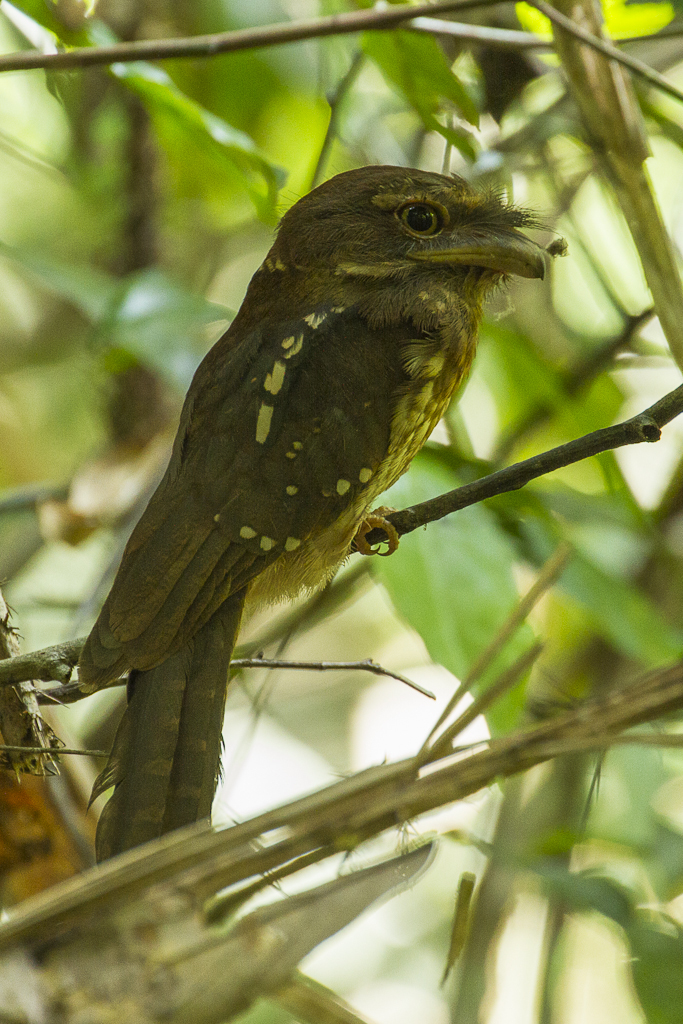

Conservation status
- Near Threatened (IUCN 3.1)

Scientific classification
- Kingdom: Animalia
- Phylum: Chordata
- Class: Aves
- Order: Podargiformes
- Family: Podargidae
- Genus: Batrachostomus
- Species: B. stellatus

Binomial name
- Batrachostomus stellatus (Gould, 1837)

= Gould's frogmouth =

Species of bird

Gould's frogmouth (Batrachostomus stellatus) is a nocturnal species of bird in the order Caprimulgiformes and the family Podargidae. It is one of the 12 species in the Batrachostomus genus. Its common name commemorates the English ornithologist and bird artist John Gould (1804–1881).

== Description ==
Gould's frogmouth is a medium-sized bird that will approximately weight 47 to 48.5 g and measure 21 to 25 cm. It can be seen in two different morphs. They both have the same patterns except that one is light and the other one is dark. They are mostly brown and have a white collar with some scattered white spots on the cover of the wings. The underparts have oval-shaped spots that appears whitish. Contrarily to the other frogmouths, the males and females are very similar. However, some differences arise which permit their identification. The females will have a darker reddish-brown color. Moreover, females have brown iris and yellowish legs while the males have yellow iris and pinkish legs.

== Distribution and habitat ==
This species is found solely in Southeast Asia. More precisely, it is found in Brunei, certain regions of Indonesia, Malaysia, Singapore, and in Southern Thailand. However, it is mostly present in Malaysia and Singapore. The habitat of Gould's frogmouths is tropical rainforest. They are mostly found in forest with native tree species that has not been disturbed by humans. This species usually lives in lowland forests, up to 500 metres elevation.

== Diet ==
Gould's frogmouths are insectivore like many other frogmouths in the area. They will feed on different types of moths, on certain beetles and on locusts.

== Reproduction ==
The breeding season can differ depending on the location of the birds. In the Malaysian area, it is from June to September and in Borneo it is from February to July. The incubation time is about 30 days and both parents will do the incubation. The nest is made with some of the parent's down and is usually small and shallow. Using some branches and lichens, the parents hide the nest to protect it from predators. The nests are mostly found at 1.3 m high and the females will lay one egg per clutch. The eggs have an oval shape and are white.

== Conservation status and threats ==
According to the IUCN, the Gould's frogmouth species is categorized as near threatened. Its population is continuously decreasing. This is due to the threats to its habitat. In Southern Thailand, there is a critical decline in the bird populations living in the lowland areas because the deforestation of the lowland forests by humans is destroying the habitat of different species. Therefore, Gould's frogmouth species is facing local extinction in Thailand. However, this species is spread in many different regions of Southeast Asia, so it reduces the risks of total extinction.
