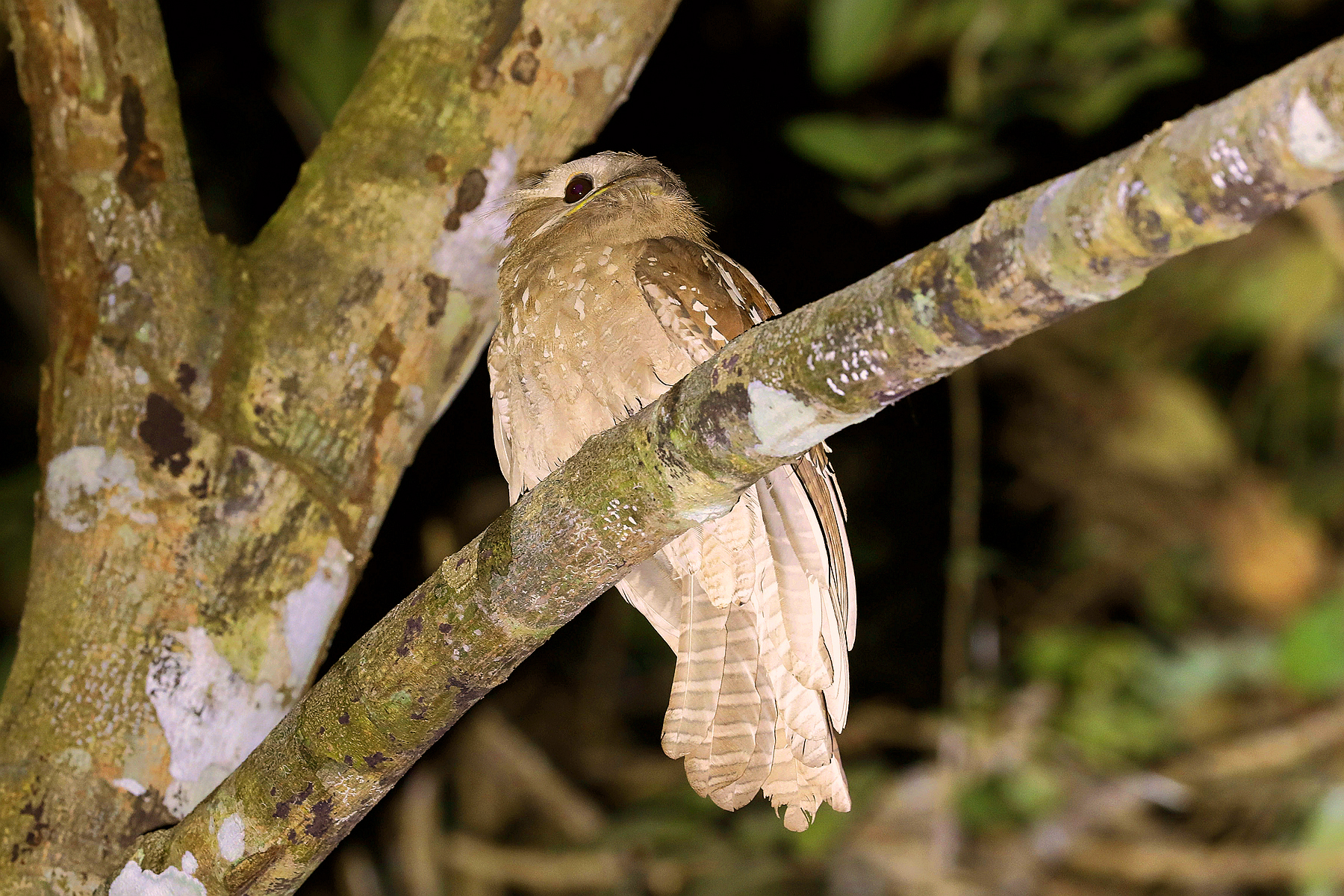

Conservation status
- Vulnerable (IUCN 3.1)

Scientific classification
- Kingdom: Animalia
- Phylum: Chordata
- Class: Aves
- Clade: Strisores
- Order: Podargiformes
- Family: Podargidae
- Genus: Batrachostomus
- Species: B. auritus

Binomial name
- Batrachostomus auritus (Gray, JE, 1829)

= Large frogmouth =

Species of bird

The large frogmouth (Batrachostomus auritus) is a species of bird in the family Podargidae. It is found in Brunei, Indonesia, Malaysia, and Thailand, in subtropical or tropical moist lowland forest. Logging of its habitat poses a risk to its survival, and the International Union for Conservation of Nature has listed it as a vulnerable species.

== Description ==
The large frogmouth is considerably larger than other members of its genus and grows to a length of about 42 cm (17 in). The sexes are similar and the colouring is rather variable, the upper parts being mainly chestnut and blackish-brown, barred and spotted with white and buff. The underparts are dull brown or pale rufous, the belly being paler than the breast. The beak is horn-coloured with a darker tip, the gape being yellow, the irises are some shade of light or dark brown, and the legs are a dull yellow.

== Distribution and habitat ==
The species occurs in Thailand, Malaysia, Indonesia and Brunei. Its range extends from southern Thailand, through Sabah, Sarawak and peninsular Malaysia to Kalimantan, Sumatra, Indonesia and Brunei. Its habitat is primary lowland forest, but it is also found in secondary forest and in areas of regenerating growth. It is found at elevations from sea level to at least 250 m, and perhaps to 1000 m.

== Ecology ==
The behaviour of this bird is not well known. It hunts by night, on the ground and in the canopy, feeding on insects such as grasshoppers and cicadas. It roosts by day, perching on a branch or hidden in a hole, singly or possibly in pairs. On one occasion an individual was mobbed by a greater racket-tailed drongo until it flew off into dense cover. Sings, mainly by night, from a perch in a tree, its voice being variously described as a repeated "deep hollow-sounding tremolo" or as a "series of four to eight loud, liquid trills".

The nest is firmly attached to a slender branch of a shrub or small tree. It consists of a circular cushion of down on which the single egg is balanced; the egg would fall off were it not for the incubating parent bird which crouches lengthwise along the branch rather than across it.

== Status ==
B. auritus is uncommon throughout most of its range. The total population is unknown, but the number of birds is likely to be decreasing in parallel with the destruction of lowland tropical forest throughout its range. The International Union for Conservation of Nature has assessed its conservation status as a vulnerable species.
