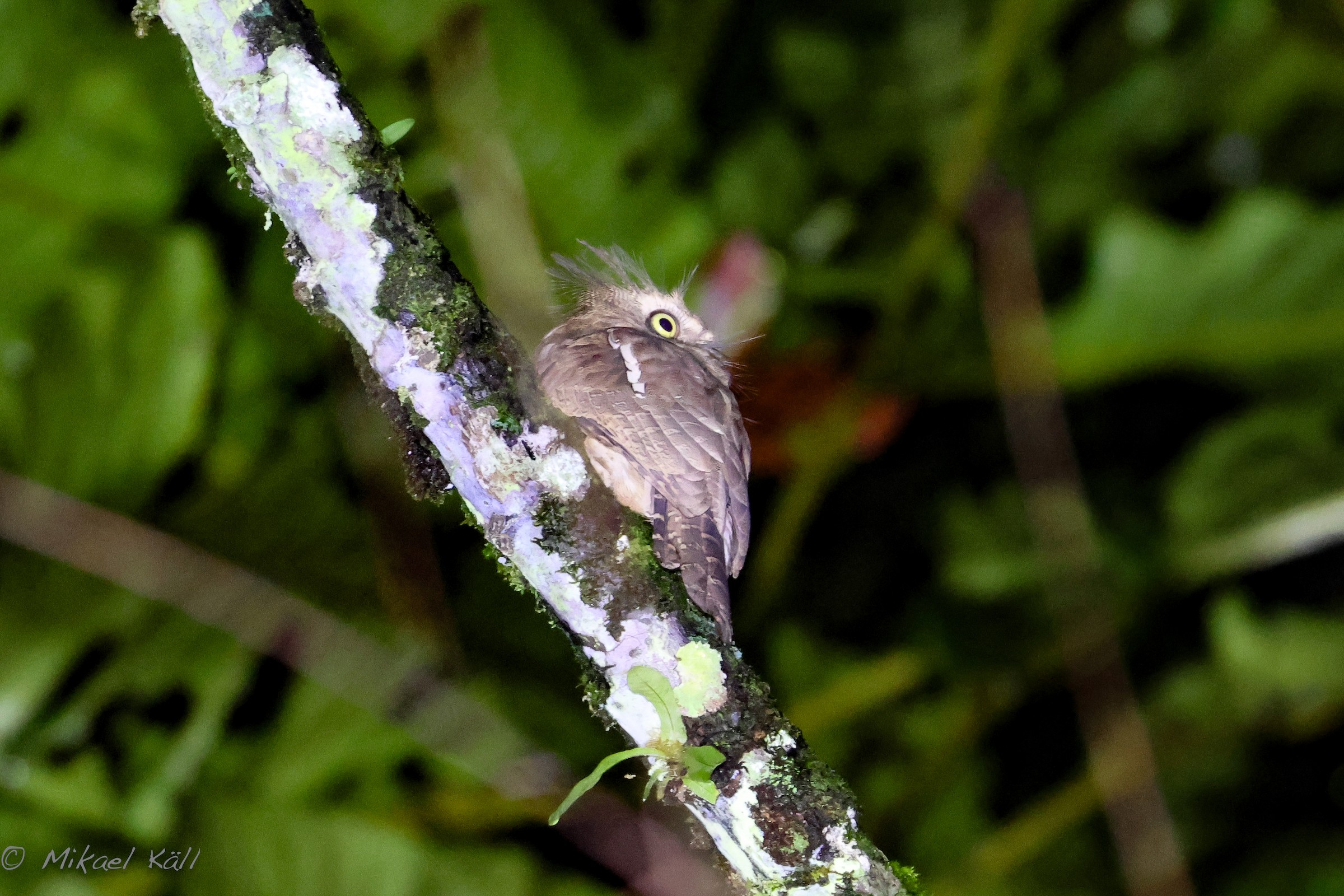

Conservation status
- Least Concern (IUCN 3.1)

Scientific classification
- Kingdom: Animalia
- Phylum: Chordata
- Class: Aves
- Order: Podargiformes
- Family: Podargidae
- Genus: Batrachostomus
- Species: B. mixtus

Binomial name
- Batrachostomus mixtus Sharpe, 1892

Synonyms
- Batrachostomus poliolophus mixtus

= Bornean frogmouth =

Species of bird

The Bornean frogmouth (Batrachostomus mixtus) is a bird species in the family Podargidae. Some taxonomists consider it to be a subspecies of the short-tailed frogmouth, but others consider it to be a distinct species. It is found in Indonesia and Malaysia and is endemic to the island of Borneo. Its natural habitats are subtropical or tropical moist lowland forest and subtropical or tropical moist montane forest. It is threatened by habitat loss.

The species was discovered by Charles Hose on Mount Dulit in Sarawak, Borneo, and described by Richard Bowdler Sharpe in 1892 for the Bulletin of the British Ornithologists' Club.
