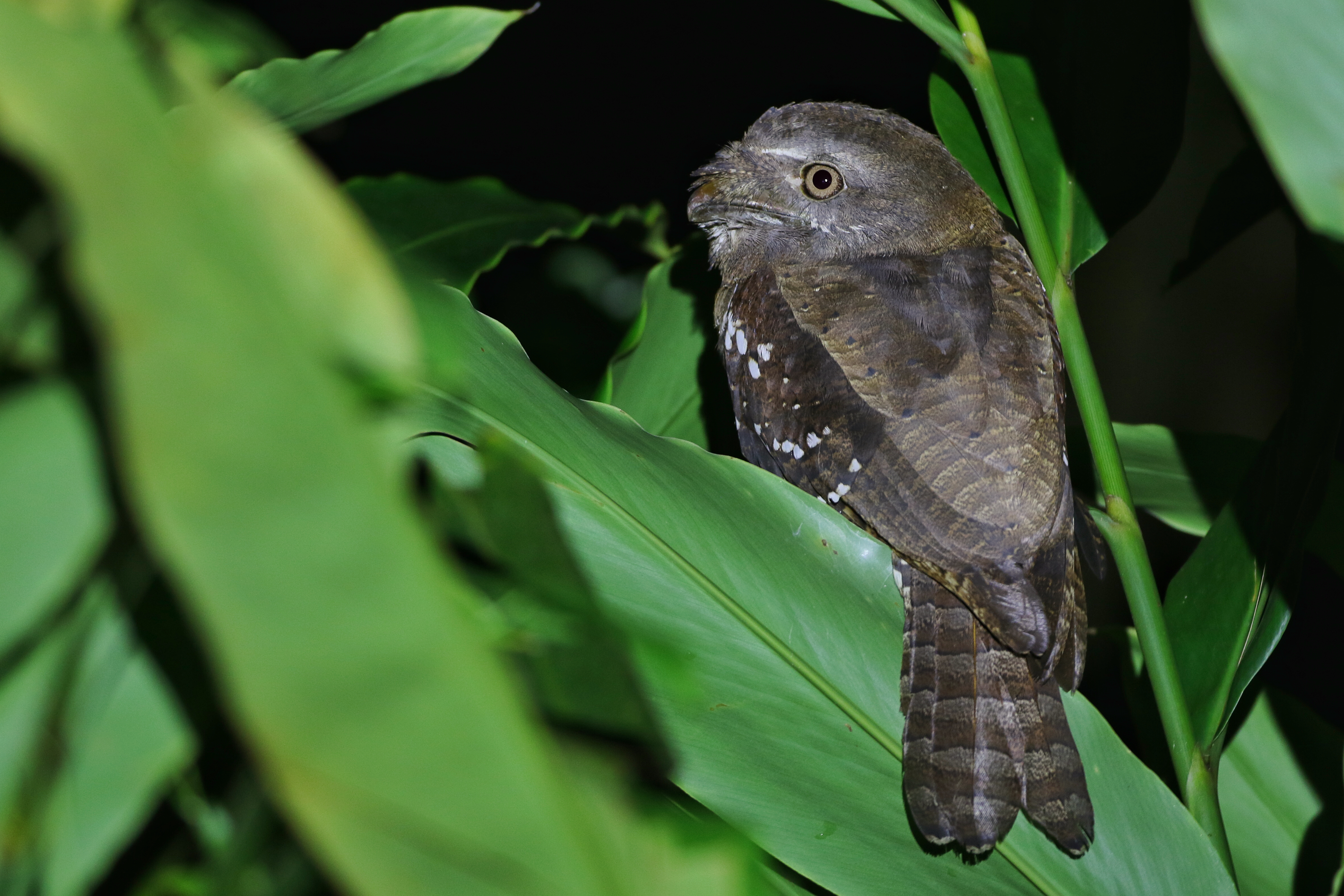

Conservation status
- Near Threatened (IUCN 3.1)

Scientific classification
- Kingdom: Animalia
- Phylum: Chordata
- Class: Aves
- Order: Podargiformes
- Family: Podargidae
- Genus: Rigidipenna; Cleere et al., 2007
- Species: R. inexpectata

Binomial name
- Rigidipenna inexpectata (Hartert, 1901)

Synonyms
- Podargus inexpectatus; Podargus ocellatus inexpectatus

= Solomons frogmouth =

Species of bird

The Solomons frogmouth (Rigidipenna inexpectata), also known as the Cinnamon frogmouth or Solomon Islands frogmouth, is a predatory bird in the frogmouth family. It was first described in 1901, but not recognized as a distinct species until 2007. The Solomons frogmouth is the only known member of the genus Rigidipenna. It is endemic to the islands of Isabel, Bougainville and Guadalcanal in the Solomon Islands archipelago, which lies in the countries of Papua New Guinea and the Solomon Islands.

== Description ==
When first encountered, the Solomons frogmouth was thought to be a subspecies of the Australian marbled frogmouth (Podargus ocellatus). However, an expedition by the Florida Museum of Natural History to Santa Isabel Island managed to collect a new specimen in 1998. Upon examination, the ornithologists Nigel Cleere, Andrew Kratter, together with paleontologist David Steadman, Michael Braun, Christopher Huddleston, evolutionary biologist Christopher Filardi, and ornithologist Guy Dutson realized that it was highly distinct from P. ocellatus. As a result of this apparent distinction, the Solomons frogmouth was moved to a newly-coined genus, Rigidipenna in 2007.

The Solomons frogmouth differs from other frogmouths in several ways. For instance, this species has only eight tail feathers instead of the more usual ten or twelve seen in other frogmouths, and the feathers are generally more coarse in texture. It also has barred primary feathers and tail feathers, larger speckles and more pronounced white spots. Storrs Olson, a senior zoologist at the Smithsonian Institution, has stated that the Solomons frogmouth's position as a new species "has profound biogeographical implications and represents a real breakthrough in elucidating the evolutionary history of the family."
