= Sumatran frogmouth =

Conservation status
- Least Concern (IUCN 3.1)

Scientific classification
- Kingdom: Animalia
- Phylum: Chordata
- Class: Aves
- Clade: Strisores
- Order: Podargiformes
- Family: Podargidae
- Genus: Batrachostomus
- Species: B. poliolophus

Binomial name
- Batrachostomus poliolophus Hartert, 1892

Species of bird

The Sumatran frogmouth (Batrachostomus poliolophus), also known as the short-tailed frogmouth and the pale-faced frogmouth, is a nocturnal bird belonging to the family Podargidae. It is endemic to the island of Sumatra in Indonesia.

== Description ==
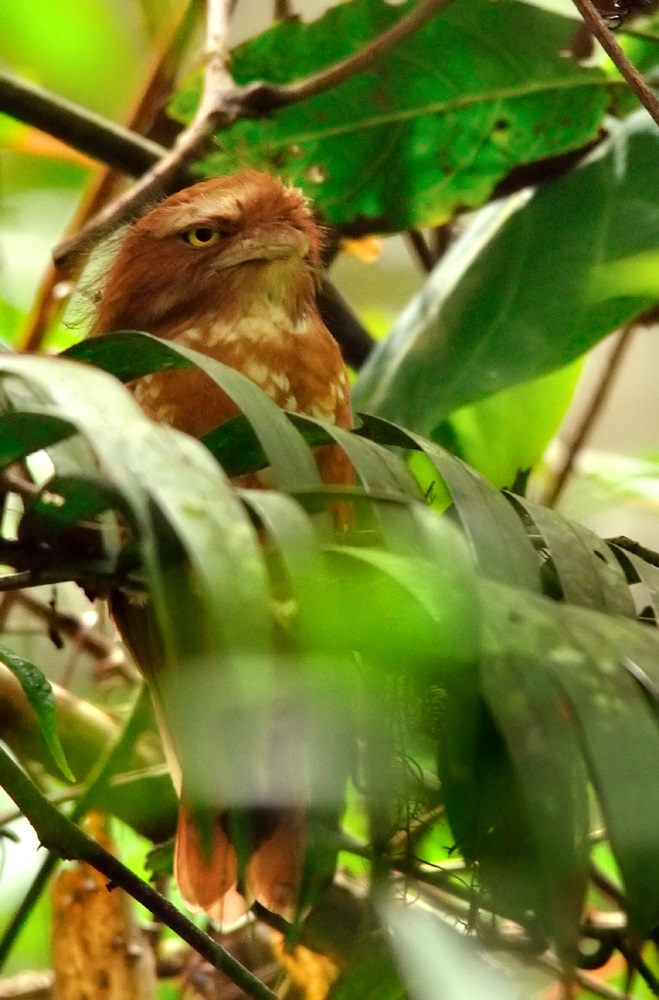
female

B. poliolophus has a large, arched bill with a light-brown to straw-yellow color. Its face is adorned with bristles, mainly on the forehead and ear coverts. It can be distinguished from other frogmouths by its tail, which is considerably shorter than its wings. It is sexually dimorphic. Males are mostly a dull dark brown with some black speckling and have a collar of white to pale buff feathers. Their underside is a lighter brown with black bars. A pattern of cream-buff spots covers the throat, sometimes extending to the breast and belly. The plumage of females is mainly rufous-brown with faint black barring. Unlike the males, the underside is generally of a similar color to the wings. The greater coverts and the upper breast sometimes exhibit white spots. The colar is variable, but generally similar to that of males.

== Taxonomy ==
This species is one of twelve others in its genus. The genus Batrachostomus is one of the three in the frogmouth family (Podargidae). The genus name is derived from the Greek for frog (batrakhos) and mouth (stoma). Poliolophus is Greek for "grey crest".

The Bornean frogmouth was once considered to be a subspecies of B. poliolophus.

== Habitat and distribution ==
This species is native to the Barisan mountains of the island of Sumatra. It is known to inhabit lowland and montane tropical forests with elevations ranging from 600 to 1200 meters.

== Behavior ==
Due to the rarity and nocturnal nature of this species, very few observations of its behavior have been published.

=== Vocalizations ===
The vocalization of this species has been described as an undulating whistling accompanied by 5–7 notes ("wa") with a descending pitch. Other calls include repeated and wavering "weeeow" notes, as well as a repeated, high pitched whistle sound ("tsiutsiu"). Some sources describe these vocalizations as having a wheezing or asthmatic quality.

=== Diet ===
This species is known to feed on insects such as crickets and small beetles.

=== Reproduction ===
The nest of B. poliolophus is described in one account as being very small relative to the size of the adult bird. The main material used in the construction of nests was parental down, as well as organic matter such as lichen or moss. The clutch consisted of a single, white egg of an oval shape. This species has a generation time of 7.5 years.

== Threats and conservation ==
The Sumatran frogmouth is listed as Least Concern according to the IUCN. Though the global population has not yet been measured, it is suspected to be declining at a moderate rate. The main threat to this species is habitat loss caused by the deforestation of lowland forests on Sumatra. This is less of an issue in the higher-elevation montane forests that make up a part of its habitat.
