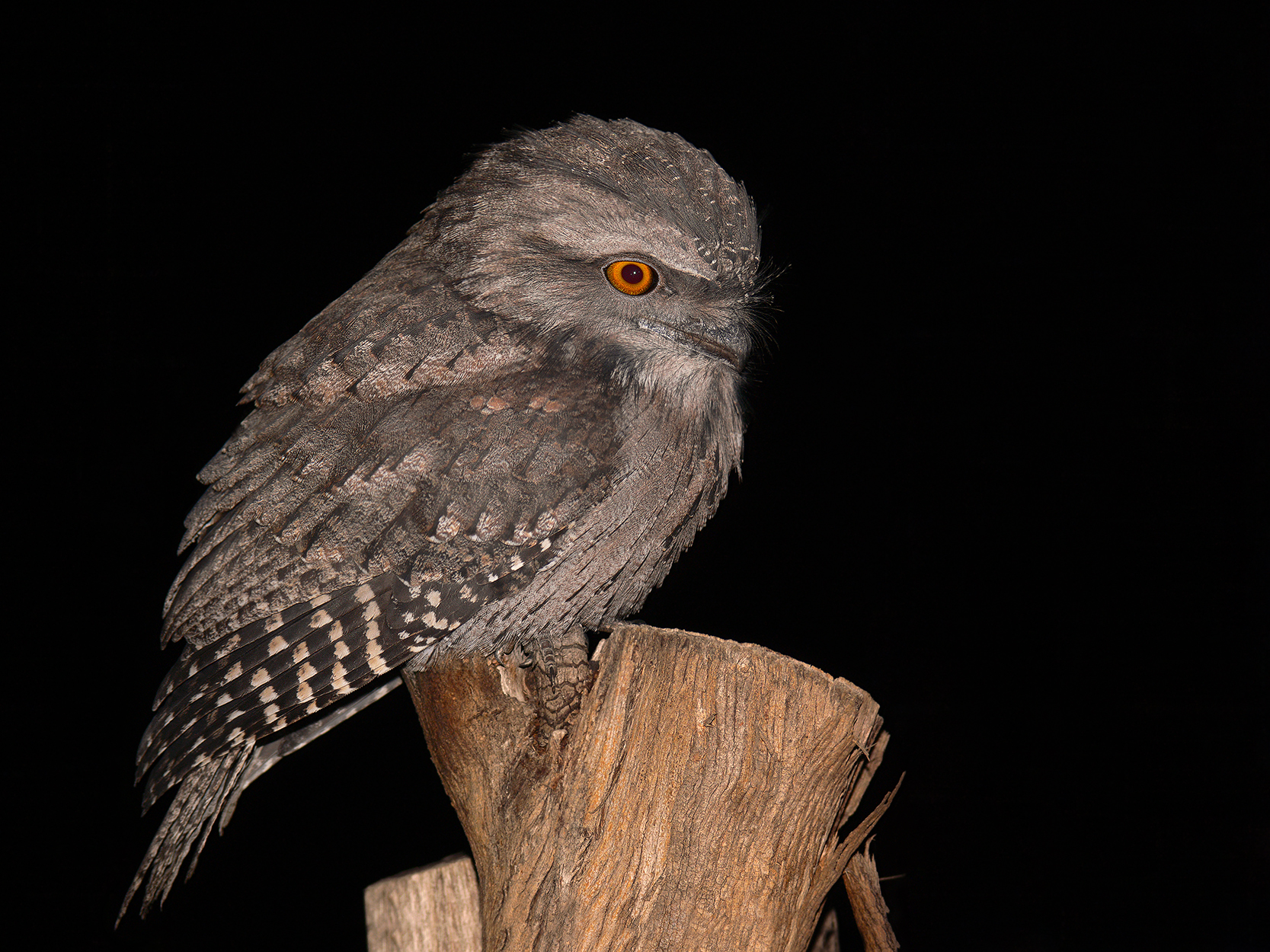
- Tawny frogmouth, Podargus strigoides, at night

Scientific classification
- Kingdom: Animalia
- Phylum: Chordata
- Class: Aves
- Order: Podargiformes
- Family: Podargidae
- Genus: Podargus; Vieillot, 1818

Type species
- Podargus cinereus Vieillot, 1818

Species
- At least 3 recognized species, see article.

= Podargus =

Genus of birds

Podargus is a small genus of birds in the frogmouth family, Podargidae. All members of this genus are found in Australia, with some species being found in Papua New Guinea, Indonesia, and the Solomon Islands, as well.
It contains these species to date:

Image	Scientific name	Common name	Distribution
	Podargus ocellatus Quoy & Gaimard, 1830	Marbled frogmouth	Aru Islands, New Guinea and Queensland
	Podargus papuensis Quoy & Gaimard, 1830	Papuan frogmouth	Aru Islands, New Guinea, and Cape York Peninsula.
	Podargus strigoides (Latham, 1801)	Tawny frogmouth	Mainland Australia (except far Western Queensland, the central Northern Territory, and most of the Nullarbor Plain) and Tasmania
