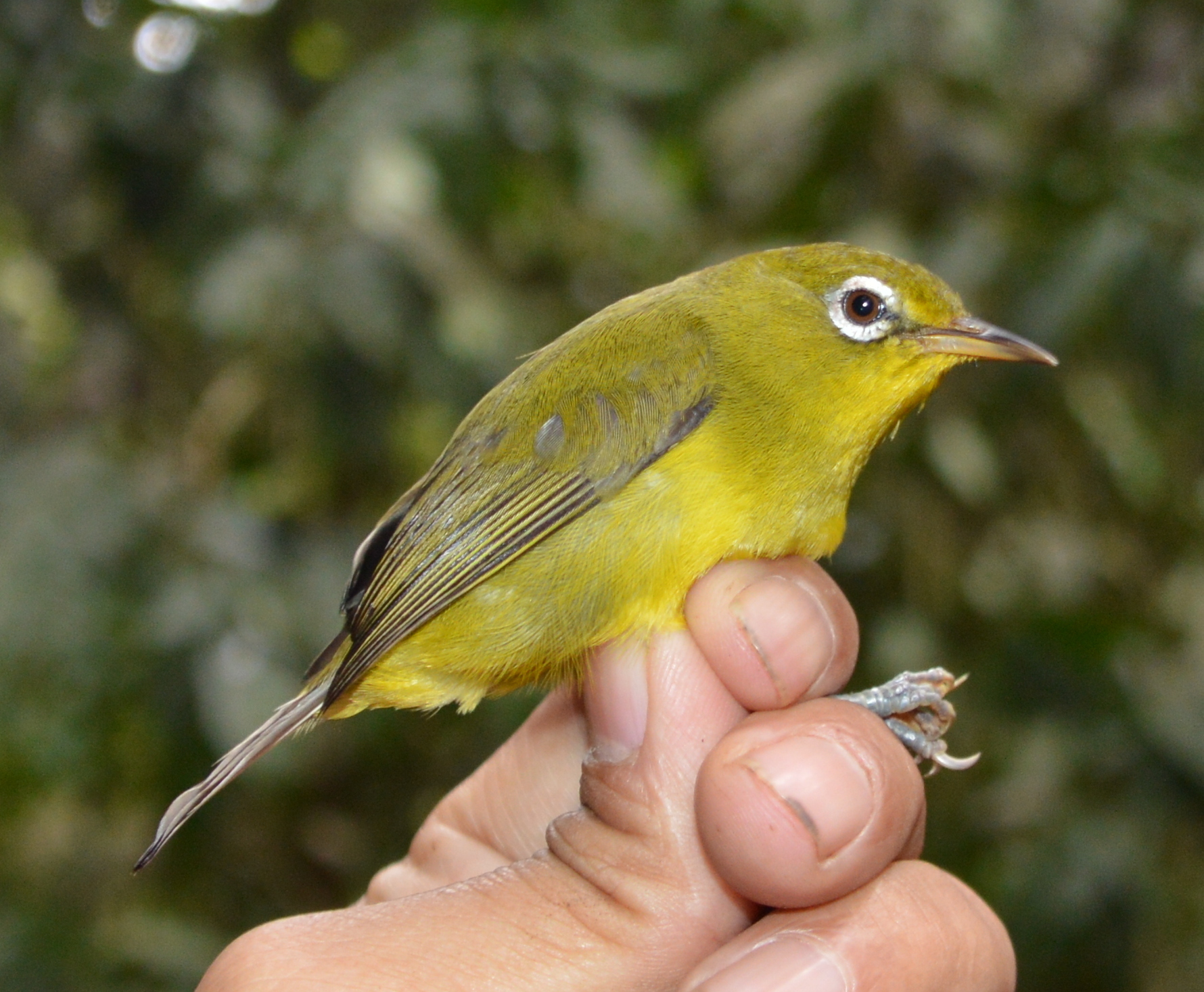
- Holotype male

Conservation status
- Least Concern (IUCN 3.1)

Scientific classification
- Kingdom: Animalia
- Phylum: Chordata
- Class: Aves
- Order: Passeriformes
- Family: Zosteropidae
- Genus: Zosterops
- Species: Z. meratusensis

Binomial name
- Zosterops meratusensis Irham, Haryoko, Shakya, Mitchell, S, Burner, Bocos, Eaton, Rheindt, Suparno, Sheldon & Prawiradilaga, 2021

= Meratus white-eye =

Species of bird

The Meratus white-eye (Zosterops meratusensis) is a species of bird in the white-eye family, Zosteropidae. The species was described in 2021 by the Indonesian ornithologist Mohammed Irham and his colleagues based on genetic, morphological, and vocal differences from other Zosterops white-eyes. It is endemic to the Meratus Mountains of Indonesian Borneo, where it has been observed on Mount Besar and Mount Karokangen. It inhabits the mid and lower storeys of closed-canopy montane forests at elevations between 1,300 and 1,650 m (4,270 and 5,410 ft). It is a typical Zosterops white-eye, with deep olive-green upperparts, yellower underparts, a yellow stripe across the lores, and a distinctive bicoloured bill. Adults have a length of around 11–12 cm (4.3–4.7 in) and a mass of 8.5–9.5 g (0.30–0.34 oz). Both sexes look alike.

Most aspects of the Meratus white-eye's ecology are unknown. It has it has been seen in mixed-species foraging flocks with other insectivores. Its breeding is also poorly studied, but presumed juveniles have been seen in the second week of July. The species is classified as being of least-concern by the International Union for Conservation of Nature (IUCN) on the IUCN Red List. It is thought to be locally common within the small area it inhabits and is not currently threatened, although the songbird trade may represent a future threat. Recommended conservation measures for the species include surveys to accurately estimate its population, finding the demand for the species in the songbird trade, and finding suitable tracts of habitat to protect.

== Taxonomy ==
The Meratus Mountains of southeastern Borneo are a small isolated patch of montane forest, surrounded by heavily degraded lowland habitats and separated from Borneo's main mountain range by a distance of around 300 km (190 mi). These mountains have high levels of endemism, but have been poorly studied ornithologically, with few expeditions having studied the birds of the region. Zosterops white-eyes representing a previously unknown species were first documented from the mountain range in July 2016; specimens of the species were collected the next year by an expedition of the Bogor Zoology Museum and the Louisiana State University Museum of Natural Science. The Meratus white-eye was probably previously seen during a 1996 expedition by the British ornithologist Geoffrey Davison, although he identified his sightings as black-capped white-eyes.

The species was described in 2021 as Zosterops meratusensis by the Indonesian ornithologist Mohammed Irham and his colleagues on the basis of an adult male specimen collected from Mount Besar in 2017. This description was based on genetic, morphological, and vocal differences from other Zosterops white-eyes. It was described alongside the Meratus blue flycatcher, another species that was first recorded in 2016. The name of the genus, Zosterops, is derived from the Ancient Greek words zōstēr, meaning 'belt' or 'girdle', and ōps, meaning 'eye'. The specific epithet is named after the Meratus Mountains that are the species' type locality. 'Meratus white-eye' is the official common name designated by the International Ornithologists' Union (IOU). In Indonesian, it is called Kacamata Meratus.

The Meratus white-eye is one of over 100 species currently placed in the genus Zosterops, in the white-eye family, Zosteropidae. It has no subspecies. It is most closely related to the lemon-bellied and Wakatobi white-eyes.

== Description ==
The Meratus white-eye is a typical Zosterops white-eye with deep olive-green upperparts, more yellow underparts, a yellow stripe across the lores, and a distinctive bicoloured bill. Adults have a length of around 11–12 cm (4.3–4.7 in) and a mass of 8.5–9.5 g (0.30–0.34 oz). The wing length is 48.7–50.8 mm (1.92–2.00 in), the length of the bill is 35 mm (1.4 in), and the tail length is 12.5–13.7 mm (0.49–0.54 in). The species shows no sexual dimorphism; males and females both look alike.

The eye-ring is white, broken in the front by a narrow black loral line that continues below the eye-ring, and may be widest below the eye. There is a narrow olive-yellow streak above the loral line. The upperparts are mostly uniform yellowish olive-green, with blackish streaks on the top of the head. The flight feathers are dusky brown with yellow to greenish olive edges. The throat is somewhat streaky yellow, turning more olive-yellow on the breast, and the belly is yellow-orange tinted yellow. The flanks and thighs are yellowish olive-green and olive-yellow. The exact amount of yellow on the underside varies between individuals.The uppertail-coverts are between yellowish olive-green to citrine and brighter than the rest of the upperside. The undertail-coverts are sulfur yellow with an orange-yellow that increases towards the tip, while the tail is dusky brown with paler edges. The bill is mostly pinkish-horn, with the upper ridge of the maxilla and the tip of the mandible being a darker greyish-horn. This appears conspicuous in the field, with the pinkish-orange mandible contrasting with its greyish tip and the darker grey maxilla. The iris is dark brown and the feet are grayish-horn or steel-grey, with paler toe pads. Individuals thought to be juveniles have paler, duller bills and may also have thinner eye-rings with a post-ocular gap.

The only other species of white-eye that also occurs in the Meratus Mountains is Hume's white-eye, which is much alike to the Meratus white-eye in terms of structure and dimensions. That species has brighter green upperparts, yellow chin and throat, a yellow stripe down the underparts that contrasts the surrounding soft gray, and a monochromatic bill. Additionally, Hume's white-eye is found at lower elevations than the Meratus white-eye. The three other montane white-eyes found on Borneo, the black-capped white-eye, pygmy white-eye, and mountain blackeye, do not overlap in range with the Meratus white-eye. They can also be easily differentiated from the Meratus white-eye by the latter's uniform yellowish-olive colouration and white eye-ring.

The Javan white-eye is the only other Bornean white-eye that is uniformly yellow or olive. Compared to that species, the Meratus white-eye is darker overall, has a longer bill and tail, and has a thinner, less yellowish line above the lores. The lemon-bellied white-eye, found on small offshore islands off Borneo, and the Wakatobi white-eye, found on offshore islands off southwestern Sulawesi, are a much brighter yellow than the Meratus white-eye's deep olive-green appearance.

=== Vocalisations ===
The song of the Meratus white-eye is one to three second long "warbling series of high-pitched short notes, ending with a faster, lower-pitched jumble". The white-eye's usual call is a high, "buzzy" zip. Spectrograms of the songs of Meratus and lemon-bellied white-eyes show the Meratus white-eye's calls being consistently higher-pitched and having shorter "phrases". Songs are mostly given early in the morning at daybreak.

== Distribution and habitat ==
The species is endemic to the Meratus Mountains in Indonesian Borneo, where it has been recorded from Mount Besar and Mount Karokangen. It inhabits the mid and lower storeys of closed-canopy montane forests and has been recorded above 1,300 m (4,300 ft). Its upper elevational range is not known for certain; the highest point in its range is 1,901 m (6,237 ft) on Mount Besar, but Meratus white-eyes have only been observed up to 1,600–1,650 m (5,250–5,410 ft). The species is assumed to be non-migratory.

== Ecology and conservation ==
Most aspects of the Meratus white-eye's ecology are unknown. Its diet is unknown, but it has it has been seen in mixed-species foraging flocks with other insectivores. Foraging takes place in the lower and middle stories of the forest, with white-eyes probing the underside of moss hanging from twigs and petioles while hanging upside-down. Flocks of Meratus white-eyes can have up to 40 birds. No information on breeding is known, but presumed juveniles have been seen in the second week of July.

The Meratus white-eye is classified as being of least-concern by the International Union for Conservation of Nature (IUCN) on the IUCN Red List. It has a very small range. The authors describing the species recommended it be assessed as vulnerable due to its restricted distribution and pressure on its population due to the songbird trade. The species' abundance has not been formally quantified, but it is thought to be locally common within the small area it inhabits. Although low-elevation forest in the Meratus white-eye's range has been heavily deforested, the species does not occur below 1,300 m (4,300 ft), so habitat loss within its habitat is likely negligible in the decade before 2022. Consequently, the species' population is thought to be stable. However, forests inhabited by the species are likely disturbed at moderate levels by humans harvesting forest products.

The species is also threatened by the Indonesian trade in songbirds, having first been recorded from local songbird markets in 2021. Although this threat is not currently considered very severe, other Zosterops white-eyes have been popular in Indonesia and consequently the species requires monitoring. Anecdotal reports from the Meratus Mountains have found that increasing ecotourism for birdwatching in the region may reduce incentives to poach birds.

The species is not protected by Indonesian law and does not occur in any protected areas; its range overlaps with a single protected area, the Pleihari Martapura Wildlife Reserve, which does not cover its altitudinal range. The Meratus Mountains it inhabits are designated as an Important Bird Area by BirdLife International. Recommended conservation measures for the species include surveys to accurately estimate its population, finding the demand for the species in the songbird trade, and finding suitable tracts of habitat to protect.

== See also ==
- List of bird species described in the 2020s
