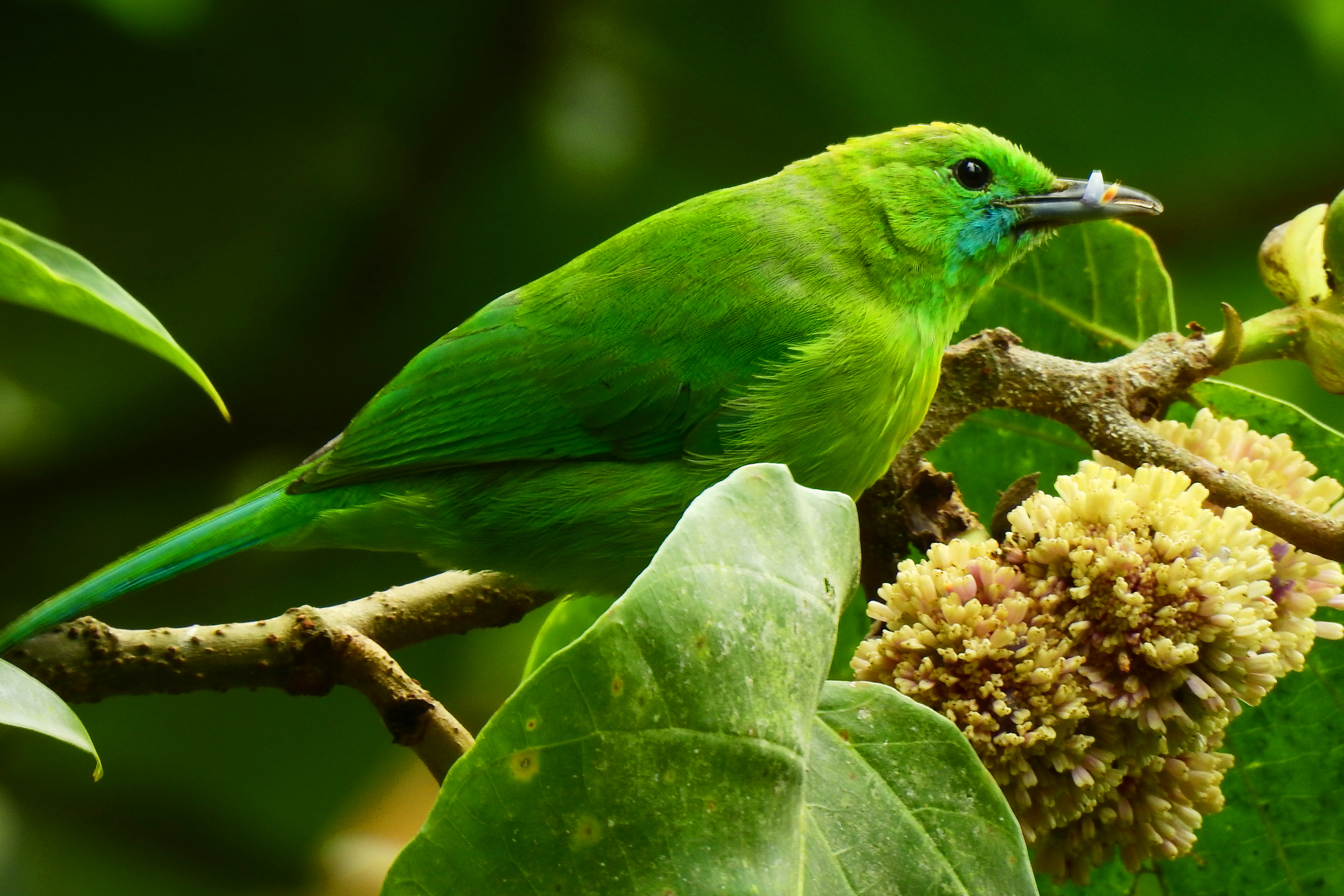
- Female

Conservation status
- Endangered (IUCN 3.1)

Scientific classification
- Kingdom: Animalia
- Phylum: Chordata
- Class: Aves
- Order: Passeriformes
- Family: Chloropseidae
- Genus: Chloropsis
- Species: C. cochinchinensis

Binomial name
- Chloropsis cochinchinensis (Gmelin, JF, 1789)

= Javan leafbird =

Species of bird

The Javan leafbird (Chloropsis cochinchinensis) is a species of leafbird found in old-growth and second growth forests in Java. It was formerly considered as conspecific with the widespread blue-winged leafbird.

== Taxonomy ==
The Javan leafbird was formally described in 1789 by the German naturalist Johann Friedrich Gmelin in his revised and expanded edition of Carl Linnaeus's Systema Naturae. He placed it with the thrushes in the genus Turdus and coined the binomial name Turdus cochinchinensis. Gmelin based his account on "Le verdin de la Cochinchine" that had been described in 1775 by the French polymath Georges-Louis Leclerc, Comte de Buffon in his multi-volume work Histoire Naturelle des Oiseaux. A hand-coloured engraving by François-Nicolas Martinet was published separately to accompany Buffon's text. Cochinchina is a historical name for Vietnam. The Javan leafbird is now one of 12 leafbirds placed in the genus Chloropsis that was introduced in 1827 by William Jardine & Prideaux Selby. It was formerly considered to be conspecific with the blue-winged leafbird (Chloropsis moluccensis).

== Status ==
The species is endangered largely due to overexploitation for the Asian songbird trade. Although leafbirds were a moderately popular choice of cage birds for many years, the popularity of leafbirds skyrocketed in recent years after the greater green leafbird (C. sonnerati) became exceptionally sought after. As the Javan leafbird is a primarily lowland-dwelling species, it is at high risk of severe overexploitation as its entire range is accessible to trappers. There have been reports of loss of C. cochinchinensis from previously occupied sites while the habitat remains unchanged, indicating the risks that trapping poses to the species.
