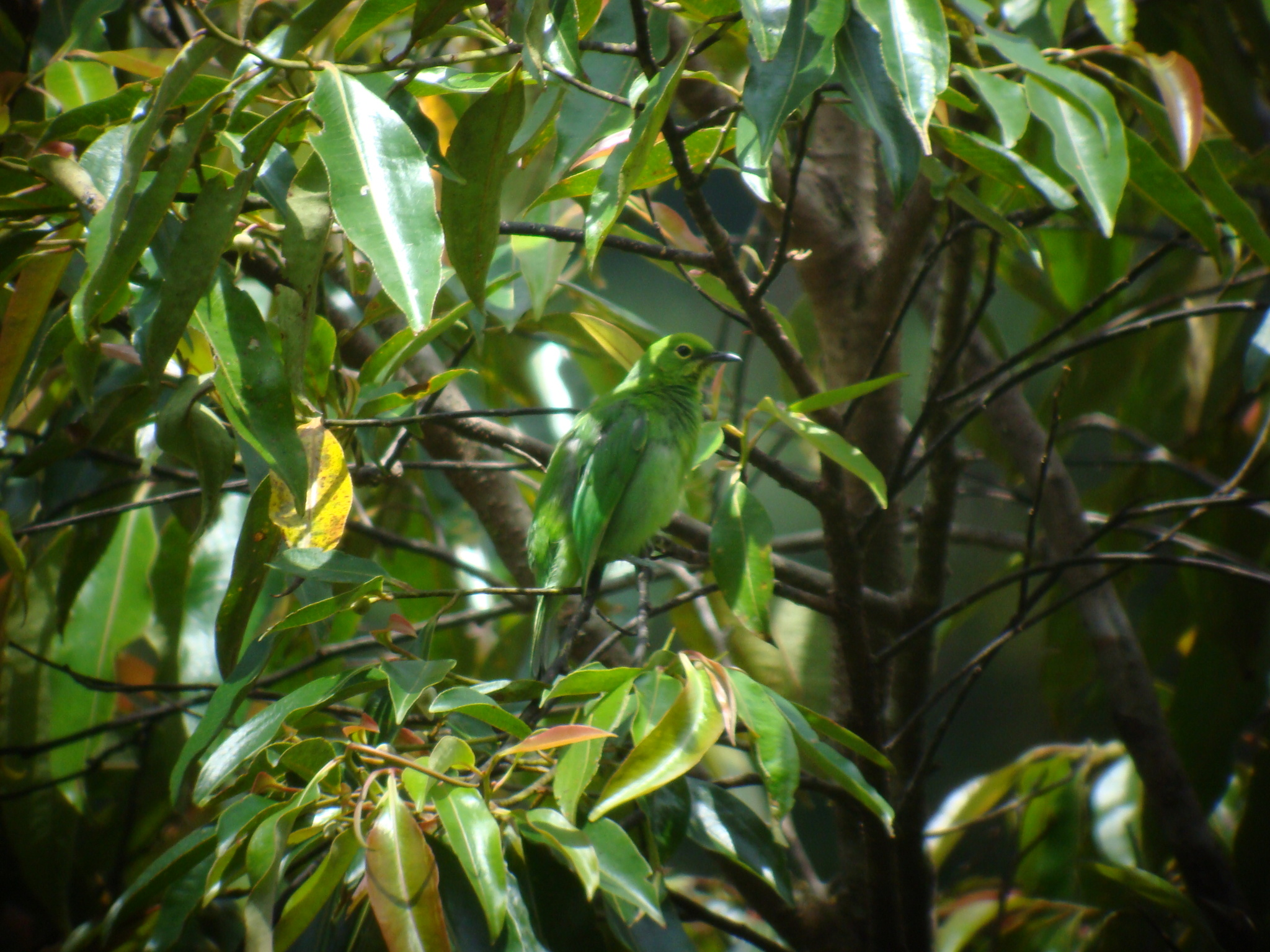

Conservation status
- Endangered (IUCN 3.1)

Scientific classification
- Kingdom: Animalia
- Phylum: Chordata
- Class: Aves
- Order: Passeriformes
- Family: Chloropseidae
- Genus: Chloropsis
- Species: C. media

Binomial name
- Chloropsis media (Bonaparte, 1850)

Synonyms
- Chloropsis aurifrons media

= Sumatran leafbird =

Species of bird

The Sumatran leafbird (Chloropsis media) is a species of bird in the family Chloropseidae. It is endemic to forest and plantations in Sumatra in Indonesia. It has often been included as a subspecies of the golden-fronted leafbird (C. aurifrons), but the two differ extensively in, among others, morphology, with the male of the Sumatran leafbird having a yellow (not deep orange) forehead, and the female resembling a female blue-winged leafbird, but with a yellowish forecrown and no blue to the wings and tail (very different from the golden-fronted leafbird, where the male and female are very similar).
