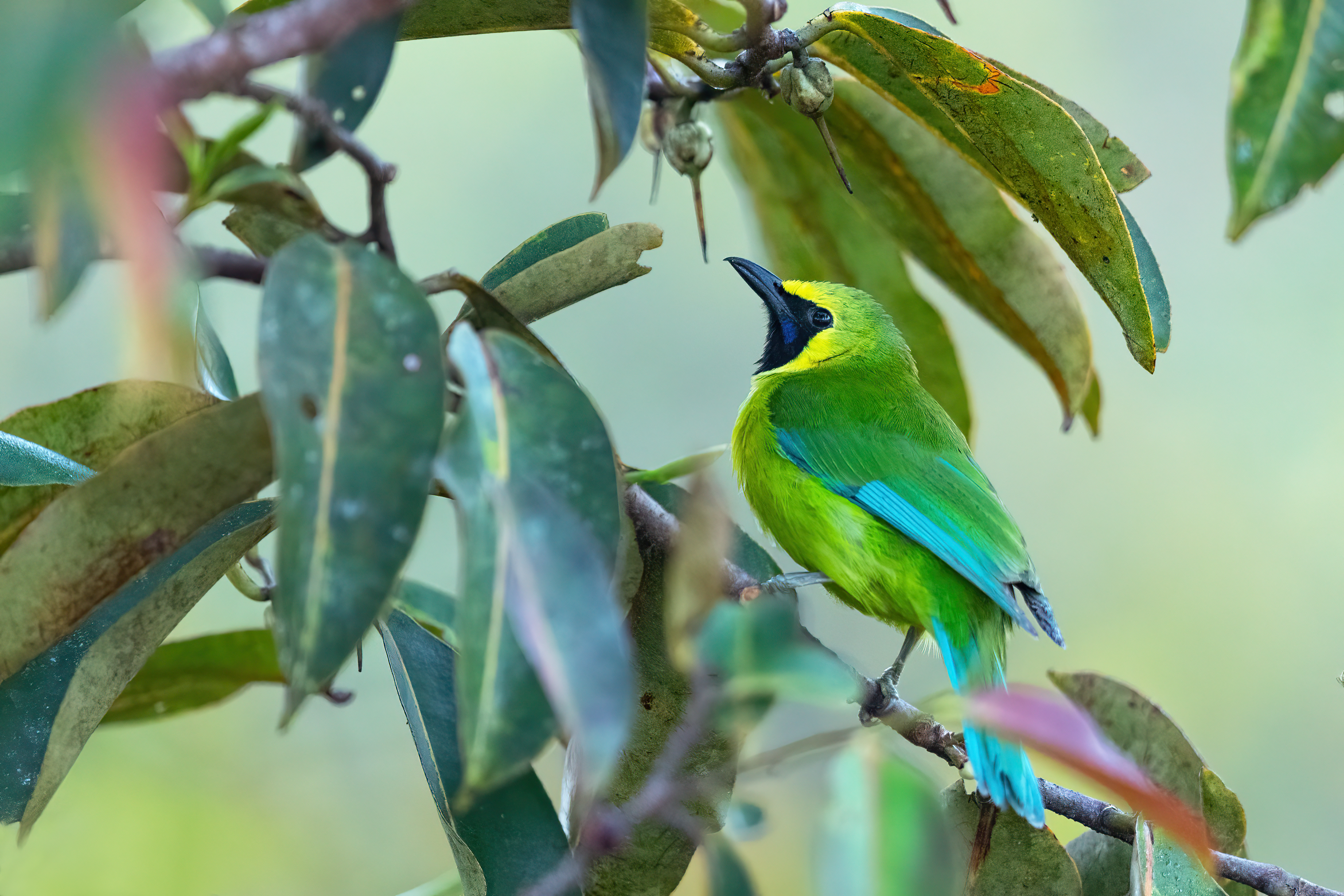

Conservation status
- Least Concern (IUCN 3.1)

Scientific classification
- Kingdom: Animalia
- Phylum: Chordata
- Class: Aves
- Order: Passeriformes
- Family: Chloropseidae
- Genus: Chloropsis
- Species: C. kinabaluensis

Binomial name
- Chloropsis kinabaluensis Sharpe, 1887

Synonyms
- * Chloropsis cochinchinensis kinabaluensis; * Chloropsis cochinchinensis flavocincta

= Bornean leafbird =

Species of bird

The Bornean leafbird (Chloropsis kinabaluensis), also known as the Kinabalu leafbird, is a species of bird in the family Chloropseidae. It is found in humid forest in Borneo, to which it is endemic (elevated areas, including the Meratus Mountains). It has traditionally been considered a subspecies of the blue-winged leafbird (C. cochinchinensis), but differ in measurements and morphology, the female Bornean leafbird having a distinctive male-like plumage. The distribution of the two are known to approach each other, but there is no evidence of intergradation.
