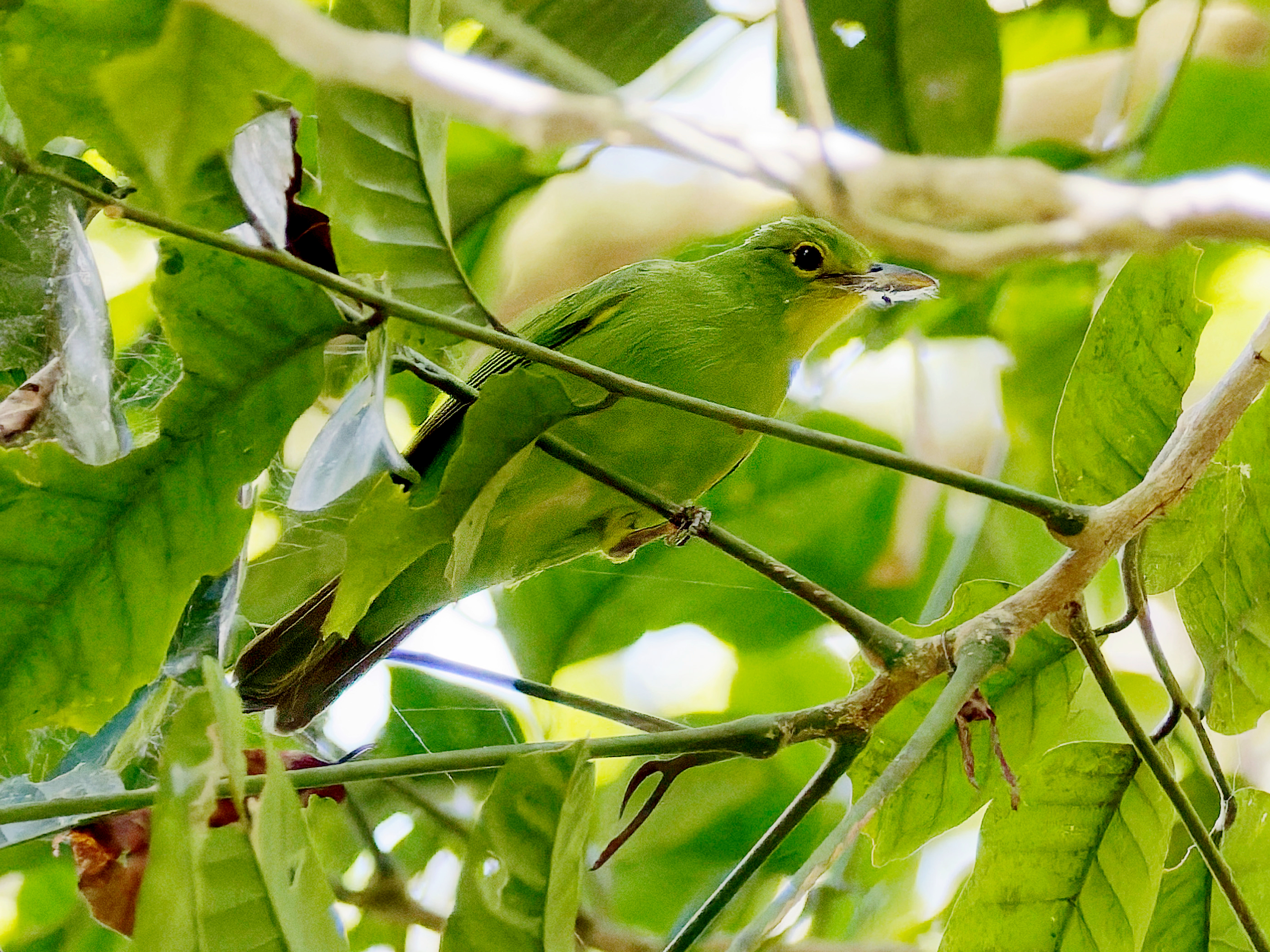
- In Samar Island Natural Park
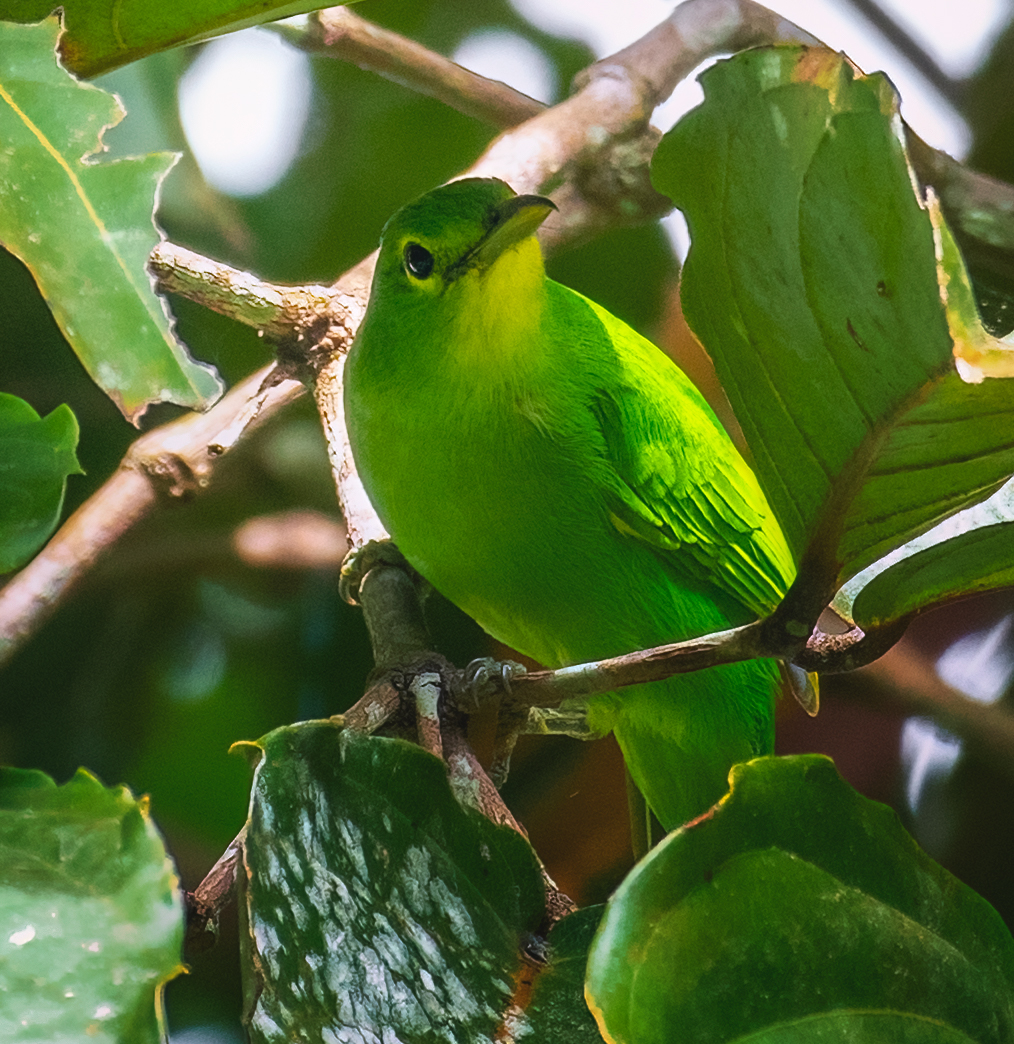
- In Misamis Oriental

Conservation status
- Vulnerable (IUCN 3.1)

Scientific classification
- Kingdom: Animalia
- Phylum: Chordata
- Class: Aves
- Order: Passeriformes
- Family: Chloropseidae
- Genus: Chloropsis
- Species: C. flavipennis

Binomial name
- Chloropsis flavipennis (Tweeddale, 1878)

= Philippine leafbird =

Species of bird

The Philippine leafbird (Chloropsis flavipennis) is a species of bird in the family Chloropseidae. It is endemic to the Philippines. It is found in the islands of Mindanao, Leyte, Samar and Cebu. Its natural habitat is tropical moist lowland forest. It is threatened by habitat loss.

Its stronghold is believed to be Mindanao. It has not been seen on Cebu since the 1920s and is likely extinct, and Leyte in 1973 although much of its habitat on this island has not been surveyed. Birds of the World lists the last verified records in Samar as 1964 but has been listed in eBird in 2023 and was photographed in 2025 and 2026. There are also claims of them being on Bohol but these are not verified.

== Description and taxonomy ==
It is most similar to the other leafbird in the Philippines, the Yellow-throated leafbird of Palawan. However, these birds do not overlap in range. These birds are differentiated by the Philippine leafbird being more plain green and larger at around 18-19 cm in length vs the former's 16-18cm. Molecular studies have also shown that after the Yellow-throated leafbird it is also closely related to the Lesser green leafbird.

This species is now monotypic but birds from Northeast Mindano were once assigned as the subspecies mindanensis but birds from these areas are inseparable in appearance.

== Ecology and behavior ==
It forages in high canopies feeding flowering and fruiting trees. It has also been observed feeding on insects but otherwise dietary data is mostly unknown.

Its breeding habits are essentially unknown aside from a nest seen on Leyte in August and enlarged gonads reported in specimens collected in April and May.

== Habitat and conservation status ==
Its natural habitats at tropical moist lowland primary forest and well developed secondary forest up to 970 meters above sea level. It appears to not be able to tolerate great amounts of forest degradation. It is known to forage in the upper levels of the forest in the canopy.

IUCN has assessed this bird as vulnerable with the population being estimated at 600 to 1.700. Extensive lowland deforestation on all islands in its range is the main threat. Most remaining lowland forest that is not afforded protection leaving it vulnerable to both legal and Illegal logging, conversion into farmlands through Slash-and-burn and mining. Most Ebird and sight observations are in the PICOP Logging Concession in Agusan del Sur and Surigao del Sur, since the closure of PICOP, illegal settlers have massively deforested the area for illegal hardwoods and have been replanting cleared areas with paper pulp trees which do cannot support these birds.

It occurs in the protected area of Pasonanca Natural Park and possibly Samar Island Natural Park but enforcement and protection from loggers is lax.

Conservation actions proposed are to survey remaining lowland forest tracts on Samar, Leyte and in poorly known areas of Mindanao, to establish its current distribution and population status. This species was reported by multiple observers in Samar in 2023 and 2024 and it is recommended that these records be verified. Following these surveys, Propose key sitesfor urgent establishment as protected areas. Study the habitat requirements of the species, with particular reference to the extent of reliance on primary forest habitats.
