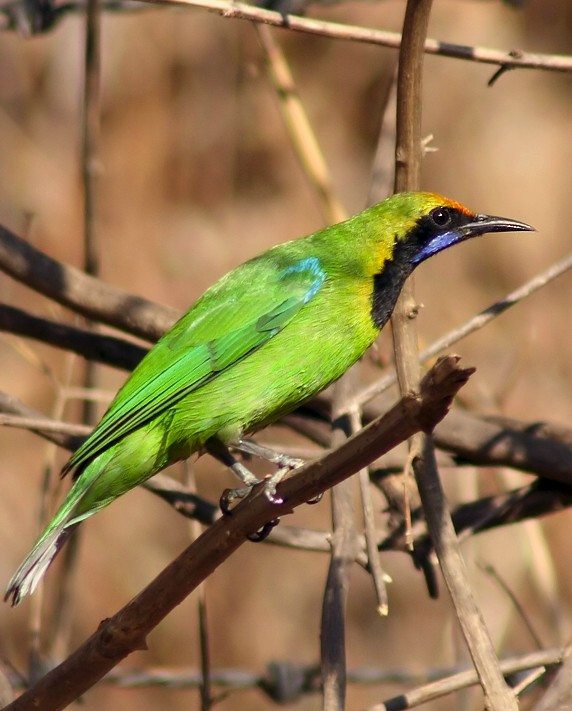

Conservation status
- Least Concern (IUCN 3.1)

Scientific classification
- Kingdom: Animalia
- Phylum: Chordata
- Class: Aves
- Order: Passeriformes
- Family: Chloropseidae
- Genus: Chloropsis
- Species: C. aurifrons

Binomial name
- Chloropsis aurifrons (Temminck, 1829)

= Golden-fronted leafbird =

Species of bird

The golden-fronted leafbird (Chloropsis aurifrons) is a species of leafbird. It is found from the Indian subcontinent and south-western China, to south-east Asia and Sumatra.

It builds its nest in a tree, laying 2-3 eggs. This species eats insects and berries.

== Taxonomy and systematics ==
Formerly, the Sumatran leafbird was considered as a subspecies, but the two differ extensively in morphology and other characteristics.

== Description ==
The adult is green-bodied with a black face and throat bordered with yellow. It has dark brown irises and blackish feet and bill. It has a yellowish orange forehead and blue moustachial line (but lacks the blue flight feathers and tail sides of blue-winged leafbird). Young birds have a plain green head and lack the black on their face and throat. The black of the face and throat appears slightly duller in females.

The southern Indian race, C. a. frontalis, has a narrower yellow border to black face. The throat is black and it has a blue sub-moustachial stripe and duller orange forehead. Towards the extreme south of India and Sri Lanka the race insularis occurs which is slightly smaller than frontalis.

== Distribution and habitat ==
The golden-fronted leafbird is a common resident breeder in India, Bangladesh, Sri Lanka, and parts of Southeast Asia. Widely distributed in India, Bangladesh, Bhutan, Myanmar, Thailand, Cambodia, Laos, Vietnam, and Indonesia; typically inhabiting dense forest canopies, deciduous forests, woodlands, and scrublands. Also frequently found in wooded gardens and plantations.

== Behaviour and ecology ==
The golden-fronted leafbird builds its nest in a tree, laying 2-3 eggs. This species eats insects and berries. They are highly acrobatic, often clinging to twigs upside down in the canopy to glean insects and spiders. They also feed on nectar and berries. Often imitates the calls of various birds, including the Tailor-bird, Black Drongo, and Common Iora. Songs are melodic, high-pitched, and whistling, rising and falling liquid chirps in bulbul-like tones and its call may include harsh whispers, often delivered from the top of a tree. Generally found in pairs or small groups of up to 8, sometimes joining mixed-species foraging flocks.

== Gallery ==
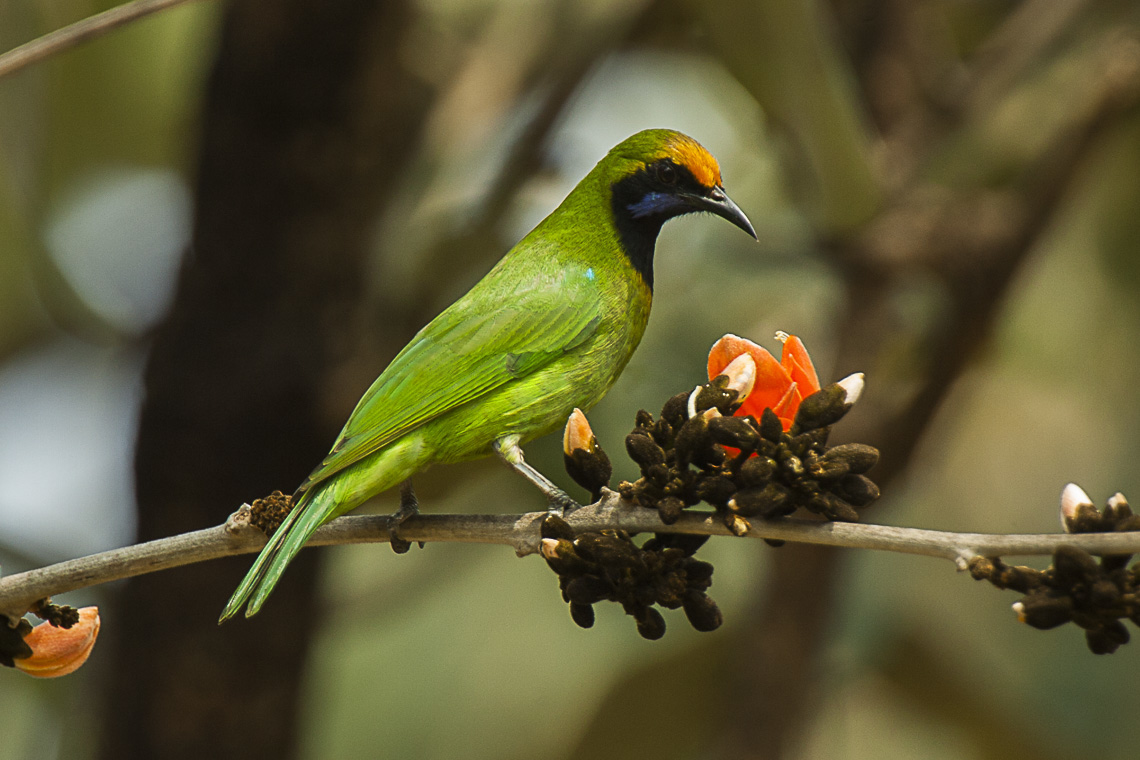
Golden-fronted leafbird in a flowering Butea monosperma tree

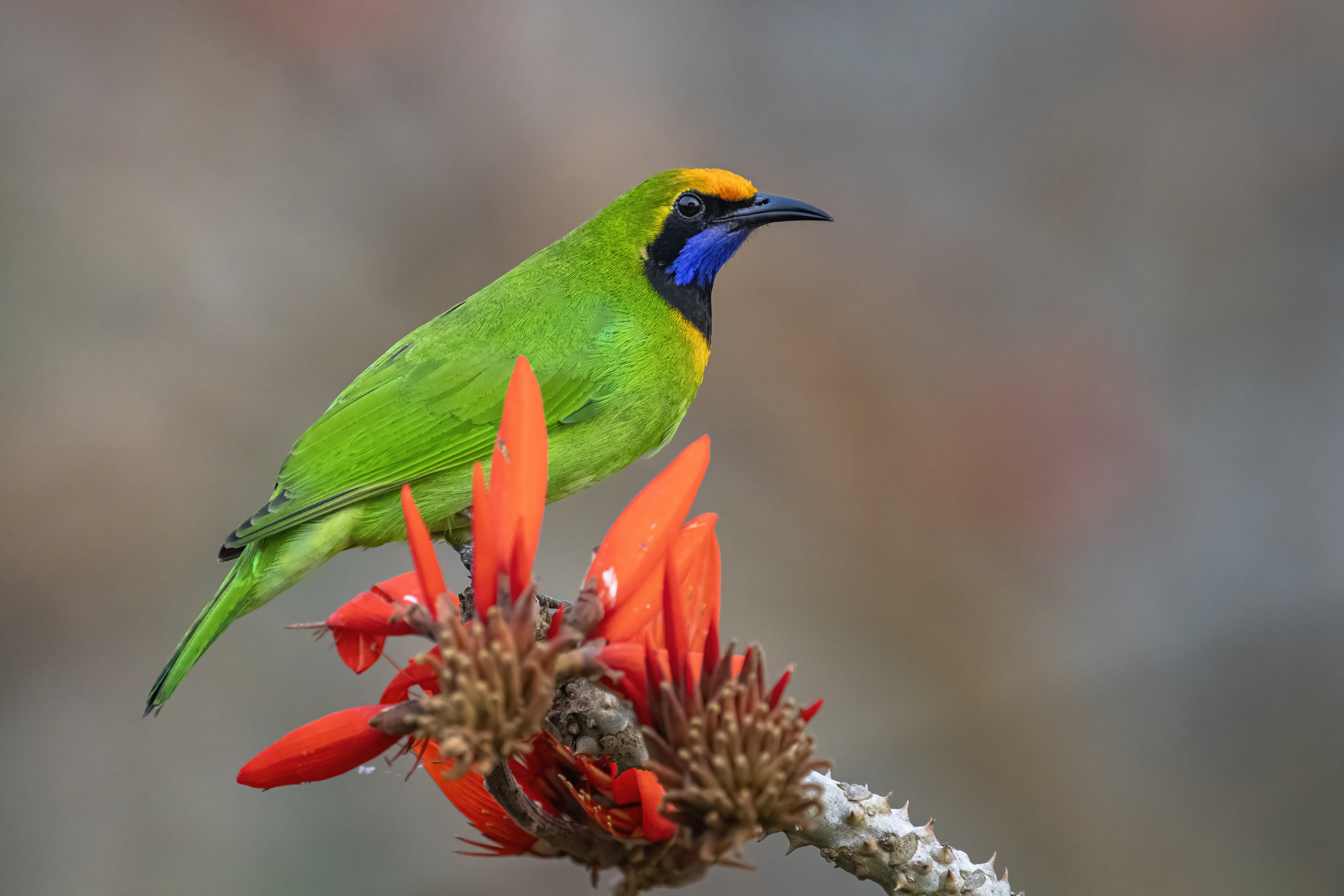
Golden-fronted leafbird at Erythrina flowers in Bangladesh.

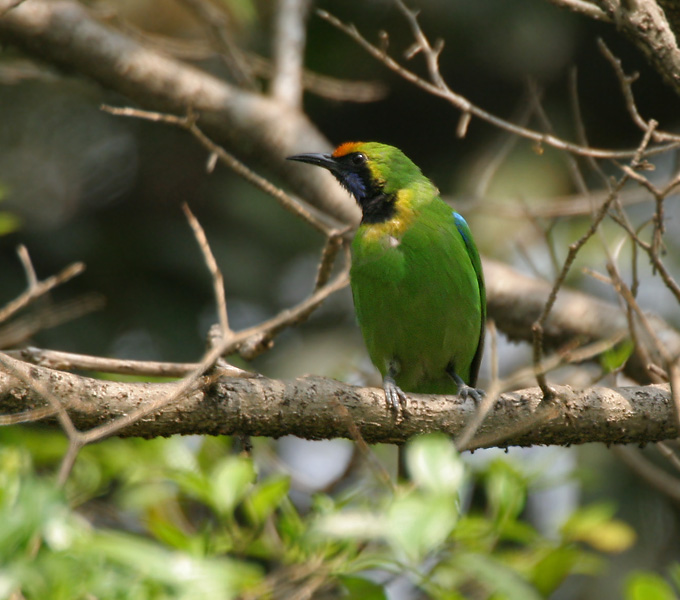
At Jayanti in Buxa Tiger Reserve in Jalpaiguri district of West Bengal, India.

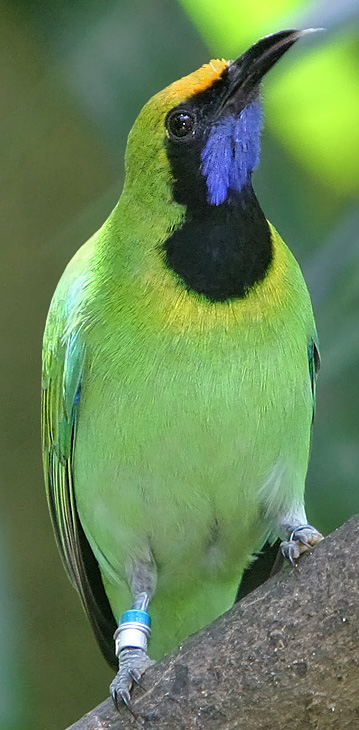
At Jurong BirdPark, Singapore

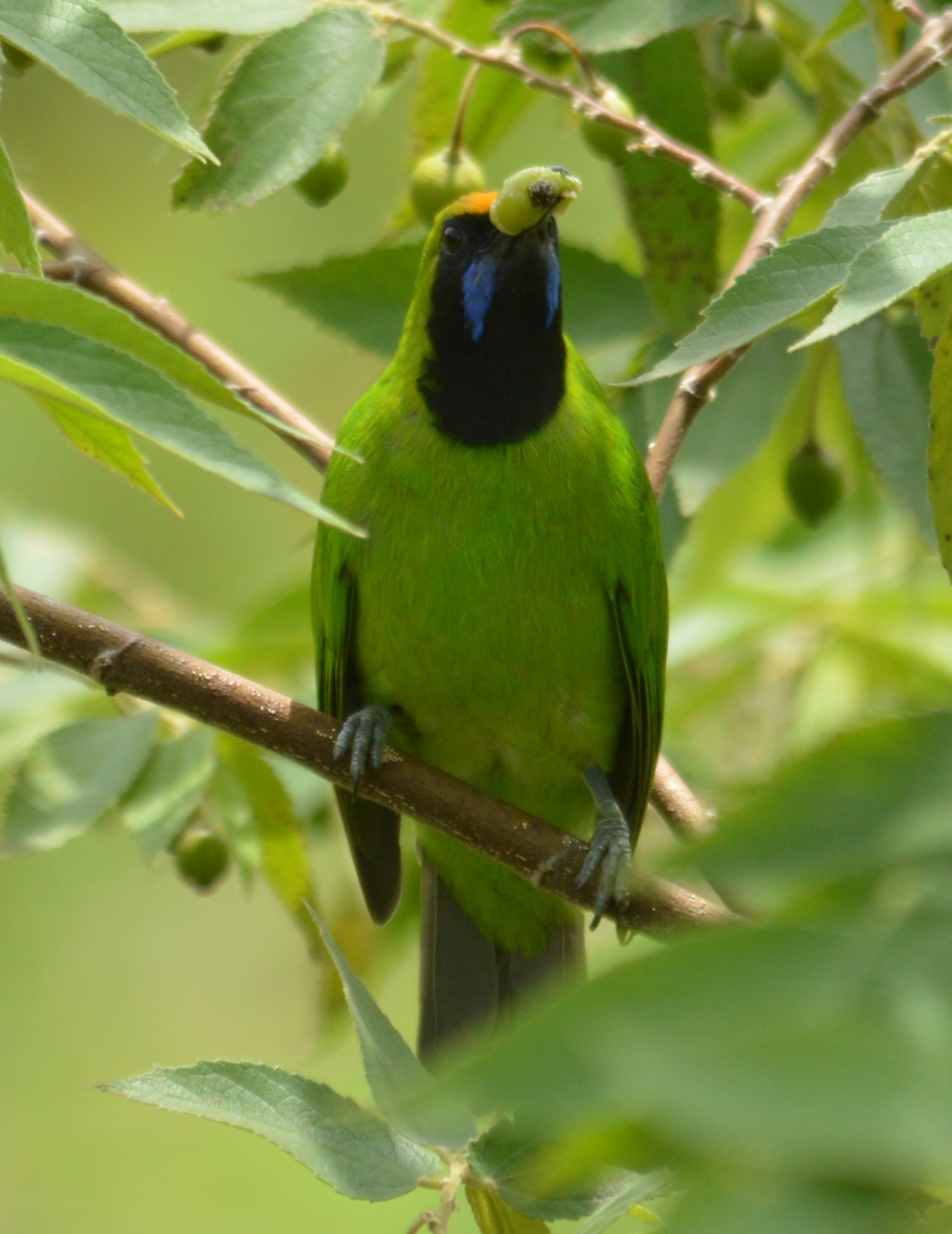
Male in Nagarhole National Park, India

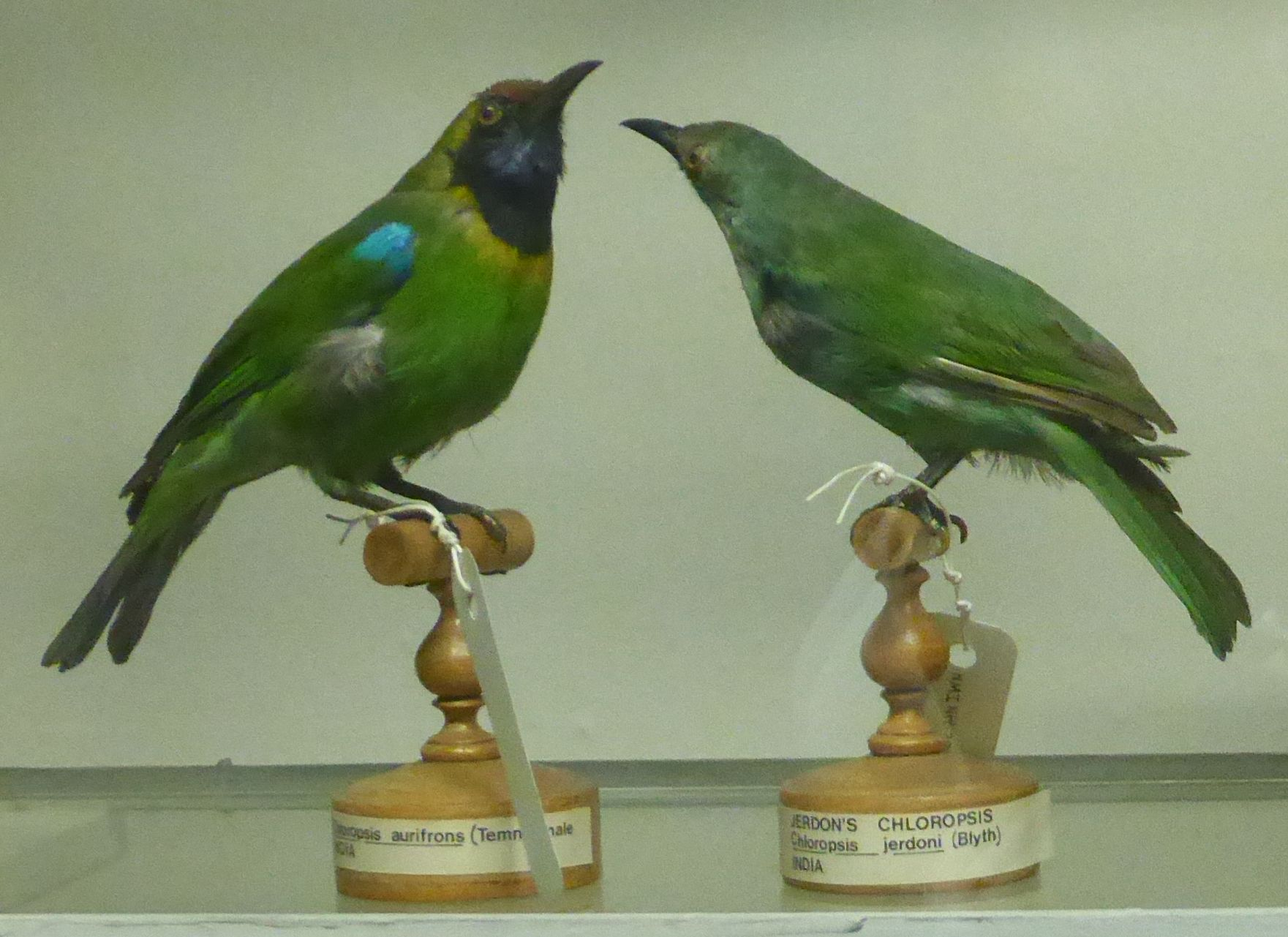
Golden-fronted leafbird and Jerdon's leafbird in National Museum of Ireland - Natural History
