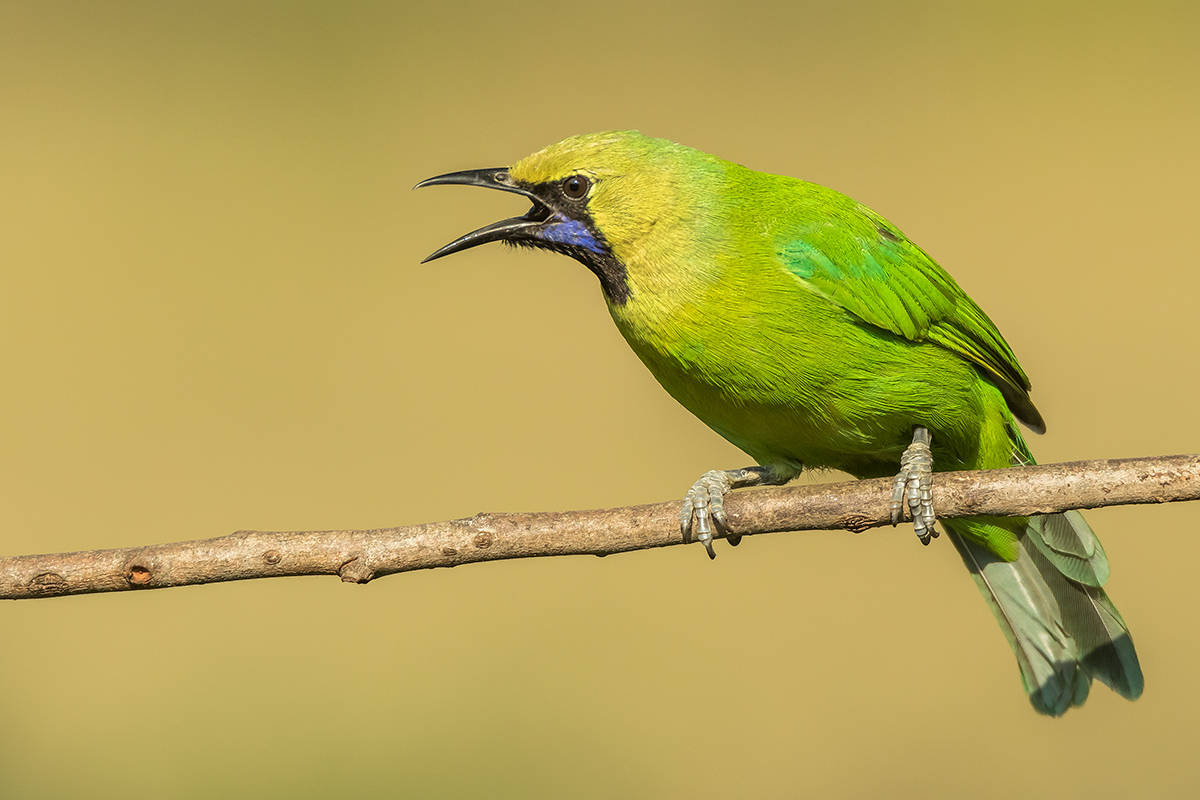

Conservation status
- Least Concern (IUCN 3.1)

Scientific classification
- Kingdom: Animalia
- Phylum: Chordata
- Class: Aves
- Order: Passeriformes
- Family: Chloropseidae
- Genus: Chloropsis
- Species: C. jerdoni

Binomial name
- Chloropsis jerdoni (Blyth, 1844)

Synonyms
- Chloropsis cochinchinensis jerdoni

= Jerdon's leafbird =

Species of bird

Jerdon's leafbird (Chloropsis jerdoni) is a species of leafbird found in forest and woodland in India and Sri Lanka. Its name honours Thomas C. Jerdon. It has traditionally been considered a subspecies of the blue-winged leafbird (C. cochinchinensis), but differ in measurements and morphology, it lacking the blue flight feathers for which the blue-winged leafbird was named.

It builds its nest in a tree, and lays 2–3 eggs. This species eats insects, fruit and nectar.

The male is green-bodied with a yellow-tinged head, black face and throat. It has a blue moustachial line. The female differs in that it has a greener head and blue throat, and young birds are like the female but without the blue throat patch.

Like other leafbirds, the call of Jerdon's leafbird consists of a rich mixture of imitations of the calls of various other species of birds. They are very shy of water, will only come down to drink for very short periods and are quick to flee.

== Gallery ==
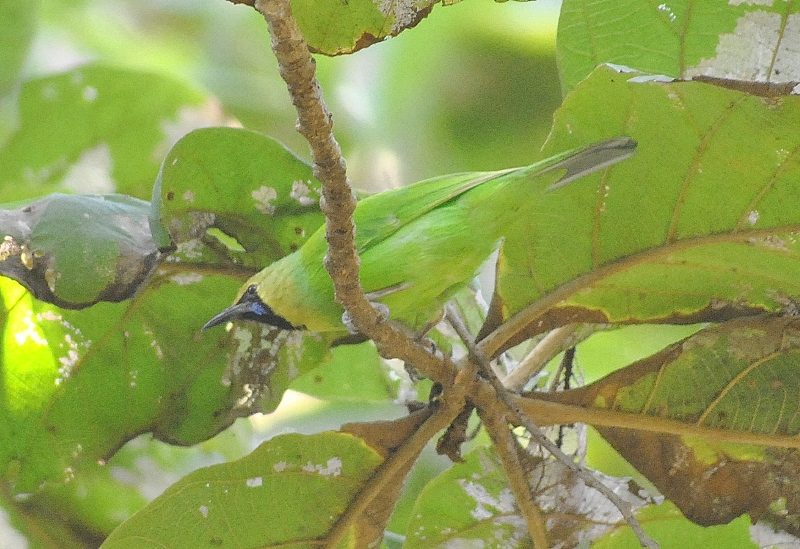
Male in Ankola, India

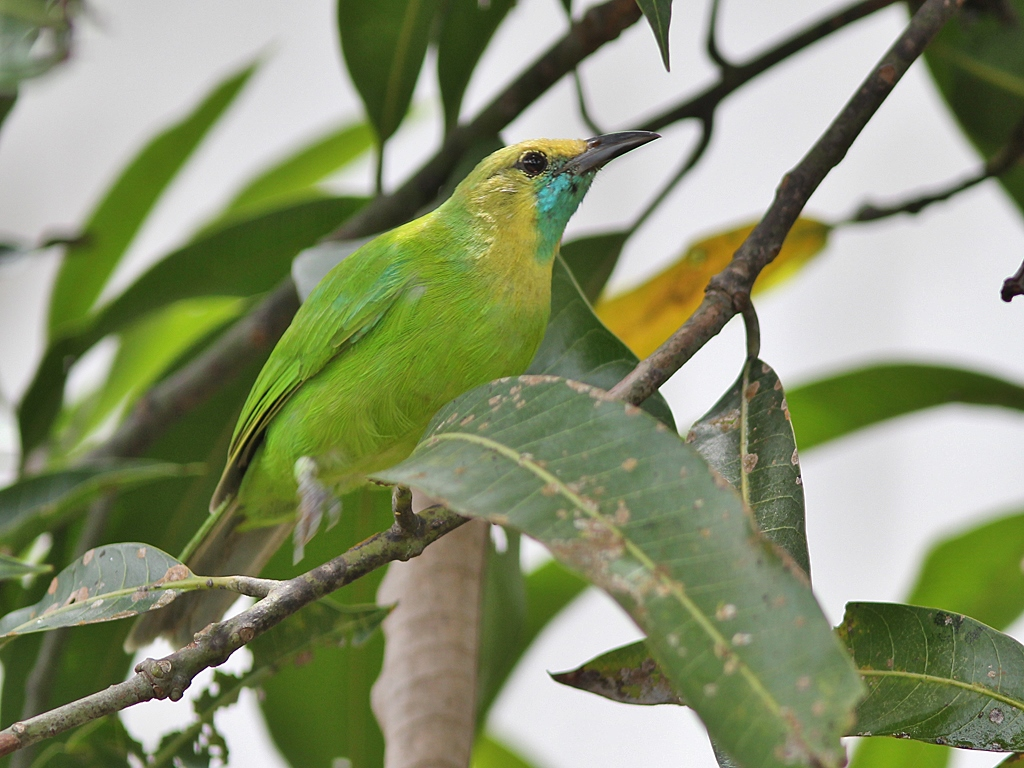
Female in Kannur, Kerala

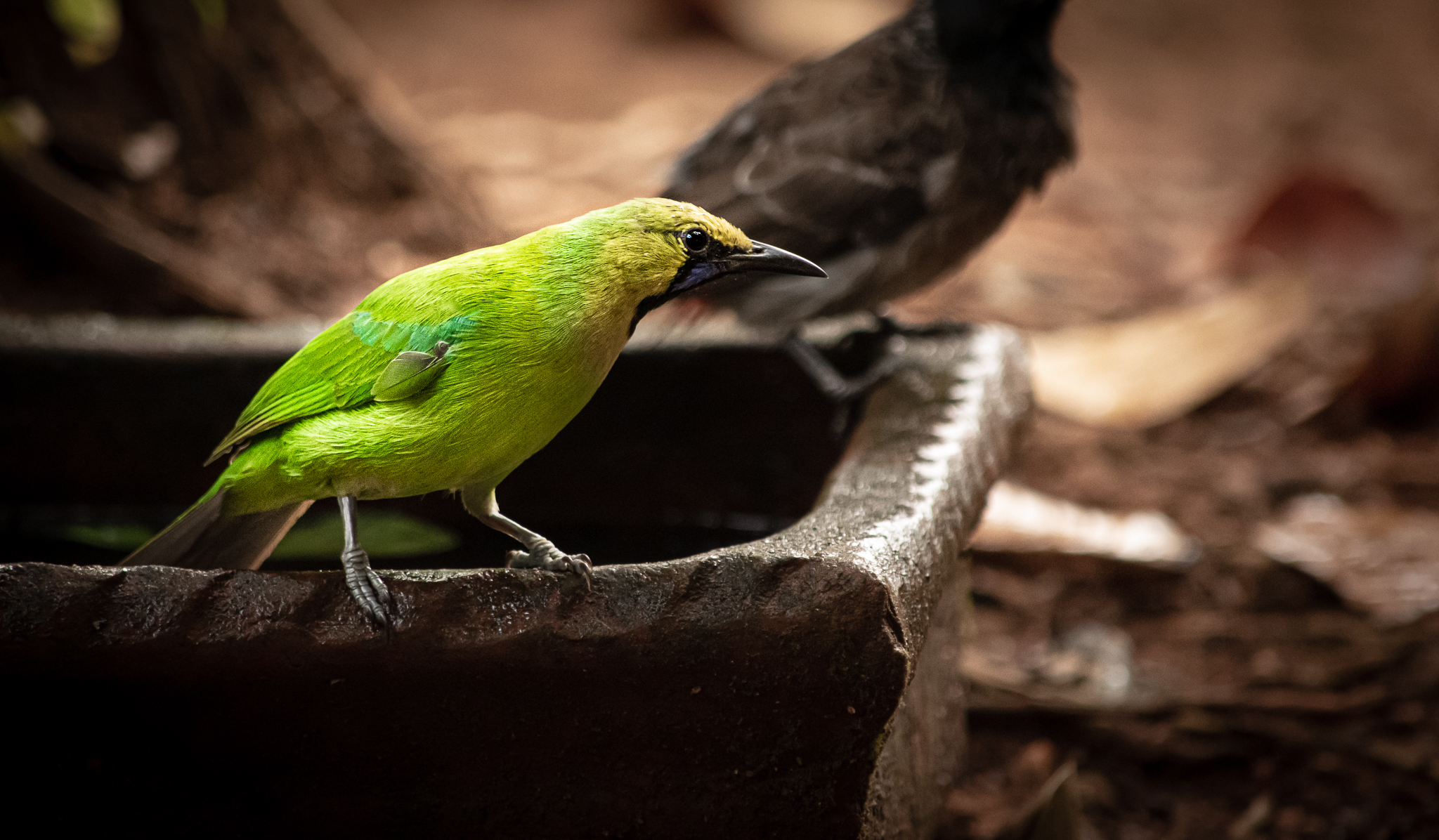
A male Jerdon's leafbird taking a bath.

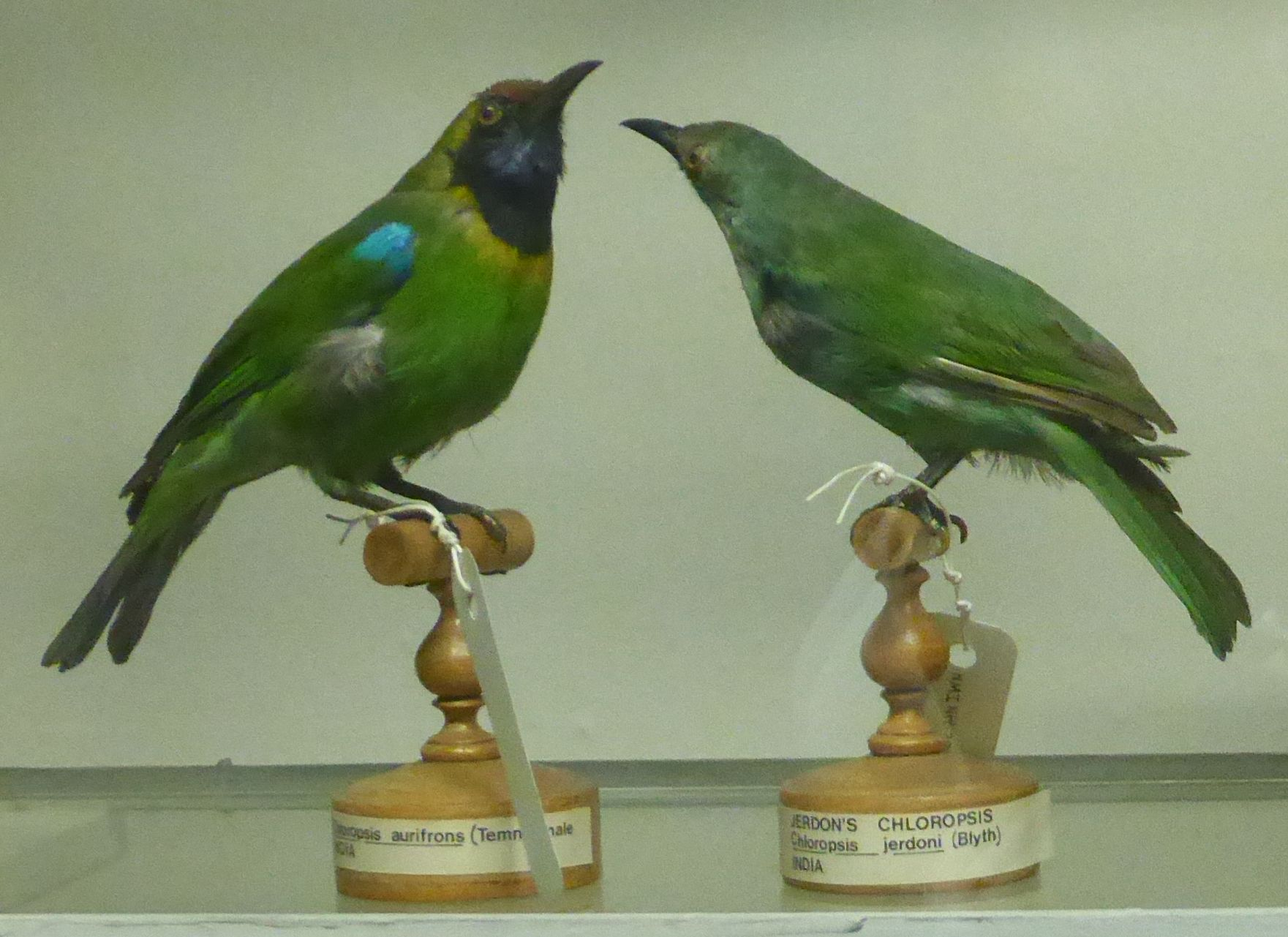
Golden-fronted leafbird and Jerdon's leafbird in National Museum of Ireland - Natural History

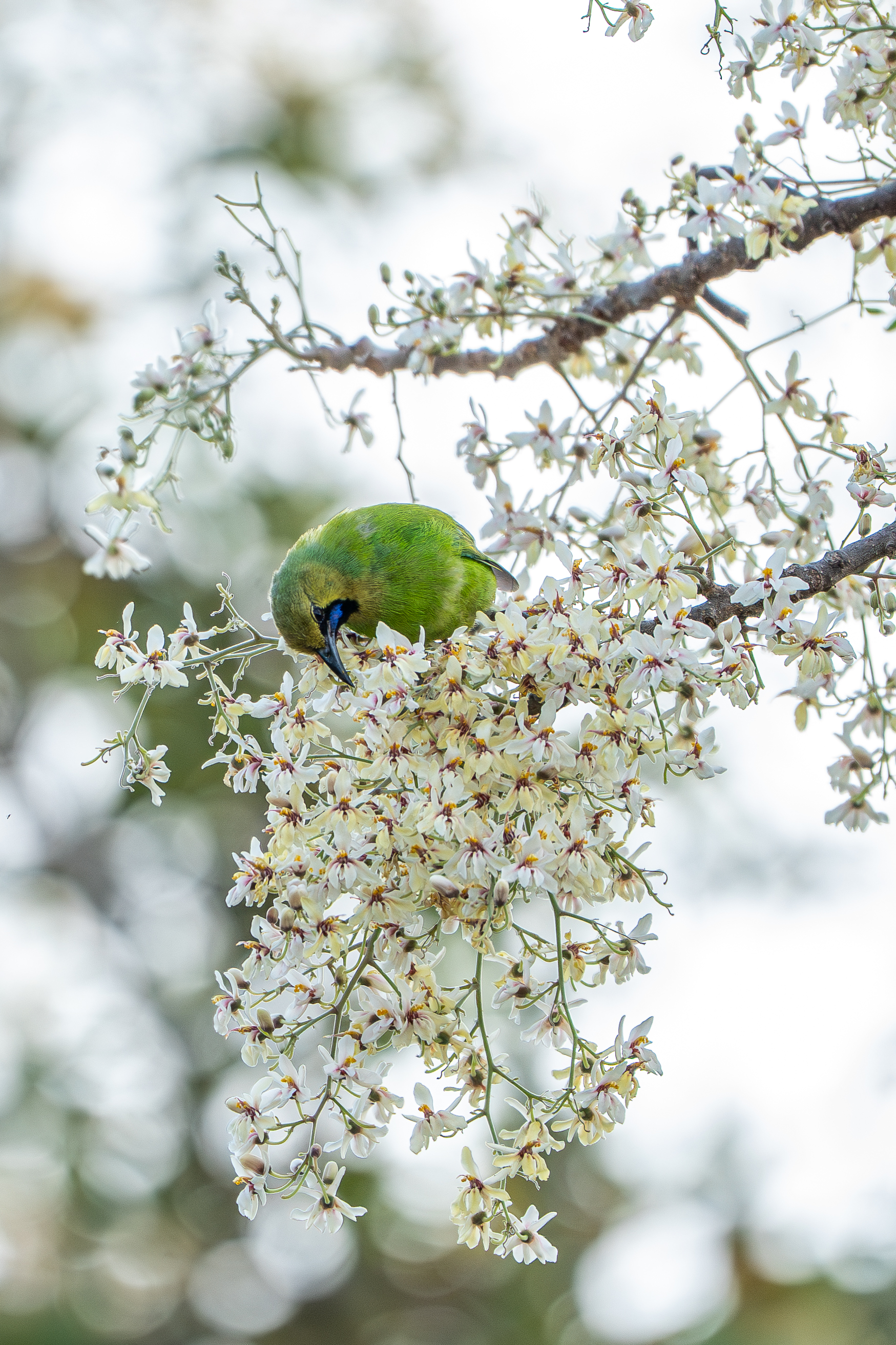
Jerdon’s Leafbird feeding on nectar from a wild, blooming moringa in Sathyamangalam Tiger Reserve.
