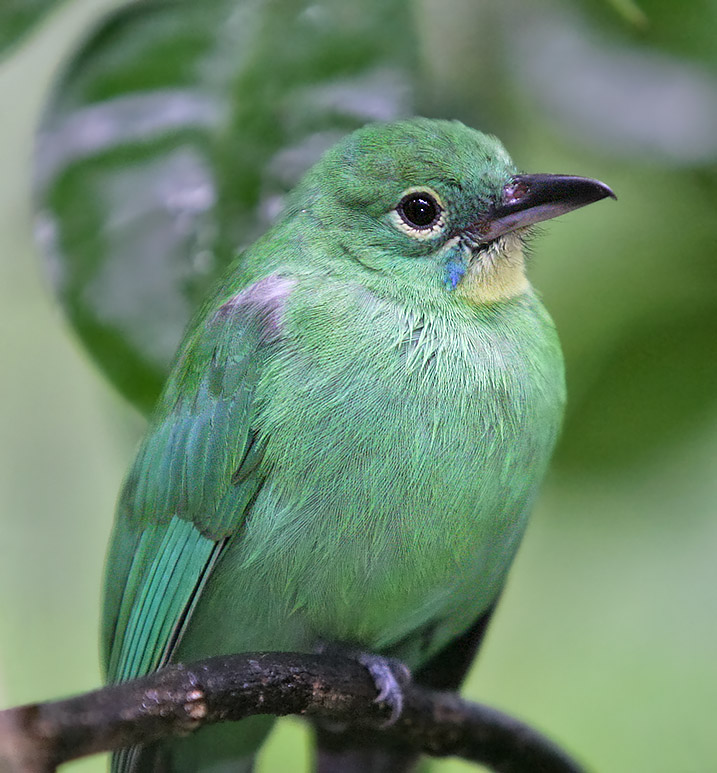
- Female

Conservation status
- Endangered (IUCN 3.1)

Scientific classification
- Kingdom: Animalia
- Phylum: Chordata
- Class: Aves
- Order: Passeriformes
- Family: Chloropseidae
- Genus: Chloropsis
- Species: C. sonnerati

Binomial name
- Chloropsis sonnerati Jardine & Selby, 1827
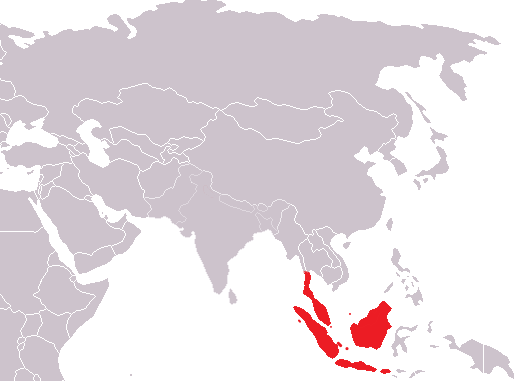
- Distribution

= Greater green leafbird =

Species of bird

The greater green leafbird (Chloropsis sonnerati) is a species of bird in the family Chloropseidae. It is distinguished from the lesser green leafbird (Chloropsis cyanopogon) by its powerful beak, yellow throat and eye ring of the female; and lack of a yellow border along the black throat patch found in the male C. cyanopogan.

It is found in Brunei, Indonesia, Malaysia, Myanmar, Singapore, and Thailand. In Indonesia, it is found in Sumatra, Borneo, Natuna Islands, Java and Bali. Its natural habitats are subtropical or tropical moist lowland forest and subtropical or tropical mangrove forest, mainly old-growth forest but also secondary forest and edges.

It moves quite conspicuously at the canopy level, jumping between branches and flying from tree to tree. It often visits fruiting fig trees, but also takes insects and small invertebrates.

The greater green leafbird has a loud voice, consisting of an ascending whistle chee-zi-chee.

The species is threatened by trapping for the cage bird trade and has become rare or even disappeared in large parts of its range.
