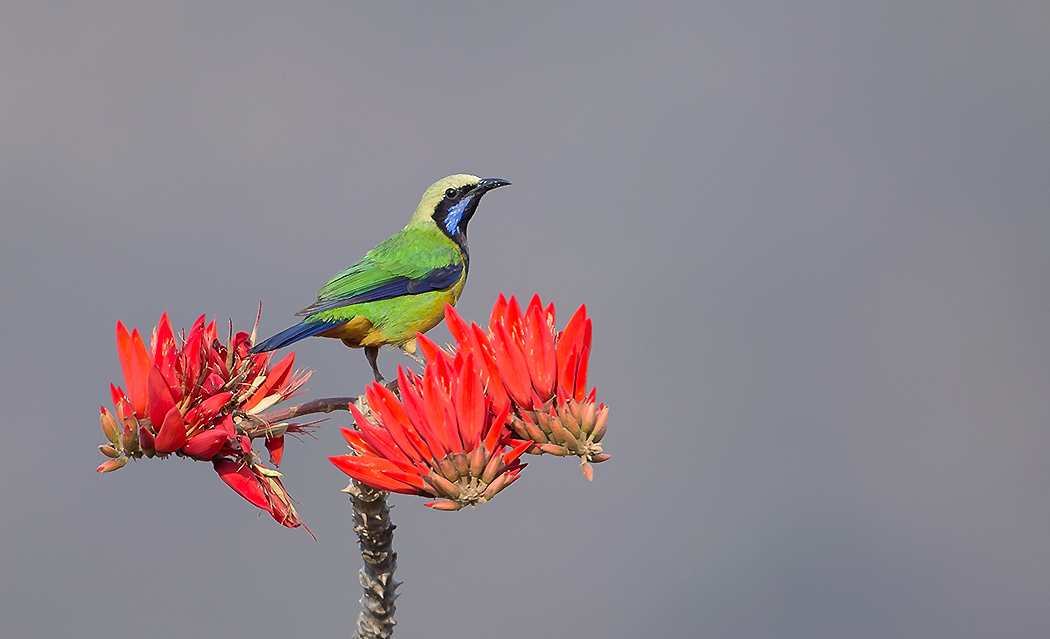
- Male
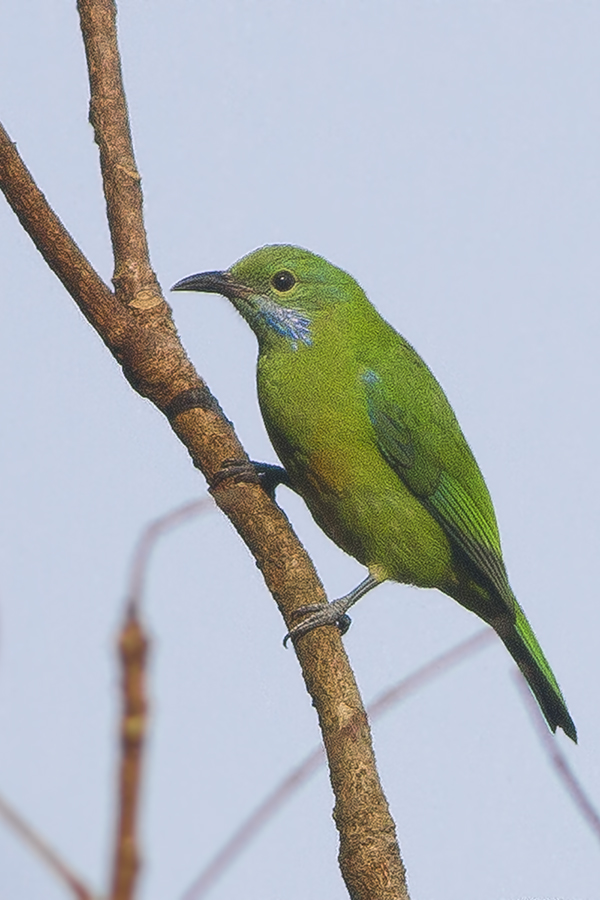
- Female

Conservation status
- Least Concern (IUCN 3.1)

Scientific classification
- Kingdom: Animalia
- Phylum: Chordata
- Class: Aves
- Order: Passeriformes
- Family: Chloropseidae
- Genus: Chloropsis
- Species: C. hardwickii

Binomial name
- Chloropsis hardwickii Jardine & Selby, 1830

= Orange-bellied leafbird =

Species of bird

The orange-bellied leafbird (Chloropsis hardwickii) is a bird native to the central and eastern Himalayas, Yunnan and northern parts of Southeast Asia. The greyish-crowned leafbird, which is found in Hainan, is again considered conspecific. The scientific name commemorates the English naturalist Thomas Hardwicke.

== Description ==
It is brightly coloured with an orange belly, a green back, a blue tail and flight feathers, and a black and blue patch over its throat and chest. It has a long, curved beak. It feeds on insects, spiders and nectar. Orange-bellied leafbirds make their nests from roots and fibers which are suspended from the edges of twigs at the end of a tree branch. They do not migrate.
