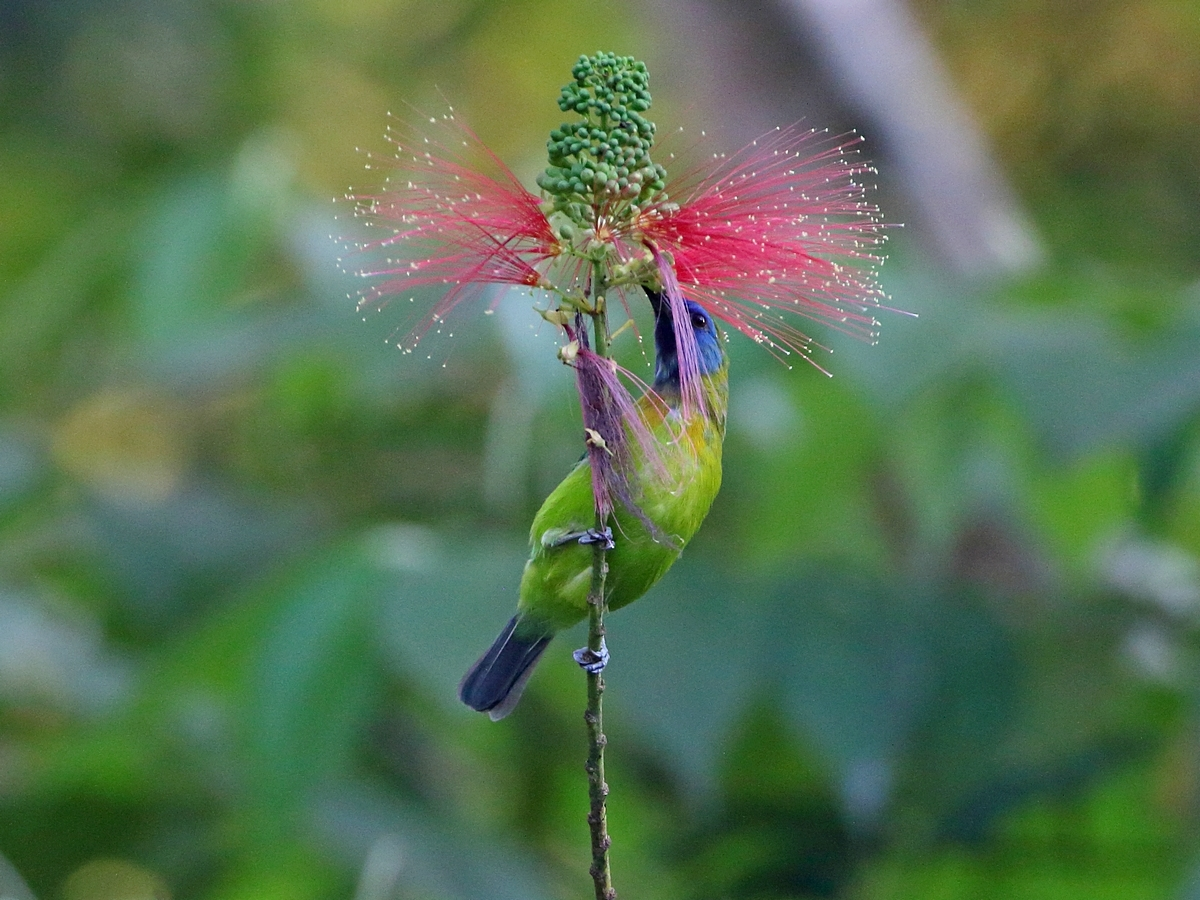

Conservation status
- Near Threatened (IUCN 3.1)

Scientific classification
- Kingdom: Animalia
- Phylum: Chordata
- Class: Aves
- Order: Passeriformes
- Family: Chloropseidae
- Genus: Chloropsis
- Species: C. venusta

Binomial name
- Chloropsis venusta (Bonaparte, 1850)

= Blue-masked leafbird =

Species of bird

The blue-masked leafbird (Chloropsis venusta) is a species of bird in the family Chloropseidae. It is endemic to humid montane forest in the western regions of the Indonesian island of Sumatra. Generally, it lives in areas from 600 to 1,500 m (1,969–4,921 ft) in elevation. It is the smallest species of leafbird.

It is considered near threatened due to habitat loss.
