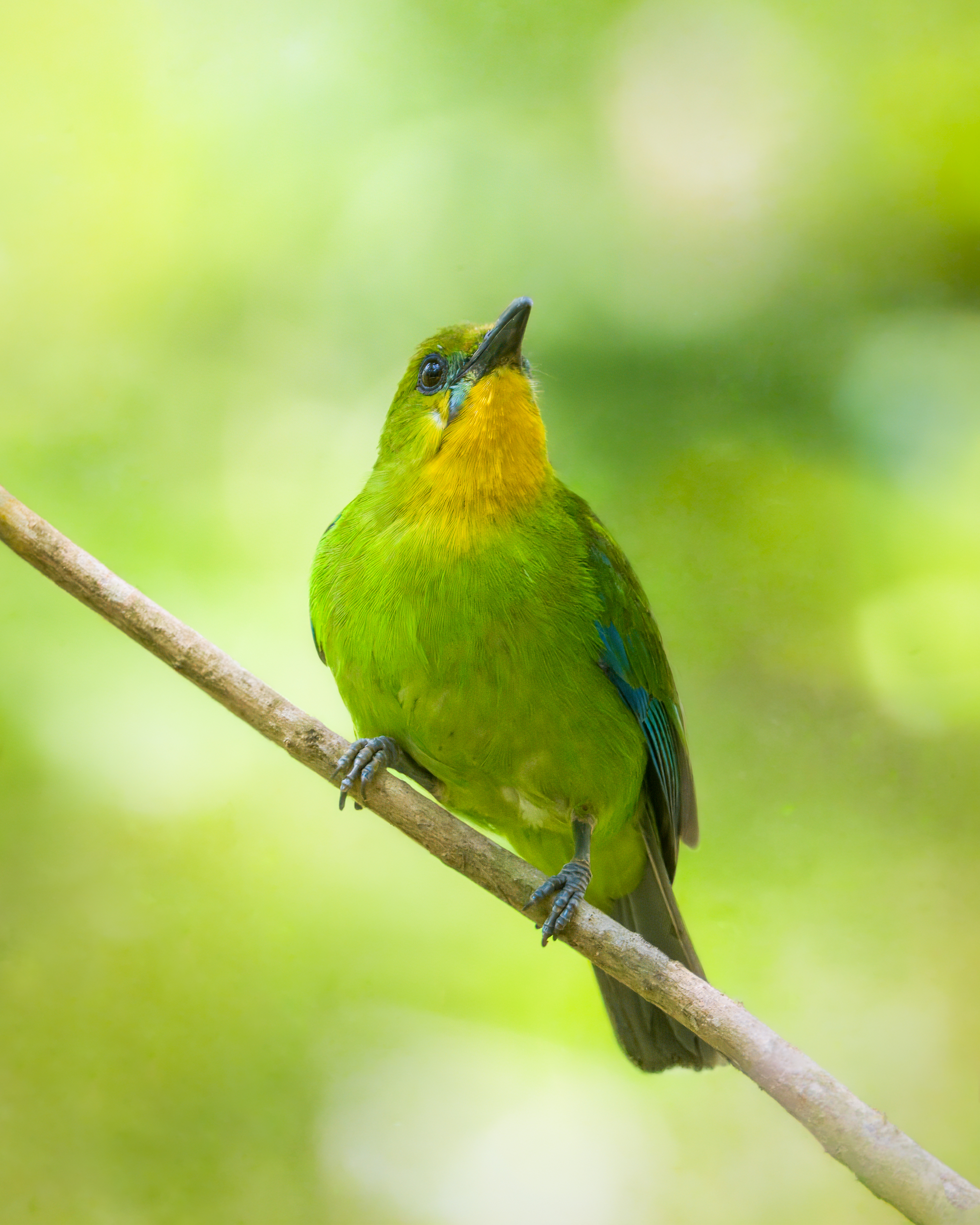

Conservation status
- Least Concern (IUCN 3.1)

Scientific classification
- Kingdom: Animalia
- Phylum: Chordata
- Class: Aves
- Order: Passeriformes
- Family: Chloropseidae
- Genus: Chloropsis
- Species: C. palawanensis

Binomial name
- Chloropsis palawanensis (Sharpe, 1876)
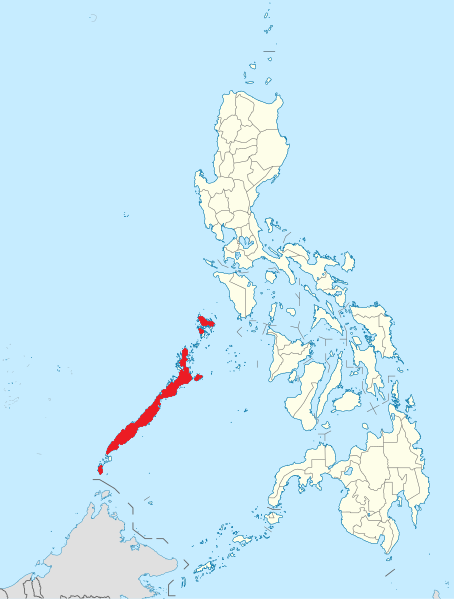

= Yellow-throated leafbird =

Species of bird

The yellow-throated leafbird (Chloropsis palawanensis) is a species of bird in the family Chloropseidae. It is endemic to the Palawan in the Philippines. Its natural habitat is tropical moist lowland forest. Along with the Philippine leafbird, it is one of the two endemic leafbirds in the country.

== Description and taxonomy ==
It is slightly smaller than the Philippine leafbird and is generally more colorful with its bright yellow throat and blue lores and edges of its wing. This is monotypic and has no subspecies.

== Ecology and behavior ==
Typically forages alone but also joins mixed-species flocks, often with bulbuls, foraging for fruits and seeds.

No information known about its breeding habits.

== Habitat and conservation status ==
Its habitat is primary lowland forest but it does occasionally visit secondary growth.

It is assessed as least-concern species under the IUCN. However, Palawan's forests are under threat due to illegal logging, deforestation, land conversion and mining. The whole of Palawan was designated as a Biosphere Reserve; however, protection and enforcement of laws has been difficult and these threats still continue. It occurs in just one protected area in the Iwahig Prison and Penal Farm.
