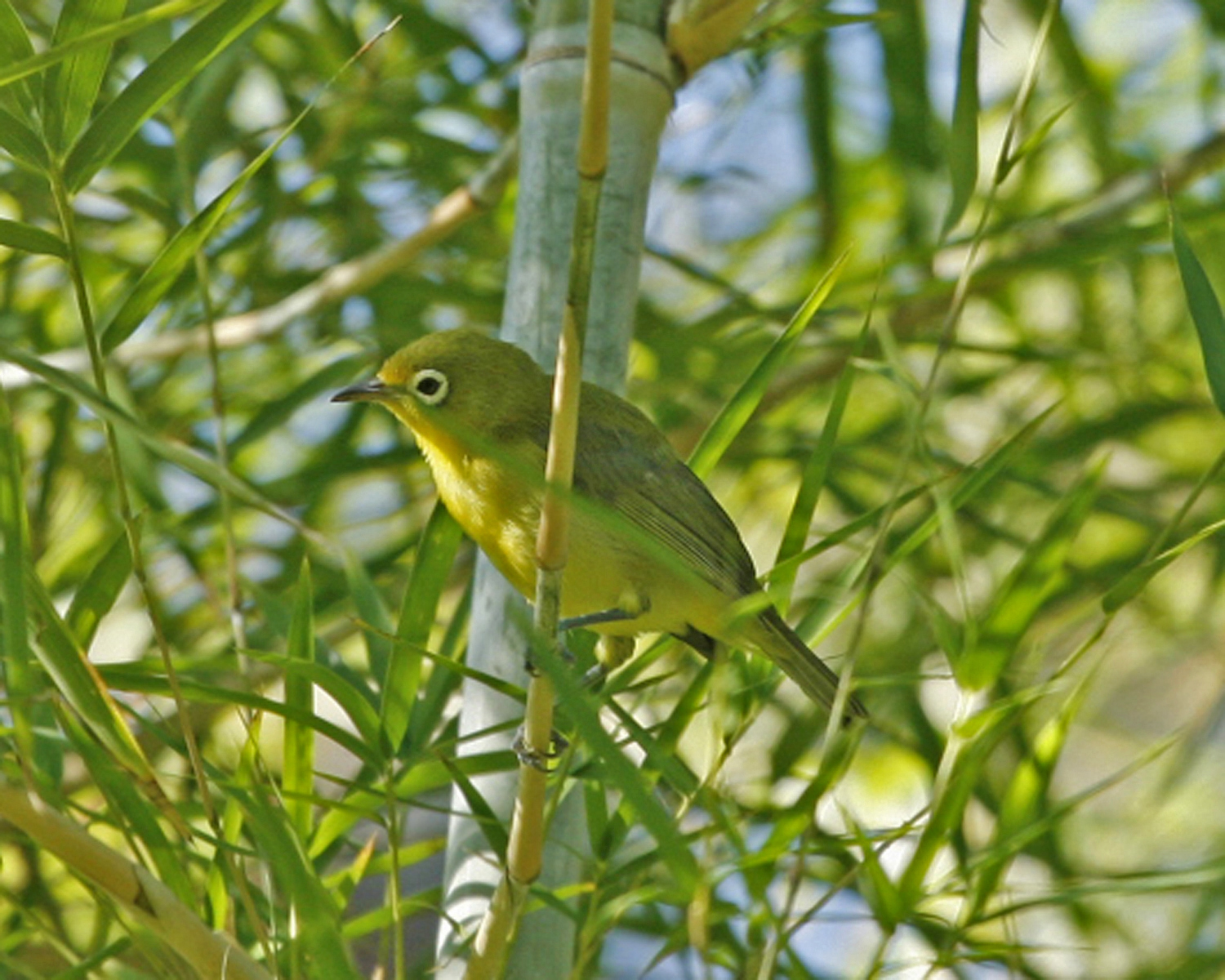

Conservation status
- Least Concern (IUCN 3.1)

Scientific classification
- Kingdom: Animalia
- Phylum: Chordata
- Class: Aves
- Order: Passeriformes
- Family: Zosteropidae
- Genus: Zosterops
- Species: Z. chloris

Binomial name
- Zosterops chloris Bonaparte, 1850

= Lemon-bellied white-eye =

Species of bird

The lemon-bellied white-eye (Zosterops chloris) is a species of bird in the family Zosteropidae. It is endemic to Indonesia, where it occurs on a number of islands from the Sunda Strait to the Aru Islands. It is present on several of the Lesser Sunda Islands as well as on parts of Sulawesi, as well as many smaller islands, but is absent from the larger islands of Borneo, Java, Sumatra and Timor. Currently (May 2017), HBW describes five sub-species of lemon-bellied white-eye. However, the extensive distribution of Z. c. intermedius (including S. Sulawesi, SE. Sulawesi, C. Lesser Sundas and small islands in between) is likely to contain more than one reproductively isolated population (cf. Z.c. intermedius and Z. c. flavissimus, with the latter now considered a distinct species, the Wakatobi white-eye (Z. flavissimus).

The lemon-bellied white-eye's natural habitats are subtropical or tropical moist lowland forests and subtropical or tropical mangrove forests. On the islands of Buton and Kabaena the lemon-bellied white-eye appears limited to coastal regions, perhaps as a result of competition with the pale-bellied white-eye. Observations from Buton suggest that the lemon-bellied white-eye prefers more disturbed habitats. Their diet consists of invertebrates, fruits, and nectar. They have strong dark grey legs, a dark colored beak, and generally range in size from 11 to 12 cm. They are a yellow-olive color on the dorsal side, with characteristic bright yellow underparts.
