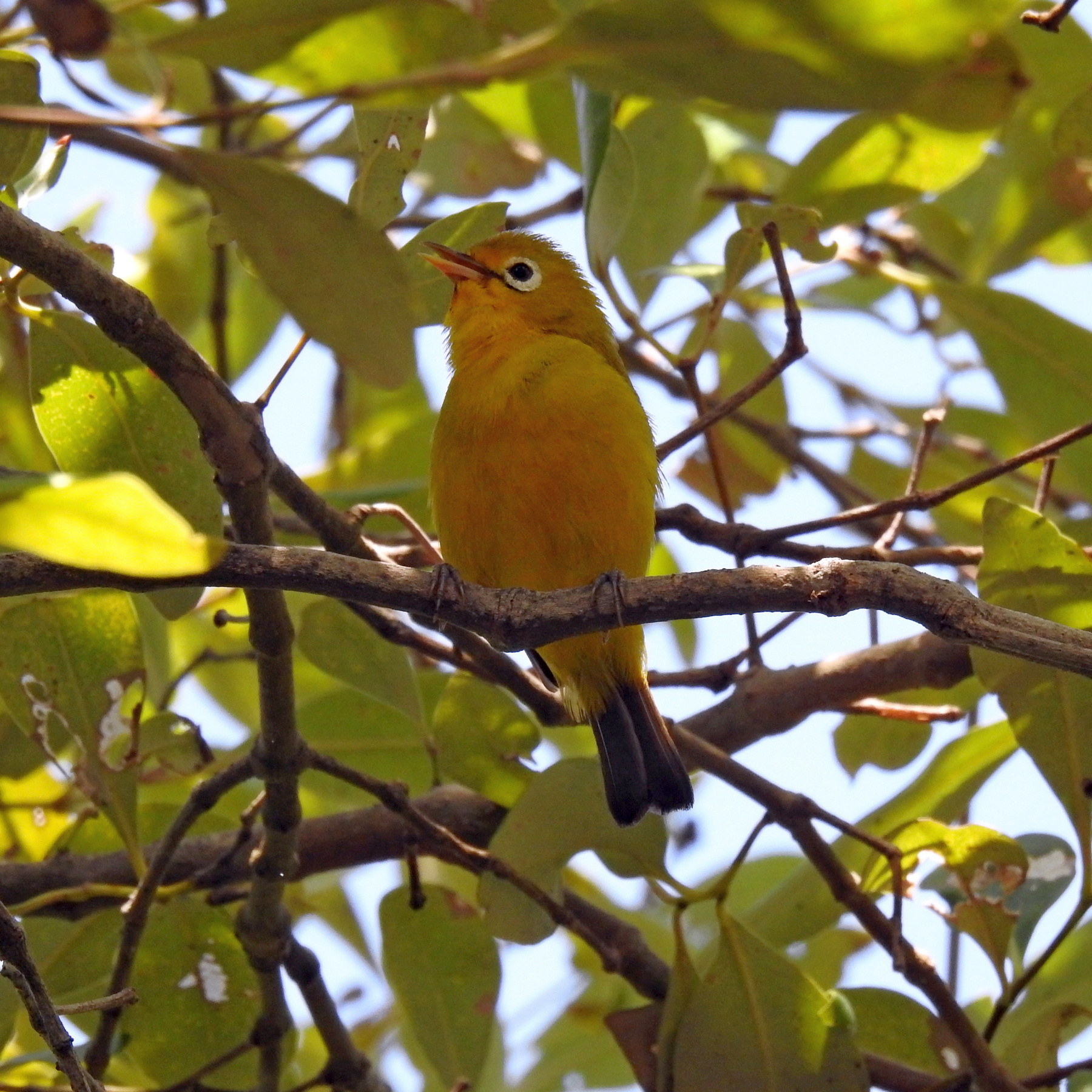

Scientific classification
- Kingdom: Animalia
- Phylum: Chordata
- Class: Aves
- Order: Passeriformes
- Family: Zosteropidae
- Genus: Zosterops
- Species: Z. flavissimus

Binomial name
- Zosterops flavissimus Hartert, 1903

Synonyms
- Zosterops chloris flavissimus, Hartert, 1903

= Wakatobi white-eye =

Species of bird

The Wakatobi white-eye (Zosterops flavissimus) is a species of bird in the family Zosteropidae. It is endemic to Indonesia, where it is known only from the Wakatobi Islands off south-eastern Sulawesi. It can be distinguished from most other Indonesian white-eyes by its bright yellow belly. It was formerly considered a subspecies of the lemon-bellied white-eye (Z. chloris), but it was long known to be reproductively isolated from the rest of the species, and a 2019 genetic study found it to be a distinct species.
