= Mount Besar =

Mountain in Indonesia

- Gunung Besar
- Location within Sumatra

Highest point
- Elevation: 1,899 m (6,230 ft)
- Coordinates: 4°26′S 103°40′E

Geography
- Location: Sumatra, Indonesia
- Parent range: Bukit Barisan

Geology
- Mountain type: stratovolcano
- Volcanic arc: Sunda Arc
- Last eruption: April 1940

Mount Besar (Indonesian: Gunung Besar, means: Big Mountain) is a stratovolcano in the southeast of Sumatra, Indonesia. A minor sulfur deposit can be found in the crater. A big solfatara field called Marga Bayur is located along its north–south-west flanks or the Semangko fault system.

== See also ==
- List of volcanoes in Indonesia
