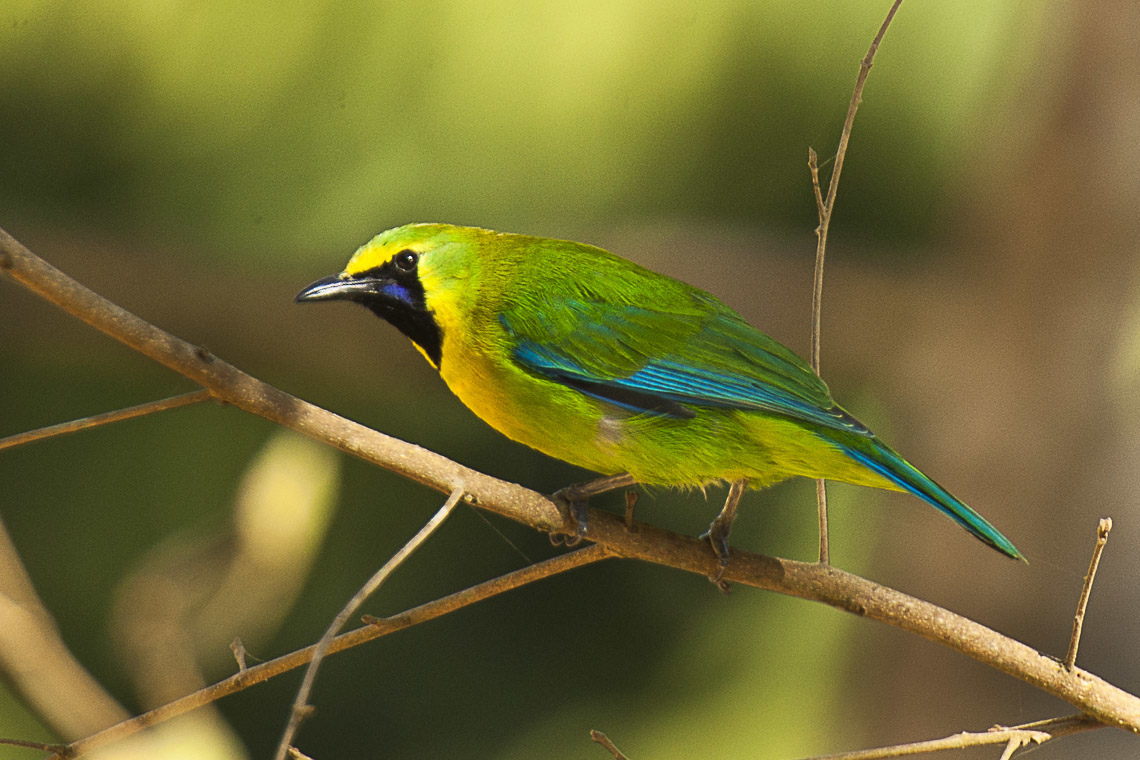
- Male

Conservation status
- Least Concern (IUCN 3.1)

Scientific classification
- Kingdom: Animalia
- Phylum: Chordata
- Class: Aves
- Order: Passeriformes
- Family: Chloropseidae
- Genus: Chloropsis
- Species: C. moluccensis

Binomial name
- Chloropsis moluccensis Gray, JE, 1831

= Blue-winged leafbird =

Species of bird

The blue-winged leafbird (Chloropsis moluccensis) is a species of leafbird found in forest and second growth throughout Southeast Asia as far east as Borneo and as far south as southern Sumatra. It previously included Jerdon's leafbird (C. jerdoni) from the Indian subcontinent, and the Bornean leafbird (C. kinabaluensis) from northern Borneo as subspecies, but differs from both in measurements and morphology, with Jerdon's lacking any blue to the flight feathers, and Bornean having a distinctive male-like female plumage. The Javan leafbird (C. cochinchinensis), which is endemic to Java, was also formerly grouped with the species, but more recent phylogenetic studies have split both. The distribution of the blue-winged and the Bornean leafbird are known to approach each other, but there is no evidence of intergradation.

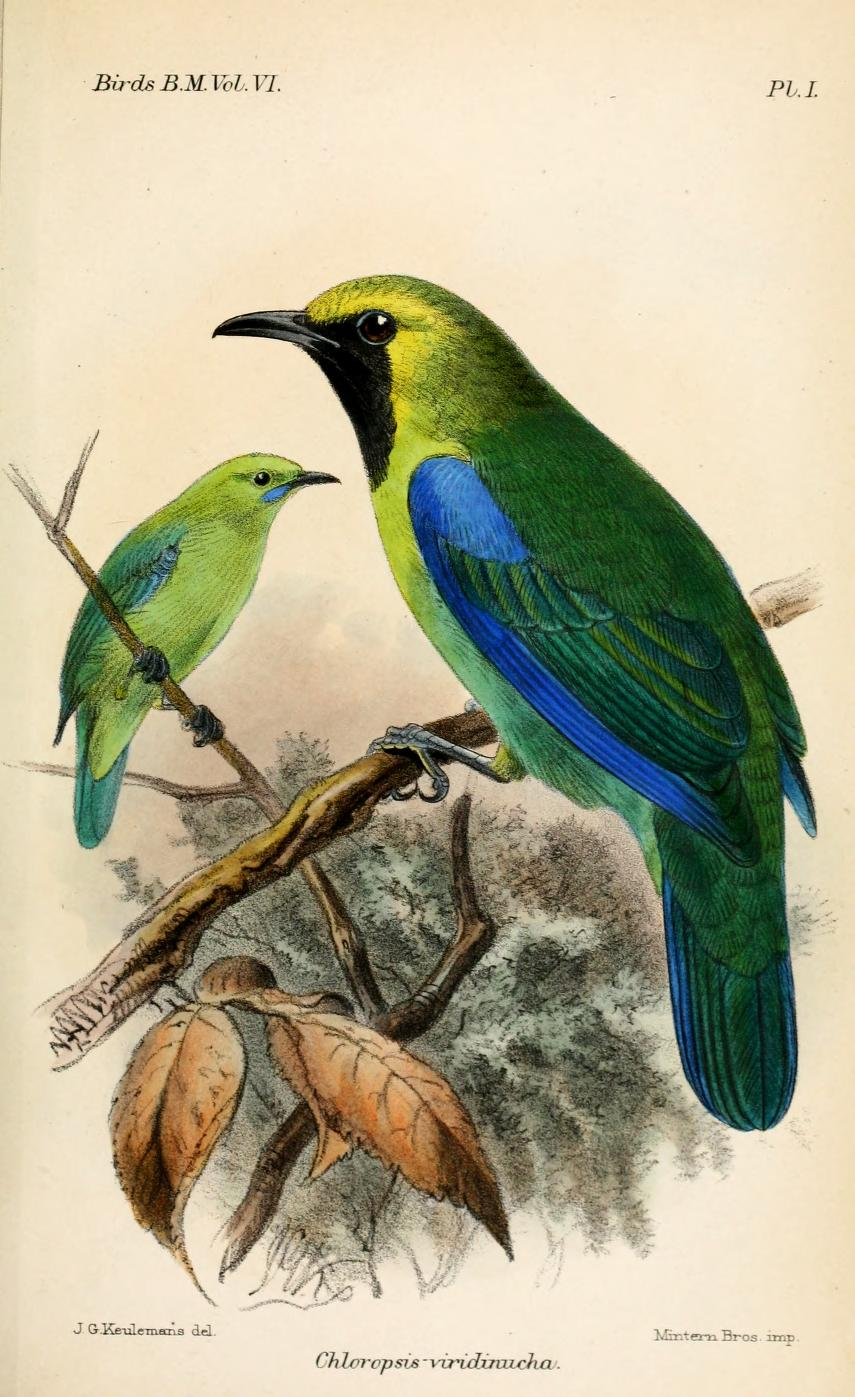
C. c. viridinucha

The male is green-bodied with a yellow-tinged head, black face and throat. It has a blue moustachial line. The female differs in that it has a greener head and blue throat, and young birds are like the female but without the blue throat patch.

It is common to fairly common throughout most of its range, and therefore considered to be of least concern by BirdLife International.

The superficially similar golden-fronted leafbird lacks blue in the flight feathers and tail, and has a golden forehead.

As in other leafbirds, the call of the blue-winged leafbird consists of a rich mixture of imitations of the calls of various other species of birds.

Their wings are blue because cells in their feathers have gyroid crystals.
