= Meratus Mountains =

Mountain range in South Kalimantan, Borneo

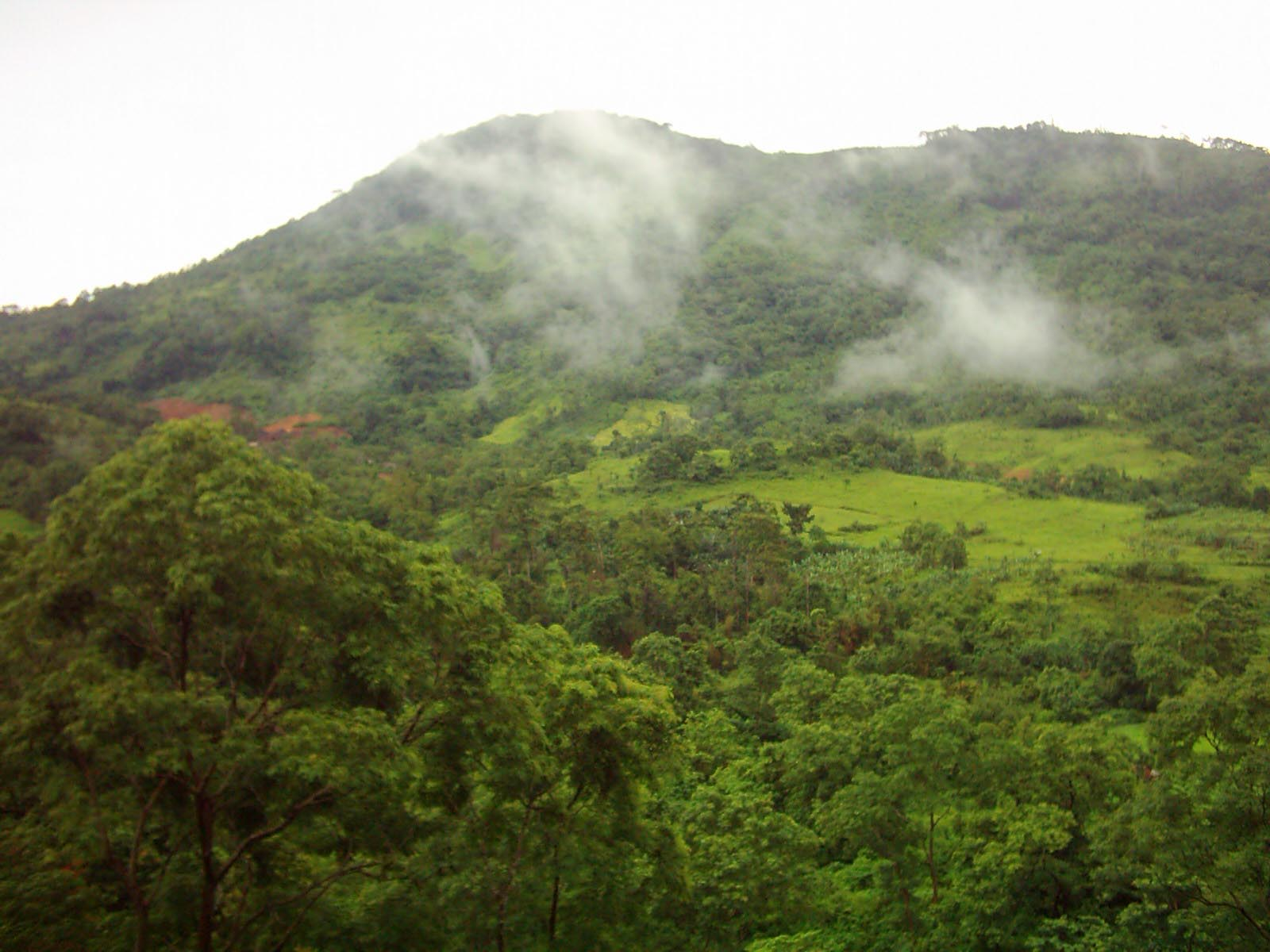

Highest point
- Elevation: 1,892 m (6,207 ft)
- Coordinates: 2°47′00″S 115°29′00″E

Geography
- Location within Borneo
- Location: South Kalimantan, Borneo

The Meratus Mountains is a mountain range in the Indonesian province of South Kalimantan; it is located on Borneo island. The mountains run in a north-south arc that divides South Kalimantan province into two almost equal parts. Its highest peak is Mount Besar at 1,901 metres elevation.

The mountains are inhabited by the "semi-nomadic" Meratus Dayak people.

== Flora and fauna ==
The mountains are surrounded at lower elevations by heavily disturbed lowland rain forest and lands converted to agriculture. The higher elevations are home to submontane and montane forests, which are separated from the main mass of Borneo's montane rain forests in the centre and north of the island by approximately 300 km of lowland forest. The submontane and montane forests cover an area of approximately 2,460 km^{2}. Endemic plants include Gaultheria kalimantanensis (Ericaceae) and the carnivorous pitcher plant Nepenthes boschiana.

The mountains' relative isolation from Borneo's other highlands has allowed for the evolution of several endemic species, including the birds Meratus blue flycatcher (Cyornis kadayangensis) and Meratus white-eye (Zosterops meratusensis). The area has been recognised as an Important Bird Area (IBA) by BirdLife International.

=== Conservation ===
In the 1990s the Borneo Orangutan Survival Foundation reintroduced 350 orangutans into the protected Meratus and Sungai Wain forests. Due to extensive deforestation the ecosystem of the mountains, including many flora and fauna species are endangered. Traditional Dayak villages are also disappearing.
