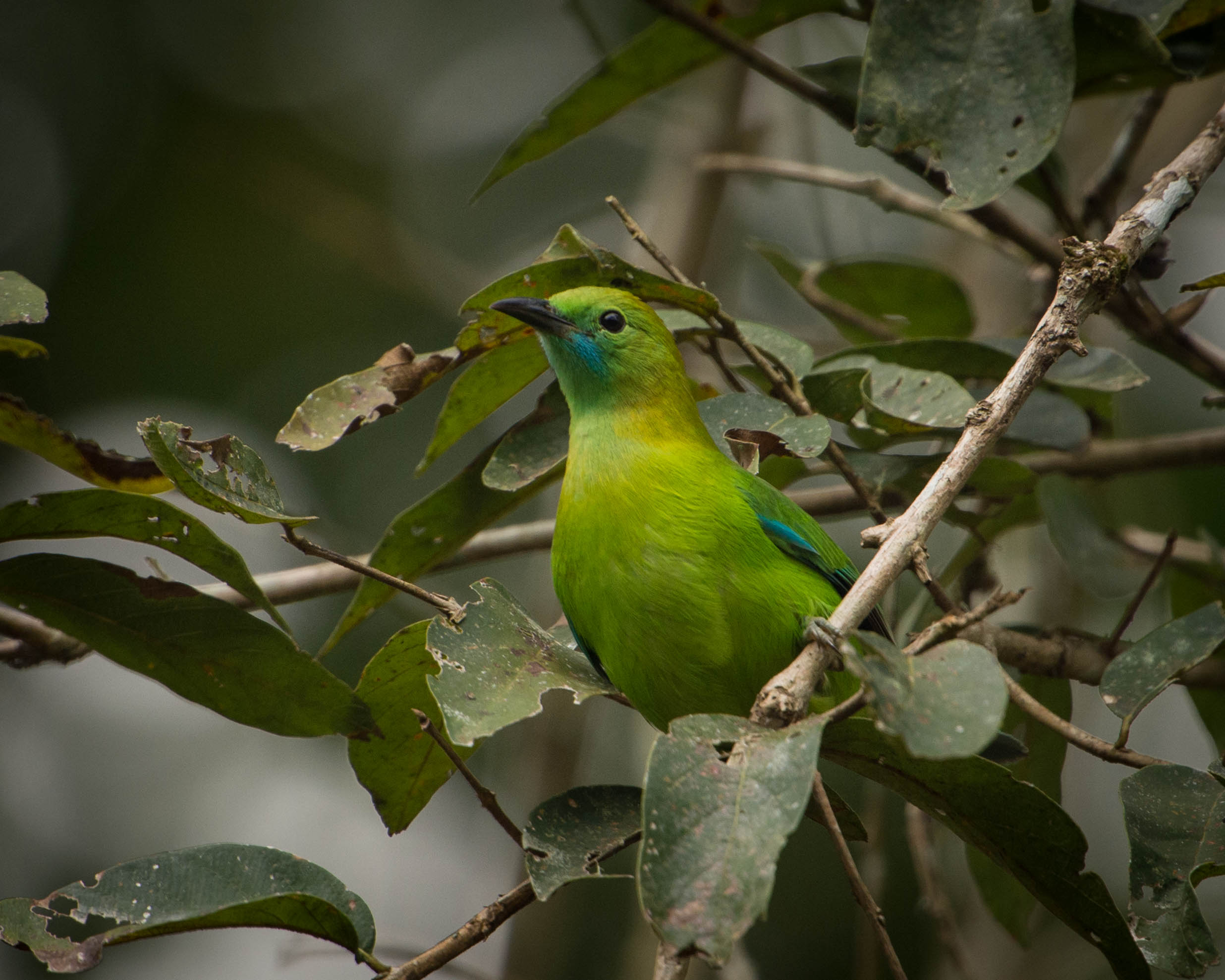

Conservation status
- Near Threatened (IUCN 3.1)

Scientific classification
- Kingdom: Animalia
- Phylum: Chordata
- Class: Aves
- Order: Passeriformes
- Family: Chloropseidae
- Genus: Chloropsis
- Species: C. cyanopogon

Binomial name
- Chloropsis cyanopogon (Temminck, 1830)
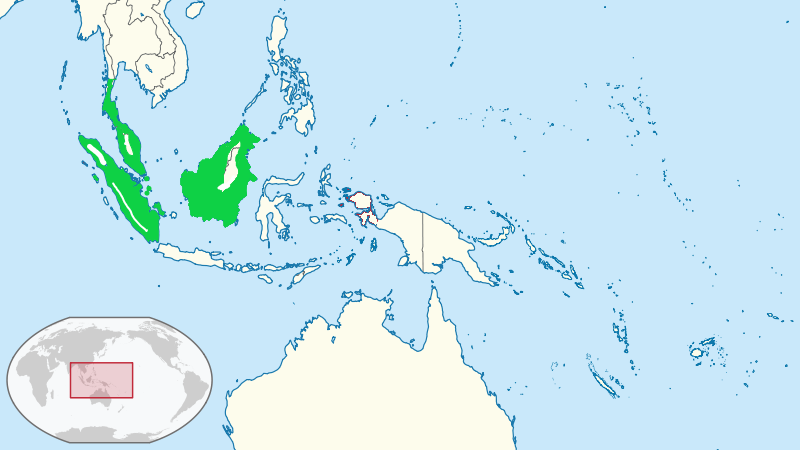
- Current distribution

= Lesser green leafbird =

Lesser green dilip

Species of bird

The lesser green leafbird (Chloropsis cyanopogon) is a species of bird in the family Chloropseidae. It is found in Brunei, Indonesia, Malaysia, Myanmar, Singapore, and Thailand. Its natural habitat is subtropical or tropical moist lowland forest. It is threatened by habitat loss.
