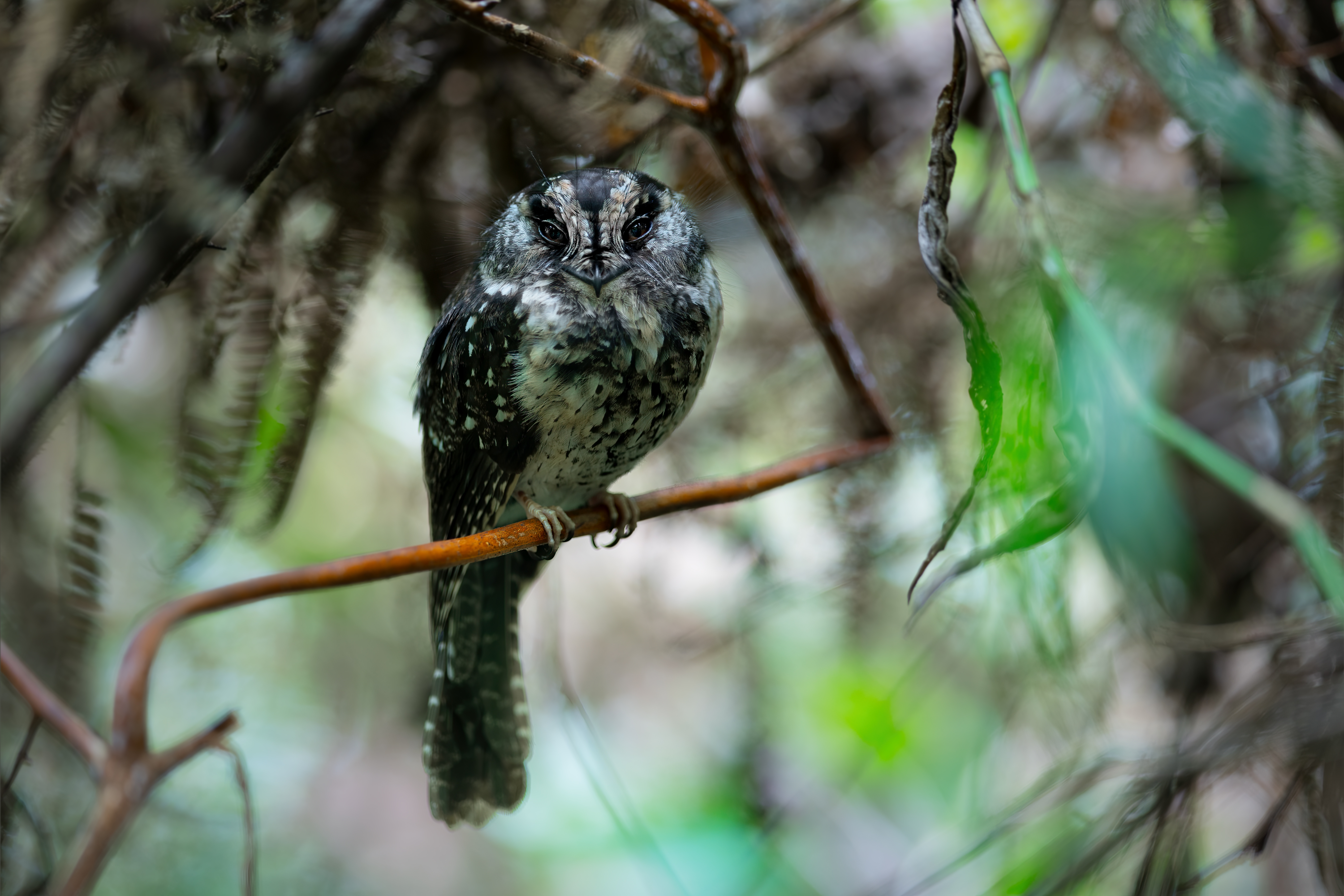

Conservation status
- Least Concern (IUCN 3.1)

Scientific classification
- Kingdom: Animalia
- Phylum: Chordata
- Class: Aves
- Clade: Strisores
- Order: Aegotheliformes
- Family: Aegothelidae
- Genus: Aegotheles
- Species: A. albertisi

Binomial name
- Aegotheles albertisi Sclater, PL, 1874
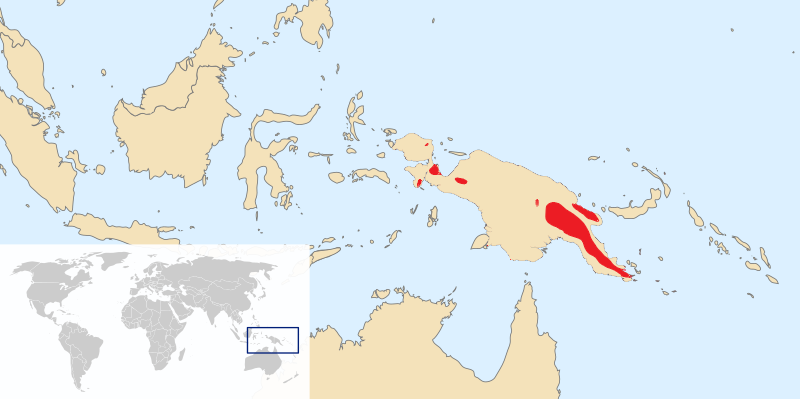

Synonyms
- Aegotheles archboldi

= Mountain owlet-nightjar =

Species of bird

The Mountain owlet-nightjar (Aegotheles albertisi) is a species of bird in the family Aegothelidae. It is found in the highlands of New Guinea. Its natural habitat is subtropical or tropical moist montane forests.

== Taxonomy and origins ==
The Mountain owlet-nightjar belongs to the Aegothelidae family, commonly known as the owlet-nightjars. Aegothelidae contains a single extant genus, Aegotheles, comprising nine extant species (see Moluccan owlet-nightjar, Feline owlet-nightjar, Australian owlet-nightjar, New Caledonian owlet-nightjar, Barred owlet-nightjar, Wallace's owlet-nightjar, Starry owlet-nightjar). There is one known extinct owlet-nightjar, belonging to its own genus, Megaegotheles.

The Mountain owlet-nightjar is most closely related to the Archbold’s Owlet-nightjar (Aegotheles archboldi), with which it forms a superspecies. The two species were previously considered conspecific, then they were designated as sympatric in the Paniai Lakes region. Most recently, Archbold’s Owlet-Nightjar was lumped in with the Mountain Owlet-Nightjar in eBird’s 2022 taxonomy update. In total, four different species and subspecies (A. albertisi albertisi, A. albertisi salvatorii, A. albertisi wondiwoi, A. archboldi) have been included under the Mountain owlet-nightjar, which is now considerred monotypic. The lump is due to plumage variations seen across the four.

== Identification ==
Owlet-nightjars have wide beak bills, short legs, and upright posture. Their eyes are oriented forwards and are protected by an array of whisker-like feathers. The Mountain owlet-nightjar is a small darkish owlet-nightjar, measuring 18–22 cm in length with a wingspan of about 50 cm and a weight of 25-40g. Males and females are similar in size and plumage.

=== Plumage ===
Mountain owlet nightjars exhibits large amounts of plumage variability by individual. Color morphs found in a given population range from dark brown to reddish brown with many intermediate shades present. There exists also a large individual variation in the patterning of the plumage. The variation in plumage has thwarted attempts at classifyong populations into discrete taxa. Individual plumage variation is more inconsistent than geographic plumage variation, making most differences described in subspecies uncertain. The complexity and observed variabilty of plumages likely serves as camouflage against the forest backdrop.

Generally, the upper parts and wing-coverts are rufous brown or brown with greyish-white spots. Juveniles may be more rufous than adults. Buffish lateral crown-stripes and a prominent tawny patch behind each eye. The collar is greyish-white or pale buff, narrow around the hind neck. The sides of the neck and the throat are speckled and barred brown. The underparts are pale buff or whitish, spotted and blotched brown; markings often form a bold V-shape down the breast.

== Habitat and distribution ==
The Mountain Owlet-nightjar is primarily found in the montane forests of New Guinea. They are a species which prefers areas with dense foliage or forest edges. They may also occur in tree-fern savannahs and gardens. They occur at elevations ranging from 1,200 to 2,700 meters. This species prefers to inhabit humid environments, where the climate supports a rich diversity of insect life to support their dietary niche.

== Behaviour and ecology ==
Mountain owlet-nightjars are thought to be nocturnal or possibly crepuscular. During the day they are a cryptic species, likely hiding from predators in tree hollows.

=== Vocalizations ===
The call is described as two to four, but usually three, medium-pitched, slow, somewhat hoarse whistles. The notes are even in pitch or slightly downslurred, with each note a half-tone higher than the preceding. Vocalizations are likely related to displays of aggression (territoriality) or mating behaviours.

=== Diet and foraging ===
The mountain owlet-nightjar is considered to be insectivorous, feeding largely on ground-dwelling arthropods. Analyses of faecal and stomach contents suggest that beetles (Coleoptera) are the preferred prey item of the Mountain owlet-nightjar. Earthworms (Oligochaeta) have been occasionally observed in the diet of the Mountain owlet-nightjar, but only following periods of heavy or prolonged rainfall, suggesting that the Mountain owlet-nightjar opportunistically predates on earthworms when large numbers emerge from the forest floor during such weather events. Owlet-nightjars typically hunt their insect prey in flight or in quick sallies from a perch, but may also chase their prey on the ground.

=== Reproduction ===
Mountain owlet-nightjars are thought to be monogamous like most species in the order Caprimulgiformes are. Both sexes incubate the clutch and participate in rearing chicks more or less evenly. They typically nest and lay their eggs in tree hollows or in other naturally occurring holes and shallow cavities. The exact breeding season of the Mountain owlet-nightjar is unknown, but is speculated to be between April and November. Nestlings have been found in April and May, juveniles found in June and aggressive displays by females have been recorded at known nesting sites in November. The clutch size of this species is one egg with an incubation period of 25-27. The egg is described as being white and not patterned. Chicks are born precocial and are covered in a layer of white protoptile down feathers.

== Status and conservation ==
This species is currently listed as least concern by the IUCN, and was last assessed in 2024. It is suspected that the population is declining. the Mountain owlet-nightjar has a large range which does not approach the threshold under the criterion for range size (less than 20,000 km^{2}). The exact population of this species is unknown, but it is believed to be over the 10,000 individual threshold required to be classified as vulnerable. Despite the downwards trend in population size, the speed of this decline is not believed to be great enough to breach the threshold for vulnerable status (more than 30% decline in ten years or three generations).
