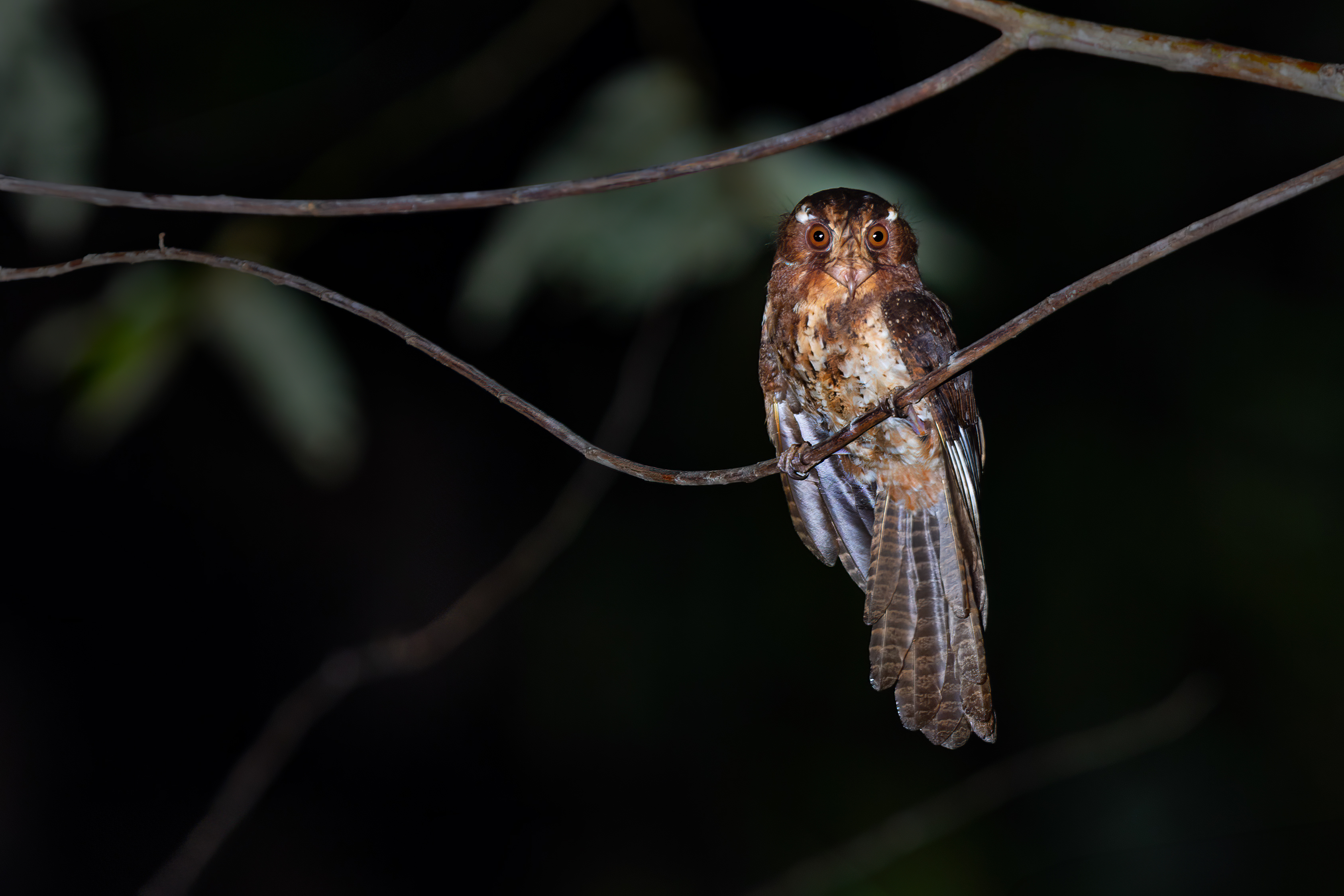

Conservation status
- Least Concern (IUCN 3.1)

Scientific classification
- Kingdom: Animalia
- Phylum: Chordata
- Class: Aves
- Order: Aegotheliformes
- Family: Aegothelidae
- Genus: Aegotheles
- Species: A. crinifrons

Binomial name
- Aegotheles crinifrons (Bonaparte, 1850)

= Moluccan owlet-nightjar =

Species of bird

The Moluccan owlet-nightjar (Aegotheles crinifrons), also known as the long-whiskered owlet-nightjar, is a species of bird in the family Aegothelidae.

It is endemic to the northern Moluccas, where its natural habitats are subtropical or tropical moist lowland forest and subtropical or tropical moist montane forest.

== Taxonomy and systematics ==
=== Taxonomic classification and nomenclature ===
The Moluccan Owlet-Nightjar (scientific name: Aegotheles crinifrons (Bonaparte, 1850)) was first described as Batrachostomus crinifrons by Bonaparte in 1850 , and in 1860 it was described as Batrachostomus psilopterus.

Its main english common name refers to its endemic range in the Northern Moluccas, where it is known as Atoku Maluku in Indonesian. Other English names include Halmahera Owlet-Nightjar, Long-whiskered Owlet-Nightjar (although its facial bristles are relatively short compared with those of other family members, such as A. insignis), and Painted Owlet-Nightjar. The genus name Aegotheles derives from Greek (aix, goat; thelazo, to suckle), while crinifrons derives from Latin (crinis, hair; frons, forehead).

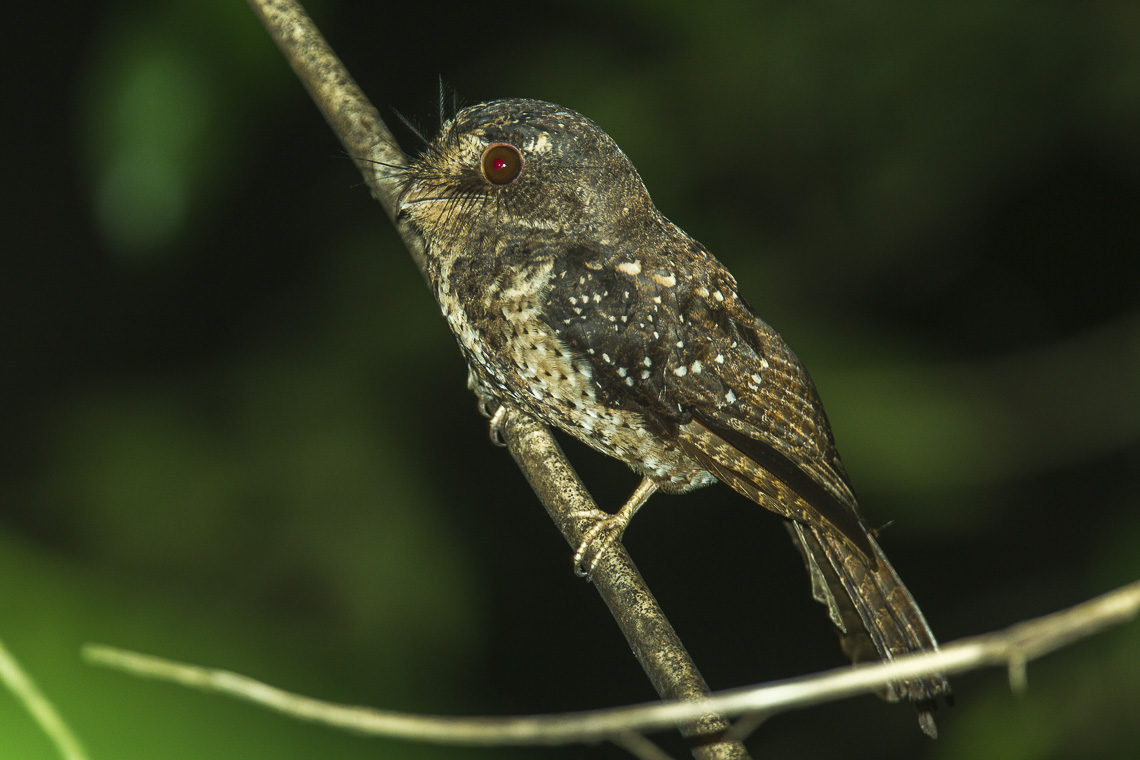
It hunts from horizontal perches in the forest mid-storey, flying out or upwards to catch individual insects in flight. After catching it, it often returns to the same perch.

It is a monotypic species, meaning it has no recognized subspecies.

=== Evolutionary history and phylogenetic position ===
In traditional avian classification, A. crinifrons belongs to the order Caprimulgiformes and the family Aegothelidae. However, recent molecular and anatomical evidence suggests that Aegothelidae may be more closely related to Apodiformes (swifts and hummingbirds) than to other traditional Caprimulgiformes.

This family comprises nine extant species and one extinct species (although no species have been confirmed extinct since the 1600s). Recent molecular phylogenies group the smaller owlet-nightjars (A. cristatus, A. bennettii, A. albertisi, A. archboldi and A. wallacii) together as sister to A. crinifrons.

Like the other two larger owlet-nightjars, A. insignis (Feline Owlet-Nightjar) and the more recently recognized A. tatei (Spangled Owlet-Nightjar), A. crinifrons retains several characteristics considered potentially ancestral within the genus, including its large body size, predominantly rufous plumage and relatively robust bill. Their resemblance to Asian frogmouths (Batrachostomus) may partly reflect convergent adaptations to similar rainforest lifestyles.

=== Relationship with related species ===
Some literature considers the Moluccan Owlet-Nightjar an allospecies within the Large Owlet-Nightjar group. It was once suggested that A. crinifrons and the two other larger species mentioned above should be grouped in the genus Euaegotheles. This proposal was based on their larger body size (some authors even divided the family into two size classes between larger and smaller species) and other shared morphological characteristics. One of their main distinctive shared traits is their rufous juvenile plumage (Juvenile plumage is unknown in the fourth large owlet-nightjar, A. savesi.). However, this does not necessarily mean they diverged and evolved separately from the rest of the family; it could simply be an ancestral trait that was lost in the smaller owlet-nightjars.

Despite their similarities, this classification was abandoned because the proposed morphological and osteological differences between the two groups were not sufficiently supported. For example, the supposed differences in skeletal anatomy and oil gland size do not appear to exist. Similarly, the frontal bristles and tarsus, which some authors claimed differed between Aegotheles and Euaegotheles, show no significant differences.

In addition to the morphological evidence, current molecular evidence supports retaining all living owlet-nightjars in a single genus, Aegotheles.

=== Extinct relatives ===
The family Aegothelidae includes one known extinct species, Megaegotheles novaezealandiae, a New Zealand owlet-nightjar known from Quaternary fossil deposits extending into the Holocene. Another owlet-nightjar, Aegotheles savesi, endemic to New Caledonia, is considered possibly extinct. It is known from a single specimen collected in 1880 and fossil remains.

== Description ==
=== General appearance and adult plumage ===
Aegotheles crinifrons is a relatively large owlet-nightjar, approximately 26–31 cm in length. As previously mentioned, it is one of the largest members of the family Aegothelidae.

The main characteristic of the species' general appearance is its colour polymorphism. Two main colour morphs have been observed, brown and rufous, connected by intermediate forms. However, the limited number of available specimens makes it difficult to determine whether these morphs are equally represented in both sexes, (as in closely related species such as A. insignis, where both sexes exhibit similar colour morphs connected by intermediates), or whether rufous individuals are predominantly females or immatures. Some literature identifies the intermediate morph as female. Nevertheless, there is no clear evidence of sexual dimorphism in the species.

The brown morph is characterised by predominantly brown upperparts, finely vermiculated with greyish-brown markings. The underparts are buffish-brown, speckled and spotted dark brown, becoming paler towards the belly. In contrast, the rufous morph is paler and plainer, with predominantly rufescent-tawny upperparts and breast. White or buff spots are particularly noticeable on the wing-coverts and underparts. The intermediate morph is described as having a blackish-chestnut crown and rufous upperparts, with faint dark and light vermiculations on some feathers. The wing-coverts are finely barred chestnut and blackish-brown, with whitish to buff spots and edged in black. The underparts are predominantly buff, with rufous to chestnut colouring on the breast, variable thin blackish streaks and ill-defined whitish to pale buff spots, mainly on the belly.

Three broad, pale buff vertical bands on the chest, separated by two dark bands, are considered distinctive markings of the species. It also appears to have white spots on the back and dark, arrowhead-shaped markings on the chest.

Finally, descriptions of the bare parts are also heavily reliant on museum specimens rather than observations of living birds: they appear to have brown irises, a brownish bill, and brownish-straw legs and feet.

=== Immature plumage and moult ===
Regarding the juvenile plumage, A. crinifrons shares a distinctive plain rufous plumage with A. insignis and A. tatei. This plumage lacks the vermiculations characteristic of adults and, as mentioned previously, it’s considered a distinctive feature of the three larger owlet-nightjars. The juvenile plumage has also been observed to have remiges more raised than in later plumages, and with larger terminal white spots. There is no information currently available on downy young plumage.

Despite there being little information available on the moult for this species, one specimen collected in early June was undergoing a complete moult, with new brown feathers replacing old rufous ones. It has also been observed that the remiges appear to be retained during the moult from juvenile to the first basic adult plumage . Tail moult seems to follow a centrifugal sequence, starting with the central feathers and progressing outwards.

=== Vocalizations ===
The Moluccan owlet-nightjar can display a wide variety of distinctive calls, including manic screams, cackles and cat-like yowls. Its vocalizations are considered quite different from those of other owlet-nightjars, and they can be heard throughout the night, particularly around dusk and dawn.

Its territorial or advertising call is its most frequently heard vocalization. It’s a moderately weak, upslurred squeal or scream, immediately followed by three shorter, unhurried screams at approximately the same pitch. It’s also described as a laugh-like call, making 3-5 “kaah” notes, sometimes followed by a high-pitched shrill “ke-ahh”.The entire sequence lasts around 1.5 seconds. Other individuals may respond with louder or faster versions of the call. Hearing this call is the easiest way for ornithologists to identify the Moluccan owlet-nightjar.

When disturbed, it produces a series of alarm calls, described as loud, maniacal screams or a cat-like yowling call, as well as a series of screams and moans.

=== Field identification ===
In order to visually identify the Moluccan owlet-nightjar in the field, it’s important to take into account its size and general appearance. As previously stated, it’s a large, brownish or rufescent owlet-nightjar. At rest, it can be recognized by its buff lateral crown stripes, spotted wing-coverts and distinctive chest markings. It also lacks a collar around the hindneck. In flight, it is characterized by relatively weak, fluttering wingbeats (like the other members of their family, they have paddle-shaped wings that allow them to fly short distances in well-vegetated habitats). Both sexes lack white markings on the wings and tail.

Since it is the only owlet-nightjar occurring in the Moluccas, its identification is relatively straightforward within its range. The main potential confusions could happen with sympatric owls (Otus magicus, Ninox squamipila and Ninox connivens) and nightjars (Caprimulgus indicus and Caprimulgus macrurus) as well as frogmouths (Podargidae).

=== Similar species ===
- Feline Owlet-Nightjar (A. insignis): Found in New Guinea. One of its closest morphological relatives, sharing the large body size and predominantly rufous plumage. However, it differs in details of colouration and facial bristle length.
- Starry Owlet-Nightjar (A. tatei): Another large member of the genus, also sharing the distinctive rufous juvenile plumage.
- New Caledonian Owlet-Nightjar (A. savesi): Known from a single museum specimen. It is brown with greyish-white barring throughout its plumage.
- Asian Frogmouths (family Podargidae): Although not closely resembling them in every respect, the Moluccan Owlet-Nightjar shares similarities in body shape, facial structure, broad bill and facial bristles.
- Other nightjars (family Caprimulgidae): Shares several general characteristics, including nocturnal habits, cryptic plumage and facial bristles.

== Distribution and habitat ==
=== Geographic distribution ===
The Moluccan Owlet-Nightjar is endemic to the Northern Moluccas (North Maluku), Indonesia. It specifically occurs on three islands: Halmahera, Kasiruta and Bacan (also known as Batjan).

It is the only owlet-nightjar occurring in the Moluccas, and it’s presumably a sedentary bird. Until relatively recently, information about its distribution and abundance was limited, partly because museum specimens are scarce. However, it was reported as common on Halmahera during surveys in 1994 and 1996.

Its range extends across different forested areas, from coastal habitats to montane regions, occurring from approximately 0 to 1,250 m on Halmahera and up to 1,800 m on Bacan.

There is little evidence of migration in the species or the whole Aeogothelidae family, although some dispersal of young individuals could sometimes occur. The appearance of owlet-nightjars on the Maluku Islands suggests that the birds may have migrated long distances in the past. On the other hand, this may indicate that they arrived on these islands when the islands themselves were located closer to the continent.

=== Ecological habitat ===
It primarily inhabits lowland and foothill forests, including primary forests, mature secondary forests, lightly logged forests and forest edges. Despite that, it seems to show a certain degree of habitat adaptability, occurring in lightly wooded cultivated areas and coconut plantations, showing its ability to tolerate habitat disturbance.

== Behaviour and ecology ==
=== Feeding ecology ===
The Moluccan Owlet-nightjar is considered a generalist and a carnivore, specifically an insectivore, meaning that it feeds on small flying insects.

To catch his prey, it employs the sallying technique: it hunts from horizontal perches in the forest mid-storey, flying out or upwards to catch individual insects in flight. After catching it, it often returns to the same perch. It can also hover-glean; hover near vegetation to capture insects from leaves. Besides hunting, other members of the family have been observed to drink water at dawn and dusk by flying down and squatting at the water’s edge, but this has not been observed for this particular species.

A. crinifrons' body is adapted to its feeding method, presenting rounded wings and relatively high wing loading which are associated with this type of perch-based hunting. Just like all other owlet-nightjars, it does not use its feet to capture prey.

Its foraging is mainly nocturnal, although activity may increase around dusk and dawn. Some Caprimulgiformes reduce or cease aerial hunting during the darkest hours and become more active on moonlit nights, given that hunting by sight may be constrained by low light levels. Despite that, since A. crinifrons uses the sallying technique it may be able to hunt more easily in the darkness than other similar species where both bird and prey are at flight most of the time. Although not directly observed in A. crinifrons, it may also be inferred from the behaviour of similar Caprimulgiformes that it may present a well-developed ear to help it hunt.

=== Behaviour and social organisation ===
The species is considered primarily nocturnal, although some sources describe it as crepuscular. Its calls can be heard throughout much of the night, and it is in fact more often heard than seen.

Although its social behaviour has not been studied in depth, it’s considered to usually occur singly or in pairs, occasionally in small groups of 3–5 individuals, possibly family groups. At night, two or three birds may perch close together and call loudly.

Taking into account the behaviour of the whole Aegothelidae family, it is possible that it roosts in tree cavities, and it may use several holes within its territory, in rotation. It could also occur that the species is reluctant to perch in exposed positions during daylight, potentially because of predation risk, and when disturbed it would usually move directly from one roost hole to another. Again, this behaviour has not been explicitly observed in this particular owlet-nightjar, but it seems to be fairly common in other species of the family.

=== Reproductive biology ===
The age of first breeding for the Moluccan owlet-nightjar seems to be between the first and second year of age, and it doesn’t show colonial or lekking behaviour.

The nest of A. crinifrons has not been described and apparently remains unknown. As previously mentioned, Owlet-nightjars generally nest in tree cavities, sometimes with a small amount of nesting material such as a mound of leaves. Their eggs are generally white and unmarked, consistent with cavity nesting. It’s believed this practice provides them with protection from predators. No courtship or aggressive displays have been recorded for owlet-nightjars, apart from nest defence. It’s hypothesized that vocal communication may be particularly important, given the absence of the conspicuous white wing and tail markings found in other nightjars.

Again, there isn’t any species specific information regarding reproductive strategy for the Moluccan owlet-nightjar. From family level information, it could be inferred that they produce one brood per year, although replacement clutches may be laid if the first clutch is lost. Clutch size is very variable among the family, and monogamy appears to be established in the Australian Owlet-Nightjar, but its prevalence across the family remains uncertain.

The developmental mode and incubation period of A. crinifrons are unknown. For comparison, the much more studied Australian Owlet-Nightjar (A. cristatus) has a semi-altricial developmental mode, an incubation period of approximately 27 days (the standard for the family is 25-27) and a fledging period of approximately 26 days.

=== Predation and biological threats ===
No specific predators of A. crinifrons have been identified yet. Potential predators of owlet-nightjars, based on information about related species, include:

- Birds of prey, particularly hawks, falcons and owls.
- Predatory mammals.
- Reptiles, including large lizards and snakes, although documented predation by reptiles appears rare.
- Domestic cats, reported as predators of the Australian Owlet-Nightjar.

The order Caprimulgiformes is also vulnerable to a series of different types of parasites, but none are known to target A. crinifrons specifically.

To protect itself from predation, the species has cryptic plumage that probably helps reduce detection by predators. The alleged roosting in tree cavities can also provide shelter and protection. Additionally, some related species, such as the Australian Owlet-Nightjar, can enter torpor during periods of food scarcity, but there is no evidence whether A. crinifrons does or doesn’t partake in this practice too.

== In culture ==
=== Owlet-nightjars and folklore ===
The Moluccan Owlet-Nightjar, just like all other members of its family, has been historically associated with superstition. The order Caprimulgiformes is linked to the ancient belief, dating back to Aristotle, that nightjars sucked milk from goats at night, hence the name goatsuckers. The genus name Aegotheles derives from the Greek equivalent of goatsucker, reflecting this historical association.

Other historical beliefs included the idea that nightjars carried their eggs in their mouths or had an antipathy towards snakes.

=== Local naming and folkloric beliefs ===
In Indonesia, the Moluccan Owlet-Nightjar is well known in different communities. Among the Tobelo, a West Papuan-speaking ethnic group from Halmahera, the Moluccan Owlet-Nightjar has a specific vernacular name: o hohonotoko itoka-tokara, meaning "red hohonotoko". The name hohonotoko is thought to derive from the word honotoko, meaning "chisel", possibly referring to the chisel-like shape of these birds in flight, and it’s used to refer to both the Moluccan owlet-nightjar and the Large-tailed Nightjar (Caprimulgus macrurus). The additional expression itoka-tokara distinguishes the “reddish” Moluccan Owlet-Nightjar from the other bird.

In Buli communities on Halmahera, certain birds are associated with supernatural beings known as gua, which are simultaneously understood as witch spirits and birds. These beings are conventionally associated with three auditory manifestations: kokók, cokaéko and ngangá. The latter has been tentatively identified by anthropologist Nils Bubandt as the Moluccan Owlet-Nightjar, although the identification is not definitive. The identification is based on its “maniacal blood-curdling cackle”, which are interpreted as signs that a gua is prowling. They are believed to foreshadow illness or death in the village and even the cessation of calling can be interpreted as a sign of the spirit's presence. Bubandt also describes how villagers challenged him to capture a ngangá so they could witness its transformation into a human spirit. However, none were willing to help him capture one.

Other local communities also similarly fear this bird, attributing its sound to a ghost or malevolent spirit called “suwanggi”.

=== Significance of vocalizations ===
Bird vocalizations can become embedded in culture as some kind of meaningful signal. In some rural communities in Indonesia, different types of calls are associated with different ideas. A study on the matter classified the Moluccan Owlet-Nightjar’s call as a “Sad” sound type, and it stated its cultural meaning is “Time to rest”. This is similar to how the call of another Caprimulgiforme, the Whip-poor-will, was reportedly disliked by North American children because it meant it was time to go to bed. Going back to Indonesian culture, when the calls of nocturnal species such as A. crinifrons are heard during the daytime they may be perceived as unusual events associated with environmental disturbances, such as strong winds, falling trees or floods.

=== Contact with humans ===
Despite its endemic status and cultural significance, A. crinifrons remains relatively poorly known. Its nocturnal habits and elusive behaviour make it difficult to observe, which may explain why it is not typically a high priority among birdwatchers. It has been observed to respond to imitations of its calls, which could make it relatively easy to find, but its shy nature and the fact that it’s easily disturbed make observing it more complicated. For example, a bird survey in North Maluku failed to record the species, attributing its absence from the observations to its nocturnal habits. Therefore, even local communities may have limited direct knowledge of their biology. Modern techniques such as acoustic recording, playback, radio-tracking and night-vision equipment could improve our understanding of the species.

== Conservation ==
The Moluccan Owlet-Nightjar is listed in the IUCN Red List as a Least Concern (LC) species, even though it is stated that it shows decreasing population trends. Consequently, despite its restricted distribution in the Northern Moluccas, the species is not currently considered globally threatened. Currently, it is not legally protected by Indonesian regulations, although its occurrence in existing and proposed protected areas may offer some degree of habitat protection.

Its abundance has been described differently across sources, ranging from locally uncommon to common. Although historically poorly known, some observations suggest that the species may be more common than previously assumed. Records include observations in the proposed Aketajawe protected area (now part of Aketajawe-Lolobata National Park) and the proposed Gunung Gamkonora protected area. Its occurrence in at least one existing reserve and one proposed protected area has been reported as encouraging for its conservation.

The main potential threat for the species is deforestation. Like other forest-dwelling birds in the region, A. crinifrons is potentially threatened by ongoing forest loss. Nevertheless, the species has also been recorded along forest edges and in degraded environments, meaning it could have a certain amount of tolerance towards environmental disturbance, reducing its immediate vulnerability.

A study estimated a 25.07% loss of forest cover over a ten-year period in Northern Maluku and an 18.57% reduction in the species' total range between 1990 and 2003. These findings suggest that, despite its apparent tolerance of some habitat disturbance, continued deforestation could threaten its long-term persistence. In consequence, this study proposed changing the Moluccan owlet-nightjar's conservation status from Least Concern (LC) to Near Threatened (NT).

Finally, further surveys and improved knowledge of its distribution, abundance, habitat requirements and vocalizations are important for assessing its current conservation needs.
