= Karimui owlet-nightjar =

Scientific classification
- Kingdom: Animalia
- Phylum: Chordata
- Class: Aves
- Order: Aegotheliformes
- Family: Aegothelidae
- Genus: Aegotheles
- Species: A. terborghi

Binomial name
- Aegotheles terborghi Diamond, 1967

Species of bird

The Karimui owlet-nightjar (Aegotheles terborghi) is a nocturnal bird local to Mount Karimui and the surrounding Karimui Basin in the Eastern Highlands of Papua New Guinea. Belonging to the owlet-nightjar family Aegothelidae in the order Aegotheliformes, this species is extremely poorly known and was discovered from a single specimen collected in 1964 by Jared Diamond and John Terborgh. It was later rediscovered in the wild in 2016 during an expedition on the north-east ridge of Mount Karimui. The species differs from other owlet-nightjars by its significantly larger size and darker upperparts.

== Taxonomy ==
The Karimui owlet-nightjar was first formally described in 1967 by American scientist Jared Diamond based on a single male specimen that had been collected in 1964 in the Karimui basin of the Eastern Highlands of Papua New Guinea. A local man caught the individual roosting on a branch and captured it by hand, noticing its differences compared to other owlet-nightjars. It was offered to the researchers during their expedition. The specific epithet terborghi was chosen to honour the co-discoverer of the bird, American ecologist John Terborgh, coining the term Aegotheles bennettii terborghi. The specimen now serves as the species holotype and is preserved at the Museum of Comparative Zoology.

=== Species and subspecies status ===
Originally, the bird was classified as a subspecies of the lowland barred owlet-nightjar (Aegotheles bennettii) due to overall similarities in plumage markings. However, an mRNA study published in 2003 revealed that terborghi is genetically closer to the Vogelkop owlet-nightjar (Aegotheles affinis), a montane race restricted to the distant Arfak Mountains. The DNA analysis demonstrated an 8.4% sequence divergence between the affinis/terborghi lineage and bennettii populations, a genetic distance typically indicating separate species in birds. Also, terborghi and affinis differ from each other by 2.5% sequence divergence and are separated geographically 1,300 km (810 mi) along New Guinea's Central Range, geographically dividing the species and supporting the idea of terborghi being its own species.

Due to these conflicting physical and genetic findings and the little knowledge about the Karimui owlet-nightjar, major taxonomic authorities currently classify the bird under different statuses:

- Clements Checklist / Birds of the World : elevates it to a distinct, monotypic species (Aegotheles terborghi) based on its high genetic divergence and geographic isolation.
- Handbook of the Birds of the World and BirdLife International: Classifies it as Aegotheles affinis terborghi, a subspecies of the Vogelkop owlet-nightjar. While the original Handbook of Birds of the World volume (1999) listed it as a subspecies of A. bennettii, later editions updated its placement after the genetic findings from 2003.
- Birds of New Guinea (Beehler & Pratt, 2016): Retains it as Aegotheles bennettii terborghi, a subspecies of the barred owlet-nightjar until further field voice recordings and tissue samples are recorded.

== Description ==
The Karimui owlet-nightjar is a small to medium sized nocturnal bird with an upright posture, featuring an owl-like facial disc with large, forward-facing eyes. The upper parts are dark gray-brown to blackish, noticeably darker than those of related owlet-nightjars. The back and upper wing coverts are marked with white freckling forming a distinct, regular transverse barred pattern. The head has a broad black crown stripe extending between the eyes and thick black eyebrows that wrap around the head. Long, specialized rictal bristles (feathers similar to facial "whiskers") are present around the bill and head, suspected to function as sensors for navigating dark tree holes or guiding prey. The underparts are pale grayish to white-buff with light chevron markings and show significantly less breast patterns than other taxa.

=== Physical measurements ===
Due to the rarity of this species, all physical measurements are derived from the male holotype (MCZ 286269) caught in 1964. Its measurements record a wing length of 154 mm (6.1 in) and a tail length of 142 mm (5.6 in). While there are no female terborghi dimension records, female owlet-nightjars average slightly larger than males. These dimensions show that the Karimui owlet-nightjar is significantly bigger than mainland races of the barred owlet-nightjar (Aegotheles bennettii), which show male wing lengths between 114–128 mm (4.5–5.0 in) and tail lengths of 99–110 mm (3.9–4.3 in)}.

=== Anatomical adaptations ===
In internal anatomy and bone studies, the Karimui owlet-nightjar shares the same defining characteristics of the family Aegothelidae. These include: a broad, short bill with white nostrils near the tip, a modern skull connection (no basipterygoid processes) but a primitive skull structure (desmognathous palate). Unlike true nightjars, the owlet-nightjars do not have pouches in their intestines (intestinal caeca) nor produce special dust-like feathers (powder down), but they do have a naked oil gland that makes oil for feather maintenance. The legs and feet are relatively small and weak.

== Habitat and distribution ==
The Karimui owlet-nightjar is endemic to Mount Karimui and its surrounding Karimui Basin in Chimbu Province, Papua New Guinea. The basin is a flat intermontane plain at an elevation several thousand feet lower than most of the surrounding ring of mountain ridges which can rise up to 9,000 ft (2,700 m), effectively cutting off the basin from the mountains. This steep difference in elevation around the basin isolated the lowland bird populations, acting as a "tropical isolation" that drove localized evolution and speciation in localized forms like terborghi.

=== Elevation distribution ===
Unlike lowland owlet-nightjars, the Karimui owlet-nightjar appears to be a submontane specialist recorded between 3,650 and 5,150 ft (1,110 and 1,570 m) elevation. The male holotype from 1964 was collected at 3,650 ft (1,110 m) near Karimui station. In 2016, researchers relocated the species higher up at 5,150 ft (1,570 m) on an unexplored north-east ridge of Mount Karimui. In comparison, the barred and Vogelkop owlet-nightjars are lowland birds, with A. bennettii inhabiting forests from sea level up to 3,690 ft (1,120 m), and A. affinis inhabiting forests a bit higher in elevation, ranging between 260 and 4,920 ft (79 and 1,500 m).

=== Specific habitat requirements ===
This species is strictly dependent on primary, undisturbed submontane tropical rainforests. As it is nocturnal, the bird spends the day roosting inside natural tree cavities or hollows of mature forest trees. When disturbed during its rest, it hurries to a nearby open branch to perch upright or seeks shelter in adjacent tree holes. Like all members of the Aegothelidae family, it is non-migratory and remains within its forest range year-round.

=== Habitat threats and forest status ===
The rainforest below about 4,500 ft (1,400 m) around the Karimui village has been heavily cleared and fragmented by coffee plantations and small-scale subsistence farming. Due to the rarity of the Karimui owlet-nightjar, it is not possible to disclose if this has seriously affected its conservation status. Intact primary submontane forests persist and are still healthy on the upper slopes of mount Karimui, which could potentially explain why the later sighting in 2016 occurred in this higher, undisturbed zone.

== Behavior ==
The Karimui owlet-nightjar is a discrete, strictly nocturnal, and non-migratory bird. During the day, it roosts inside natural tree cavities of mature primary rainforest trees. The first observation of this bird was when a local man who stumbled onto the bird resting in plain daylight, captured it by hand and offered it to researchers. Therefore, its only long field observation is from 2016, when researchers observed an individual after a local guide pulled at rattan vines growing near a tree cavity. The group was able to follow and observe the bird around for nearly an hour, getting the first photographs of the species in the wilderness and audio recordings. During the hour-long observation, the bird initially flushed and perched to a nearby open branch, then moved between different perches and briefly entered a second tree hole.

=== Vocalizations ===
From the 2016 field observation, researchers obtained a tentative audio recording of an owlet-nightjar call approximately 15 m (49 ft) from the tree they had observed the specimen on. The bird vocalized as it flew into the distance, and the sound recording was archived at the Cornell Lab of Ornithology's Macaulay Library. Because the bird was vocalizing in the dark and was not visually observed while calling, the identification is treated as tentative.

In the related Barred owlet-nightjar, calls are described as a deep trill or a descending hollow "churr" or "chiirr". A similar "churr" call is given by the more known Australian owlet-nightjar (Aegotheles cristatus) year-round by both sexes and serve as territorial advertising and defense.

=== Diet and feeding ===
Nothing has been published yet regarding the specific diet or foraging behavior of the Karimui owlet-nightjar. Based on the diet of other members of the family Aegothelidae, the species is presumed to be entirely insectivorous. Owlet-nightjars capture insects using diverse methods including aerial hawking or from perches, plucking prey from foliage or hard surfaces without landing, and terrestrial hunting for ants and sometimes earthworms on the forest floor. The elongated, whisker-like facial bristles around the bill are thought to help direct flying insects into the mouth during flight or act as tactile sensors inside dark tree holes.

=== Reproduction and breeding ===
Similarly to the Karimui owlet-nightjar's diet, nothing has been published about its specific nesting sites, clutch size, egg dimensions, and parental care. However, some information can be inferred from the nesting habits of other owlet-nightjar species. They nest inside natural tree hollows and their clutches typically consist of 3 to 4 unmarked, white eggs laid at intervals of 1 to 2 days. Incubation is primarily conducted by the female (possibly shared by the male) over 25 to 27 days, starting when the first egg is laid. Nestlings hatch covered in white first down and are brooded until their eyes open on day 4 or 5. A gray second down grows by day 11 or 12, after which both parents share nocturnal hunting duties, feeding the young during the first half of the night. Nestlings beg using a low trilling call and fledge after a total nesting period of 21 to 29 days.
