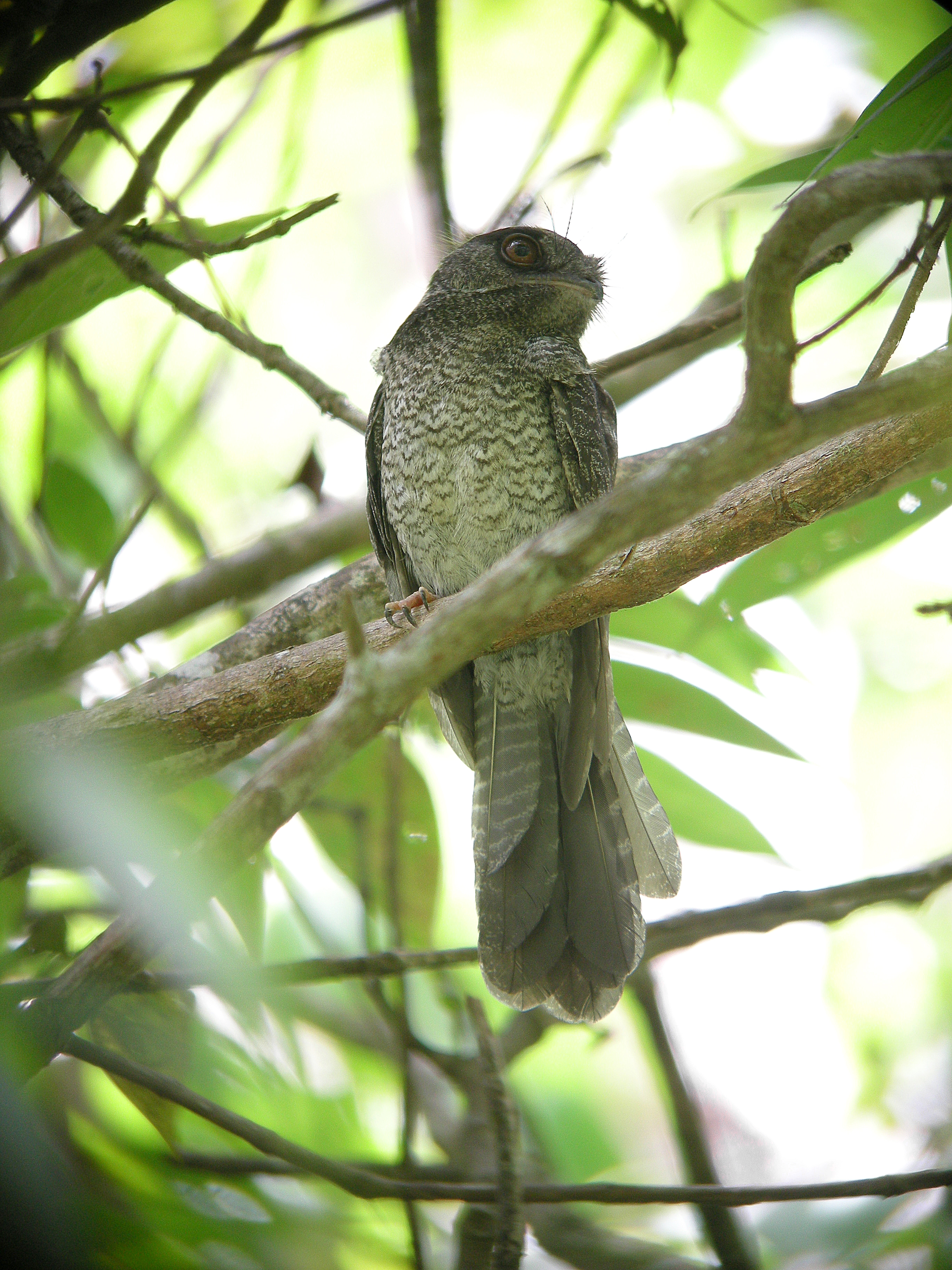
- Barred owlet-nightjar (Aegotheles bennettii)

Scientific classification
- Kingdom: Animalia
- Phylum: Chordata
- Class: Aves
- Clade: Daedalornithes
- Order: Aegotheliformes; Worthy et al., 2007
- Family: Aegothelidae; Bonaparte, 1853
- Genus: Aegotheles; Vigors & Horsfield, 1827

Type species
- Caprimulgus novaehollandiae Latham, 1790

Synonyms
- Euaegotheles Mathews, 1918; Megaegotheles Scarlett, 1968

= Owlet-nightjar =

Owlet-nightjars Temporal range: Early Miocene to present

Genus of birds

Owlet-nightjars are small crepuscular birds related to the nightjars and frogmouths. Most are native to New Guinea, but some species extend to Australia, the Moluccas, and New Caledonia. A flightless species from New Zealand is extinct. There is a single monotypic family Aegothelidae with the genus Aegotheles.

Owlet-nightjars are insectivores which hunt mostly in the air but sometimes on the ground; their soft plumage is a cryptic mixture of browns and paler shades, they have fairly small, weak feet (but larger and stronger than those of a frogmouth or a nightjar), a tiny bill that opens extraordinarily wide, surrounded by prominent whiskers. The wings are short, with 10 primaries and about 11 secondaries; the tail long and rounded.

== Taxonomy ==
The genus Aegotheles was introduced in 1827 by the naturalists Nicholas Vigors and Thomas Horsfield to accommodate a single species, Caprimulgus novaehollandiae Latham, 1790. This binomial name is considered to be a junior synonym of Caprimulgus cristatus, the Australian owlet-nightjar that was introduced by George Shaw earlier in 1790. The genus name means "nightjar" or "goatsucker" from Ancient Greek αιξ/aix, αιγος/aigos meaning "goat" and θηλαζω/thēlazō meaning "to suckle". The family Aegothelidae was introduced (as subfamily Aegothelinae within the family Caprimulgidae) in 1853 by the French naturalist Charles Lucien Bonaparte.

A comprehensive 2003 study analyzing mtDNA sequences of Cytochrome b and ATPase subunit 8 suggests that 12 living species of owlet-nightjar should be recognized, as well as another that became extinct early in the second millennium AD.

The relationship between the owlet-nightjars and the (traditional) Caprimulgiformes has long been controversial and obscure and remains so today: in the 19th century they were regarded as a subfamily of the frogmouths, and they are still generally considered to be related to the frogmouths and/or the nightjars. It appears though that they are not as closely related to either as previously thought, and that the owlet-nightjars share a more recent common ancestor with the Apodiformes. As has been suggested on occasion since morphological studies of the cranium in the 1960s, they are thus considered a distinct order, Aegotheliformes. This, the caprimulgiform lineage(s), and the Apodiformes, are postulated to form a clade called Cypselomorphae, with the owlet-nightjars and the Apodiformes forming the clade Daedalornithes.

In form and habits, however, they are very similar to both caprimulgiform group – or, at first glance, to small owls with huge eyes. The ancestors of the swifts and hummingbirds, two groups of birds which are morphologically very specialized, seem to have looked very similar to a small owlet-nightjar, possessing strong legs and a wide gape, while the legs and feet are very reduced in today's swifts and hummingbirds, and the bill is narrow in the latter.

Owlet-nightjars are an exclusively Australasian group, but close relatives apparently thrived all over Eurasia in the late Paleogene.

Molecular phylogenetic studies have shown the Aegotheliformes are sister to the Apodiformes containing the hummingbirds, swifts and treeswifts. The two orders shared a common ancestor around 57 million years ago.

- Strisores
  - Caprimulgiformes
    Caprimulgidae (nightjars)
  - - - Steatornithiformes
        Steatornithidae (oilbird)
      - Nyctibiiformes
        Nyctibiidae (potoos)
    - - Podargiformes
        Podargidae (frogmouths)
      - - Aegotheliformes
          Aegothelidae (owlet-nightjars)
        - Apodiformes
          - Trochilidae (hummingbirds)
          - - Apodidae (swifts)
            - Hemiprocnidae (treeswifts)

The following cladogram is based on a 2003 molecular phylogenetic study that sampled three regions of mitochondrial DNA mainly extracted from museum specimens. Some of the nodes were not well supported by the data.

- Aegotheles
  - New Caledonian owlet-nightjar, Aegotheles savesi
  - - - Feline owlet-nightjar, Aegotheles insignis
      - Starry owlet-nightjar, Aegotheles tatei
    - - Moluccan owlet-nightjar, Aegotheles crinifrons
      - - - Australian owlet-nightjar, Aegotheles cristatus
          - - Barred owlet-nightjar, Aegotheles bennettii
            - - Vogelkop owlet-nightjar, Aegotheles affinis
              - Karimui owlet-nightjar, Aegotheles terborghi
        - - Wallace's owlet-nightjar, Aegotheles wallacii
          - Mountain owlet-nightjar, Aegotheles albertisi

== Species ==
The IOC World Bird List (version 15.1) lists ten species of Aegotheliformes:

- Feline owlet-nightjar, Aegotheles insignis – montane New Guinea
- Starry owlet-nightjar, Aegotheles tatei – Fly/Elevala area of central east New Guinea and Amazon Bay area of far southeast New Guinea
- Moluccan owlet-nightjar, Aegotheles crinifrons – Halmahera and Bacan Islands (north Moluccas)
- Wallace's owlet-nightjar, Aegotheles wallacii – Waigeo (Raja Ampat Islands, northwest of New Guinea), Aru Islands (southwest of New Guinea), Bird's Head Peninsula (northwest New Guinea) and patchily in New Guinea
- Mountain owlet-nightjar, Aegotheles albertisi – montane New Guinea
- New Caledonian owlet-nightjar, Aegotheles savesi – Grande Terre (New Caledonia); likely extinct
- Barred owlet-nightjar, Aegotheles bennettii – central to southeast New Guinea
- Vogelkop owlet-nightjar, Aegotheles affinis –Arfak Mountains, Bird's Head Peninsula (northwest New Guinea)
- Karimui owlet-nightjar, Aegotheles terborghi – Karimui Basin (central south New Guinea)
- Australian owlet-nightjar, Aegotheles cristatus – central south, southeast New Guinea, Australia and Tasmania

A fossil proximal right tarsometatarsus (MNZ S42800) was found at the Bannockburn Formation of the Manuherikia Group near the Manuherikia River in Otago, New Zealand. Dating from the Early to Middle Miocene (Altonian, 19–16 million years ago), it seems to represent an owlet-nightjar ancestral to A. novaezealandiae. In 2022, an additional specimen from the same locality was described by Worthy et al. as a new extinct species of Aegotheles, A. zealandivetus. The holotype specimen is NMNZ S.52917, a distal right tarsometatarsus.

== Summary of species ==
| Common name | Binomial name | Population | Status | Trend | Notes | Range | Image |
|---|---|---|---|---|---|---|---|
| New Zealand owlet-nightjar | Aegotheles novaezealandiae | 0 | EX | - | Thought to have gone extinct in the 1400s | | |
| New Caledonian owlet-nightjar | Aegotheles savesi | 1-49 | CR | ? | Last confirmed sighting occurred in 1913, with a potential sighting in 1998. May be extinct. | | |
| Vogelkop owlet-nightjar | Aegotheles affinis | unknown | NT | ▼ | | | |
| Mountain owlet-nightjar | Aegotheles albertisi | unknown | LC | ▼ | | | |
| Barred owlet-nightjar | Aegotheles bennettii | unknown | LC | ▼ | IOC taxonomy splits an additional species, the Karimui owlet-nightjar (Aegotheles terborghi) from this species. | | |
| Moluccan owlet-nightjar | Aegotheles crinifrons | unknown | LC | ▼ | | | |
| Australian owlet-nightjar | Aegotheles cristatus | unknown | LC | Steady | | | |
| Feline owlet-nightjar | Aegotheles insignis | unknown | LC | ▼ | | | |
| Starry owlet-nightjar | Aegotheles tatei | unknown | LC | ▼ | | | |
| Wallace's owlet-nightjar | Aegotheles wallacii | unknown | LC | ▼ | | | |

== Sources ==
- Mayr, Gerald (2002): Osteological evidence for paraphyly of the avian order Caprimulgiformes (nightjars and allies). J. Ornithol. 143(1): 82–97. doi:10.1007/BF02465461 PDF fulltext
- Simonetta, A.M. (1967): Cinesi e morfologia del cranio negli Uccelli non passeriformi. Studio su varie tendenze evolutive. Part II – Striges, Caprimulgiformes ed Apodiformes ["Cranial kinesis and morphology of non-passerine birds. Study of various evolutionary tendencies. Part II – Striges, Caprimulgiformes and Apodiformes"]. [In Italian] Archivio Zoologico Italiano 52: 1–35.
- Worthy, Trevor H.; Tennyson, A.J.D.; Jones, C.; McNamara, J.A. & Douglas, B.J. (2007): Miocene waterfowl and other birds from central Otago, New Zealand. J. Syst. Palaeontol. 5(1): 1–39. doi:10.1017/S1477201906001957 (HTML abstract)
