= Mount Karimui =

Highest point
- Coordinates: 6°34′07″S 144°46′30″E

Geography
- Country: Papua New Guinea
- State: Chimbu Province

Mount Karimui is an extinct volcano located in the southern region of the Central Ranges in Chimbu Province, Papua New Guinea. It has a blown out caldera, and a series of discrete peaks that rise out of the Karimui Plateau (which is at c.1100). The discrete peaks are tallest on the north end where they reach c.2550 meters.

== Ecology ==
Mount Karimui is covered in primary forest.

=== Wildlife ===
In July 2016 the first field observation of the Karimui owlet-nightjar occurred on the north-east ridge of the mountain.

=== Climate change ===
87 bird species found on the mountain have shifting their ranges up the mountain by an average of 370 feet due to warming in the area. The annual mean temperature of the area has increased by 0.7 degrees Fahrenheit in the past 50 years.
