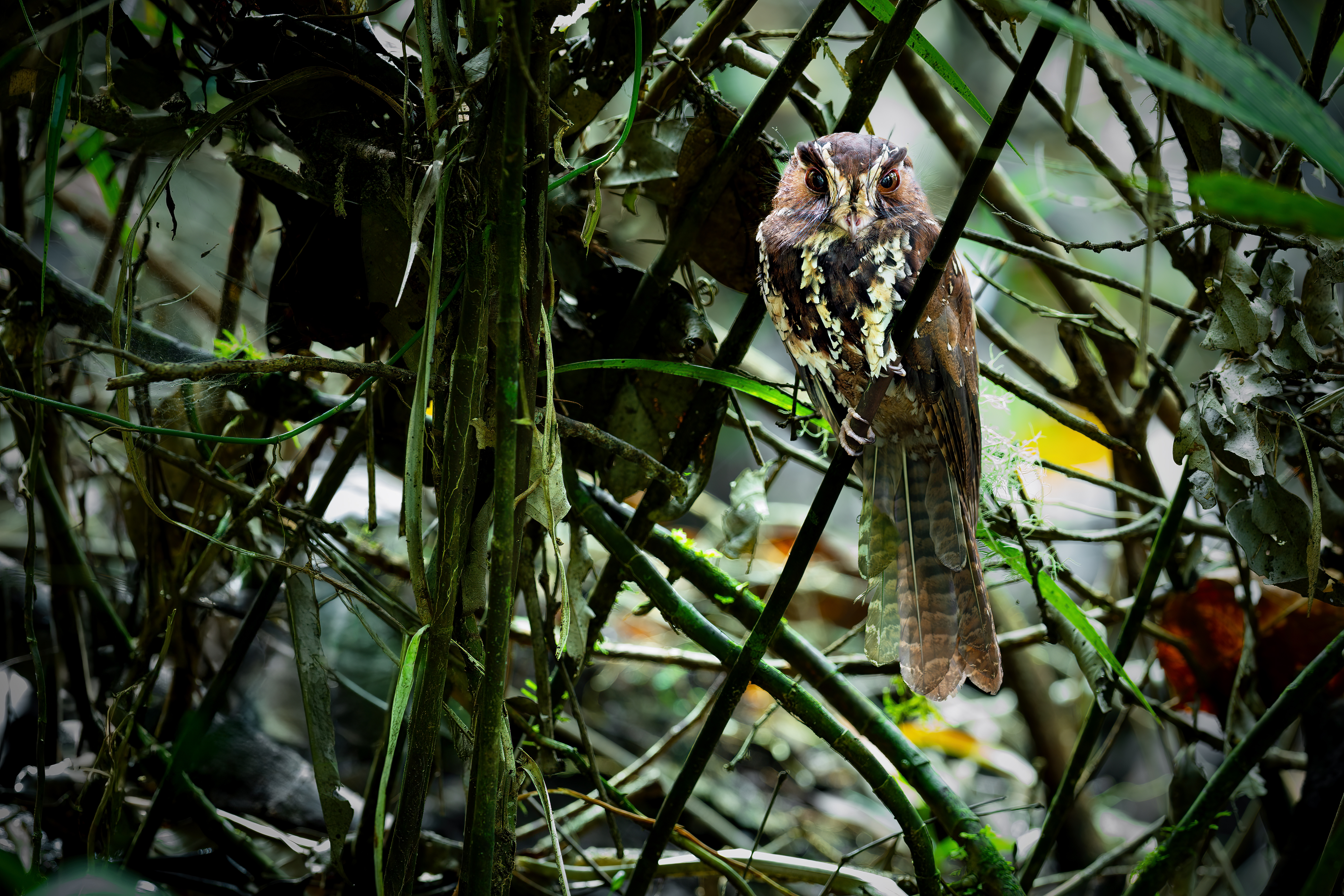

Conservation status
- Least Concern (IUCN 3.1)

Scientific classification
- Kingdom: Animalia
- Phylum: Chordata
- Class: Aves
- Order: Aegotheliformes
- Family: Aegothelidae
- Genus: Aegotheles
- Species: A. insignis

Binomial name
- Aegotheles insignis Salvadori, 1876

= Feline owlet-nightjar =

Species of bird

The feline owlet-nightjar (Aegotheles insignis) is a species of bird in the order Aegotheliformes and the family Aegothelidae. It is found in New Guinea. Its natural habitat is subtropical or tropical moist montane forests.

It is the largest owlet-nightjar in New Guinea. In general, it is a rufous bird whose underparts are streaked with three bands of white. It has a prominent white supercilium. Despite being the largest owlet-nightjar and being considered a fairly common bird, the feline owlet-nightjar is quite elusive and not often seen. The feline owlet-nightjar is closely related to the starry owlet-nightjar, although the two are considered as separate species. The primary food source for this species is insects, particularly beetles. The species is considered to be of least concern, according to the International Union for Conservation of Nature, although its biggest threat is deforestation.

== Taxonomy and systematics ==
The feline owlet-nightjar is a member of the Aegotheliformes order. The Latin name Aegotheles insignis was assigned in 1875 by Salvadori. The species was previously classified as being in the order Caprimulgiformes, along with the nightjars, frogmouths, potoos and the oilbird, but recent phylogeny suggests it may be more accurate to put the owlet-nightjars in their own separate order. Despite this, many books and papers still refer to the feline owlet-nightjar as being part of the order Caprimulgiformes. As such, the taxonomy of the feline owlet-nightjar is still under revision and may be updated in the future. The feline owlet-nightjar is in the family Aegothelidae and in the genus Aegotheles.

The feline owlet-nightjar is a monotypic taxon; therefore, it has no subspecies. However, Aegotheles insignis pulcher is a possible subspecies since these individuals from eastern New Guinea appear to be slightly larger than those from western New Guinea, but currently A. insignis pulcher is not listed as a separate subspecies of A. insignis. Historically, the feline owlet-nightjar was grouped into the genus Euaegotheles with the starry owlet-nightjar (Aegotheles tatei) and the Moluccan owlet-nightjar (Aegotheles crinifrons). It was then classified as the same species as its sister group the starry owlet-nightjar in the genus Euaegotheles (excluding Aegotheles crinifrons from this genus). This grouping was later revised, so that the two are elevated to species, primarily because of their morphological differences and the fact that these species would not interbreed. The two species are now classified as being closely related in the genus Aegotheles (along with the other owlet-nightjars), since it was found that the genera Euaegotheles and Aegotheles do not really differ.

Some of the alternative names of the feline owlet-nightjar are large owlet-nightjar, reddish owlet-nightjar, rufous owlet-frogmouth and rufous owlet-nightjar.

== Description ==
The feline owlet-nightjar is the largest owlet-nightjar in New Guinea, having a length of 28-30 cm. It has a weight of approximately 59-85 g. The male's wing ranges from 159-177 mm and the female's wing ranges from 168-178 mm. The male's tail ranges from 125-135 mm and the female's tail ranges from 129-145 mm. The tarsus ranges from 20-23.5 mm (based on male bird measurements) and the gape length ranges from 28.5-33 mm. The generation length of the species is 3.69 years on average.

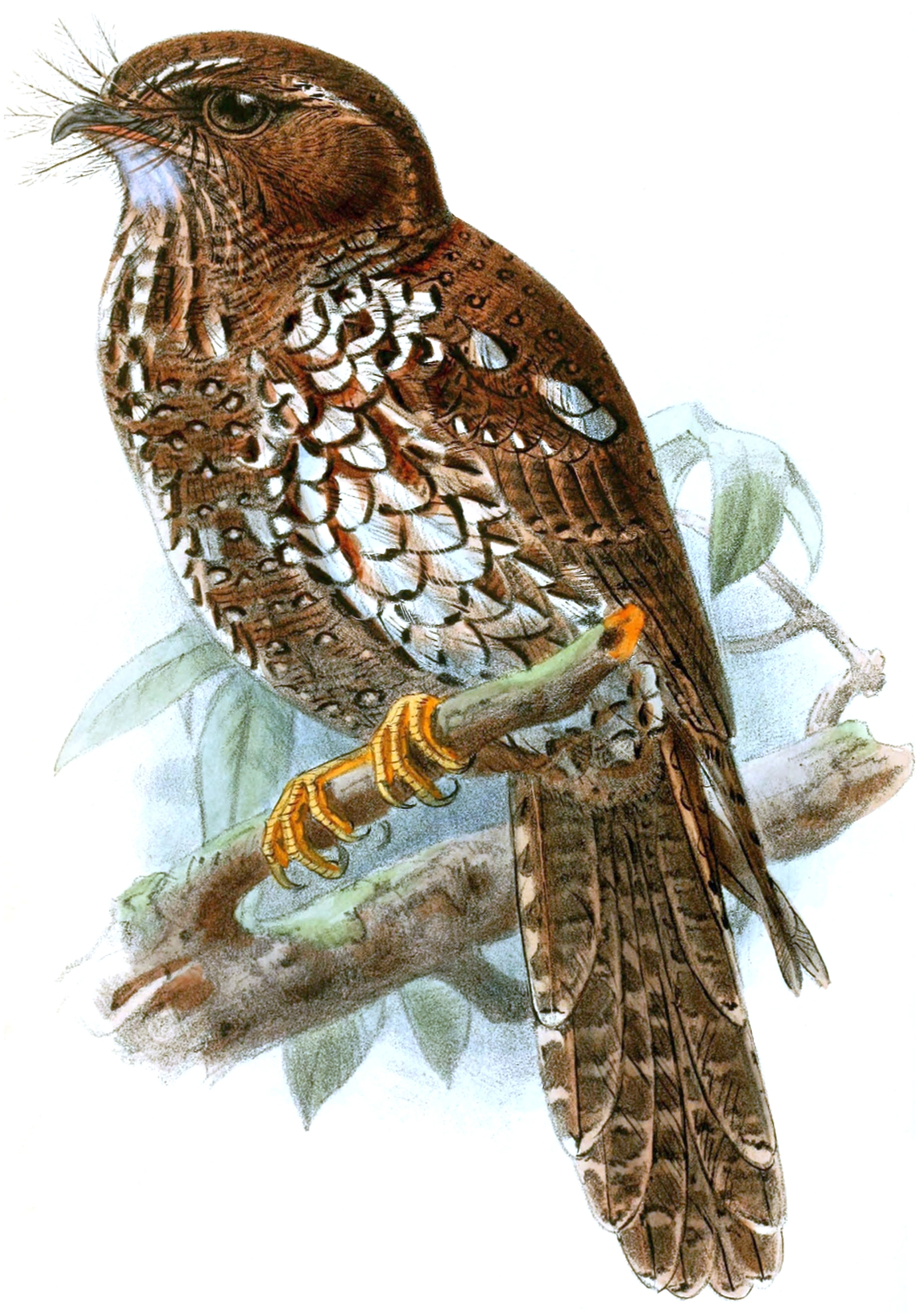
Drawing of a feline owlet-nightjar

There are two distinct morphs of the feline owlet-nightjar: the brown morph and the rufous morph, although intermediates exist as well. The brown morph of the feline owlet-nightjar is generally described as having a rufous or yellowish-beige back, rump and tail with dull chestnut-colored upperparts. It has small white or yellowish-beige spots with black edges on its upperparts. It may also have blackish-brown, rufous barring and spots on its wing coverts. Its head has small white accents: a white forehead (crown marks), a white supercilium (which extends past the eye) and a small patch of white just behind the eye. The underparts are streaked with three bands of white, two of which seem to form a disconnected V-shape and the other of which appears above the V-shape. The feline owlet-nightjar also has long, black semi-bristles on its face and ears, the latter of which are often tinged with purple. The rufous morph of the feline owlet-nightjar looks very similar to the brown morph, but it is more reddish and lacks the same spots and barring that the brown morph has.

The morphs have not been shown to be related to the birds' sex and there is reportedly weak sexual dimorphism in the species. Which morph the feline owlet-nightjar appears as may be related to age, although both show up in adult birds, so it is not clear whether this is the case. It has been suggested that the birds likely molt from light plumage to darker plumage. There have been very few sightings of nestlings or juveniles. One fledgling seen was described as being a rufous morph; another study supported this by stating that juveniles may be of the rufous morph, but with no black wavy lines (vermiculation). The juveniles have also been described as plainer than the adults. One study stated more conclusively that the remiges of the juvenile birds were rufous and non-vermiculated. These remiges were found to be retained in the first pre-basic molt of the juvenile bird.

Regardless of the morph and bird's sex, several other parts of the feline owlet-nightjar's body remain constant. The bill is small, a brownish colour and hooked. The lower mandible is white and the legs are yellowish-beige, almost flesh-coloured. Additionally, the irises of the bird are brown and the inside of the bird's mouth is pink (based on a male individual, but likely similar in female birds). Interestingly, it has been suggested that the irises of the bird may become darker based on age, similar to the changes in the bird's plumage.

The toes of owlet-nightjars are in the anisodactyl form and are synpelmous ("having the two major flexor tendons of the toes joined together"). The bird has ten primaries (as well as a vestigial eleventh primary).

The feline owlet-nightjar can be confused with its sister group, the starry owlet-nightjar, since they are similar in size. However, the two species differ in coloration and habitat. The starry owlet-nightjar also has fewer white markings on its underparts and above its eyes.

== Distribution and habitat ==
The feline owlet-nightjar lives in forests or forest edges in mountainous regions at 1100-2800 m, but sometimes as high as 3000 m. Individuals have also been seen in secondary forests or riparian forests in open terrain.

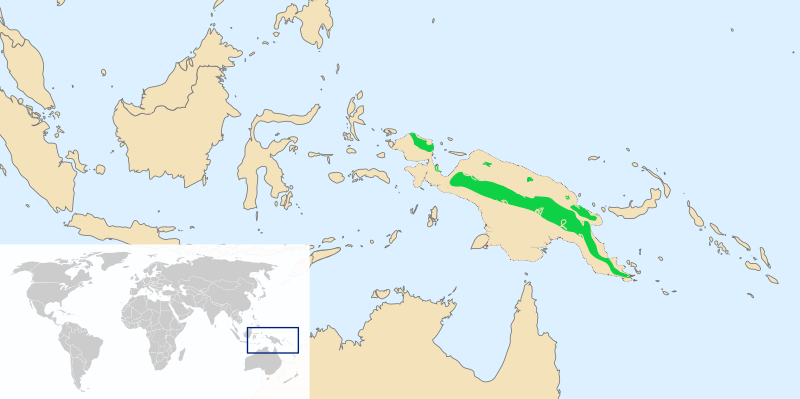
Distribution map of the feline owlet-nightjar

The species is endemic to New Guinea and ranges from Vogelkop E to the Huon Peninsula on the northeastern part of the country and to the Owen Stanley Range on the southeastern part of the country. Although it has not been thoroughly studied, the feline owlet-nightjar is assumed to be a year-round resident in its range. It is a very secretive bird, but it has been noted as fairly common, though not as common as other species in the genus Aegotheles.

== Behaviour and ecology ==
=== Vocalization ===
The vocalizations of the feline owlet-nightjar have not been fully described. One song is described as 4-5 ascending 'owrr' notes, which are somewhat trilled are the end, while another is described as "repeated squeaky 'kee' notes" of up to 11 which get faster as the bird calls. There has also been a report of a "foh…foh" call produced by the species.

=== Reproduction ===
Little is known about the specific breeding biology of the feline owlet-nightjar. It is likely that the nests are in tree hollows (similar to other species in the order). Breeding may take place in May-November, although this has not been sufficiently studied. Little is known about the eggs of this specific species. In general, owlet-nightjars can lay up to five eggs. The eggs are usually whitish with thick eggshells and may be either plain or slightly marked. According to one anecdote, a nest inside a hollow stump was found containing four eggs. The nest was composed of dried leaves, pieces of shredded bark and bird droppings (to hold the nest together).

The birds in the order Caprimulgiformes (a close relative of the order Aegotheliformes) appear to most often be monogamous. In general, Caprimulgiformes are usually single-brooded, but a new clutch can always be laid in case something happens to the first clutch. The eggs often hatch asynchronously, since the parent will incubate the first egg as soon as it is laid. Usually parental care in Caprimulgiformes appears to be shared by both parents.

The incubation period for owlet-nightjars is 25-27 days and the fledging period is 21 to 35 days. The chicks are covered in down feathers when they hatch. It is likely that owlet-nightjar chicks are covered in white protoptile feathers (the first natal down feathers), later replaced by darker mesoptile feathers (the second natal down feathers). The chicks are usually fed by regurgitation of food from the parents.

=== Diet and feeding ===
There is very little research about the diet and feeding behaviour of the feline owlet-nightjar. Some studies on stomach content suggest that the bird eats mainly insects. Specifically, feline owlet-nightjars seem to prioritize eating beetles. These insects are either hunted while the bird is in flight or are chased on the ground.

== Conservation status ==
The feline owlet-nightjar is listed as least concern by the International Union for Conservation of Nature. Despite this and the bird's fairly common occurrence in New Guinea, the population is currently suspected to be decreasing. This is because the feline owlet-nightjar is highly dependent on tree cover; therefore, one of the main threats to this species is deforestation. It is estimated that the forest habitat in the bird's range has declined by 1.9% during the last three generations, which could suggest why the population size of this species may have also declined by 1-19% within these same three generations. There are currently no conservation actions in place to protect this species, although some parts of the bird's range are listed as conservation sites.
