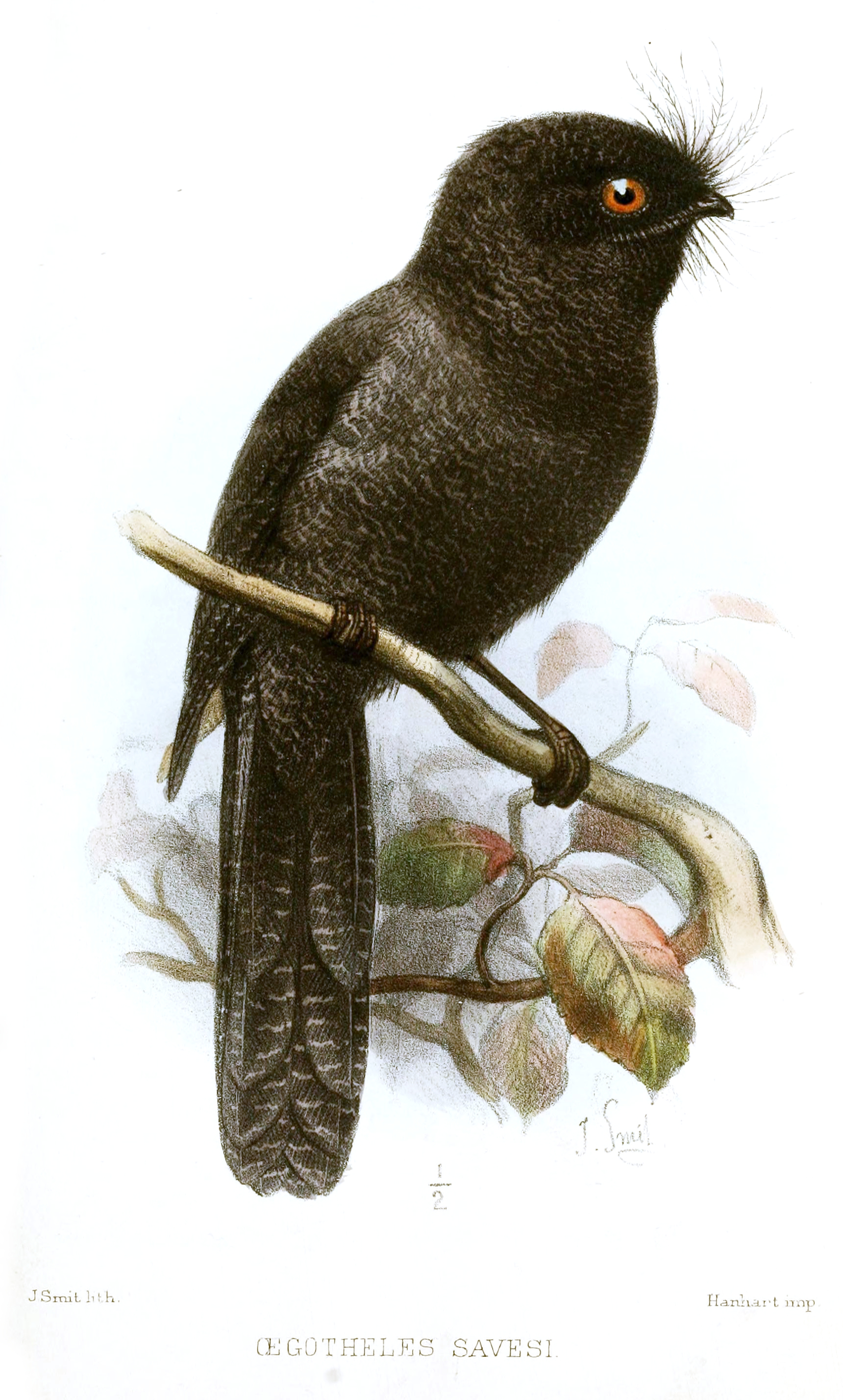
- Illustration by Joseph Smit, 1881

Conservation status
- Critically Endangered (IUCN 3.1)

Scientific classification
- Kingdom: Animalia
- Phylum: Chordata
- Class: Aves
- Order: Aegotheliformes
- Family: Aegothelidae
- Genus: Aegotheles
- Species: A. savesi

Binomial name
- Aegotheles savesi Layard, EL & Layard, ELC, 1881

= New Caledonian owlet-nightjar =

Species of bird

The New Caledonian owlet-nightjar (Aegotheles savesi), also known as the enigmatic owlet-nightjar, is a large owlet-nightjar with vermiculated grey-brown and black plumage. It has a long, slightly rounded tail, short, rounded wings, and long, stout legs. Its voice is unknown, but other owlet-nightjar species make churring and whistling sounds. It is the second-largest known owlet-nightjar (only the extinct New Zealand owlet-nightjar was larger), much larger than the Australian owlet-nightjar.

The New Caledonian owlet-nightjar is endemic to New Caledonia's Melaleuca savanna and humid forests. Other owlet-nightjars are solitary, nest in holes in trees, and forage from a perch, both flying out to catch flying insects (hawking) and descending onto prey on the ground or on trunks and branches. It is unknown if these habits apply to the New Caledonian owlet-nightjar, but this species is larger and has longer legs than the other species, so it may be more terrestrial. Although according to the last sighter of the bird, Jonathan Ekstrom it was observed to be hawking in the trees, the two features suggesting it likely still partakes in both the same behaviours to an extent. It is also similar however much larger than the Australian Owlet Nightjar.

The type specimen was collected after the bird flew into a bedroom in the village of Tonghoué. This large owlet-nightjar is only known from two specimens taken in 1880 and 1915, two other confirmed sightings and two other partly disputed sightings and one unconfirmed debated sighting. The most recent report is from a 1998 expedition which saw a large nightjar foraging for insects at dusk in Rivière Ni Valley. That report has been taken to suggest that the species may still survive in small numbers, but that total population is likely smaller than 50 individuals and declining.

The New Caledonian owlet-nightjar, often referred to as A. savesi has often been confused with A. cristatus. In 1966 A. savesi was classified under A. cristatus, which has been misleading due to their different features and color. (Olson 1987)

== History ==
The first known specimen was collected in the village of Tonghoué in the evening of the 11th of April 1880 after one flew into the bedroom of a resident. It was presented to M. Saves who in turn handed it over to Edgar Leopold Layard. Eventually the specimen was purchased by the Liverpool Museum in 1896. Another specimen was rediscovered in the early 21st Century in an Italian museum dating back to 1915

On the island of Maré, according to Jonathan Ekstrom, a confirmed sighting was reported in 1939 after one was shot (Macmillan 1938/39). This specimen has not been recovered nor did Macmillan mention what became of it. A potential sighting occurred in 1960 when one was shot near Païta, close to the original sighting. Daniel Letocart also claims to have found one in the early 1950s. Both sightings are unconfirmed.

A third potential sighting has been mentioned by Hannecart and Letocart (1983). Olson, Balouet and Fisher (1987) also mention the abundance of fossils, suggesting the bird was widespread throughout the archipelago, specifically on the islands Grand Terre and Maré. As info is scarce, it is possible it may have inhabited other islands according to fossil records.

After logging ceased in 1993, 7500 hectares of land was designated as 'Reserve Speciale de Faune et de Flore de la Ni-Kouakoue' in 1995. It receives little conservation work but is extremely remote and henceforth provides some conservation protection.

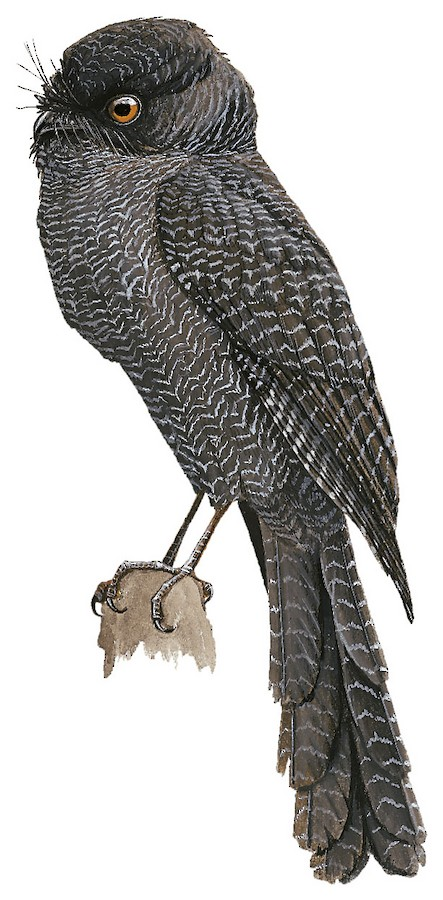
Illustration by Josep del Hoyo, 1992

In 1996, Daniel Letocart heard unusual calls comparable to that of an Australian Owlet-Nightjar (A.cristatus) in the forested headwaters of the Tchamba river on the east coast. Similar calls were reported by residents in 1996 and 1998. As the New Caledonian Owlet-Nightjar is taxonomically similar, this could suggest that this was the New Caledonian Owlet-Nightjar according to ornithologists. In 1998, Project Diadema spotted the bird in the River Ni Valley. At 18:40 on the 5th of November, while walking along a dirt road, Jonathan Ekstrom and Joe Tobias spotted a bird fly across the track where it began to hawk for approximately ten seconds before vanishing, "possibly to perch" before returning to hawk for an unspecified amount of time before disappearing without a trace. According to David James who was in the conversation between Jonathan Ekstrom and Tony Palliser (Part of Project Diadema), the sighting came under scrutiny in 1999, but due to no other archived emails and potential bias nor any proof, it is likely the sighting was re-confirmed.

Subsequent searches between 2002 and 2007 with more than 500 working days in the field and no credible reports from more than 120 interviews with locals have proved unsuccessful.
