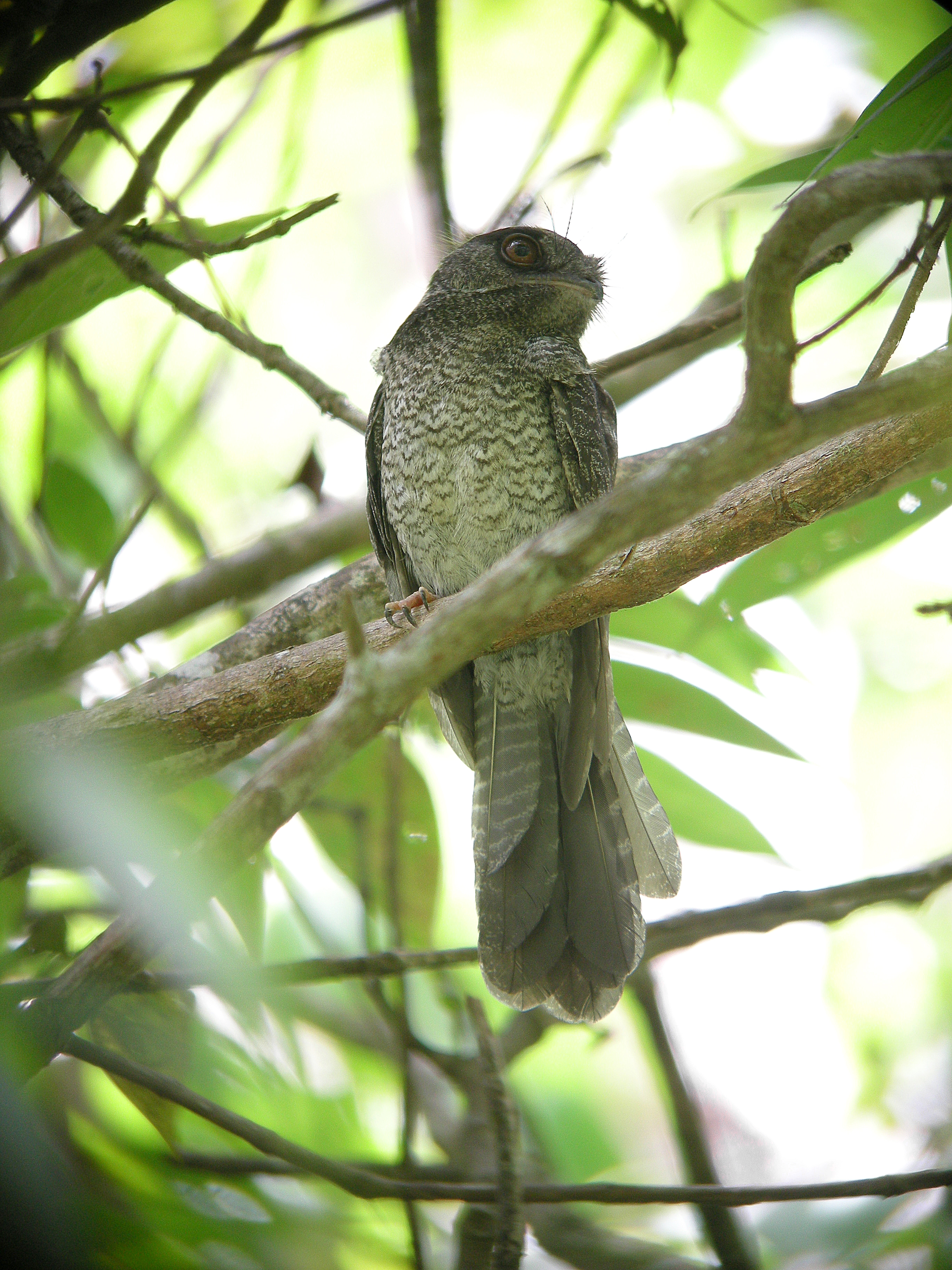

Conservation status
- Least Concern (IUCN 3.1)

Scientific classification
- Kingdom: Animalia
- Phylum: Chordata
- Class: Aves
- Order: Aegotheliformes
- Family: Aegothelidae
- Genus: Aegotheles
- Species: A. bennettii

Binomial name
- Aegotheles bennettii Salvadori & D'Albertis, 1875

= Barred owlet-nightjar =

Species of bird

The barred owlet-nightjar (Aegotheles bennettii) is a species of bird in the owlet-nightjar family Aegothelidae. It is found in New Guinea. The species was originally thought to be the same species as the Australian owlet-nightjar, until that species was found within the range of the barred owlet-nightjar. It was also considered to be the same species as the Vogelkop owlet-nightjar. There are three subspecies, the nominate, from south-eastern New Guinea, A. b. wiedenfeldi from northern New Guinea, and A. b. plumifer from the D'Entrecasteaux Islands.

The barred owlet-nightjar is 20 to 23 cm (7.9–9.1 in) and weighs 45–47 g (1.6–1.7 oz). The back is dark grey with buff vermiculations and pale undersides with dark barring. The face has broad buff eyebrows. The sexes are similar.

Its natural habitat is tropical moist lowland forests, or forest edge, up to 1,100 m (3,600 ft), or 800 m (2,600 ft) for the nominate race. A nest has been found in a dead trunk. The eggs are white, and the clutch size of the known nests is two eggs. The species is not thought to be threatened, as large areas of suitable habitat remain.
