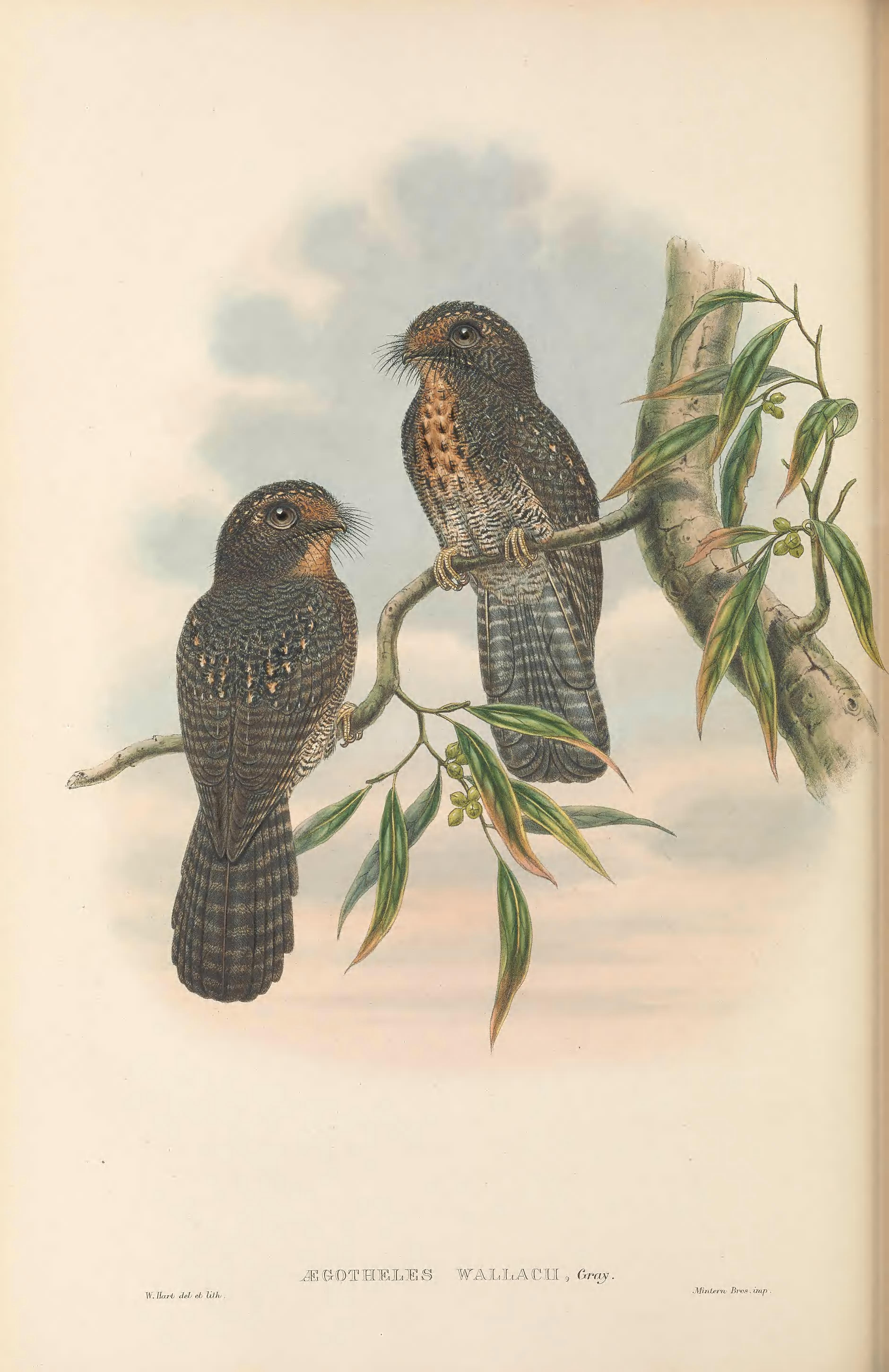

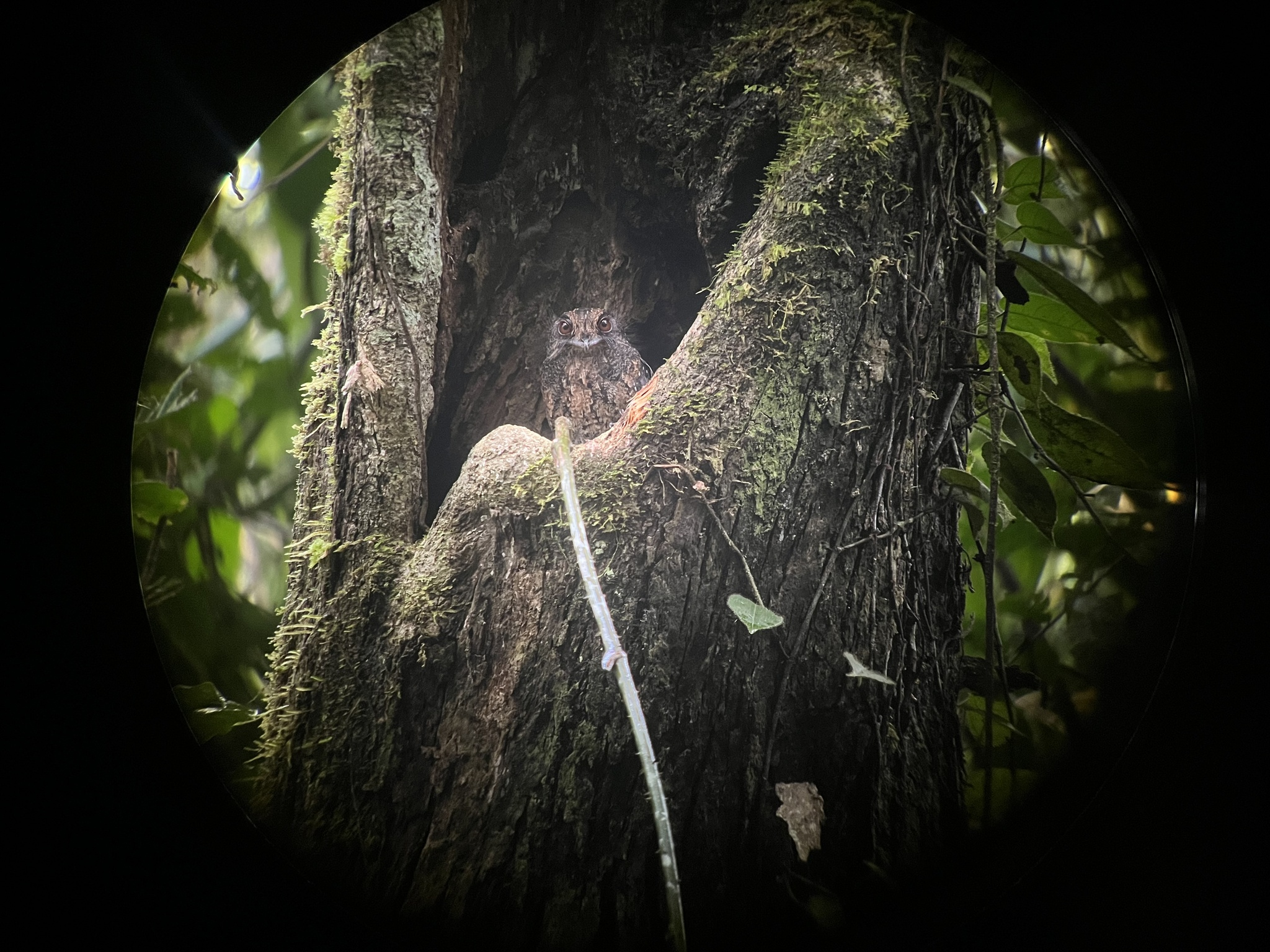

Conservation status
- Least Concern (IUCN 3.1)

Scientific classification
- Kingdom: Animalia
- Phylum: Chordata
- Class: Aves
- Clade: Strisores
- Order: Aegotheliformes
- Family: Aegothelidae
- Genus: Aegotheles
- Species: A. wallacii

Binomial name
- Aegotheles wallacii G.R. Gray, 1859

= Wallace's owlet-nightjar =

Species of bird

Wallace's owlet-nightjar (Aegotheles wallacii) is a species of bird in the family Aegothelidae. It is found in New Guinea.

It is named after Alfred Russel Wallace, a British naturalist, explorer, geographer, and biologist.
