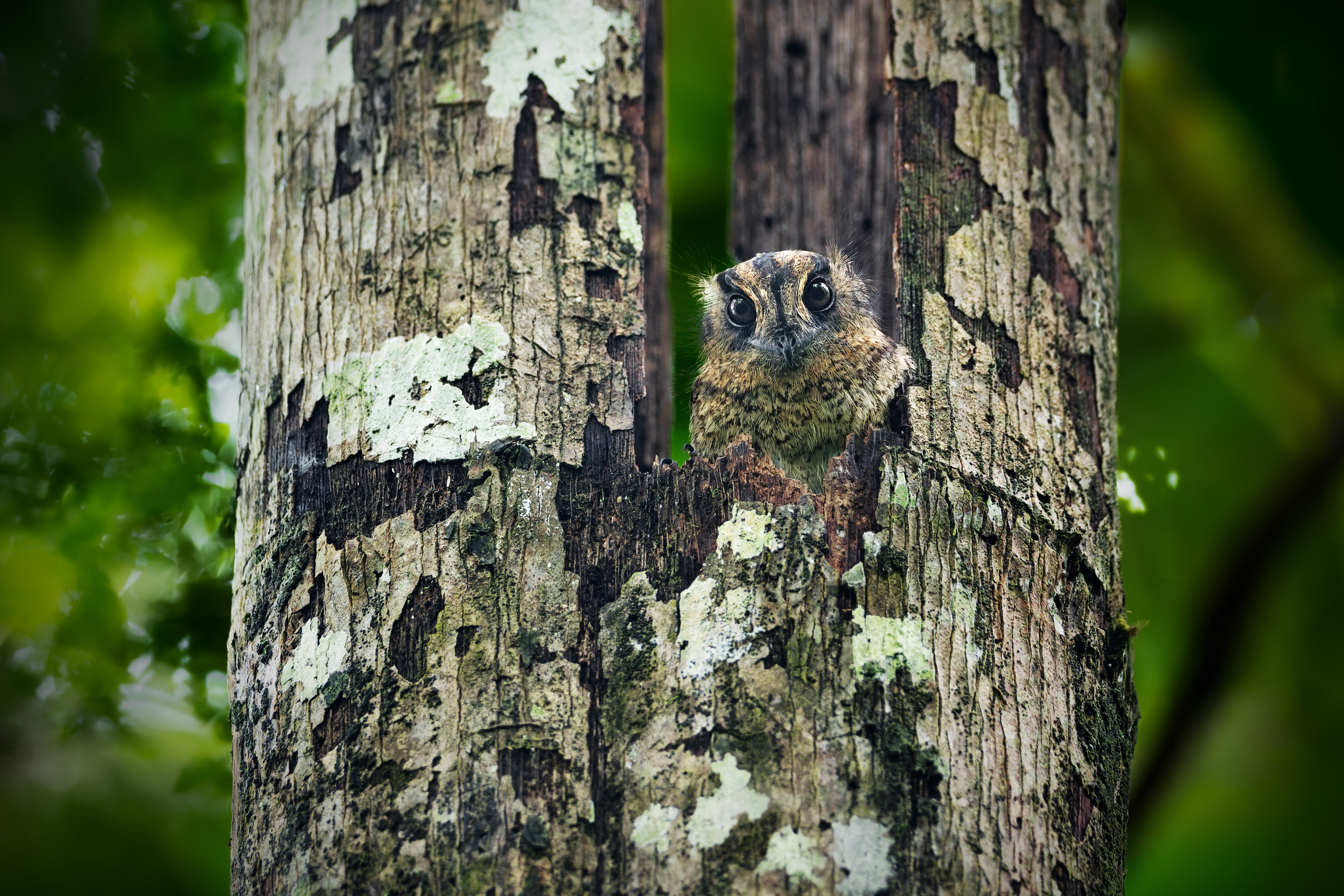

Conservation status
- Near Threatened (IUCN 3.1)

Scientific classification
- Kingdom: Animalia
- Phylum: Chordata
- Class: Aves
- Order: Aegotheliformes
- Family: Aegothelidae
- Genus: Aegotheles
- Species: A. affinis

Binomial name
- Aegotheles affinis Salvadori, 1876
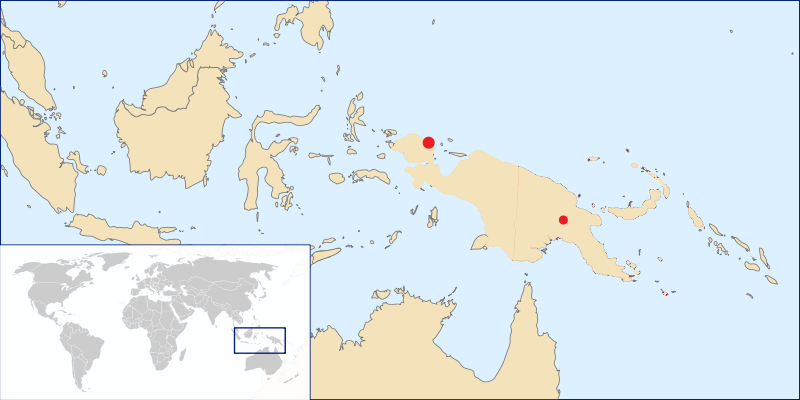

= Vogelkop owlet-nightjar =

Species of bird

The Vogelkop owlet-nightjar (Aegotheles affinis) or allied owlet-nightjar is a species of bird in the family Aegothelidae. It can be found in New Guinea. It is known from Bird's Head Peninsula and Eastern Highlands Province.
