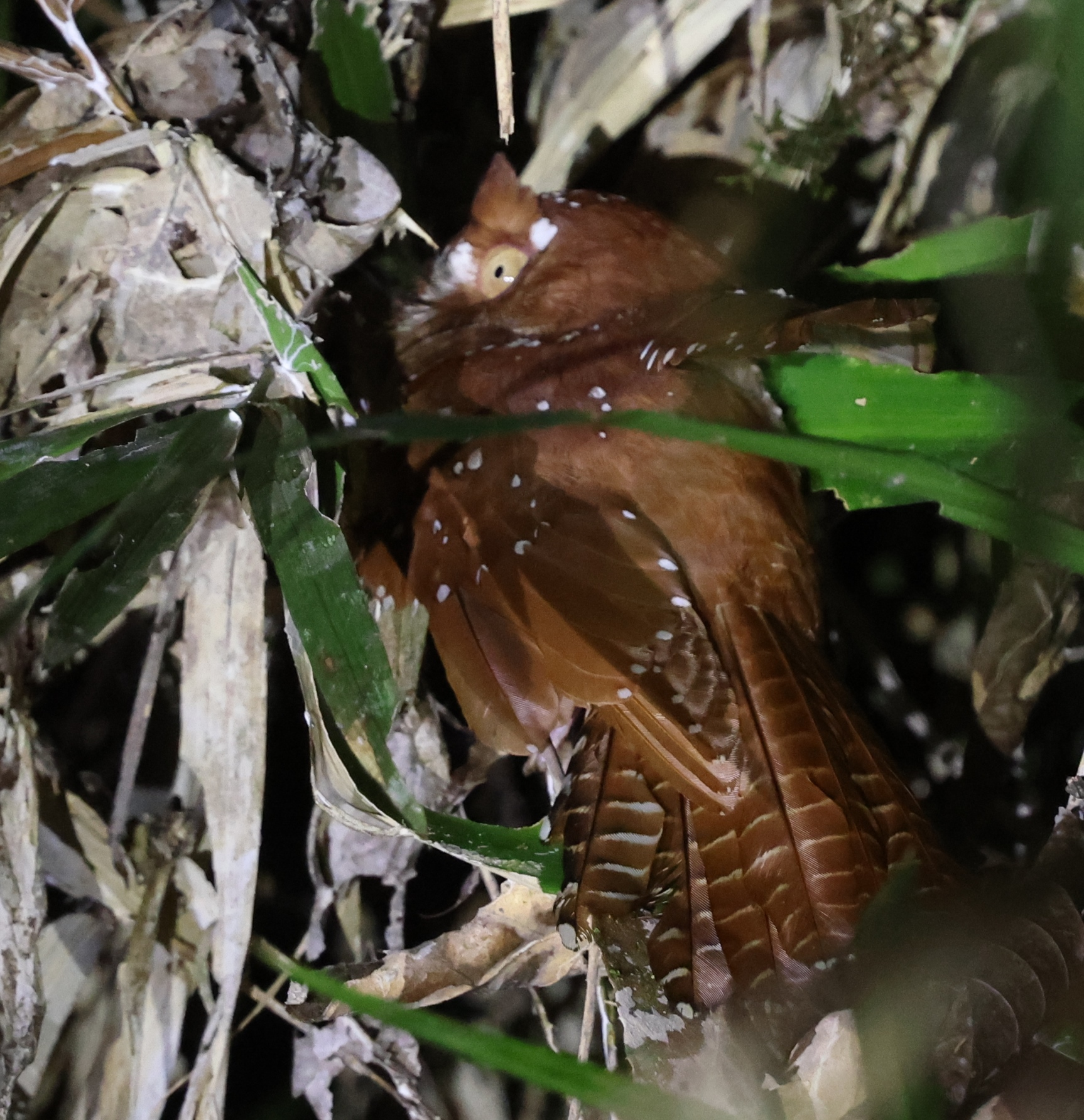

Conservation status
- Least Concern (IUCN 3.1)

Scientific classification
- Kingdom: Animalia
- Phylum: Chordata
- Class: Aves
- Order: Aegotheliformes
- Family: Aegothelidae
- Genus: Aegotheles
- Species: A. tatei

Binomial name
- Aegotheles tatei Rand, 1941
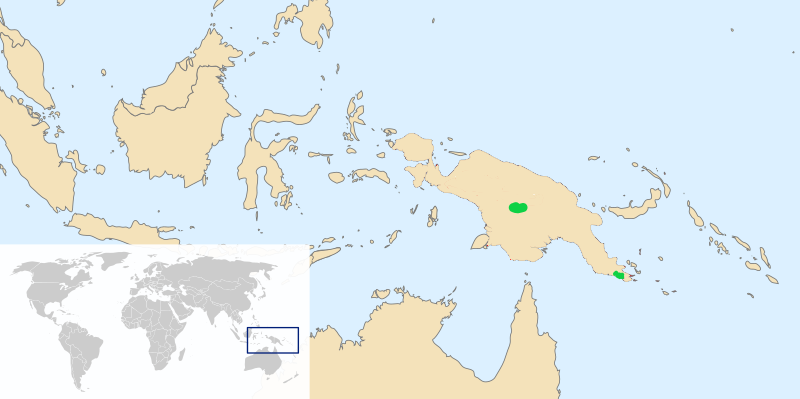

= Starry owlet-nightjar =

Species of bird

The starry owlet-nightjar (Aegotheles tatei), also known as the spangled owlet-nightjar, is a small to medium-sized, secretive nocturnal bird species found in the lowland forests of New Guinea. Like other owlet-nightjars in the family Aegothelidae, it has a distinctive appearance that falls between an owl and a nightjar. The species is very poorly known, recorded only from a few specimens and sightings. Due to its elusive nature, little is known about its life history, especially breeding behaviours and diet. Further study could reveal more about the species and inform future conservation and management efforts.

== Description ==
The starry owlet-nightjar is a nocturnal bird measuring about 25 to 30 cm in length. It has a slender build, a bright rufous (reddish-brown) plumage, and a short tail with white dorsal bars. The species is known for its upright perching posture, usually seen resting or roosting quietly in the midstory of tall lowland forests. Its large forward-facing eyes and facial disk give it an owl-like appearance, and they are protected by a fringe of short, whisker-like feathers. Its beak is short and wide, adapted for catching insects in flight, and its legs are short and feathered. Adults show three narrow white bands across the underparts, prominent white eyebrows, and small pale star-like spots on the back and shoulders which inspired its common name, "starry". The bird's feather "horns" curve slightly above the eyes and taper to a point, giving it a distinctive facial shape. In bright lighting, its plumage shows faint pale or frosted barring on the belly and breast. Juvenile birds have a plainer appearance, lacking the pale barring and "starry" spots found on adults. Their plumage is even more reddish-brown overall.

== Taxonomy ==
=== Systematic Placement ===
Traditionally, owlet-nightjars were classified within the order Caprimulgiformes. However, the DNA hybridization trees created by Sibley and Ahlquist revealed a deep branching between owlet-nightjars and other Caprimulgiformes. Later molecular and morphological analyses identified synapomorphies (shared, derived traits inherited from a common ancestor) linking the family Aegothelidae more closely with Apodiformes, the group that includes hummingbirds and swifts. This suggests a closer evolutionary relationship with these birds than with typical nightjars. Although owlet-nightjars have specialized nocturnal habits, both morphological and molecular data show that they are more closely related to swifts than to other nocturnal members of Caprimulgiformes, leading scientists to place them in the order Apodiformes.

=== Separation from Feline owlet-nightjar ===
The starry owlet-nightjar was previously considered a subspecies of the feline owlet-nightjar (Aegotheles insignis). However, phylogenetic evidence and morphological traits supported its recognition as a separate species.

Researchers discovered that the starry owlet-nightjar differed from the feline owlet-nightjar in several noticeable ways, including its smaller overall size, having at least seven differences in feather patterns, the shortest legs of any owlet-nightjar, stiffer feathers on the throat and around the ears, and lacking the long, curved feather tips on the face that other owlet-nightjars have. In 2008, Frank Lambert recorded the first territorial and alarm call of the starry owlet-nightjar. Its vocalizations were unlike that of the Feline owlet-nightjar and all other owlet-nightjar species.

Another important difference is that the two species were seen occupying completely different habitats. The starry owlet-nightjar inhabits extreme lowland rainforest (below 100 m elevation), whereas the feline owlet-nightjar is found in mountainous forests from about 1140 m to 2800 m in elevation.

=== Challenges ===
Understanding the classification of the genus Aegotheles is difficult because individual birds of the same species can look quite different in colour and feather patterns. There are also very few specimens in collections coming from a limited number of locations, making it challenging to see the full range of variation and group birds into clear species or subspecies. Due to these limitations, the family Aegothelidae has never had a major study of its evolutionary relationships, and further genetic studies are needed to better understand how the species are all related.

== Habitat and Distribution ==
The starry owlet-nightjar belongs to the family Aegothelidae, a small group of nocturnal birds currently restricted to the Australasian region. Seven of the ten extant species occur on the continental island of New Guinea. The starry owlet-nightjar is endemic to the island, meaning it occurs nowhere else in the world. So far, it has been recorded in the upper reaches of the Fly River near Kiunga and the southern peninsula inland of Amazon Bay in Papua New Guinea.

The species is solitary and little is known about its habits, but it is thought to spend most of its time in the upper midstory and canopy of tall moist forests near rivers. Like other members of the family Aegothelidae, it nests in tree cavities and holes. Despite being rarely observed, it has been recorded in lowland rainforests, including areas along the Kali Muyu River and even in forests that have been logged.

== Behaviour ==
During the day, it rests quietly on perches a few meters above the ground in the midstory or canopy of tall rainforest, often remaining motionless and difficult to observe. The species is typically solitary, with individuals rarely seen together. Like other owlet-nightjars, it can enter a state of torpor (a temporary period of reduced body temperature and metabolism) when food is scarce or temperatures drop.

=== Vocalizations ===
The starry owlet-nightjar has a call similar to the feline owlet-nightjar but is slightly higher in pitch. Its main song is a rough, three to four note series, often described as "gew! gok-gak!" with the first notes lower and the last two close together in tone. Its song consists of four short "whor" notes in sequence. It also involves a sharp, medium-pitched "peh!" call, which can be heard after singing or in response to playback. The species calls are peculiar and can be mimicked easily.

Diet

The starry owlet-nightjar is nocturnal, active primarily at night when it hunts for insects. Its slender body shape and feathers suggests that it may capture prey in ways slightly different from other owlet-nightjars, possibly flying out from perches to catch insects midair rather than pouncing from a branch.

Reproduction

Although the reproduction process of the starry owlet-nightjar and other species remains almost entirely unknown, information from the Australian owlet-nightjar suggests how this species may reproduce. The Australian species nests in tree hollows or other natural cavities, often lining the cavity with leaves.Typically, the clutch consists of three to four glossy white eggs, though clutches of five have been reported. Incubation is carried out mainly by the female and lasts about 25 to 27 days. Both parents feed the chicks once they hatch and the young grow quickly and leave the nest and fly on their own about three to four weeks later. Juveniles may stay close to their parents for several months after leaving the nest. The starry-owlet nightjar may have a similar breeding process, given the same family and genus, but more research is needed for exact details.

== Conservation Status ==
The starry owlet-nightjar is currently listed as Least Concern by the IUCN as of 2023, although from 2000-2017 it was considered Data Deficient due to limited information on its population and distribution. Its population trend is expected to be slowly declining, but the species does not meet the thresholds for a higher threat category. The population size is unknown but its not thought to be small enough to qualify as Vulnerable. The starry owlet-nightjar inhabits lowland rainforest in New Guinea, most of which remains undisturbed, although some logging and habitat clearing is occurring at a slow rate. However, habitat loss and ecosystem degradation may eventually threaten the species if logging efforts continue, as the starry owlet-nightjar is highly dependent on forests. Overall, the species is considered to be at low risk, but continued monitoring of its habitat and population is recommended.
