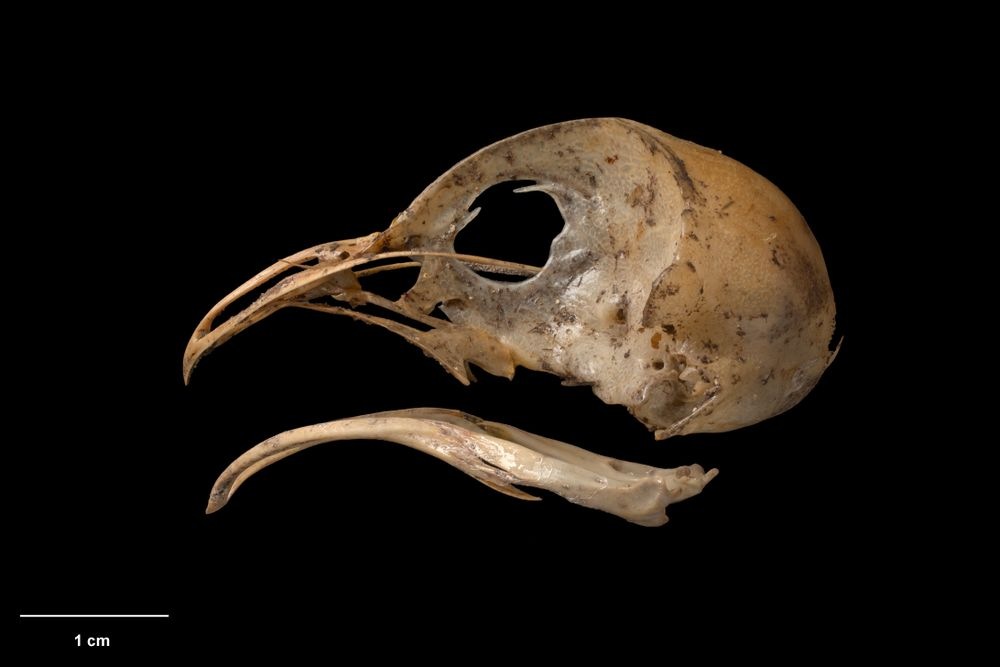

Conservation status
- Extinct (1400s)

Scientific classification
- Kingdom: Animalia
- Phylum: Chordata
- Class: Aves
- Order: Aegotheliformes
- Family: Aegothelidae
- Genus: Aegotheles
- Species: †A. novazealandiae

Binomial name
- †Aegotheles novazealandiae (Scarlett 1968)

Synonyms
- Megaegotheles novazealandiae

= New Zealand owlet-nightjar =

New Zealand owlet-nightjar Temporal range: Quaternary

Extinct species of bird

The New Zealand owlet-nightjar (Aegotheles novaezealandiae), is an extinct bird species that was formerly endemic to New Zealand. It is recognized as the largest known species within the family Aegothelidae (owlet-nightjars). In Māori, the indigenous language of New Zealand, it is called Ruru hinapō. This species is characterized by its enlarged body size, reduced wings, and strong legs. It is believed to have been either flightless or had very minimal flight ability. The New Zealand owlet-nightjar went extinct in the late 13th century, prior to significant human settlement in New Zealand. Consequently, little is known about its plumage, breeding habits, or behavior; most available information regarding its morphology and behavior is derived from remnants, bones, and DNA analysis.

== Taxonomy ==
The New Zealand owlet-nightjar (Aegotheles novaezealandiae) belongs to the order Aegotheliformes within the monotypic family Aegothelidae, commonly known as owlet-nightjars. This family contains a single genus, Aegotheles. The exact number of species in this genus is debated, with many sources indicating twelve species. Currently, Aegotheles species are found across Australia and New Guinea, with Aegotheles novaezealandiae being the only owlet-nightjar native to New Zealand. This species was first discovered in the 19th century in New Zealand's Holocene fissures and caves.

The New Zealand owlet-nightjar was initially classified under the genus Megaegotheles due to distinct morphological traits, but was later reassigned to the genus Aegotheles. Researchers noted that its enlarged body size and unique wing and leg proportions set it apart from other Aegotheles species. However, as more molecular and genetic data became available, it was determined that the morphological differences were not sufficient to warrant a separate classification.

In general, the lineage of owlet-nightjars (Aegotheles) has proven challenging to define, primarily due to interspecific variations in plumage color and pattern. Additionally, the elusive and nocturnal nature of these birds makes them difficult to observe and study. As a result, most characteristics used for classification of these species are linked to genetic data rather than solely their morphology.

Owlet-nightjars should not be confused with nightjars, which belong to the family Caprimulgidae. A 2003 analysis of DNA sequences confirmed that owlet-nightjars constitute a distinct family, Aegothelidae. It is now understood that owlet-nightjars are more closely related to swifts and hummingbirds than to nightjars.

== Description ==
The New Zealand owlet-nightjar is an extinct bird species that became extinct in the late 13th century. In Māori, it is referred to as Ruru hinapō. This species is recognized as the largest owlet-nightjar in recorded history. They ranged in weight between 150-200g. Estimates of their weight are based on allometric measurements of their bones.

The New Zealand owlet-nightjar was a nocturnal bird that inhabited a range of environments across New Zealand, including dense forests, caves, and shrublands. Since this species went extinct before the widespread development of human civilization in New Zealand, no physical traits have been recorded; inferences about their appearance are derived almost exclusively from bone remains and DNA analysis.

Owlet-nightjars (genus Aegotheles) are typically small to medium-sized birds characterized by broad, weak bills and an upright posture. Their weak bills are adapted for catching insects. They possess a facial disc with forward-facing eyes, which helps in sound localization and enhances hearing ability. Owlet-nightjars also do not reflect light from their eyes in the dark, which is a feature that distinguishes them from nightjars. These morphological traits found in the Aegotheles genus are consistent with those found in New Zealand owlet-nightjar remains. The wings of New Zealand owlet-nightjars were somewhat larger in size to those of other Aegotheles species, but they had very notably enlarged hind limbs. This suggests that they were either very weak fliers or lacked the ability to fly altogether. Their strong legs likely enabled them to navigate steep elevations, such as trees or rocky surfaces, compensating for their limited flight ability.

=== Plumage ===
Owlet-nightjars (genus Aegotheles) typically possess plumage that allows them to camouflage within their surroundings, contributing to their difficulty in being observed. Although it cannot be said for certain that the New Zealand owlet-nightjar had coloration that provided effective camouflage, it is likely they did based on their lineage to closely related species within the genus that do exhibit cryptic coloration. These colors may include various shades of brown and gray. The plumage of juvenile owlet-nightjars varies among species; some exhibit a darker brown appearance, while others have a paler coloration with white feathers in certain areas. Due to this variation and the general lack of knowledge regarding juvenile owlet-nightjars, little can be said about the plumage of Aegotheles novaezealandiae juveniles. Generally, owlet-nightjars do not display strong sexual dimorphism, with males and females showing no significant differences in size or coloration.

=== Bones ===
Remains of the New Zealand owlet-nightjar have been recovered in various locations across New Zealand's islands. In a study conducted by R.J. Scarlett in 1968, the following observations and measurements of Aegotheles novaezealandiae bones were recorded. These measurements indicate they are the largest known member of the genus Aegotheles. These measurements do not account for all individuals of Aegotheles novaezealandiae but provide informative estimates of their general sizes:

- Cranium: Larger than that of other Aegotheles species, with a rounded posterior. The orbital walls conceal the entire orbital space. Width at post-orbitals: 2.8 cm; height: 1.7+ cm; occipital to flexure: 2.45+ cm; width between orbits: 1.9 cm.
- Pelvis: Larger than that of other Aegotheles species, characterized by a prominent central ridge forming a crest. Length: 2.6–2.75 cm; sacral length: 1.525–2.1 cm; anterior width: 1.0 cm; posterior width: 2.0 cm; width across supra-trochanteric processes: 1.8 cm.
- Sternum: Larger than that of other Aegotheles species, with the following dimensions: length: 2.15–2.4 cm; length along keel: 1.7–1.975 cm; anterior width: 1.9–2.1 cm; posterior width: 2.1–2.2 cm; height of anterior process to keel: 1.25 cm; width of “waist”: 1.45–1.6 cm.
- Femur: Larger than that of other Aegotheles species, displaying a relatively straight and flattened appearance with a tubercle on the outer edge (ventral surface). Length: 2.325–3.2 cm; proximal width: 0.475–0.65 cm; mean measurement: 0.2–0.275 cm; distal measurement: 0.475–0.625 cm.
- Tibiotarsus: Approximately twice the size of that in other Aegotheles species. Length: 5.35–6.7 cm; proximal width: 0.33–0.6 cm; mean measurement: 0.2–0.3 cm; distal measurement: 0.425–0.6 cm.
- Tarsometatarsus: Approximately twice the size compared to other Aegotheles species. Length: 3.7–4.925 cm; proximal width: 0.375–0.6 cm; mean measurement: 0.175–0.25 cm; distal measurement: 0.4–0.625 cm.
- Humerus: Significantly larger than in other Aegotheles species. The enlarged size is the humerus's only distinguishable feature from other Aegotheles species. Length: 2.9–3.5 cm; proximal width: 0.825–0.95 cm; mean measurement: 0.25–0.3 cm; distal measurement: 0.6–0.7 cm.
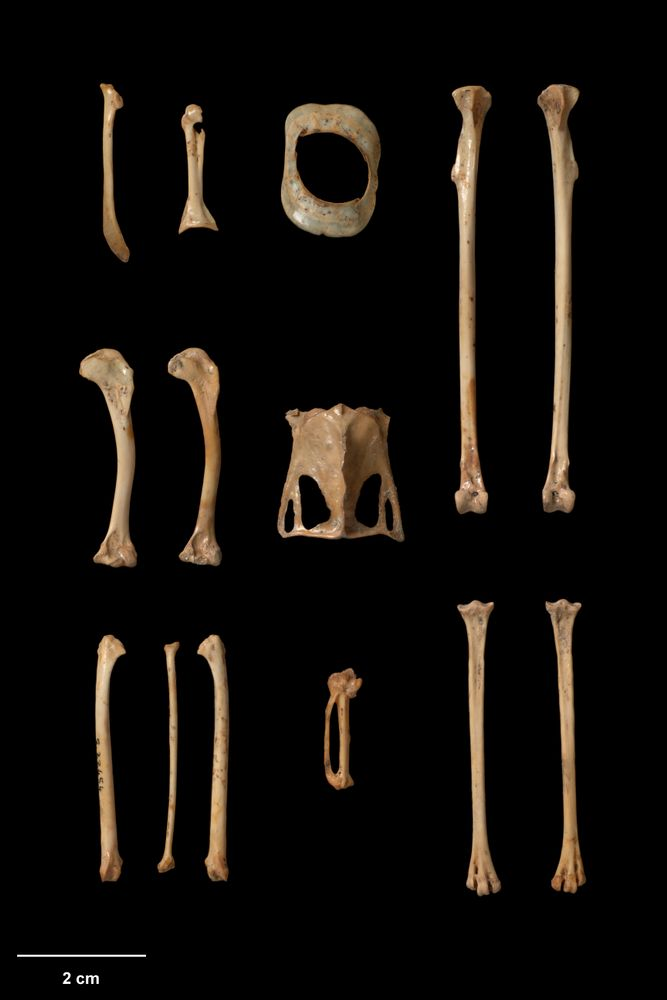
Variety of recovered A. novaezealandiae bones

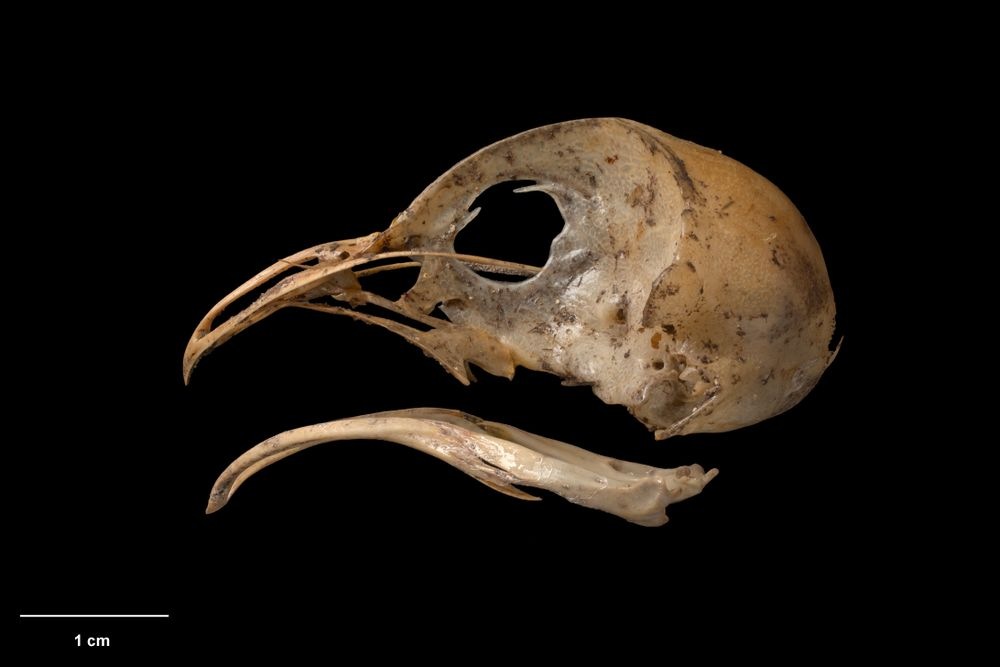
Lateral view of an A. novaezealandiae skull

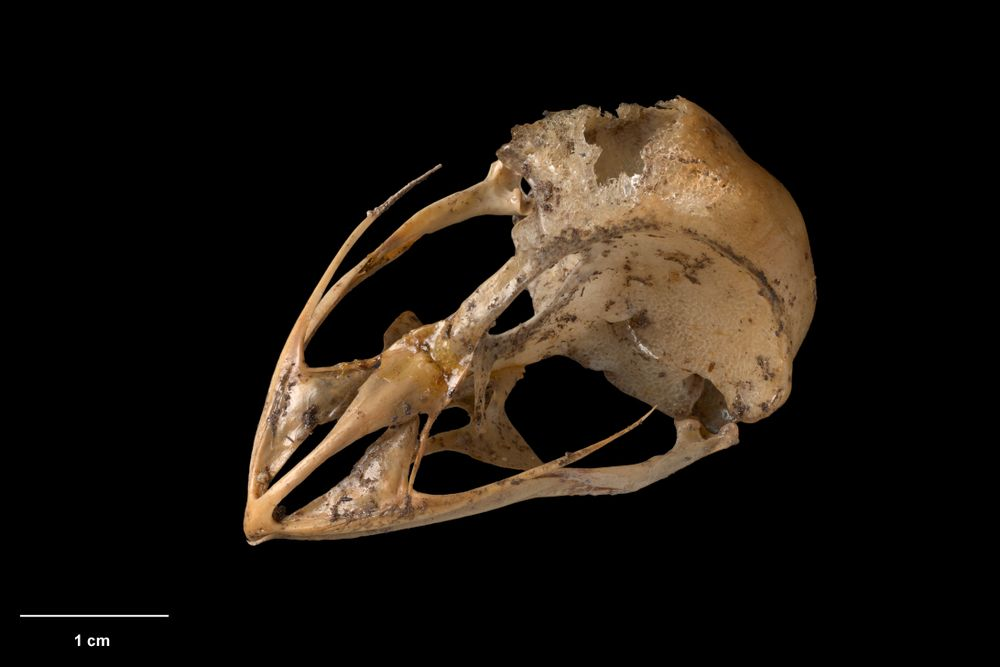
Dorsal view of an A. novaezealandiae skull

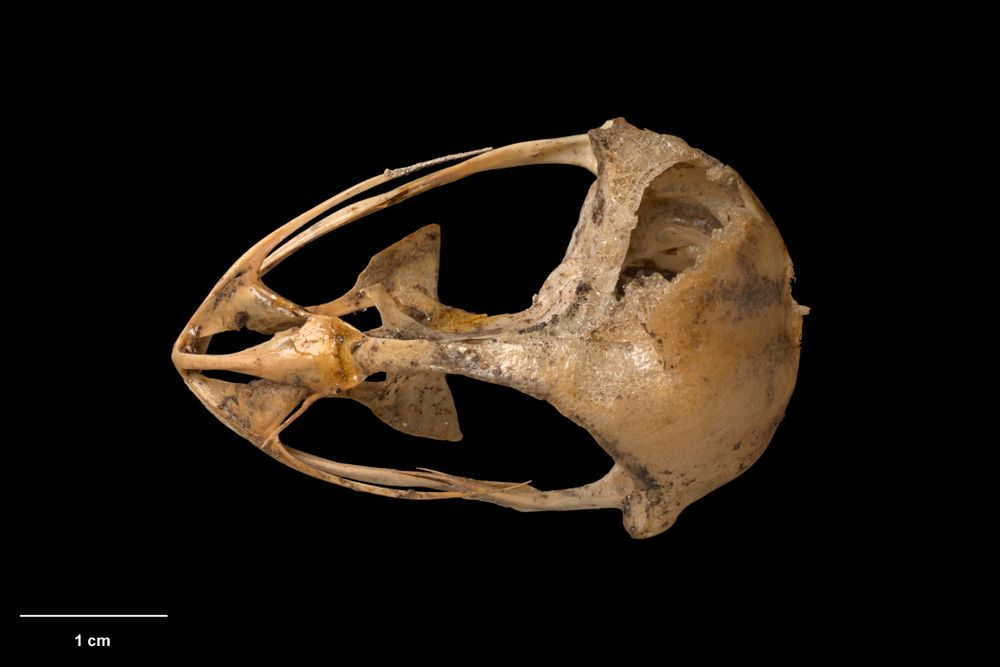
Dorsal view of an A. novaezealandiae skull

== Behaviour & Ecology ==
New Zealand owlet-nightjars were a nocturnal bird species, known to prefer staying hidden. They nested in caves, fissures and holes in the ground. Their main ecological roles would’ve included insect control, seed dispersal and prey for larger predators. Their main predators included laughing owls (Sceloglaux albifacie), and Pacific rats (Rattus exulans). Owlet-nightjars are not considered very social species, and often live alone or in pairs. Much of their existence is not well studied, so little information on their behaviour and ecology is known.

=== Diet ===
Based on various sources examining owlet-nightjar diets, Aegotheles species have been known to consume a variety of prey including spiders, ants, beetles, flies, cockroaches and grasshoppers. While there lacks feasible data on the diet of the New Zealand owlet-nightjar, insights can be drawn from the feeding habits of other owlet-nightjars. It is likely that the New Zealand owlet-nightjar spent most of its time on the ground, foraging for insects and other food sources on the forest floor. Hunting occurred during the night.

=== Nesting ===
There is no sufficient data on breeding habits of Aegotheles novaezealandiae. Based on the locations of their remains, it is evident that they likely nested in caves. They appeared to have nested at cave entrances, with indications showing they ventured deeper into caves than the majority of other species. Evidence of these nesting sites came from juvenile and adult remnants of New Zealand owlet-nightjars found at the bases of various cave entrances.

=== Predators ===
One of the New Zealand owlet-nightjar's most notable predators was the laughing owl, or Sceloglaux albifacie. The presence of this predatory bird facilitated the discovery of New Zealand owlet-nightjar remains, as many were found in areas inhabited by the laughing owl. Another major predator for New Zealand owlet-nightjars was an invasive rat species called the Pacific rat (Rattus exulans). When the Pacific rat was introduced, this became their biggest threat, and was ultimately the species that lead to their extinction.

== Distribution ==
Map of New Zealand

The New Zealand owlet-nightjar was distributed throughout most of New Zealand, including both the North Island and South Island. They are endemic to New Zealand and are the only known species of owlet-nightjar to have inhabited the country. They occupied a diverse range of habitats including caves, dense, wet forests as well as dry shrublands. Many of their remains, both adult and juvenile, have been discovered in caves, some much deeper than most other species, although usually at the base of cave entrances. For this reason, it is believed they likely nested in caves. Their strong legs further support this theory as they would’ve been able to climb steep rock walls of caves, despite being poor fliers. In general, almost all owlet-nightjar species (genus Aegotheles) are known to inhabit cavities and holes.

== Extinction ==
Numerous sites across New Zealand have yielded remnants of the New Zealand owlet-nightjar. These locations extend from the North Island to the South Island, with at least 91 confirmed sites from the Holocene age and an additional four sites from the Pleistocene age. Analysis of these remains suggests that Aegotheles novaezealandiae likely went extinct in the late 13th century.

Discussions surrounding the cause of their extinction appear fairly unanimous. Data indicate the New Zealand owlet-nightjar was driven to extinction by the invasive Pacific rat (Rattus exulans), which is believed to have arrived in New Zealand with Polynesian settlers. The extinction of this species occurred well before widespread human settlement, indicating that hunting and habitat loss were unlikely causes of their decline. By the time Polynesian settlements were established, there is no evidence of the survival of the New Zealand owlet-nightjar. They are unlikely to have been hunted due to their small size and nocturnal habits. Additionally, during the period of their extinction, there exhibited no major environmental changes in New Zealand that would have impacted the survival of this species. Disease can also be excluded as a possibility for their extinction as there is no indication of illnesses that would’ve affected the species at the time. Thus, it is evident the New Zealand owlet-nightjar was pushed to extinction primarily due to predation by the Pacific rat.

== Status ==
Conservation status: extinct.
