= List of sunbirds =

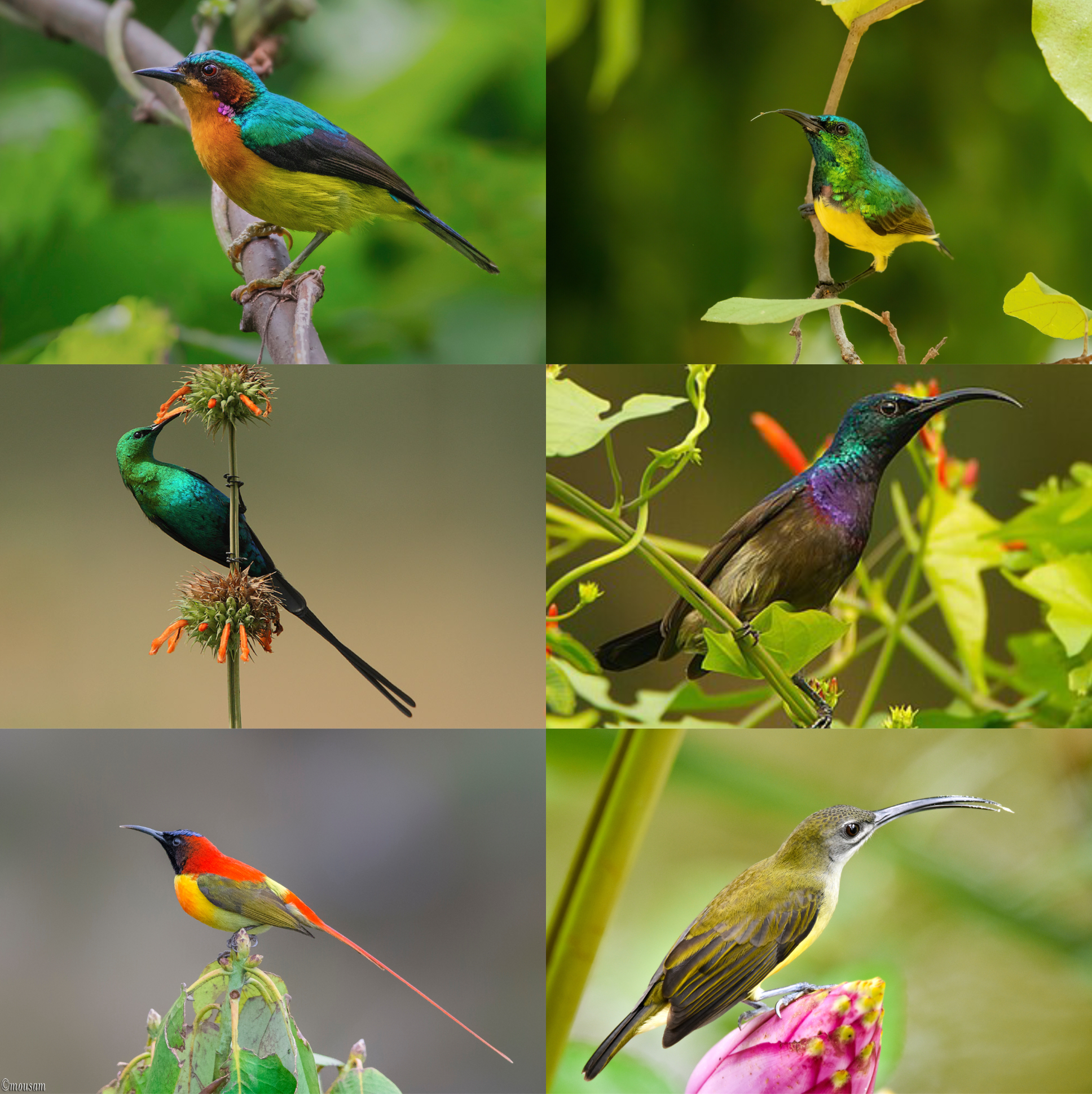
Clockwise from top left: ruby-cheeked sunbird, collared sunbird, Loten's sunbird, little spiderhunter, fire-tailed sunbird, and malachite sunbird

Nectariniidae is a family of passerine birds in the superfamily Passeroidea, comprising the sunbirds and spiderhunters. Members of Nectariniidae are also known as nectariniids. Their range extends from the Afrotropics north to the Levant and southern Arabian Peninsula, and east through South and Southeast Asia up to New Guinea and northern Australia. They inhabit a wide variety of habitats, from arid savannah to tropical rainforests, and can be found from sea level to an altitude of 4,900 m (16,100 ft). Sunbirds are generally small birds with long, thin, down-curved bills and brightly coloured, iridescent plumages. They display marked sexual dimorphism, and males are much more visually striking than females, who are usually dull green, brown, or grey. The spiderhunters (Arachnothera) are larger than other sunbirds and show less sexual dimorphism.

The primary threat facing sunbirds is habitat loss and degradation caused by deforestation due to agriculture. Most species of sunbird are considered to be of Least Concern by the IUCN, although three species, the Amani sunbird, Loveridge's sunbird, and the elegant sunbird, are Endangered, and several others are considered Near Threatened or Vulnerable.

The exact delineation of sunbird species is somewhat contested and varies from authority to authority: the International Ornithologists' Union (IOU) recognizes 146 species of sunbirds in 16 genera, while other authorities recognise 143–147 species. The largest genera are Cinnyris and Aethopyga, with 53 and 23 species, respectively. Recent phylogenetic studies indicate that several widespread species such as the olive-backed and black sunbirds may represent complexes of multiple cryptic species. Several undescribed species of sunbird may also exist in Sierra Leone, Djibouti, and Tanzania.

== Conventions ==
IUCN Red List categories
Conservation status
- EX: Extinct (0 species)
- EW: Extinct in the wild (0 species)
- CR: Critically endangered (0 species)
- EN: Endangered (3 species)
- VU: Vulnerable (4 species)
- NT: Near threatened (7 species)
- LC: Least concern (116 species)

Other categories
- DD: Data deficient (0 species)
- NE: Not evaluated (16 species)

Conservation status codes listed follow the International Union for Conservation of Nature (IUCN) Red List of Threatened Species. Range maps are provided wherever possible; if a range map is not available, a description of the sunbird's range is provided. Ranges are based on the IOC World Bird List for that species unless otherwise noted. Population estimates are of the number of mature individuals and are taken from the IUCN Red List.

This list follows the taxonomic treatment (designation and order of species) and nomenclature (scientific and common names) of version 13.2 of the IOC World Bird List. Where the taxonomy proposed by the IOC World Bird List conflicts with the taxonomy followed by the IUCN (Note: The IUCN follows the taxonomy proposed by the HBW and BirdLife Taxonomic Checklist.) or the 2023 edition of The Clements Checklist of Birds of the World, the disagreement is noted next to the species's common name (for nomenclatural disagreements) or scientific name (for taxonomic disagreements).

== Classification ==
The International Ornithologists' Union (IOU) recognizes 146 species of sunbirds in 16 genera; other authorities recognise 143–147 species. This list does not include hybrid species, extinct prehistoric species, or putative species not yet accepted by the IOU.

- Genus Chalcoparia: one species
- Genus Deleornis: two species
- Genus Anthreptes: fifteen species
- Genus Hedydipna: four species
- Genus Anabathmis: three species
- Genus Dreptes: one species
- Genus Anthobaphes: one species
- Genus Cyanomitra: seven species
- Genus Chalcomitra: seven species
- Genus Nectarinia: six species
- Genus Drepanorhynchus: one species
- Genus Cinnyris: fifty-three species
- Genus Aethopyga: twenty-two species
- Genus Kurochkinegramma: one species
- Genus Arachnothera: thirteen species

== Nectariniids ==
Genus Chalcoparia – Cabanis, 1851 – 1 species
Common name	Scientific name and subspecies	Range	IUCN status and estimated population
Ruby-cheeked sunbird	C. singalensis (Gmelin, J. F., 1789) Eleven subspecies: C. s. singalensis; C. s. assamensis; C. s. bantenensis; C. s. borneana; C. s. internota; C. s. interposita; C. s. koratensis; C. s. pallida; C. s. panopsia; C. s. phoenicotis; C. s. sumatrana	South Asia, Indochina, Java, and Borneo	LC Unknown

Genus Deleornis – Wolters, 1977 – two species
Common name	Scientific name and subspecies	Range	IUCN status and estimated population
Fraser's sunbird	D. fraseri (Jardine & Selby, 1843) Three subspecies: D. f. idius; D. f. cameroonensis; D. f. fraseri	West and Central Africa	LC Unknown
Grey-headed sunbird	D. axillaris (Reichenow, 1893)	Central Africa	LC Unknown

Genus Anthreptes – Swainson, 1832 – fifteen species
Common name	Scientific name and subspecies	Range	IUCN status and estimated population
Plain-backed sunbird	A. reichenowi Gunning, 1909 Two subspecies: A. r. yokanae; A. r. reichenowi	Disjunctly in coastal East Africa and western Southern Africa	NT Unknown
Anchieta's sunbird	A. anchietae (Barboza du Bocage, 1878)	Angola east to Tanzania and Mozambique	LC Unknown
Plain sunbird	A. simplex (Müller, S., 1843)	Malay Peninsula, Borneo, and Sumatra	LC Unknown
Brown-throated sunbird	A. malacensis (Scopoli, 1786) Sixteen subspecies: A. m. malacensis; A. m. anambae; A. m. erixanthus; A. m. bornensis; A. m. mjobergi; A. m. paraguae; A. m. heliolusius; A. m. wiglesworthi; A. m. iris; A. m. chlorigaster; A. m. cagayanensis; A. m. heliocalus; A. m. celebensis; A. m. extremus; A. m. convergens; A. m. rubrigena	Southeast Asia	LC Unknown
Grey-throated sunbird	A. griseigularis Tweeddale, 1878 Two subspecies: A. g. birgitae; A. g. griseigularis	Philippines	LC Unknown
Red-throated sunbird	A. rhodolaemus Shelley, 1878	Malay Peninsula, Borneo, and Sumatra	NT Unknown
Mangrove sunbird (Note: Called mouse-brown sunbird by The Clements Checklist.)	A. gabonicus (Hartlaub, 1861)	West and Central Africa	LC Unknown
Western violet-backed sunbird	A. longuemarei (Lesson, R. P., 1831) Three subspecies: A. l. longuemarei; A. l. angolensis; A. l. nyassae	Sub-Saharan Africa	LC Unknown
Eastern violet-backed sunbird	A. orientalis Hartlaub, 1880	Horn of Africa south to Tanzania	LC Unknown
Uluguru violet-backed sunbird	A. neglectus Neumann, 1922	East Africa	LC Unknown
Violet-tailed sunbird	A. aurantius Verreaux, J. & Verreaux, É., 1851	Central Africa	LC Unknown
Little green sunbird	A. seimundi (Ogilvie-Grant, 1908) Three subspecies: A. s. kruensis; A. s. seimundi; A. s. minor	West Africa, Central Africa, and western East Africa	LC Unknown
Yellow-chinned sunbird (Note: Called yellow-throated sunbird by The Clements Checklist.)	A. rectirostris (Note: The yellow-chinned and grey-chinned sunbirds are treated as a single species, the green sunbird, by the Clements Checklist.) (Shaw, 1812)	West Africa	LC Unknown
Grey-chinned sunbird (Note: Called gray-throated sunbird by The Clements Checklist.)	A. tephrolaemus (Jardine & Fraser, 1852)	Central Africa	LC Unknown
Banded green sunbird (Note: Called banded sunbird by The Clements Checklist.)	A. rubritorques Reichenow, 1905	Tanzania	VU 1500–7000

Genus Hedydipna – Cabanis, 1851 – four species
Common name	Scientific name and subspecies	Range	IUCN status and estimated population
Collared sunbird	H. collaris (Vieillot, 1819) Nine subspecies: H. c. subcollaris; H. c. hypodila; H. c. somereni; H. c. djamdjamensis; H. c. garguensis; H. c. elachior; H. c. zambesiana; H. c. zuluensis; H. c. collaris	Sub-Saharan Africa	LC Unknown
Pygmy sunbird	H. platura (Vieillot, 1819)	West and Central Africa	LC Unknown
Nile Valley sunbird	H. metallica (Lichtenstein, M. H. C., 1823)	Egypt south to Sudan and northern Horn of Africa, southwestern Arabian peninsula	LC Unknown
Amani sunbird	H. pallidigaster (Sclater, W. L. & Moreau, 1935)	Tanzania and southeastern Kenya	EN 1500–7000

Genus Anabathmis – Reichenow, 1905 – three species
Common name	Scientific name and subspecies	Range	IUCN status and estimated population
Reichenbach's sunbird	A. reichenbachii (Hartlaub, 1857)	Extreme southern West Africa east to Central Africa	LC Unknown
Príncipe sunbird	A. hartlaubii (Hartlaub, 1857)	Príncipe	LC Unknown
Newton's sunbird	A. newtonii (Barboza du Bocage, 1887)	São Tomé Island	LC Unknown

Genus Dreptes – Reichenow, 1914 – one species
Common name	Scientific name and subspecies	Range	IUCN status and estimated population
Giant sunbird (Note: Called São Tomé sunbird by The Clements Checklist.)	D. thomensis (Barboza du Bocage, 1889)	São Tomé Island	VU 250–999

Genus Anthobaphes – Cabanis, 1851 – one species
Common name	Scientific name and subspecies	Range	IUCN status and estimated population
Orange-breasted sunbird	A. violacea (Linnaeus, 1766)	Southwestern South Africa	LC Unknown

Genus Cyanomitra – Reichenbach, 1853 – seven species
Common name	Scientific name and subspecies	Range	IUCN status and estimated population
Green-headed sunbird	C. verticalis (Latham, 1790) Four subspecies: C. v. verticalis; C. v. bohndorffi; C. v. cyanocephala; C. v. viridisplendens	West, Central, and East Africa	LC Unknown
Bannerman's sunbird	C. bannermani Grant, C. H. B. & Mackworth-Praed, 1943	Central Africa	LC Unknown
Blue-throated brown sunbird	C. cyanolaema (Jardine & Fraser, 1852) Three subspecies: C. c. magnirostrata; C. c. cyanolaema; C. c. octaviae	West and Central Africa	LC Unknown
Cameroon sunbird	C. oritis (Reichenow, 1892) Three subspecies: C. o. poensis; C. o. oritis; C. o. bansoensis	Western Cameroon, southeastern Nigeria, and Bioko	LC Unknown
Blue-headed sunbird	C. alinae Jackson, F. J., 1904 Five subspecies: C. a. derooi; C. a. kaboboensis; C. a. alinae; C. a. tanganjicae; C. a. marungensis	Eastern Rift Mountains	LC Unknown
Olive sunbird	C. olivacea (Smith, A., 1840) Eleven subspecies: C. o. guineensis; C. o. cephaelis; C. o. obscura; C. o. ragazzii; C. o. changamwensis; C. o. neglecta; C. o. granti; C. o. alfredi; C. o. sclateri; C. o. olivacina; C. o. olivacea	Sub-Saharan Africa south of the Sahel	LC Unknown
Grey sunbird (Note: Called mouse-colored sunbird by The Clements Checklist.)	C. veroxii (Smith, A., 1832) Three subspecies: C. v. fischeri; C. v. zanzibarica; C. v. veroxii	Coasts of East and Southern Africa	LC Unknown

Genus Chalcomitra – Reichenbach, 1853 – seven species
Common name	Scientific name and subspecies	Range	IUCN status and estimated population
Buff-throated sunbird	C. adelberti (Gervais, 1834) Two subspecies: C. a. adelberti; C. a. eboensis	West Africa	LC Unknown
Carmelite sunbird	C. fuliginosa (Bechstein, 1811) Two subspecies: C. f. aurea; C. f. fuliginosa	West and Central Africa	LC Unknown
Green-throated sunbird	C. rubescens (Vieillot, 1819) Three subspecies: C. r. crossensis; C. r. stangerii; C. r. rubescens	Central Africa	LC Unknown
Amethyst sunbird	C. amethystina (Shaw, 1812) Four subspecies: C. a. kalckreuthi; C. a. kirkii; C. a. deminuta; C. a. amethystina	Central, East, and Southern Africa	LC Unknown
Scarlet-chested sunbird	C. senegalensis (Linnaeus, 1766) Six subspecies: C. s. senegalensis; C. s. acik; C. s. proteus; C. s. lamperti; C. s. saturatior; C. s. gutturalis	Sub-Saharan Africa	LC Unknown
Hunter's sunbird	C. hunteri (Shelley, 1889)	Horn of Africa and East Africa	LC Unknown
Socotra sunbird	C. balfouri (Sclater, P. L. & Hartlaub, 1881)	Socotra	LC Unknown

Genus Leptocoma – Cabanis, 1851 – six species
Common name	Scientific name and subspecies	Range	IUCN status and estimated population
Purple-rumped sunbird	L. zeylonica (Linnaeus, 1766) Two subspecies: L. z. flaviventris; L. z. zeylonica	Indian subcontinent	LC Unknown
Crimson-backed sunbird	L. minima (Sykes, 1832)	Southwestern India	LC Unknown
Purple-throated sunbird	L. sperata (Note: The IUCN splits the purple-throated sunbird sensu lato into two species, the purple-throated sunbird sensu stricto (L. sperata) and the orange-lined sunbird (L. juliae).) (Linnaeus, 1766) Four subspecies: L. s. henkei; L. s. sperata; L. s. trochilus; L. s. juliae	Philippines	NE Unknown
Van Hasselt's sunbird	L. brasiliana (Gmelin, J. F., 1788) Five subspecies: L. b. brasiliana; L. b. emmae; L. b. mecynorhyncha; L. b. eumecis; L. b. axantha	Eastern Indian subcontinent and Southeast Asia	LC Unknown
Black sunbird	L. aspasia (Lesson, R. P. and Garnot, 1828) Twenty-one subspecies: L. a. talautensis; L. a. sangirensis; L. a. grayi; L. a. porphyrolaema; L. a. auriceps; L. a. auricapilla; L. a. aspasioides; L. a. proserpina; L. a. chlorolaema; L. a. mariae; L. a. cochrani; L. a. aspasia; L. a. maforensis; L. a. nigriscapularis; L. a. mysorensis; L. a. veronica; L. a. cornelia; L. a. christianae; L. a. caeruleogula; L. a. corinna; L. a. eichhorni	Eastern Indonesia and Papua New Guinea	LC Unknown
Copper-throated sunbird	L. calcostetha (Jardine, 1842)	Southeast Asia	LC Unknown

Genus Nectarinia – Illiger, 1811 – six species
Common name	Scientific name and subspecies	Range	IUCN status and estimated population
Bocage's sunbird	N. bocagii Shelley, 1879	Democratic Republic of the Congo and Angola	LC Unknown
Purple-breasted sunbird	N. purpureiventris (Reichenow, 1893)	Albertine Rift Mountains	LC Unknown
Tacazze sunbird	N. tacazze (Stanley, 1814) Two subspecies: N. t. tacazze; N. t. jacksoni	Horn of Africa and East Africa	LC Unknown
Bronzy sunbird (Note: Called bronze sunbird by The Clements Checklist and the IUCN.)	N. kilimensis Shelley, 1885 Three subspecies: N. k. kilimensis; N. t. arturi; N. t. gadowi	Central and East Africa	LC Unknown
Malachite sunbird	N. famosa (Linnaeus, 1766) Two subspecies: N. f. cupreonitens; N. f. famosa	East Africa and Southern Africa	LC Unknown
Scarlet-tufted sunbird (Note: Called red-tufted sunbird by The Clements Checklist and the IUCN.)	N. johnstoni Shelley, 1885 Four subspecies: N. j. johnstoni; N. j. dartmouthi; N. j. nyikensis; N. j. reichenowi	East Africa	LC Unknown

Genus Drepanorhynchus – Fischer, G. A. & Reichenow, 1884 – one species
Common name	Scientific name and subspecies	Range	IUCN status and estimated population
Golden-winged sunbird	D. reichenowi Fischer, G. A., 1884 Three subspecies: D. r. shellyae; D. r. lathburyi; D. r. reichenowi	East Africa	LC Unknown

Genus Cinnyris – Cuvier, 1816 – fifty-three species
Common name	Scientific name and subspecies	Range	IUCN status and estimated population
Olive-bellied sunbird	C. chloropygius (Jardine, 1842) Three subspecies: C. c. kempi; C. c. chloropygius; C. c. orphogaster	West and Central Africa	LC Unknown
Tiny sunbird	C. minullus Reichenow, 1899	West and Central Africa	LC Unknown
Eastern miombo sunbird	C. manoensis Reichenow, 1907 Two subspecies: C. m. manoensis; C. m. amicorum	East Africa	LC Unknown
Western miombo sunbird	C. gertrudis Grote, 1926	Central and East Africa	LC Unknown
Southern double-collared sunbird	C. chalybeus (Linnaeus, 1766) Two subspecies: C. c. subalaris; C. c. chalybeus	Southern Africa	LC Unknown
Neergaard's sunbird	C. neergaardi Grant, C. H. B., 1908	Southern Africa	NT 3300–6700
Rwenzori double-collared sunbird (Note: Called Stuhlmann's sunbird by The Clements Checklist and the Ruwenzori sunbird by the IUCN.)	C. stuhlmanni Reichenow, 1893 Four subspecies: C. s. stuhlmanni; C. s. graueri; C. s. chapini; C. s. schubotzi	Eastern Rift Mountains	LC Unknown
Whyte's double-collared sunbird	C. whytei (Note: Whyte's double-collared sunbird and Ludwig's double-collared sunbird are treated as a single species, the montane double-collared sunbird, by the IUCN and Clements.); Benson, 1948 Two subspecies: C. w. whytei; C. w. skye	East Africa	NE Unknown
Prigogine's double-collared sunbird	C. prigoginei MacDonald, 1958	Southeastern Democratic Republic of the Congo	NT Unknown
Ludwig's double-collared sunbird	C. ludovicensis (Barboza du Bocage, 1868)	Angola	NE Unknown
Northern double-collared sunbird	C. reichenowi Sharpe, 1891 Two subspecies: C. r. preussi; C. r. reichenowi	Western Central Africa and East Africa	LC Unknown
Greater double-collared sunbird	C. afer (Linnaeus, 1766)	Southern Africa	LC Unknown
Regal sunbird	C. regius Reichenow, 1893 Two subspecies: C. r. regius; C. r. anderseni	Albertine Rift Valley	LC Unknown
Rockefeller's sunbird	C. rockefelleri Chapin, 1932	Eastern Democratic Republic of the Congo	VU 1100–11900
Eastern double-collared sunbird	C. mediocris Shelley, 1885	Kenya and Tanzania	LC Unknown
Usambara double-collared sunbird	C. usambaricus Grote, 1922	Southeast Kenya and northeast Tanzania	NT Unknown
Forest double-collared sunbird	C. fuelleborni Reichenow, 1899 Two subspecies: C. f. fuelleborni; C. f. bensoni	East Africa	LC Unknown
Moreau's sunbird	C. moreaui Sclater, W. L., 1933	Central Tanzania	NT Unknown
Loveridge's sunbird	C. loveridgei Hartert, E. J. O., 1922	Eastern central Tanzania	EN 14000–24700
Beautiful sunbird	C. pulchellus (Note: The IUCN splits the beautiful sunbird sensu lato into two species, the gorgeous sunbird (C. melanogastrus) and beautiful sunbird sensu stricto (C. pulchellus).) (Linnaeus, 1766) Two subspecies: C. p. pulchellus; C. p. melanogastrus	West, Central, and East Africa	NE Unknown
Marico sunbird	C. mariquensis Smith, A., 1836 Three subspecies: C. m. osiris; C. m. suahelicus; C. m. mariquensis	East and Southern Africa	LC Unknown
Shelley's sunbird	C. shelleyi (Note: Hofmann's sunbird is considered a subspecies of Shelley's sunbird by the IUCN and Clements.); Alexander, 1899	East Africa	NE Unknown
Hofmann's sunbird	C. hofmanni Reichenow, 1915	Eastern Tanzania	NE Unknown
Congo sunbird	C. congensis (van Oort, 1910)	Congo Basin	LC Unknown
Red-chested sunbird	C. erythrocercus (Hartlaub, 1857)	Extreme southern Sudan to central Tanzania	LC Unknown
Black-bellied sunbird	C. nectarinioides Richmond, 1897 Two subspecies: C. n. erlangeri; C. n. nectarinioides	East Africa	LC Unknown
Purple-banded sunbird	C. bifasciatus (Shaw, 1812) Two subspecies: C. b. bifasciatus; C. b. microrhynchus	East, Central, and Southern Africa	LC Unknown
Tsavo sunbird	C. tsavoensis van Someren, 1922	Kenya and northeastern Tanzania	LC Unknown
Violet-breasted sunbird	C. chalcomelas Reichenow, 1905	Somalia and Kenya	LC Unknown
Pemba sunbird	C. pembae Reichenow, 1905	Pemba Island	LC Unknown
Orange-tufted sunbird	C. bouvieri Shelley, 1877	Central Africa	LC Unknown
Palestine sunbird	C. osea Bonaparte, 1856 Two subspecies: C. o. osea; C. o. decorsei	Arabian Peninsula and Central Africa	LC Unknown
Arabian sunbird	C. hellmayri (Note: The Arabian sunbird is treated as a subspecies of the shining sunbird by the Clement's Checklist.); Neumann, 1904 Two subspecies: C. h. kinneari; C. h. hellmayri	Arabian Peninsula	NE Unknown
Shining sunbird	C. habessinicus (Hemprich & Ehrenberg, 1828) Three subspecies: C. h. habessinicus; C. h. alter; C. h. turkanae	East Africa	NE Unknown
Splendid sunbird	C. coccinigastrus (Latham, 1801)	West and Central Africa	LC Unknown
Johanna's sunbird	C. johannae Verreaux, J. & Verreaux, É., 1851 Two subspecies: C. h. fasciatus; C. h. johannae	West and Central Africa	LC Unknown
Superb sunbird	C. superbus (Shaw, 1812) Four subspecies: C. s. ashantiensis; C. s. nigeriae; C. s. superbus; C. s. buvuma	West and Central Africa	LC Unknown
Rufous-winged sunbird	C. rufipennis (Jensen, 1983)	Central Tanzania	VU 2500–9999
Oustalet's sunbird	C. oustaleti (Barboza du Bocage, 1878) Two subspecies: C. o. oustaleti; C. o. rhodesiae	Disjunctly, in Angola, and in Tanzania and Zambia	LC Unknown
White-bellied sunbird	C. talatala Smith, A., 1836	Southern Africa	LC Unknown
Variable sunbird	C. venustus (Shaw, 1799) Five subspecies: C. v. venustus; C. v. fazoqlensis; C. v. albiventris; C. v. falkensteini; C. v. igneiventris	West, Central, and East Africa	LC Unknown
Dusky sunbird	C. fuscus Vieillot, 1819 Two subspecies: C. f. fuscus; C. f. inclusus	Southwestern Africa	LC Unknown
Ursula's sunbird	C. ursulae (Alexander, 1903)	Cameroon	LC Unknown
Bates's sunbird	C. batesi Ogilvie-Grant, 1908	West and Central Africa	LC Unknown
Copper sunbird	C. cupreus (Shaw, 1812) Two subspecies: C. c. cupreus; C. c. chalceus	West, Central, and East Africa	LC Unknown
Purple sunbird	C. asiaticus (Latham, 1790) Three subspecies: C. a. brevirostris; C. a. asiaticus; C. a. intermedius	Eastern Arabian Peninsula east to South Asia and Indochina	LC Unknown
Olive-backed sunbird	C. jugularis (Note: The IUCN splits the olive-backed sunbird sensu lato into two species, Rand's sunbird (C. idenburgi) and olive-backed sunbird sensu stricto (C. jugularis), while The Clements Checklist splits it into eight different species.) (Linnaeus, 1766) Twenty-one subspecies: C. j. andamanicus; C. j. proselius; C. j. klossi; C. j. rhizophorae; C. j. flammaxillaris; C. j. ornatus; C. j. polyclystus; C. j. aurora; C. j. obscurior; C. j. jugularis; C. j. woodi; C. j. plateni; C. j. infrenatus; C. j. robustirostris; C. j. teysmanni; C. j. frenatus; C. j. buruensis; C. j. clementiae; C. j. keiensis; C. j. idenburgi; C. j. flavigastra	Southeast Asia to Papua New Guinea and northern Australia	NE Unknown
Apricot-breasted sunbird	C. buettikoferi Hartert, E. J. O., 1896	Sumba	LC Unknown
Flame-breasted sunbird	C. solaris (Temminck, 1825) Two subspecies: C. s. exquisitus; C. s. solaris	Lesser Sunda Islands and Wetar	LC Unknown
Souimanga sunbird	C. sovimanga (Gmelin, J. F., 1788) Five subspecies: C. s. sovimanga; C. s. apolis; C. s. aldabrensis; C. s. abbotti; C. s. buchenorum	Madagascar and Seychelles	LC Unknown
Malagasy green sunbird (Note: Called Malagasy sunbird by The Clements Checklist.)	C. notatus (Note: The IUCN splits the Malagasy green sunbird into three species, the long-billed sunbird (C. notatus), Grand Comoro sunbird (C. moebii), and Moheli sunbird (C. voeltzkowi).) (Müller, P. L. S., 1776) Three subspecies: C. n. notatus; C. n. moebii; C. n. voeltzkowi	Madagascar and Comoros	NE Unknown
Seychelles sunbird	C. dussumieri (Hartlaub, 1861)	Seychelles	LC Unknown
Humblot's sunbird	C. humbloti Milne-Edwards, A. & Oustalet, 1885 Two subspecies: C. h. humbloti; C. h. mohelicus	Grande Comore and Mohéli	LC Unknown
Anjouan sunbird	C. comorensis Peters, W., 1864	Anjouan	LC Unknown
Mayotte sunbird	C. coquerellii (Hartlaub, 1860)	Mayotte	LC Unknown
Loten's sunbird	C. lotenius (Linnaeus, 1766) Two subspecies: C. l. hindustanicus; C. l. lotenius	India and Sri Lanka	LC Unknown

Genus Aethopyga – Cabanis, 1851 – twenty-two species
Common name	Scientific name and subspecies	Range	IUCN status and estimated population
Grey-hooded sunbird	A. primigenia (Hachisuka, 1941) Two subspecies: A. p. diuatae; A. p. primigenia	Mindanao	LC 20000–49999
Apo sunbird	A. boltoni (Note: The Clement's Checklist splits the Apo sunbird sensu lato into two species, Tboli sunbird (A. tibolii) and Apo sunbird sensu stricto (A. malindangensis).); Mearns, 1905 Three subspecies: A. b. malindangensis; A. b. boltoni; A. b. tibolii	Mindanao	LC 15000–24999
Lina's sunbird	A. linaraborae Kennedy, R. S., Gonzales & Miranda, 1997	Mindanao	NT Unknown
Flaming sunbird	A. flagrans Oustalet, 1876	Luzon and Catanduanes	LC Unknown
Maroon-naped sunbird	A. guimarasensis (Steere, 1890) Two subspecies: A. g. guimarasensis; A. g. daphoenonota	Negros, Panay, and Guimaras	LC Unknown
Metallic-winged sunbird	A. pulcherrima (Note: The Bohol and Luzon sunbirds are treated as a subspecies of the metallic-winged sunbird by the IUCN and Clements.); Sharpe, 1876	Central and southern Philippines	NE Unknown
Luzon sunbird	A. jefferyi (Ogilvie-Grant, 1894)	Luzon	NE Unknown
Bohol sunbird	A. decorosa (McGregor, 1907)	Bohol	NE Unknown
Elegant sunbird	A. duyvenbodei (Schlegel, 1871)	Sangihe Islands	EN 13000–29000
Lovely sunbird	A. shelleyi Sharpe, 1876	Palawan archipelago	LC Unknown
Handsome sunbird	A. bella Tweeddale, 1877 Six subspecies: A. b. flavipectus; A. b. minuta; A. b. rubrinota; A. b. bella; A. b. bonita; A. b. arolasi	Philippines	LC Unknown
Mrs. Gould's sunbird	A. gouldiae (Vigors, 1831) Four subspecies: A. g. gouldiae; A. g. isolata; A. g. dabryii; A. g. annamensis	Indochina, southern China, and Himalayan foothills	LC Unknown
Green-tailed sunbird	A. nipalensis (Hodgson, 1836) Nine subspecies: A. n. horsfieldi; A. n. nipalensis; A. n. koelzi; A. n. victoriae; A. n. karenensis; A. n. angkanensis; A. n. australis; A. n. blanci; A. n. ezrai	Indochina, southern China, and Himalayan foothills	LC Unknown
White-flanked sunbird	A. eximia (Horsfield, 1821)	Java	LC Unknown
Fork-tailed sunbird	A. christinae (Note: The IUCN splits the fork-tailed sunbird sensu lato into two species, the Hainan sunbird (A. christinae) and fork-tailed sunbird sensu stricto (A. latouchii).); Swinhoe, 1869 Three subspecies: A. c. latouchii; A. c. sokolovi; A. c. christinae	China, Vietnam, and Laos	NE Unknown
Black-throated sunbird	A. saturata (Hodgson, 1836) Ten subspecies: A. s. saturata; A. s. assamensis; A. s. galenae; A. s. petersi; A. s. sanguinipectus; A. s. anomala; A. s. wrayi; A. s. ochra; A. s. johnsi; A. s. cambodiana	Indochina, southern China, and Himalayan foothills	LC Unknown
Crimson sunbird	A. siparaja (Raffles, 1822) Fourteen subspecies: A. s. seheriae; A. s. labecula; A. s. owstoni; A. s. tonkinensis; A. s. mangini; A. s. insularis; A. s. cara; A. s. trangensis; A. s. siparaja; A. s. nicobarica; A. s. heliogona; A. s. natunae; A. s. flavostriata; A. s. beccarii	South Asia, Southeast Asia, and southern China	LC Unknown
Magnificent sunbird	A. magnifica Sharpe, 1876	Western and Central Visayas	LC Unknown
Vigors's sunbird	A. vigorsii (Sykes, 1832)	Western India	LC Unknown
Javan sunbird	A. mystacalis (Temminck, 1822)	Java	LC Unknown
Temminck's sunbird	A. temminckii (Müller, S., 1843)	Malay Peninsula, Sumatra, and Borneo	LC Unknown
Fire-tailed sunbird	A. ignicauda (Hodgson, 1836) Two subspecies: A. i. ignicauda; A. i. flavescens	Himalayas	LC Unknown

Genus Kurochkinegramma – Kashain, 1978 – one species
Common name	Scientific name and subspecies	Range	IUCN status and estimated population
Purple-naped sunbird	K. hypogrammicum (Müller, S., 1843) Five subspecies: K. h. lisettae; K. h. mariae; K. h. nuchale; K. h. hypogrammicum; K. h. natunense	Indochina, Borneo, and Sumatra	LC Unknown

Genus Arachnothera – Temminck, 1826 – thirteen species
Common name	Scientific name and subspecies	Range	IUCN status and estimated population
Little spiderhunter	A. longirostra (Latham, 1790) Ten subspecies: A. l. longirostra; A. l. sordida; A. l. pallida; A. l. cinereicollis'; A. l. zarhina; A. l. niasensis; A. l. prillwitzi; A. l. rothschildi; A. l. atita; A. l. buettikoferi	South and Southeast Asia	LC Unknown
Orange-tufted spiderhunter	A. flammifera Tweeddale, 1878 Two subspecies: A. f. flammifera; A. f. randi	Philippines	LC Unknown
Pale spiderhunter	A. dilutior Sharpe, 1876	Palawan	LC Unknown
Thick-billed spiderhunter	A. crassirostris (Reichenbach, 1853)	Malay Peninsula, Sumatra, and Borneo	LC Unknown
Long-billed spiderhunter	A. robusta Müller, S. & Schlegel, 1844 Two subspecies: A. r. robusta; A. r. armata	Malay Peninsula, Sumatra, Java, and Borneo	LC Unknown
Spectacled spiderhunter	A. flavigaster (Eyton, 1839)	Malay Peninsula, Sumatra, and Borneo	LC Unknown
Yellow-eared spiderhunter	A. chrysogenys (Temminck, 1826) Two subspecies: A. c. chrysogenys; A. c. harrissoni	Malay Peninsula, Sumatra, Java, and Borneo	LC Unknown
Naked-faced spiderhunter	A. clarae Blasius, W., 1890 Four subspecies: A. c. luzonensis; A. c. philippinensis; A. c. clarae; A. c. malindangensis	Philippines	LC Unknown
Gray-breasted spiderhunter	A. modesta (Eyton, 1839) Three subspecies: A. m. caena; A. m. modesta; A. m. concolor	Malay Peninsula, Sumatra, and Borneo	LC Unknown
Streaky-breasted spiderhunter	A. affinis (Horsfield, 1821)	Java and Bali	LC Unknown
Bornean spiderhunter	A. everetti (Note: The Bornean spiderhunter is treated as a subspecies of the streaked spiderhunter by the IUCN.) (Sharpe, 1893)	Borneo	NE Unknown
Streaked spiderhunter	A. magna (Hodgson, 1836) Five subspecies: A. m. magna; A. m. aurata; A. m. musarum; A. m. remota; A. m. pagodarum	Eastern Indian subcontinent and Indochina	NE Unknown
Whitehead's spiderhunter	A. juliae Sharpe, 1887	Borneo	LC Unknown
