= Abyssinian sunbird =

- Male in Oman

Conservation status
- Least Concern (IUCN 3.1)

Scientific classification
- Kingdom: Animalia
- Phylum: Chordata
- Class: Aves
- Order: Passeriformes
- Family: Nectariniidae
- Genus: Cinnyris
- Species: C. habessinicus

Binomial name
- Cinnyris habessinicus (Hemprich & Ehrenberg, 1828)

Synonyms
- Nectarinia habessinica

Species of bird

The Abyssinian sunbird (Cinnyris habessinicus), formerly the shining sunbird, is a species of passerine bird in the sunbird family Nectariniidae. The Arabian sunbird was formerly treated as a subspecies.

== Subspecies ==
Three subspecies are recognised:

- C. h. habessinicus (Hemprich & Ehrenberg, 1828) – northeast Sudan, Eritrea and north, central Ethiopia
- C. h. alter Neumann, 1906 – east Ethiopia and north Somalia
- C. h. turkanae Van Someren, 1920 – southeast Sudan, south Ethiopia, south Somalia, north Kenya and northeast Uganda

Two additional former subspecies, C. h. hellmaryi and C. h. kinneari, have now been split as a separate species, the Arabian sunbird C. hellmaryi.

== Description ==
The Abyssinian sunbird is highly dimorphic and has three distinct plumages, juvenile, immature and adult. Adult males in breeding plumage have brilliant metallic green upperparts and throat, a violet or blue crown, a bright red band across the breast with a narrow line of metallic blue, and blue-black wings and tail. The females are brownish-buff, paler below. These small sunbirds mainly feed on nectar and small insects.

== Distribution and habitat ==
It is found in Djibouti, Egypt, Eritrea, Ethiopia, Kenya, Somalia, South Sudan, Sudan, and Uganda.

This species prefers rocky or sandy areas and dry river beds with Acacia and Ziziphus trees.
