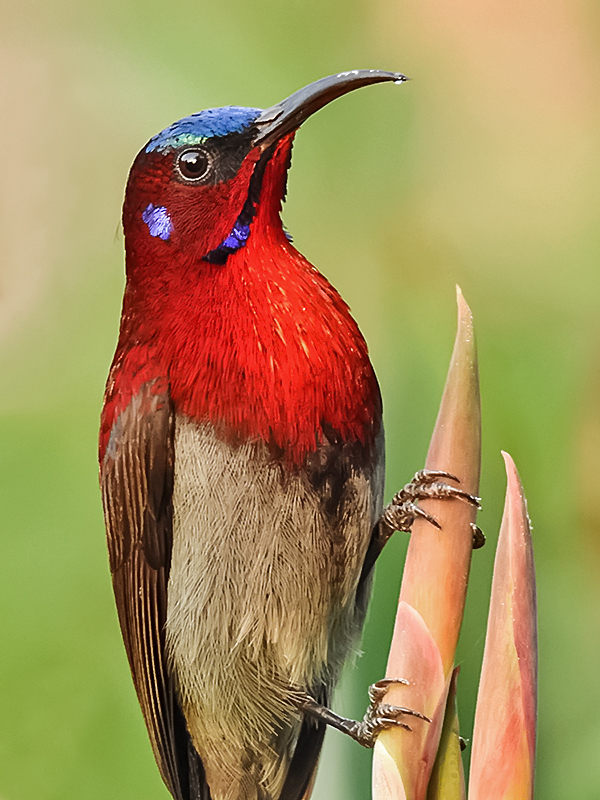
- Male Vigors's sunbird from Maharashtra, India

Scientific classification
- Kingdom: Animalia
- Phylum: Chordata
- Class: Aves
- Order: Passeriformes
- Parvorder: Passerida
- Family: Nectariniidae; Vigors, 1825

Genera
- 16, see text

= Sunbird =

Sunbirds and spiderhunters

Family of birds

Sunbirds and spiderhunters make up the family Nectariniidae of passerine birds. They are small, slender passerines from the Old World, usually with downward-curved bills. Many are brightly coloured, often with iridescent feathers, particularly in the males. Many species also have especially long tail feathers. Their range extends through most of Africa to the Middle East, South Asia, South-east Asia and southern China, to Indonesia, New Guinea and northern Australia. Species diversity is highest in equatorial regions.

There are 152 species in 16 genera. Their family name is from most sunbirds feeding largely on nectar, but they will also catch insects and spiders, especially when feeding their young. Flowers that prevent access to their nectar because of their shape (for example, very long and narrow flowers) are simply punctured at the base near the nectaries, from which the birds sip the nectar. Fruit is also part of the diet of some species. Their flight is fast and direct, thanks to their short wings.

The sunbirds have counterparts in two very distantly related groups: the hummingbirds of the Americas and the honeyeaters of Australia. The resemblances are due to convergent evolution brought about by a similar nectar-feeding lifestyle. Some sunbird species can take nectar by hovering like a hummingbird, but they usually perch to feed.

== Description ==
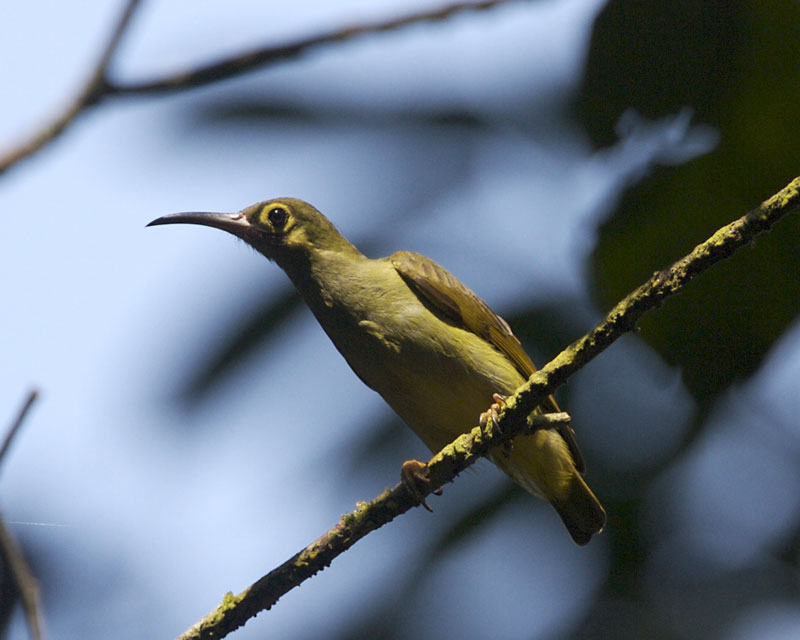
The spectacled spiderhunter is the largest species of sunbird

The family ranges in size from the 5 g (0.18 oz) black-bellied sunbird to the spectacled spiderhunter at about 45 g (1.6 oz). Like the hummingbirds, sunbirds are strongly sexually dimorphic, with the males usually brilliantly plumaged in iridescent colours. In addition to this the tails of many species are longer in the males, and overall the males are larger. Sunbirds have long thin down-curved bills and brush-tipped tubular tongues, both adaptations to their nectar feeding. The spiderhunters, of the genus Arachnothera, are distinct in appearance from the other members of the family. They are typically larger than the other sunbirds, with drab brown plumage that is the same for both sexes, and long, down-curved beaks.

In metabolic behaviour similar to that of Andes hummingbirds, species of sunbirds that live at high altitudes or latitudes will enter torpor while roosting at night, lowering their body temperature and entering a state of low activity and responsiveness.

The moulting regimes of sunbirds are complex, being different in different species. Many species have no eclipse plumage but do have juvenile plumage. Some species do show duller plumage in the off-season. In the dry months of June−August, male copper sunbirds and variable sunbirds lose much of their metallic sheen. In some instances, different populations of the same species can display variation in different molting regimes.

== Distribution and habitat ==
Sunbirds are a tropical Old World family, with representatives in Africa, Asia and Australasia. In Africa, they occur mostly in sub-Saharan Africa and Madagascar and in Egypt. In Asia, the group occurs along the coast of the Red Sea to the Palestine region and along the Mediterranean up to Beirut, with a gap in their distribution across inland Syria and Iraq, and resuming in Iran, from where the group occurs continuously as far as southern China and Indonesia. In Australasia, they occur in New Guinea, north eastern Australia and the Solomon Islands. They are generally not found on oceanic islands, with the exception of the Seychelles. The greatest variety of species is found in Africa, where the group probably arose. Most species are sedentary or short-distance seasonal migrants. Sunbirds occur over the entire family's range, whereas the spiderhunters are restricted to Asia.

The sunbirds and spiderhunters occupy a wide range of habitats, with a majority of species being found in primary rainforest, but other habitats used by the family including disturbed secondary forest, open woodland, open scrub and savannah, coastal scrub and alpine forest. Some species have readily adapted to human modified landscapes such as plantations, gardens and agricultural land. Many species are able to occupy a wide range of habitats from sea level to 4,900 m (16,100 ft).

== Behaviour and ecology ==
Sunbird are active diurnal birds that generally occur in pairs or occasionally in small family groups. A few species occasionally gather in larger groups, and sunbird will join with other birds to mob potential predators, although sunbirds will also aggressively target other species, even if they are not predators, when defending their territories.

=== Breeding ===
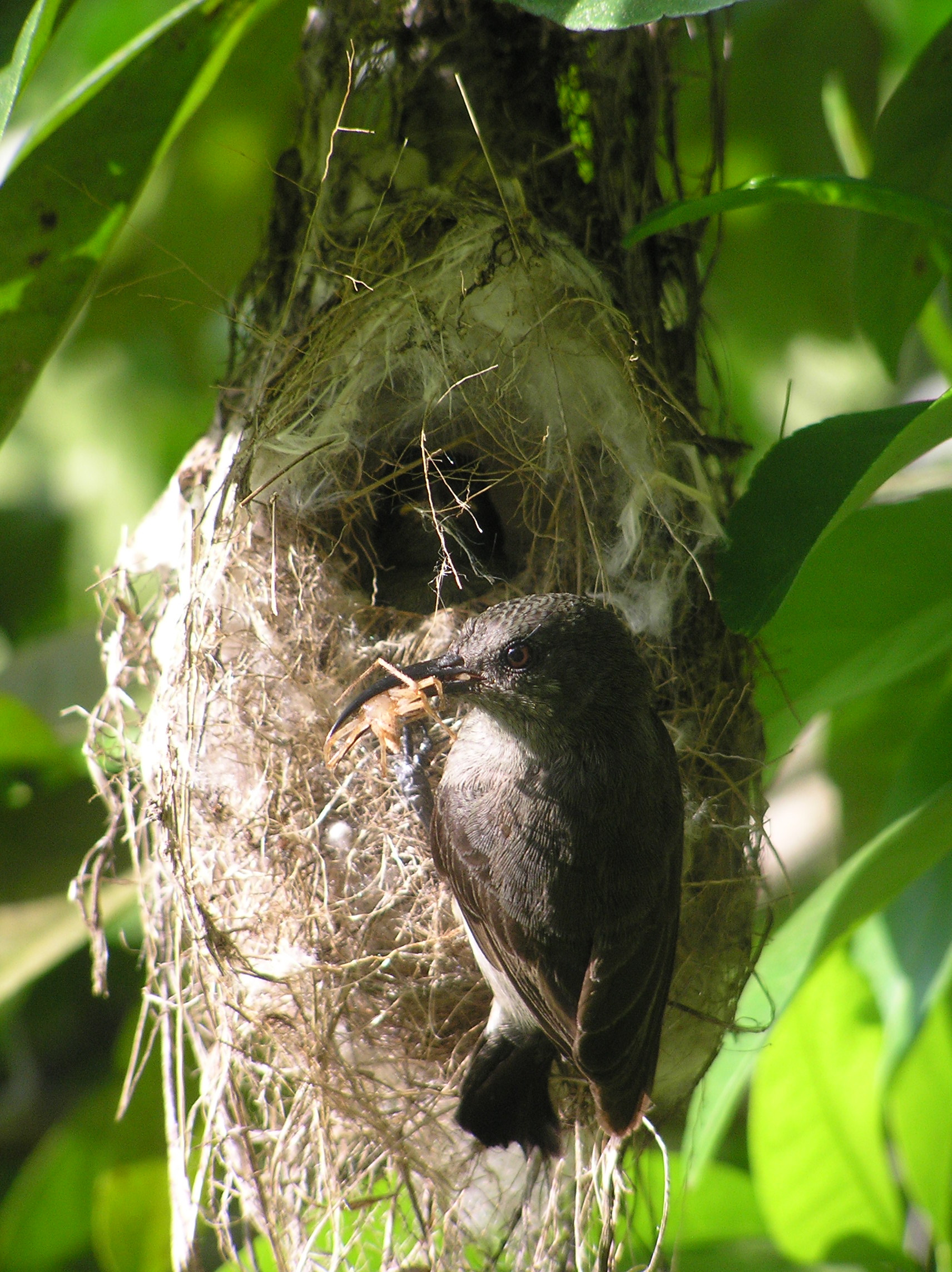
Female Seychelles sunbird at the nest with prey

Sunbirds that breed outside of the equatorial regions are mostly seasonal breeders, with the majority of them breeding in the wet season. This timing reflects the increased availability of insect prey for the growing young. Where species, like the buff-throated sunbird, breed in the dry season, it is thought to be associated with the flowering of favoured food plants. Species of sunbird in the equatorial areas breed throughout the year. They are generally monogamous and often territorial, although a few species of sunbirds have lekking behaviour. The nests of sunbirds are generally purse-shaped, enclosed, suspended from thin branches with generous use of spiderweb. The nests of the spiderhunters are different, both from the sunbirds and in some cases from each other. Some, like the little spiderhunter, are small woven cups attached to the underside of large leaves; that of the yellow-eared spiderhunter is similarly attached but is a long tube. The nests of spiderhunters are inconspicuous, in contrast to those of the other sunbirds which are more visible. In most species the female alone constructs the nest. Up to four eggs are laid. The female builds the nest and incubates the eggs alone, although the male assists in rearing the nestlings. In the spiderhunters both sexes help to incubate the eggs. The nests of sunbirds and spiderhunters are often targeted by brood parasites such as cuckoos and honeyguides.

=== Pollination ===
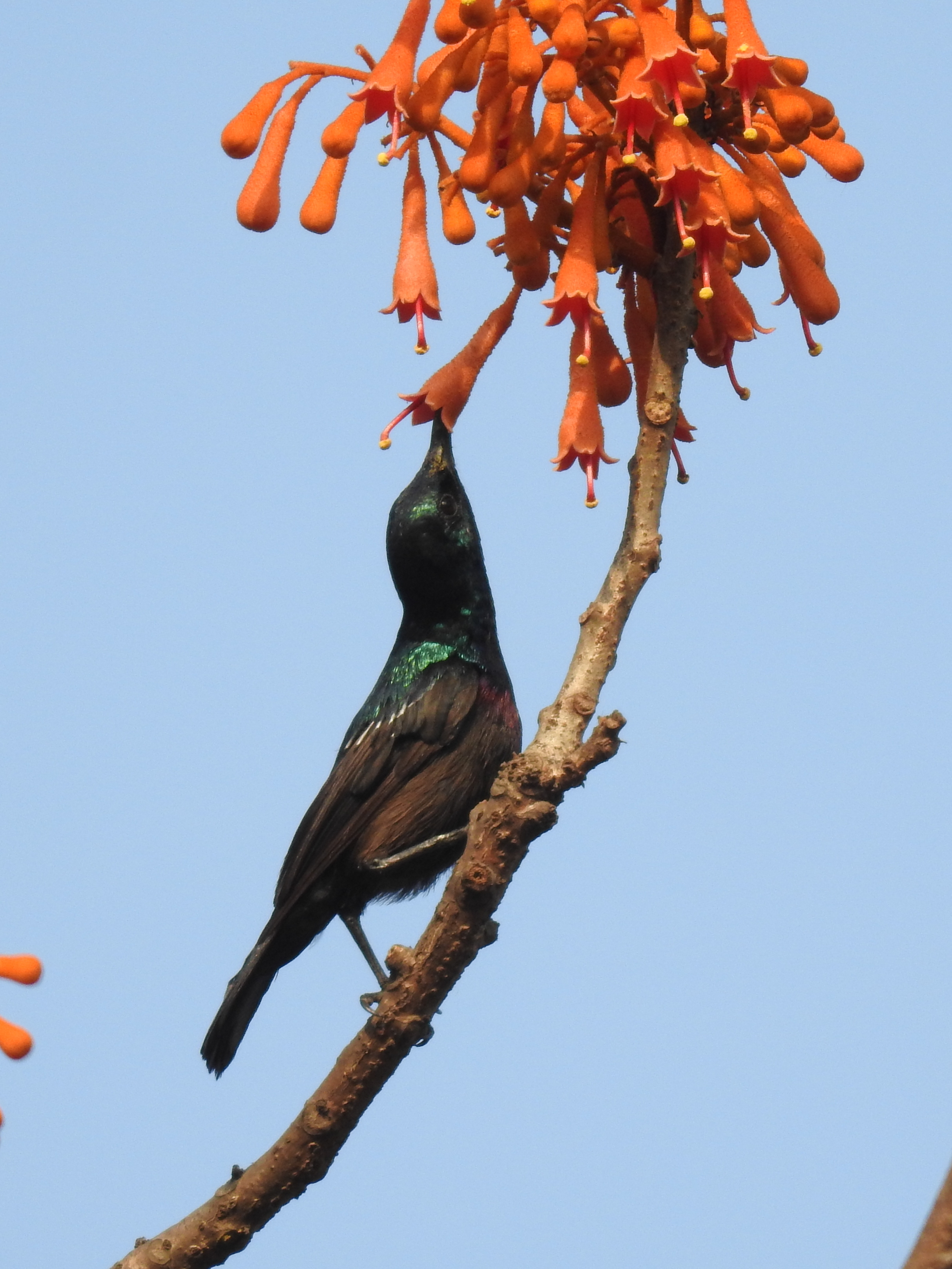
Sunbird drinking nectar from typical bird-pollinated flower

As nectar is a primary food source for sunbirds, they are important pollinators in African ecosystems. Sunbird-pollinated flowers are typically long, tubular, and red-to-orange in colour, showing convergent evolution with many hummingbird-pollinated flowers in the Americas. A key difference is that sunbirds cannot hover, so sunbird-pollinated flowers and inflorescences are typically sturdier than hummingbird-pollinated flowers, with an appropriate landing spot from which the bird can feed. Sunbirds are critical pollinators for many iconic African plants, including proteas, aloes, Erica, Erythrina coral trees, and Strelitzia flowers. Specialization on sunbirds vs other pollinators is thought to have contributed to plant speciation, including the exceptionally high floral diversity in southern Africa.

== Relationship with humans ==
Seven species are considered to be threatened with extinction. Most species are fairly resistant to changes in habitat, and the family is not sought after by the cagebird trade as they have what is considered an unpleasant song and are tricky to keep alive. Sunbirds are considered attractive birds and readily enter gardens where flowering plants are planted to attract them. There are a few negative interactions, for example the scarlet-chested sunbird is considered a pest in cocoa plantations as it spreads parasitic mistletoes.

== List of genera ==
The family contains 152 species divided into 16 genera: For more detail, see list of sunbird species.

Image	Genus	Species
	Chalcoparia Cabanis, 1851	Ruby-cheeked sunbird, Chalcoparia singalensis (monotypic)
	Deleornis Wolters, 1977	Fraser's sunbird, Deleornis fraseri; Grey-headed sunbird, Deleornis axillaris
	Anthreptes Swainson, 1832	15 species: Plain-backed sunbird, Anthreptes reichenowi; Anchieta's sunbird, Anthreptes anchietae; Plain sunbird, Anthreptes simplex; Brown-throated sunbird, Anthreptes malacensis; Grey-throated sunbird, Anthreptes griseigularis; Red-throated sunbird, Anthreptes rhodolaemus; Mangrove sunbird, Anthreptes gabonicus; Western violet-backed sunbird, Anthreptes longuemarei; Eastern violet-backed sunbird, Anthreptes orientalis; Uluguru violet-backed sunbird, Anthreptes neglectus; Violet-tailed sunbird, Anthreptes aurantius; Little green sunbird, Anthreptes seimundi; Yellow-chinned sunbird, Anthreptes rectirostris; Grey-chinned sunbird, Anthreptes tephrolaemus; Banded green sunbird, Anthreptes rubritorques
	Hedydipna Cabanis, 1851	Collared sunbird, Hedydipna collaris; Pygmy sunbird, Hedydipna platura; Nile Valley sunbird, Hedydipna metallica; Amani sunbird, Hedydipna pallidigaster
	Anabathmis Reichenow, 1905	Reichenbach's sunbird, Anabathmis reichenbachii; Príncipe sunbird, Anabathmis hartlaubii; Newton's sunbird, Anabathmis newtonii
	Dreptes Illiger, 1811	Giant sunbird, Dreptes thomensis (monotypic)
	Anthobaphes Cabanis, 1851	Orange-breasted sunbird, Anthobaphes violacea (monotypic)
	Cyanomitra Reichenbach, 1853	Green-headed sunbird, Cyanomitra verticalis; Bannerman's sunbird, Cyanomitra bannermani; Blue-throated brown sunbird, Cyanomitra cyanolaema; Cameroon sunbird, Cyanomitra oritis; Blue-headed sunbird, Cyanomitra alinae; Olive sunbird, Cyanomitra olivacea; Grey sunbird, Cyanomitra veroxii
	Chalcomitra Reichenbach, 1853	Buff-throated sunbird, Chalcomitra adelberti; Carmelite sunbird, Chalcomitra fuliginosa; Green-throated sunbird, Chalcomitra rubescens; Amethyst sunbird, Chalcomitra amethystina; Scarlet-chested sunbird, Chalcomitra senegalensis; Hunter's sunbird, Chalcomitra hunteri; Socotra sunbird, Chalcomitra balfouri
	Leptocoma Cabanis, 1851	Purple-rumped sunbird, Leptocoma zeylonica; Crimson-backed sunbird, Leptocoma minima; Purple-throated sunbird, Leptocoma sperata; Van Hasselt's sunbird, Leptocoma brasiliana; Black sunbird, Leptocoma aspasia; Copper-throated sunbird, Leptocoma calcostetha
	Nectarinia Illiger, 1811	Bocage's sunbird, Nectarinia bocagii; Purple-breasted sunbird, Nectarinia purpureiventris; Tacazze sunbird, Nectarinia tacazze; Bronze sunbird, Nectarinia kilimensis; Malachite sunbird, Nectarinia famosa; Scarlet-tufted sunbird, Nectarinia johnstoni
	Drepanorhynchus Fischer & Reichenow, 1884	Golden-winged sunbird, Drepanorhynchus reichenowi (monotypic)
	Cinnyris Cuvier, 1816	63 species: Olive-bellied sunbird, Cinnyris chloropygius; Tiny sunbird, Cinnyris minullus; Eastern miombo sunbird, Cinnyris manoensis; Western miombo sunbird, Cinnyris gertrudis; Southern double-collared sunbird, Cinnyris chalybeus; Neergaard's sunbird, Cinnyris neergaardi; Rwenzori double-collared sunbird, Cinnyris stuhlmanni; Whyte's double-collared sunbird, Cinnyris whytei; Prigogine's double-collared sunbird, Cinnyris prigoginei; Ludwig's double-collared sunbird, Cinnyris ludovicensis; Northern double-collared sunbird, Cinnyris reichenowi; Greater double-collared sunbird, Cinnyris afer; Regal sunbird, Cinnyris regius; Rockefeller's sunbird, Cinnyris rockefelleri; Eastern double-collared sunbird, Cinnyris mediocris; Usambara double-collared sunbird, Cinnyris usambaricus; Forest double-collared sunbird, Cinnyris fuelleborni; Moreau's sunbird, Cinnyris moreaui; Beautiful sunbird, Cinnyris pulchellus; Gorgeous sunbird Cinnyris melanogastrus; Loveridge's sunbird, Cinnyris loveridgei; Marico sunbird, Cinnyris mariquensis; Shelley's sunbird, Cinnyris shelleyi; Congo sunbird, Cinnyris congensis; Red-chested sunbird, Cinnyris erythrocercus; Black-bellied sunbird, Cinnyris nectarinioides; Purple-banded sunbird, Cinnyris bifasciatus; Tsavo sunbird, Cinnyris tsavoensis; Violet-breasted sunbird, Cinnyris chalcomelas; Pemba sunbird, Cinnyris pembae; Orange-tufted sunbird, Cinnyris bouvieri; Palestine sunbird, Cinnyris osea; Arabian sunbird, Cinnyris hellmayri; Shining sunbird, Cinnyris habessinicus; Splendid sunbird, Cinnyris coccinigastrus; Johanna's sunbird, Cinnyris johannae; Superb sunbird, Cinnyris superbus; Rufous-winged sunbird, Cinnyris rufipennis; Oustalet's sunbird, Cinnyris oustaleti; White-bellied sunbird, Cinnyris talatala; Variable sunbird, Cinnyris venustus; Dusky sunbird, Cinnyris fuscus; Ursula's sunbird, Cinnyris ursulae; Bates's sunbird, Cinnyris batesi; Copper sunbird, Cinnyris cupreus; Purple sunbird, Cinnyris asiaticus; Olive-backed sunbird, Cinnyris jugularis; Apricot-breasted sunbird, Cinnyris buettikoferi; Flame-breasted sunbird, Cinnyris solaris; Souimanga sunbird, Cinnyris sovimanga; Seychelles sunbird, Cinnyris dussumieri; Malagasy green sunbird, Cinnyris notatus; Humblot's sunbird, Cinnyris humbloti; Anjouan sunbird, Cinnyris comorensis; Mayotte sunbird, Cinnyris coquerellii; Loten's sunbird, Cinnyris lotenius
	Aethopyga Cabanis, 1851	22 species: Grey-hooded sunbird, Aethopyga primigenia; Apo sunbird, Aethopyga boltoni; Lina's sunbird, Aethopyga linaraborae; Flaming sunbird, Aethopyga flagrans; Maroon-naped sunbird, Aethopyga guimarasensis; Metallic-winged sunbird, Aethopyga pulcherrima; Luzon sunbird, Aethopyga jefferyi; Bohol sunbird, Aethopyga decorosa; Elegant sunbird, Aethopyga duyvenbodei; Lovely sunbird, Aethopyga shelleyi; Handsome sunbird, Aethopyga bella; Mrs. Gould's sunbird, Aethopyga gouldiae; Green-tailed sunbird, Aethopyga nipalensis; White-flanked sunbird, Aethopyga eximia; Fork-tailed sunbird, Aethopyga christinae; Black-throated sunbird, Aethopyga saturata; Crimson sunbird, Aethopyga siparaja; Magnificent sunbird Aethopyga magnifica; Vigors's sunbird, Aethopyga vigorsii; Javan sunbird, Aethopyga mystacalis; Temminck's sunbird, Aethopyga temminckii; Fire-tailed sunbird, Aethopyga ignicauda
	Kurochkinegramma Kashain, 1978	Purple-naped spiderhunter, Kurochkinegramma hypogrammicum (monotypic)
	Arachnothera Temminck, 1826	13 species: Little spiderhunter, Arachnothera longirostra; Orange-tufted spiderhunter, Arachnothera flammifera; Pale spiderhunter, Arachnothera dilutior; Thick-billed spiderhunter, Arachnothera crassirostris; Long-billed spiderhunter, Arachnothera robusta; Spectacled spiderhunter, Arachnothera flavigaster; Yellow-eared spiderhunter, Arachnothera chrysogenys; Naked-faced spiderhunter, Arachnothera clarae; Grey-breasted spiderhunter, Arachnothera modesta; Streaky-breasted spiderhunter, Arachnothera affinis; Bornean spiderhunter, Arachnothera everetti; Streaked spiderhunter, Arachnothera magna; Whitehead's spiderhunter, Arachnothera juliae
