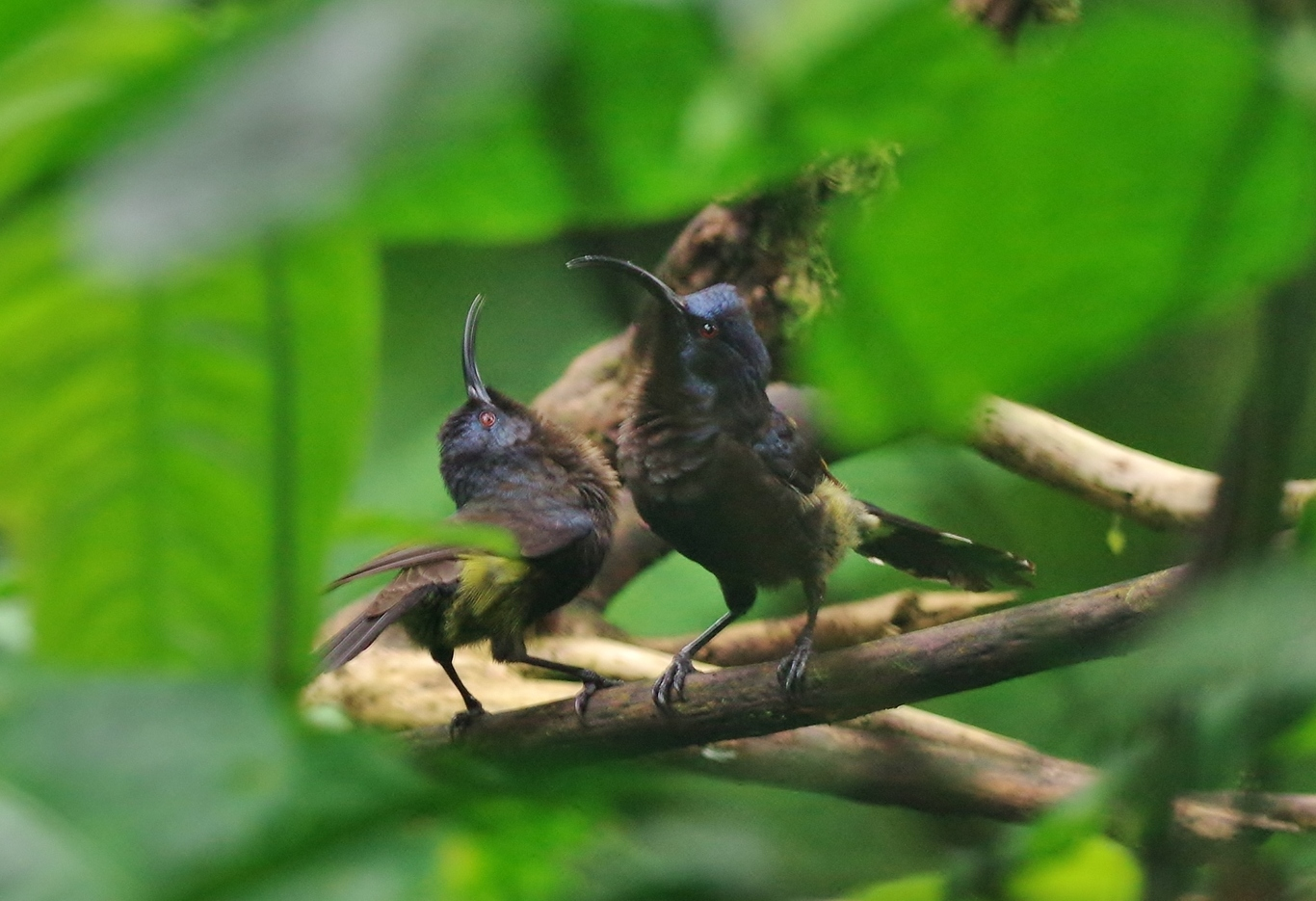

Conservation status
- Vulnerable (IUCN 3.1)

Scientific classification
- Kingdom: Animalia
- Phylum: Chordata
- Class: Aves
- Order: Passeriformes
- Family: Nectariniidae
- Genus: Dreptes; Reichenow, 1914
- Species: D. thomensis

Binomial name
- Dreptes thomensis (Barbosa du Bocage, 1889)
- range

Synonyms
- Nectarinia thomensis Barboza du Bocage, 1889

= Giant sunbird =

Species of bird

The giant sunbird (Dreptes thomensis) is a species of bird in the family Nectariniidae. It is the only species in the genus Dreptes. It is endemic to the island of São Tomé (São Tomé and Príncipe), where it occurs in the central massif.

Its natural habitats are subtropical or tropical moist lowland forest and subtropical or tropical moist montane forests. It is threatened by habitat loss. The species was first described by José Vicente Barbosa du Bocage in 1889.
