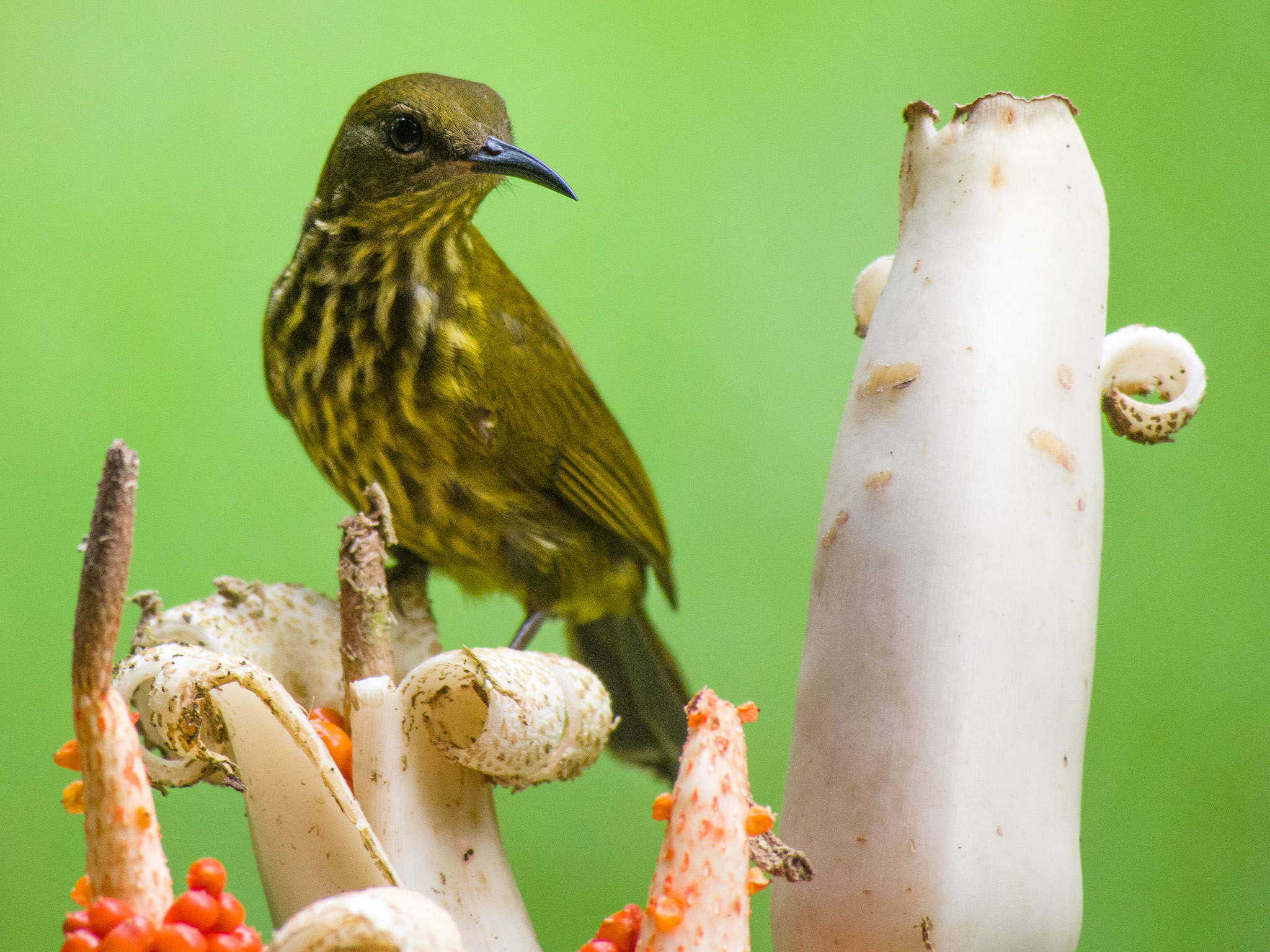

Conservation status
- Least Concern (IUCN 3.1)

Scientific classification
- Kingdom: Animalia
- Phylum: Chordata
- Class: Aves
- Order: Passeriformes
- Family: Nectariniidae
- Genus: Kurochkinegramma; Kashain, 1978
- Species: K. hypogrammicum

Binomial name
- Kurochkinegramma hypogrammicum (Müller, S, 1843)

= Purple-naped spiderhunter =

Species of bird

The purple-naped spiderhunter or purple-naped sunbird (Kurochkinegramma hypogrammicum) is a species of bird in the family Nectariniidae. It is the only species in the genus Kurochkinegramma. It is found in Southeast Asia from Myanmar to Sumatra and Borneo. Its natural habitat is subtropical or tropical moist lowland forests.

A study published in 2011 appeared to show that the purple-naped spiderhunter was phylogenetically nested within the genus Arachnothera. A subsequent 2017 study, conducted by some of the same authors and using additional sequence data, found that the purple-naped spiderhunter occupied a basal position to Arachnothera. It was formerly placed in the genus Hypogramma until it was realised that the name was preoccupied within Lepidoptera.
