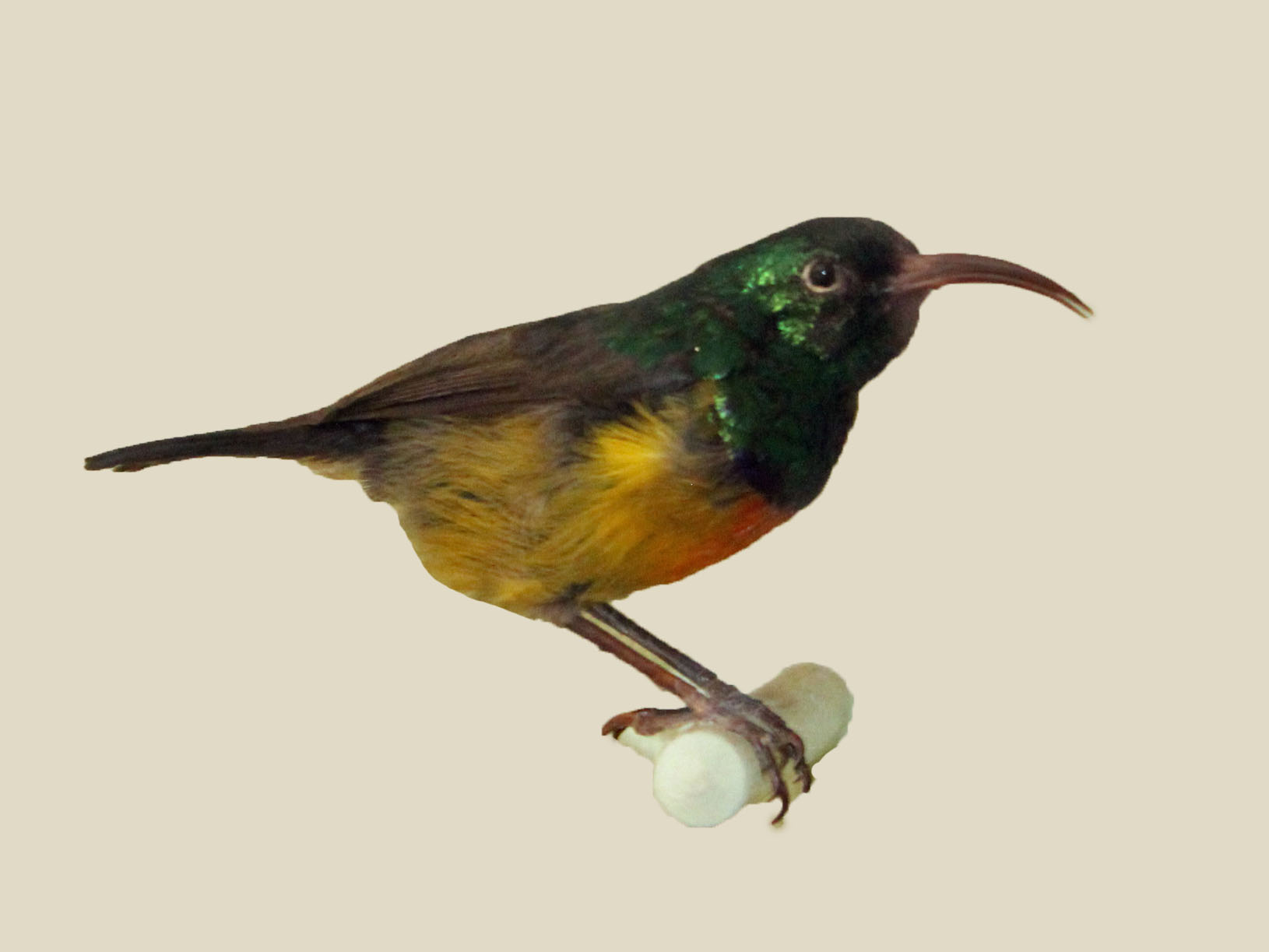
- Male specimen Nairobi National Museum
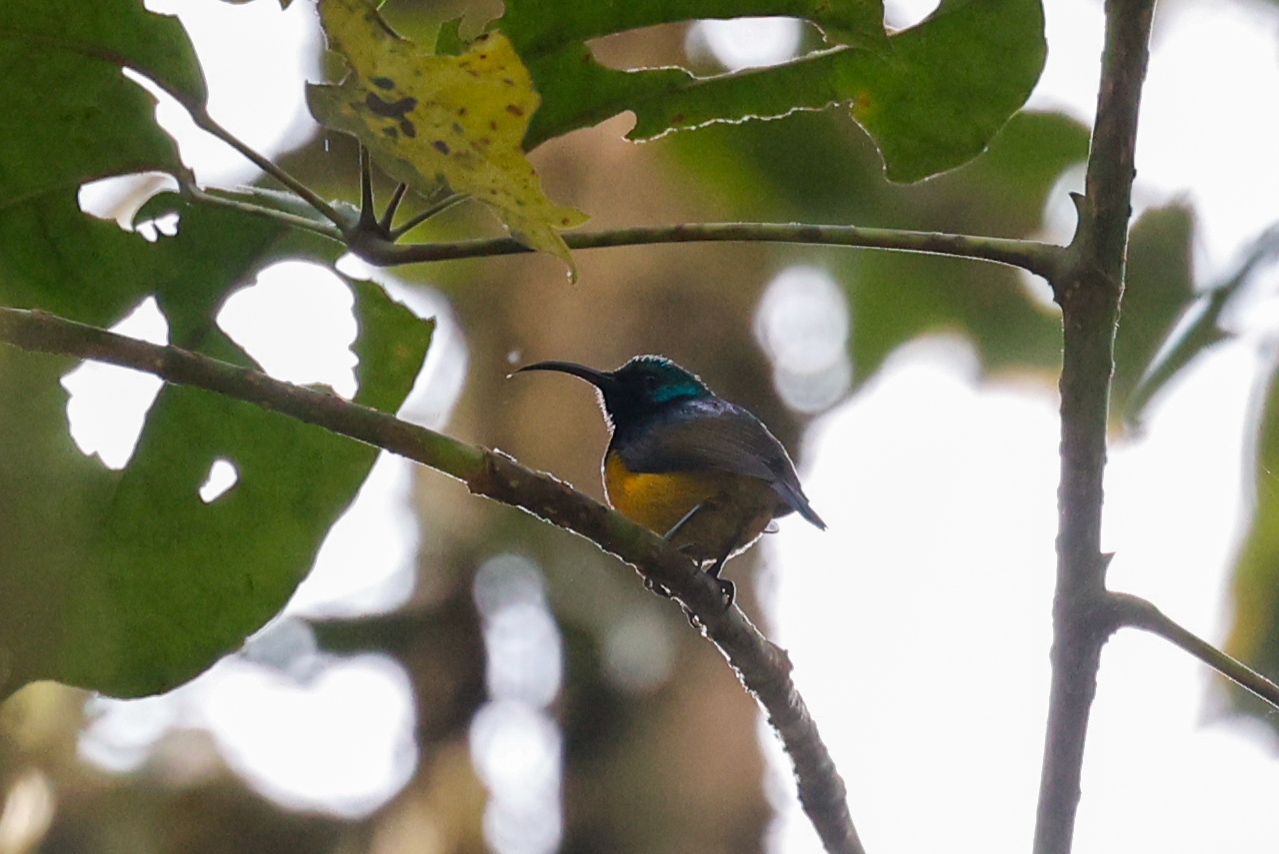

Conservation status
- Endangered (IUCN 3.1)

Scientific classification
- Kingdom: Animalia
- Phylum: Chordata
- Class: Aves
- Order: Passeriformes
- Family: Nectariniidae
- Genus: Cinnyris
- Species: C. loveridgei

Binomial name
- Cinnyris loveridgei Hartert, 1922

Synonyms
- Nectarinia loveridgei

= Loveridge's sunbird =

Species of bird

Loveridge's sunbird (Cinnyris loveridgei) is a species of bird in the family Nectariniidae. It is endemic to Tanzania.

Its natural habitat is subtropical or tropical moist montane forests. It is threatened by habitat loss.

The common name and Latin binomial commemorate the American herpetologist Arthur Loveridge .
