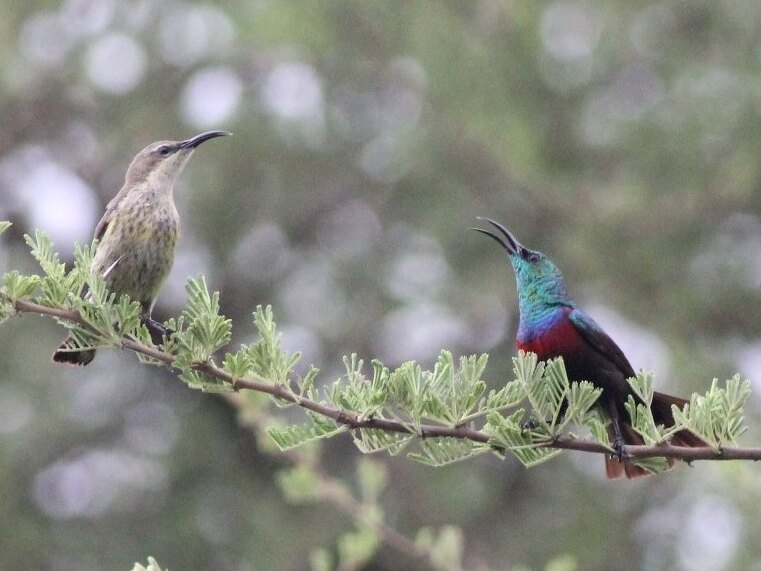

Conservation status
- Least Concern (IUCN 3.1)

Scientific classification
- Kingdom: Animalia
- Phylum: Chordata
- Class: Aves
- Order: Passeriformes
- Family: Nectariniidae
- Genus: Cinnyris
- Species: C. shelleyi

Binomial name
- Cinnyris shelleyi Alexander, 1899

Synonyms
- Nectarinia shelleyi; Nectarinia hofmanni

= Shelley's sunbird =

Species of bird

Shelley's sunbird (Cinnyris shelleyi) is a species of bird in the sunbird family Nectariniidae. It is found in Democratic Republic of the Congo, Malawi, Mozambique, Tanzania, Zambia and Zimbabwe. The species is named after George Ernest Shelley, an English ornithologist and nephew of poet Percy Bysshe Shelley.

== Taxonomy ==
Shelley's sunbird was formally described in 1899 by the explorer and ornithologist Boyd Alexander under the current binomial name Cinnyris shelleyi based on a specimen collected near the Zambezi River, 60 mi (97 km) downstrean of the junction of the river with the Kafue River. The bird is named after the English ornithologist George Ernest Shelley who had written a book on the sunbirds.

Two subspecies are recognised:

- C. s. shelleyi Alexander, 1899 – southeast DR Congo to southeast Tanzania, east Zambia, Malawi, and north Mozambique
- C. s. hofmanni Reichenow, 1915 – east Tanzania

The subspecies C. s. hofmanni has sometimes been considered as a separate species, Hofmann's sunbird.
