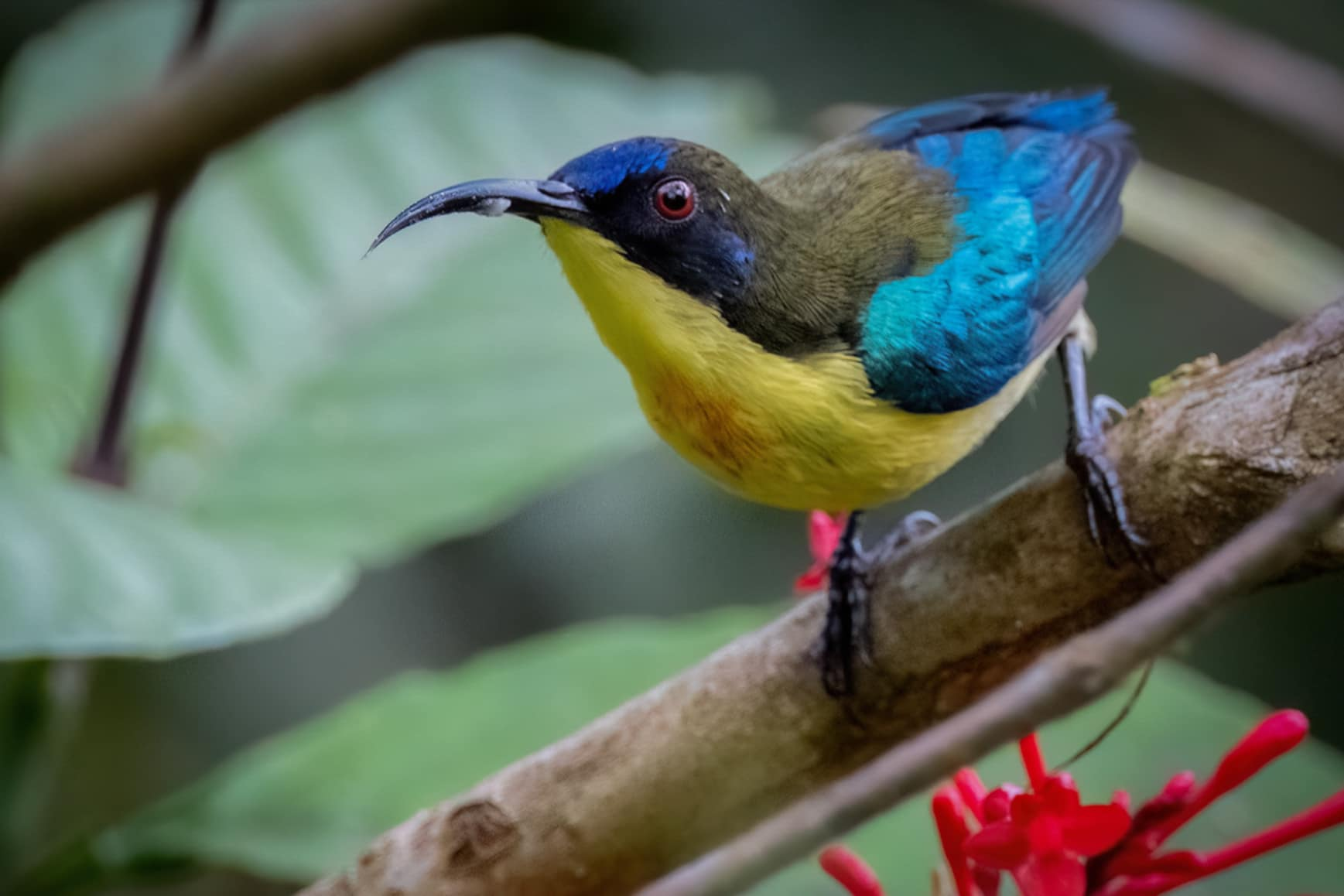
- ssp. jefferyi
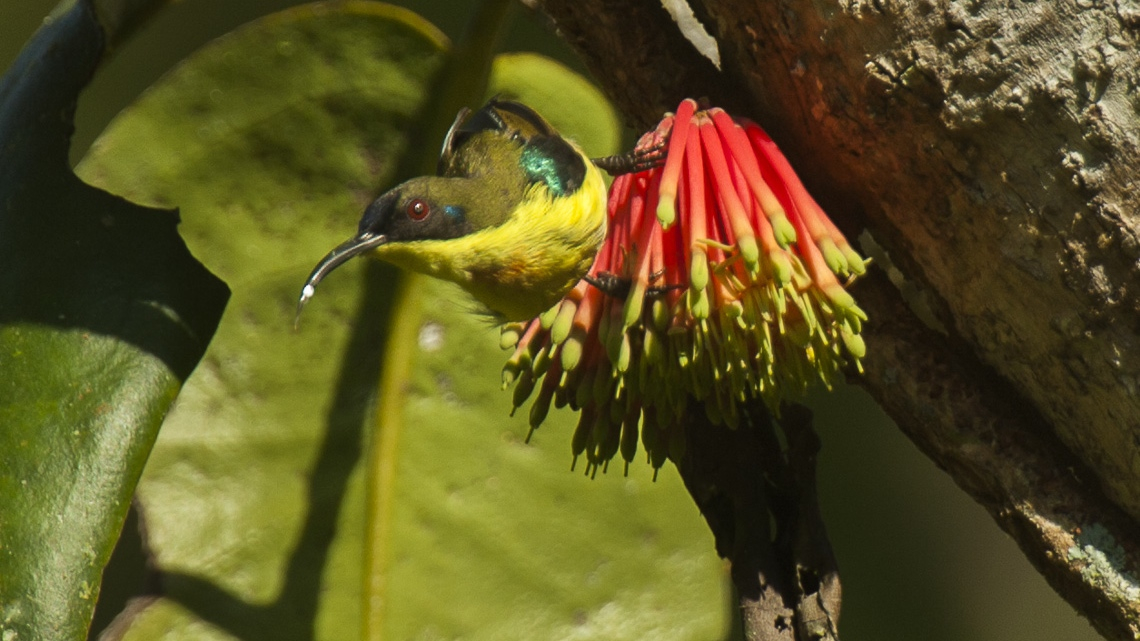
- ssp. pulcherrima

Conservation status
- Least Concern (IUCN 3.1)

Scientific classification
- Kingdom: Animalia
- Phylum: Chordata
- Class: Aves
- Order: Passeriformes
- Family: Nectariniidae
- Genus: Aethopyga
- Species: A. pulcherrima

Binomial name
- Aethopyga pulcherrima Sharpe, 1876
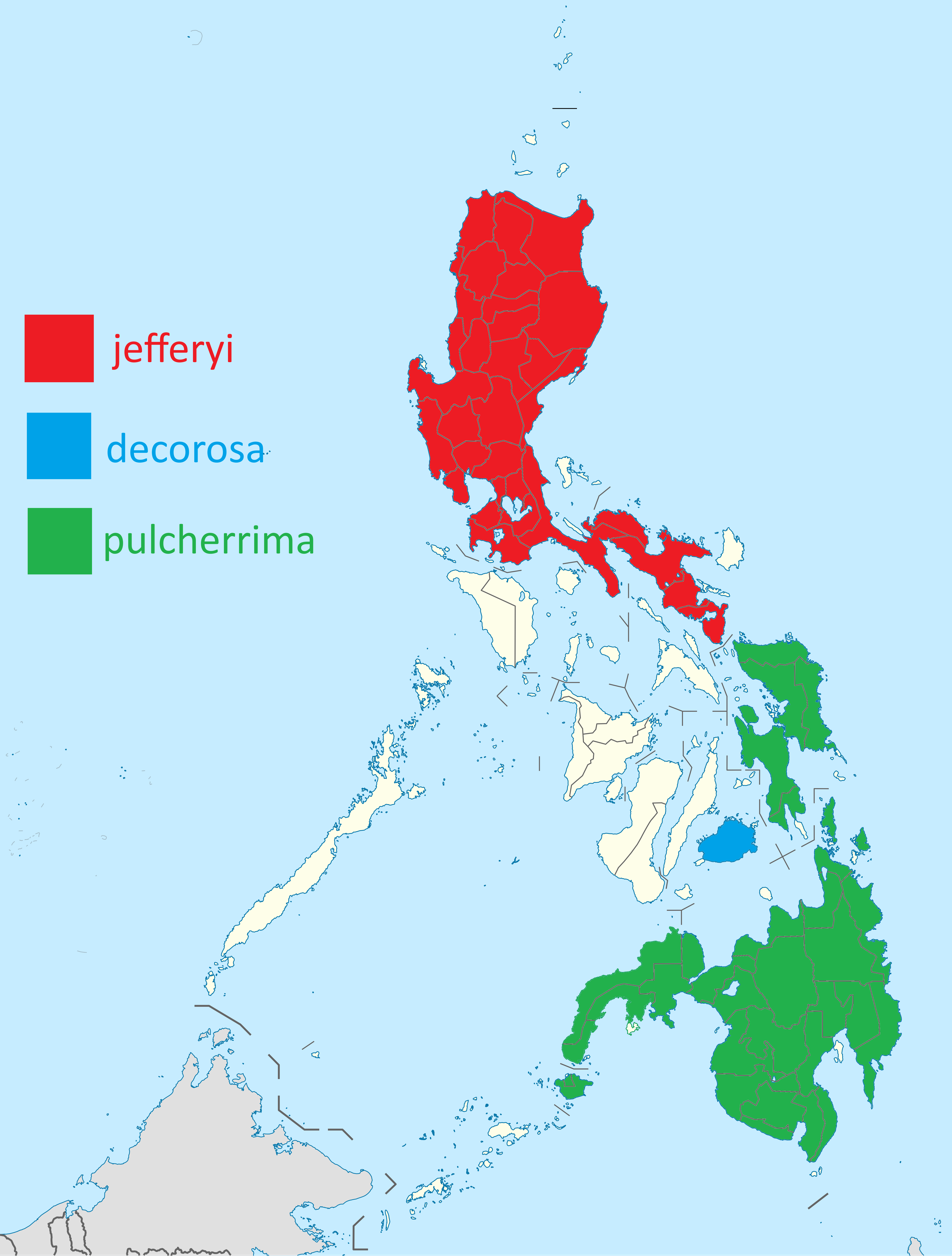

= Metallic-winged sunbird =

Species of bird

The metallic-winged sunbird (Aethopyga pulcherrima) is a species of bird in the family Nectariniidae. It is endemic to the Philippines.

Its natural habitats are tropical moist lowland forests and tropical moist montane forests. This species was formerly three species named the Luzon sunbird, Mindanao sunbird and Bohol sunbird but has since been lumped into a single species.

== Description and taxonomy ==
The metallic-winged sunbird was formally described in 1876 by the English ornithologist Richard Bowdler Sharpe based on specimens collected on the island of Basilan by members of an expedition to the Philippines led by the American ornithologist Joseph Beal Steere. Sharpe coined the binomial name Aethopyga pulcherrima, where the specific epithet is from Latin pulcherrimus meaning "very beautiful".

Three subspecies are recognised:

- A. p. pulcherrima Sharpe, 1876 – Eastern Visayas and Mindanao group (central, south Philippines, formerly called the Mindanao sunbird); irridiscent blue only on shoulder
- A. p. jefferyi (Ogilvie-Grant, 1894) – montane Luzon (north Philippines, formerly considered as a separate species, the Luzon sunbird); irridiscent blue encompasses the entire wing and rump
- A. p. decorosa (McGregor, 1907) – Bohol (central south Philippines, formerly considered as a separate species, the Bohol sunbird); irridiscent blue encompasses the entire wing and rump but much paler than the Luzon sunbird

== Ecology and behavior ==
Seen alone or are part of mixed flocks. This species is often observed foranging on flowers but it is believed that this species also feeds on insects. A single nest recorded contained 3 eggs which were described as dull pink with gray mottling.

== Habitat and conservation status ==
Its natural habitat is tropical moist lowland forests and tropical moist montane forests up to 2,000 meters above sea level although the altitudes differ per subspecies. The Bohol and Mindanao sunbirds were more often seen in lowlands while the Luzon sunbird is only recorded above 900 meters above sea level.

It is assessed as a Least-concern species by the International Union for Conservation of Nature as it is fairly common in its range and tolerant of disturbed habitat.
