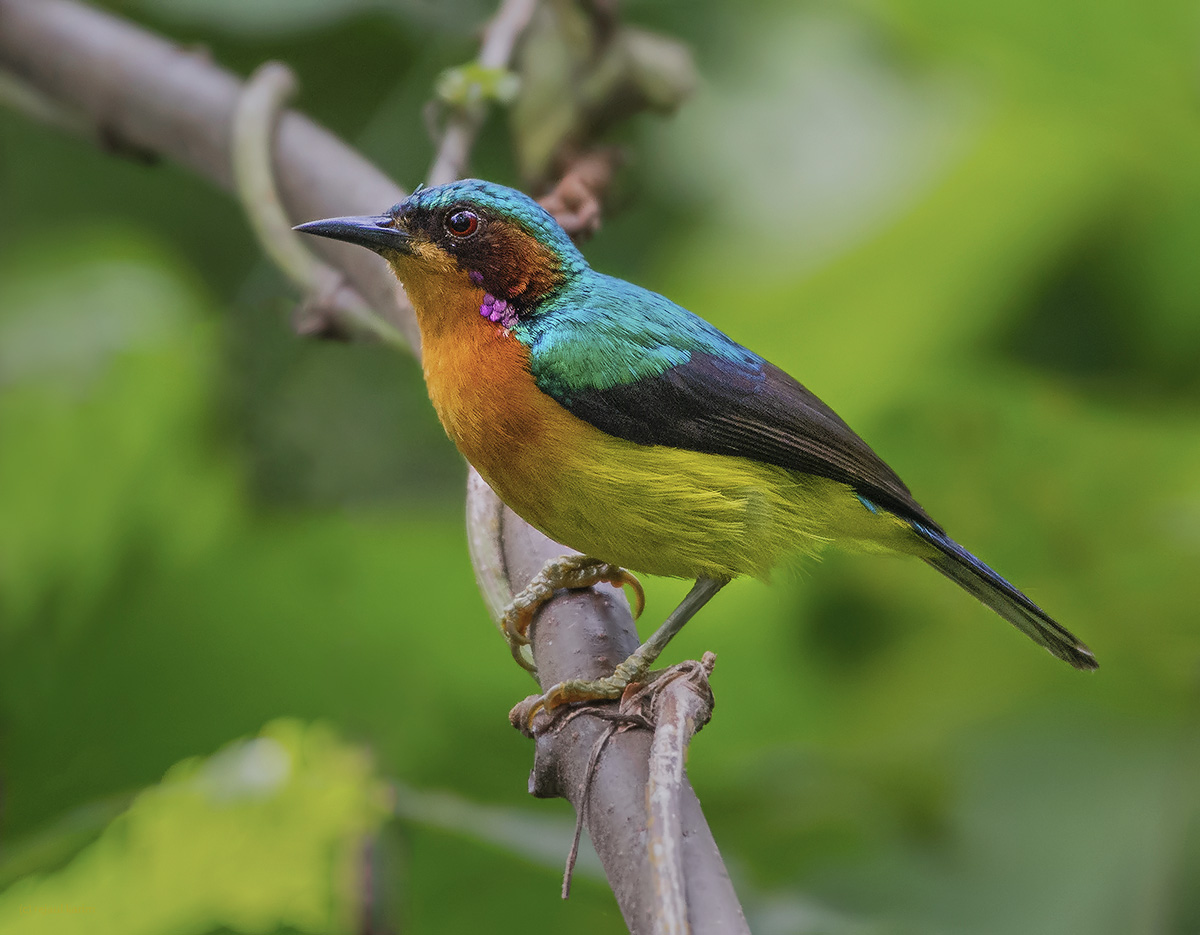
- Male
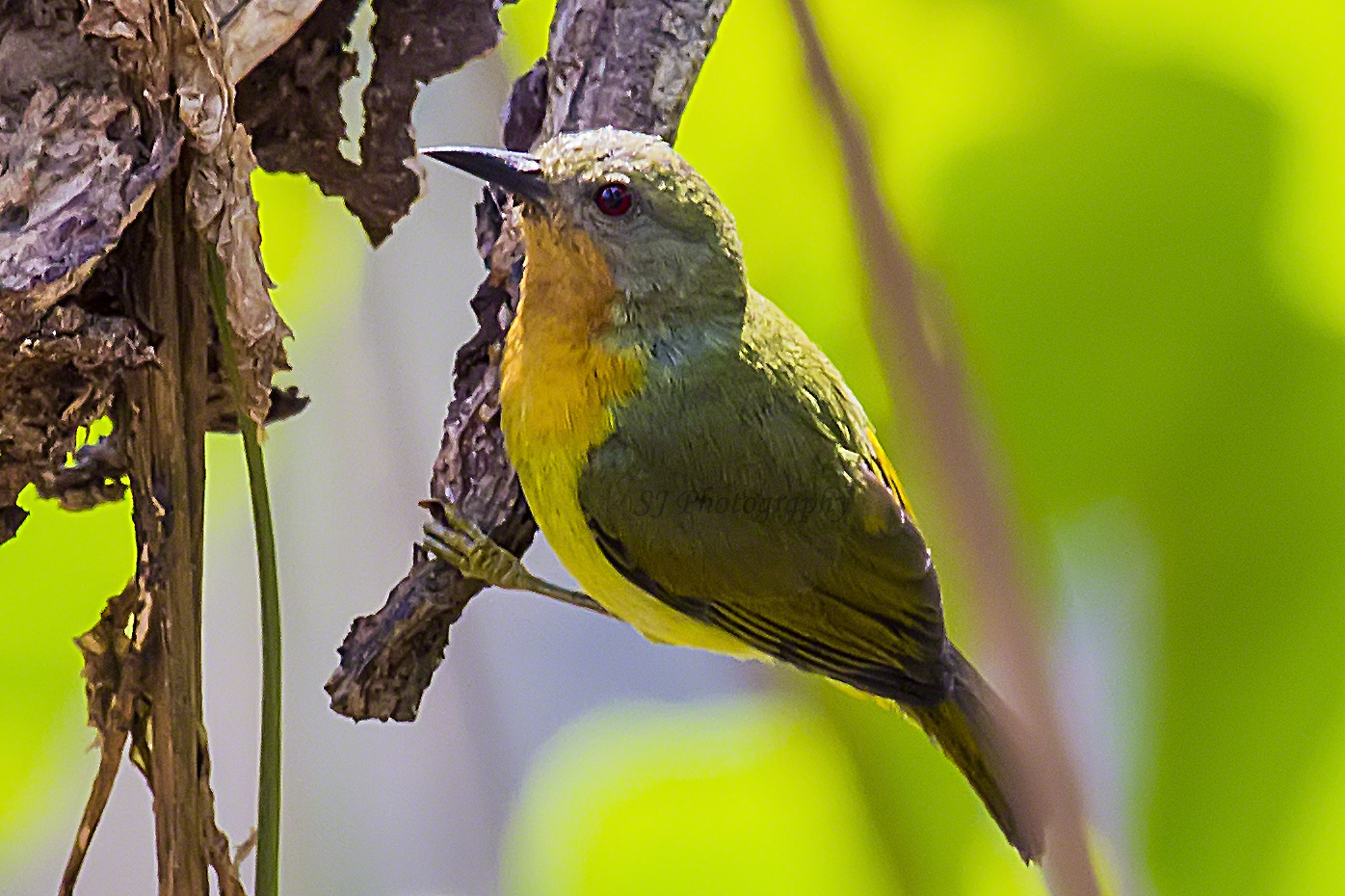
- Female

Conservation status
- Least Concern (IUCN 3.1)

Scientific classification
- Kingdom: Animalia
- Phylum: Chordata
- Class: Aves
- Order: Passeriformes
- Family: Nectariniidae
- Genus: Chalcoparia; Cabanis, 1851
- Species: C. singalensis

Binomial name
- Chalcoparia singalensis (Gmelin, JF, 1789)

= Ruby-cheeked sunbird =

Species of bird

The ruby-cheeked sunbird (Chalcoparia singalensis) is a species of sunbird in the family Nectariniidae.

== Taxonomy ==
The ruby-cheeked sunbird was formally described in 1789 by the German naturalist Johann Friedrich Gmelin in his revised and expanded edition of Carl Linnaeus's Systema Naturae. He placed it with the wagtails in the genus Motacilla and coined the binomial name Motacilla singalensis. Gmelin erroneously specified the type locality as Ceylon (now Sri Lanka) where the species does not occur. The locality was designated as Malacca on the Malay Peninsula by the American ornithologist Harry C. Oberholser in 1912. Gmelin based his account on the "green warbler" from the East Indies that had been described and illustrated in 1776 by the English naturalist Peter Brown. The ruby-cheeked sunbird is now the only species placed in the genus Chalcoparia that was introduced in 1850 by the German ornithologist Jean Cabanis. The genus name is from Ancient Greek khalkoparēos meaning "with cheeks of bronze". The specific epithet is from the erroneous type locality, Sri Lanka.

Eleven subspecies are recognised:

- C. s. assamensis Kloss, 1930 – east Himalayas and Bangladesh to south China, north Thailand and north Myanmar
- C. s. koratensis Kloss, 1918 – east Thailand and Indochina
- C. s. internota (Deignan, 1955) – south Myanmar to north Malay Peninsula
- C. s. interposita Robinson & Kloss, 1921 – central Malay Peninsula
- C. s. singalensis (Gmelin, JF, 1789) – south Malay Peninsula
- C. s. sumatrana Kloss, 1921 – Sumatra, Lingga Islands and Belitung (east of Sumatra)
- C. s. panopsia Oberholser, 1912 – islands west of Sumatra
- C. s. pallida Chasen, 1935 – Natuna Islands (northwest of Borneo)
- C. s. borneana Kloss, 1921 – Borneo
- C. s. bantenensis (Hoogerwerf, 1967) – west Java
- C. s. phoenicotis (Temminck, 1822) – central, east Java

== Distribution and habitat ==
It is found in Bangladesh, Bhutan, Brunei, Cambodia, China, India, Indonesia, Laos, Malaysia, Myanmar, Nepal, Thailand, and Vietnam. Its natural habitats are subtropical or tropical moist lowland forest, subtropical or tropical mangrove forest, and subtropical or tropical moist montane forest.
