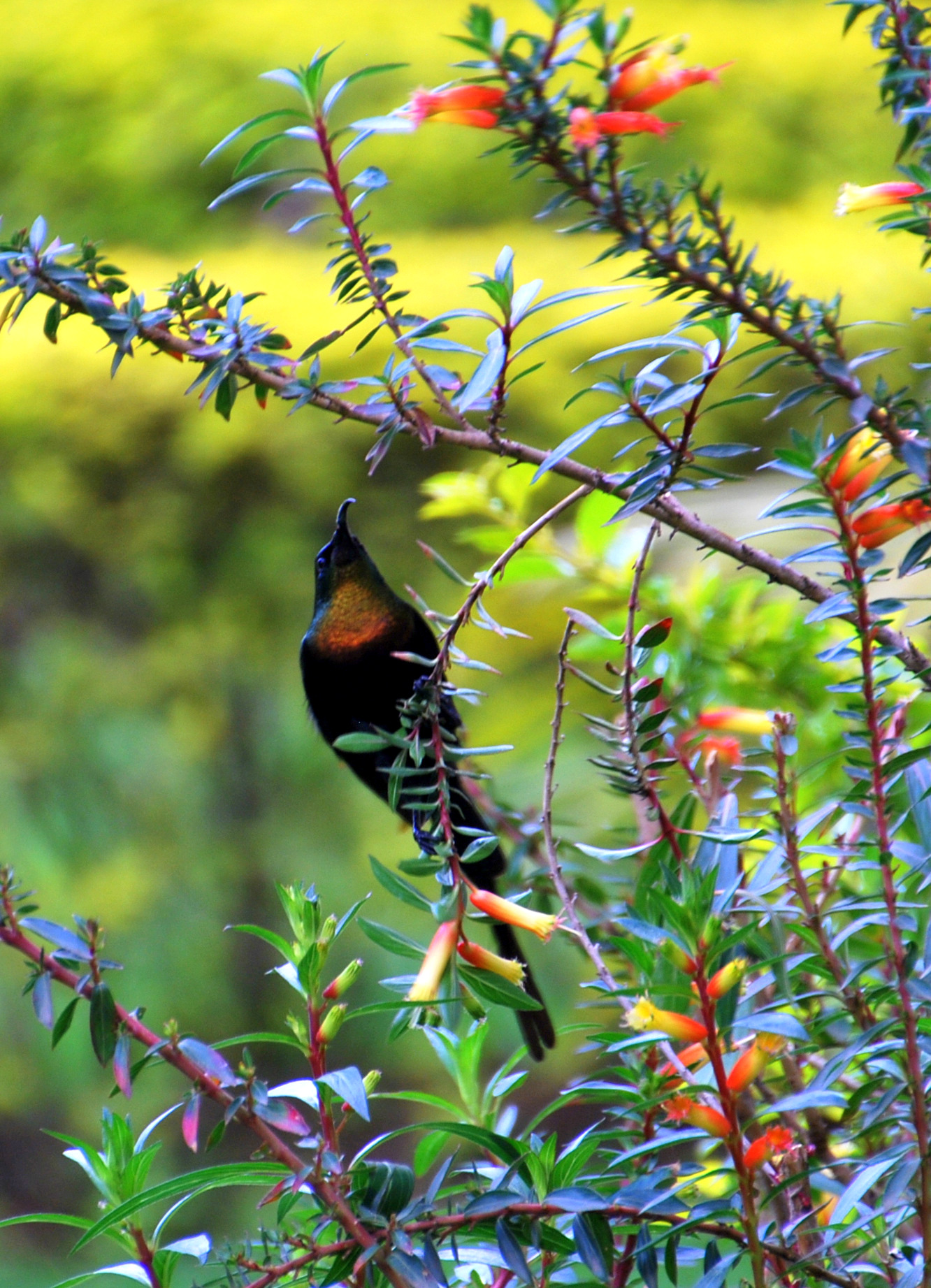

Conservation status
- Least Concern (IUCN 3.1)

Scientific classification
- Kingdom: Animalia
- Phylum: Chordata
- Class: Aves
- Order: Passeriformes
- Family: Nectariniidae
- Genus: Nectarinia
- Species: N. purpureiventris

Binomial name
- Nectarinia purpureiventris (Reichenow, 1893)

= Purple-breasted sunbird =

Species of bird

The purple-breasted sunbird (Nectarinia purpureiventris) is a species of bird in the family Nectariniidae. It is native to the Albertine Rift montane forests. It is commonly found in Nyugwe Forest.
