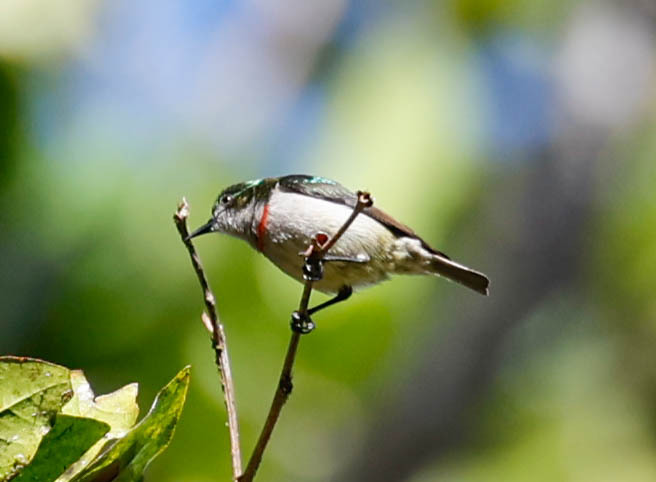

Conservation status
- Vulnerable (IUCN 3.1)

Scientific classification
- Kingdom: Animalia
- Phylum: Chordata
- Class: Aves
- Order: Passeriformes
- Family: Nectariniidae
- Genus: Anthreptes
- Species: A. rubritorques

Binomial name
- Anthreptes rubritorques Reichenow, 1905

= Banded green sunbird =

Species of bird

The banded green sunbird (Anthreptes rubritorques) is a species of bird in the family Nectariniidae. It is endemic to Tanzania.

Its natural habitats are subtropical or tropical moist lowland forest, subtropical or tropical moist montane forest, plantations, and rural gardens. It is threatened by habitat loss.
