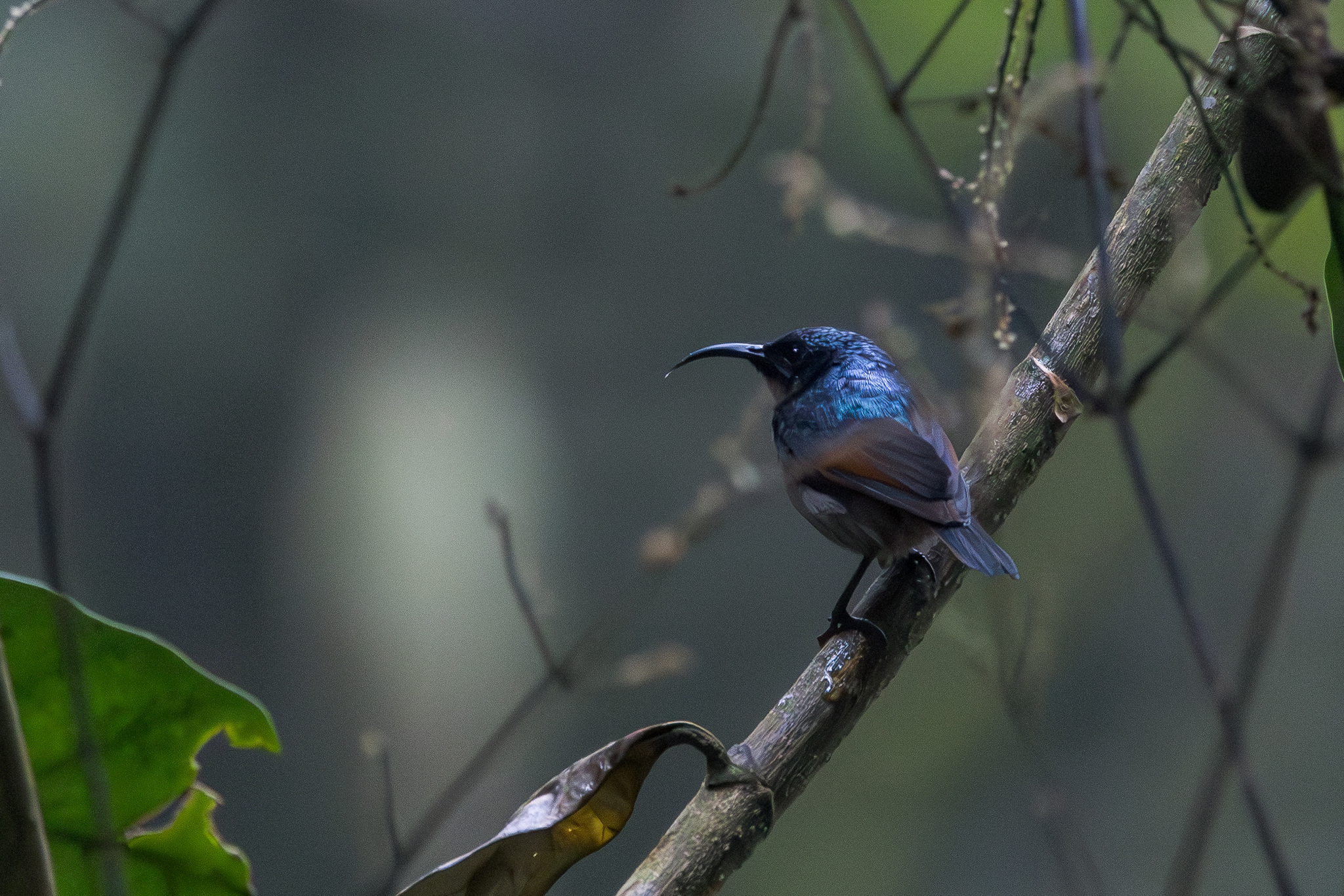

Conservation status
- Vulnerable (IUCN 3.1)

Scientific classification
- Kingdom: Animalia
- Phylum: Chordata
- Class: Aves
- Order: Passeriformes
- Family: Nectariniidae
- Genus: Cinnyris
- Species: C. rufipennis

Binomial name
- Cinnyris rufipennis (Jensen, 1983)

Synonyms
- Nectarinia rufipennis

= Rufous-winged sunbird =

Species of bird

The rufous-winged sunbird (Cinnyris rufipennis) is a species of bird in the family Nectariniidae. It is native to the Udzungwa Mountains of Tanzania.

It is threatened by habitat loss.
