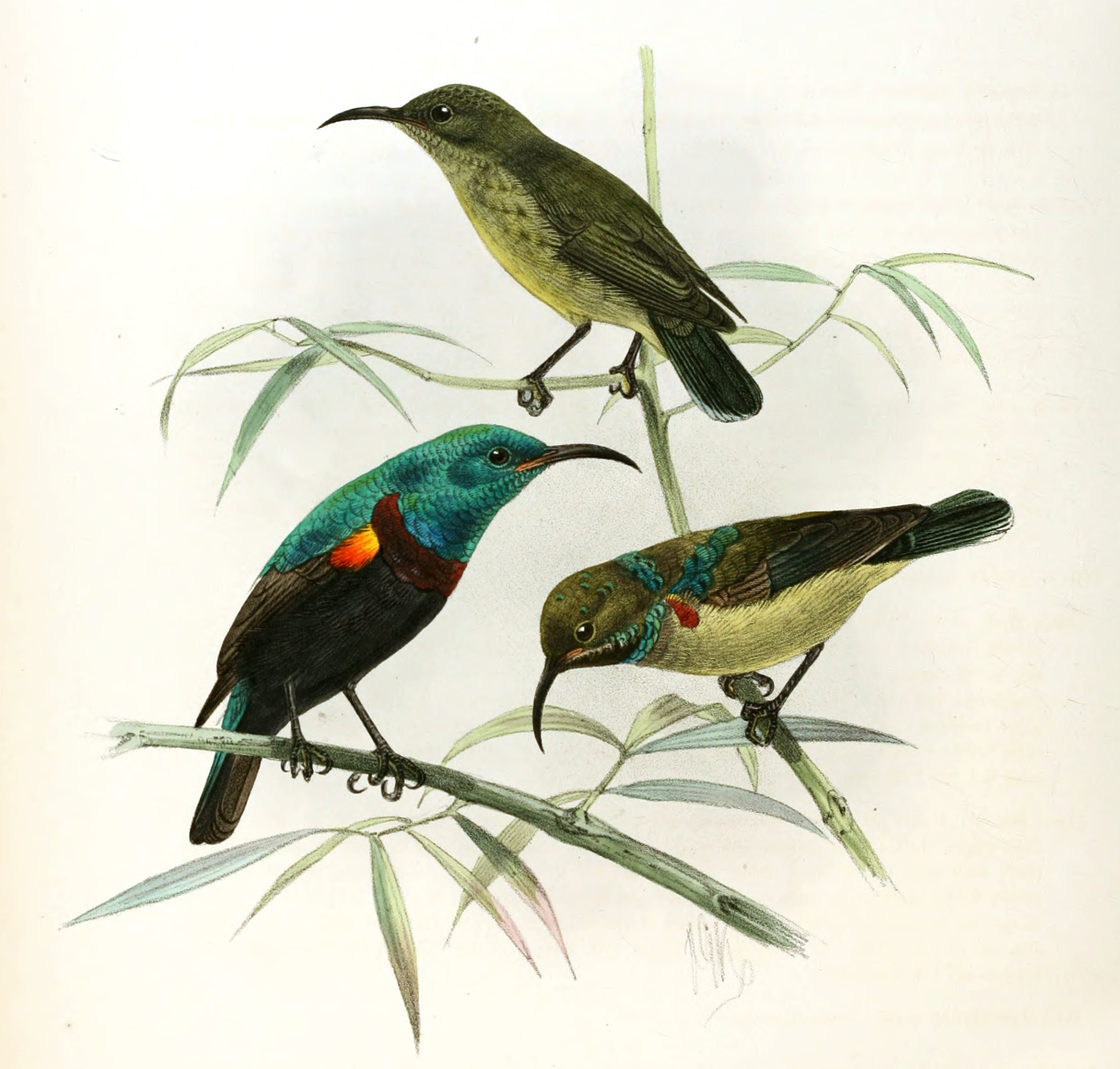

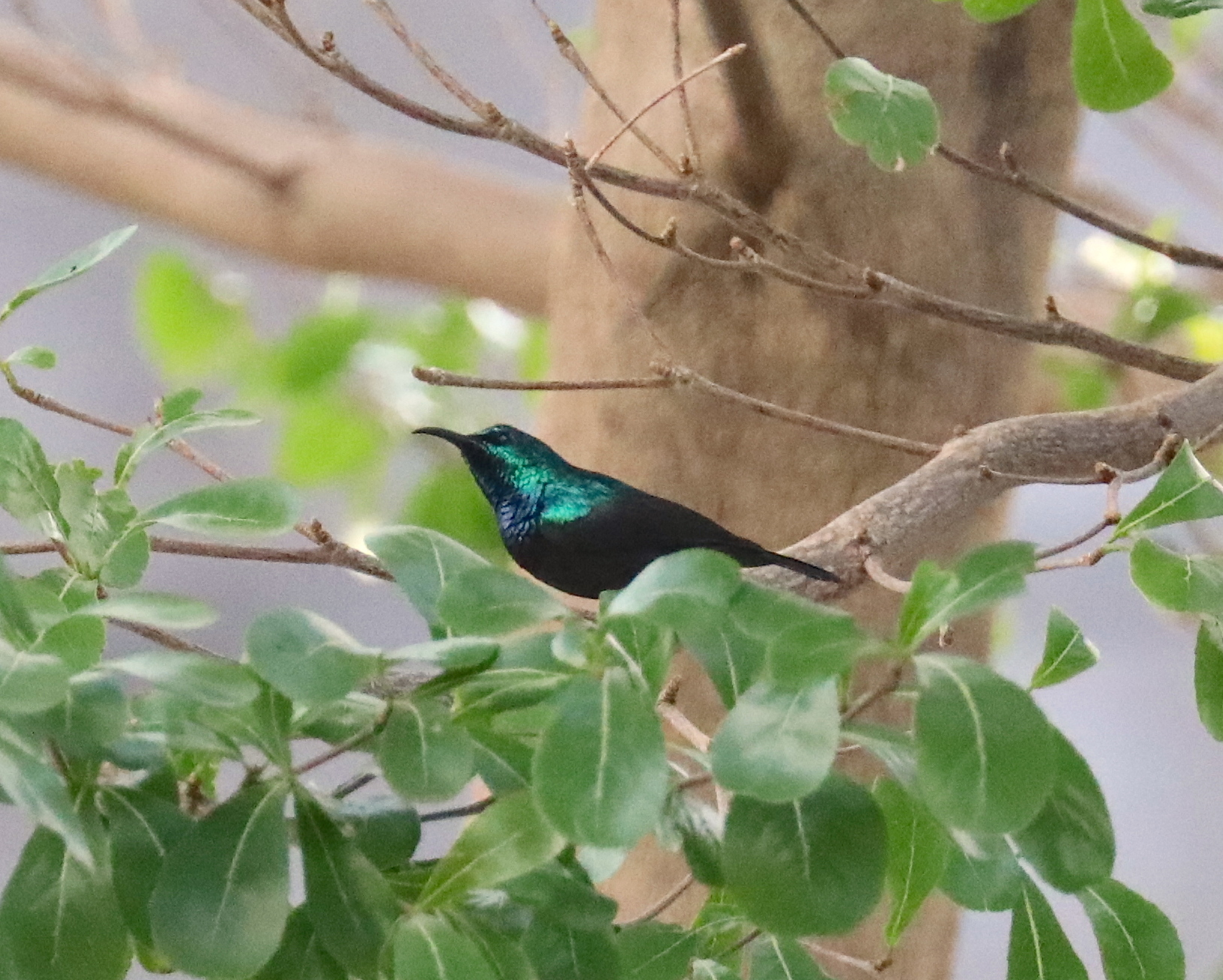

Conservation status
- Least Concern (IUCN 3.1)

Scientific classification
- Kingdom: Animalia
- Phylum: Chordata
- Class: Aves
- Order: Passeriformes
- Family: Nectariniidae
- Genus: Cinnyris
- Species: C. comorensis

Binomial name
- Cinnyris comorensis Peters, 1864

= Anjouan sunbird =

Species of bird

The Anjouan sunbird (Cinnyris comorensis) is a species of bird in the sunbird family, Nectariniidae. It is endemic to Anjouan island in the Comoros, where its natural habitats are subtropical or tropical moist lowland forests and subtropical or tropical moist montane forests. Male birds of this species are more colorful than females. The color of female bird is cloudy yellow, while male bird has 3-4 colors like black, brown, green and blue.
