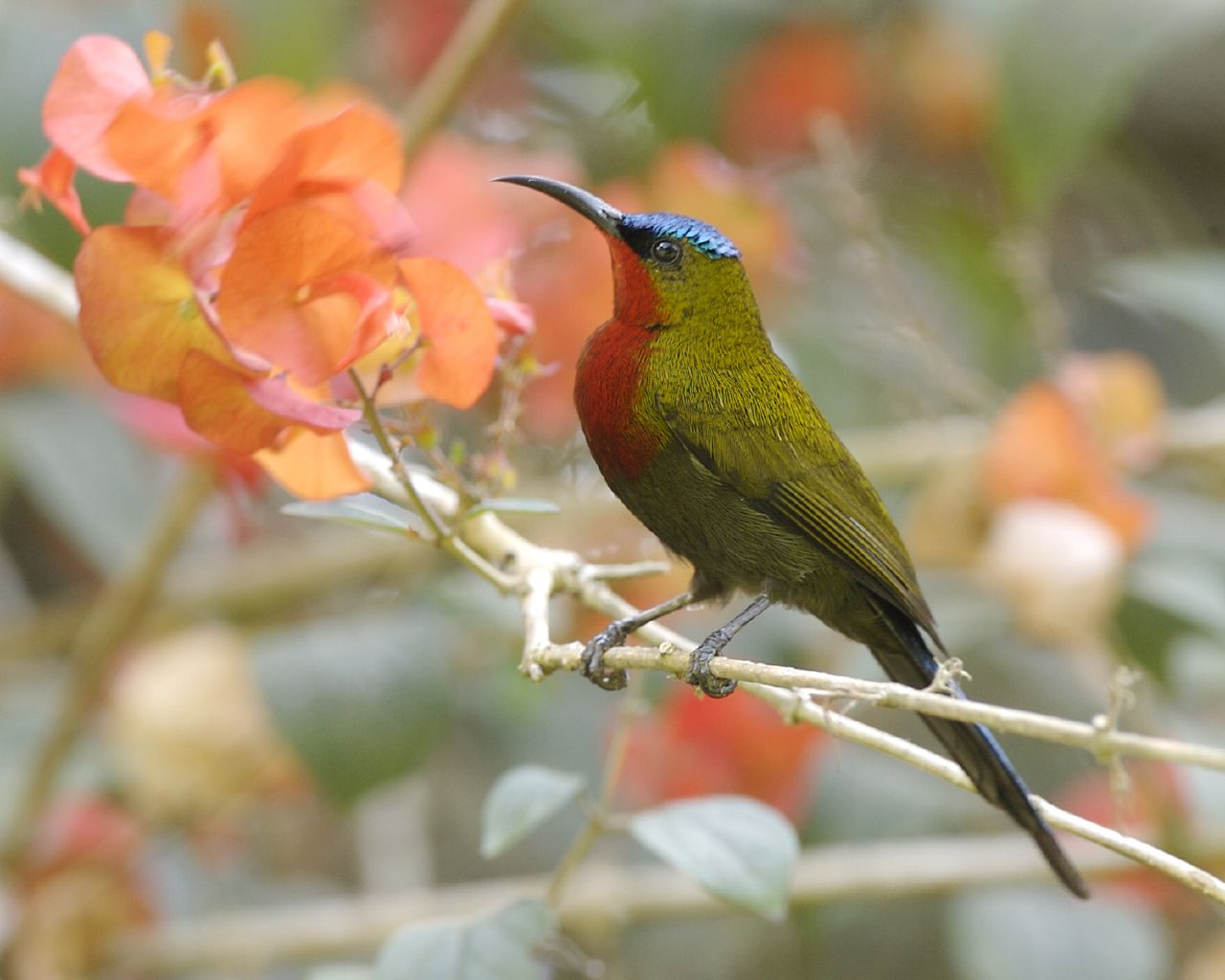
- Male
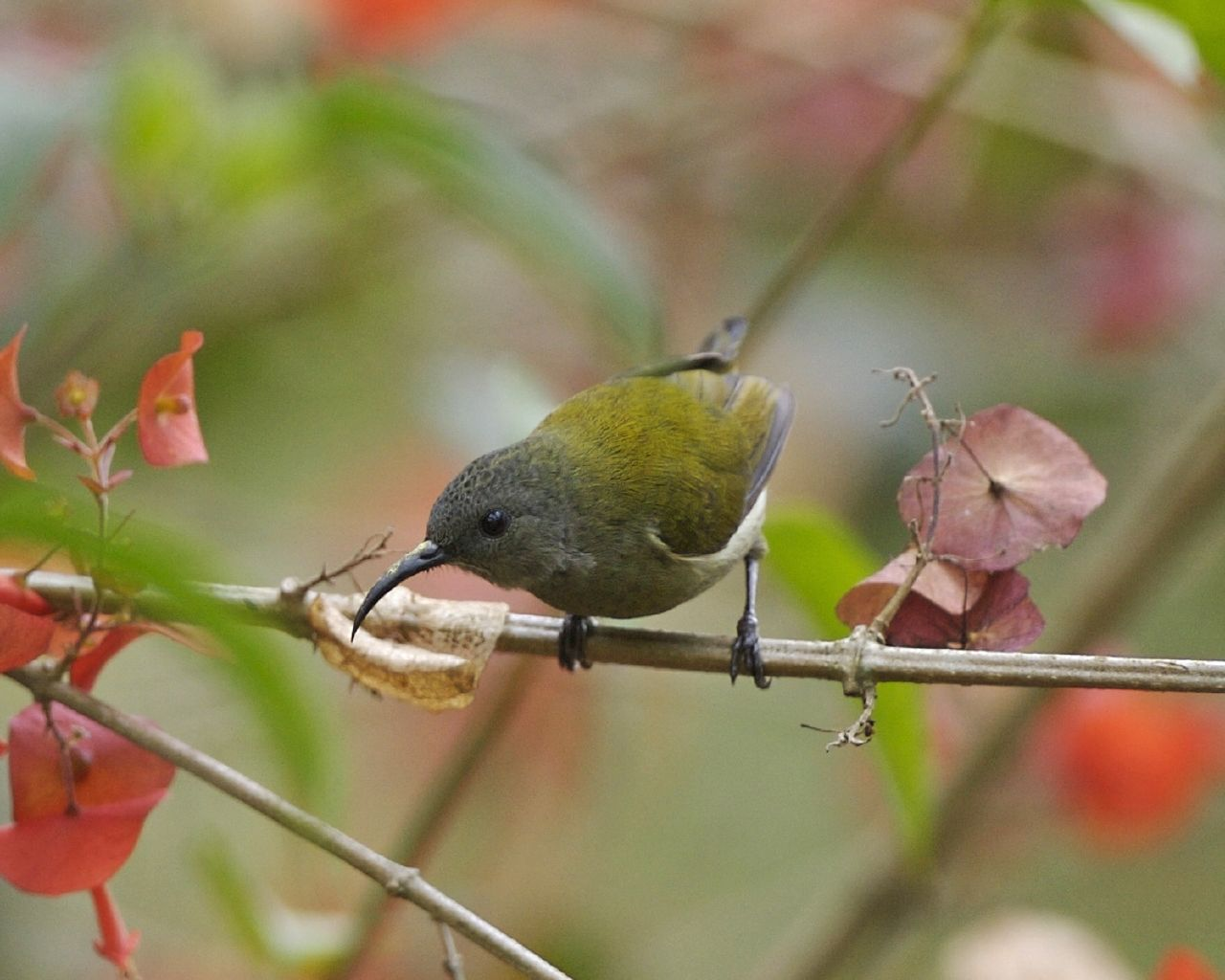
- Female

Conservation status
- Least Concern (IUCN 3.1)

Scientific classification
- Kingdom: Animalia
- Phylum: Chordata
- Class: Aves
- Order: Passeriformes
- Family: Nectariniidae
- Genus: Aethopyga
- Species: A. eximia

Binomial name
- Aethopyga eximia (Horsfield, 1821)

= White-flanked sunbird =

Species of bird

The white-flanked sunbird (Aethopyga eximia) is a species of bird in the family Nectariniidae. It is endemic to Indonesia.

== Taxonomy ==
The white-flanked sunbird was formally described by Thomas Horsfield in 1821.

== Distribution and habitat ==
Its natural habitat is subtropical or tropical moist montane forests.
