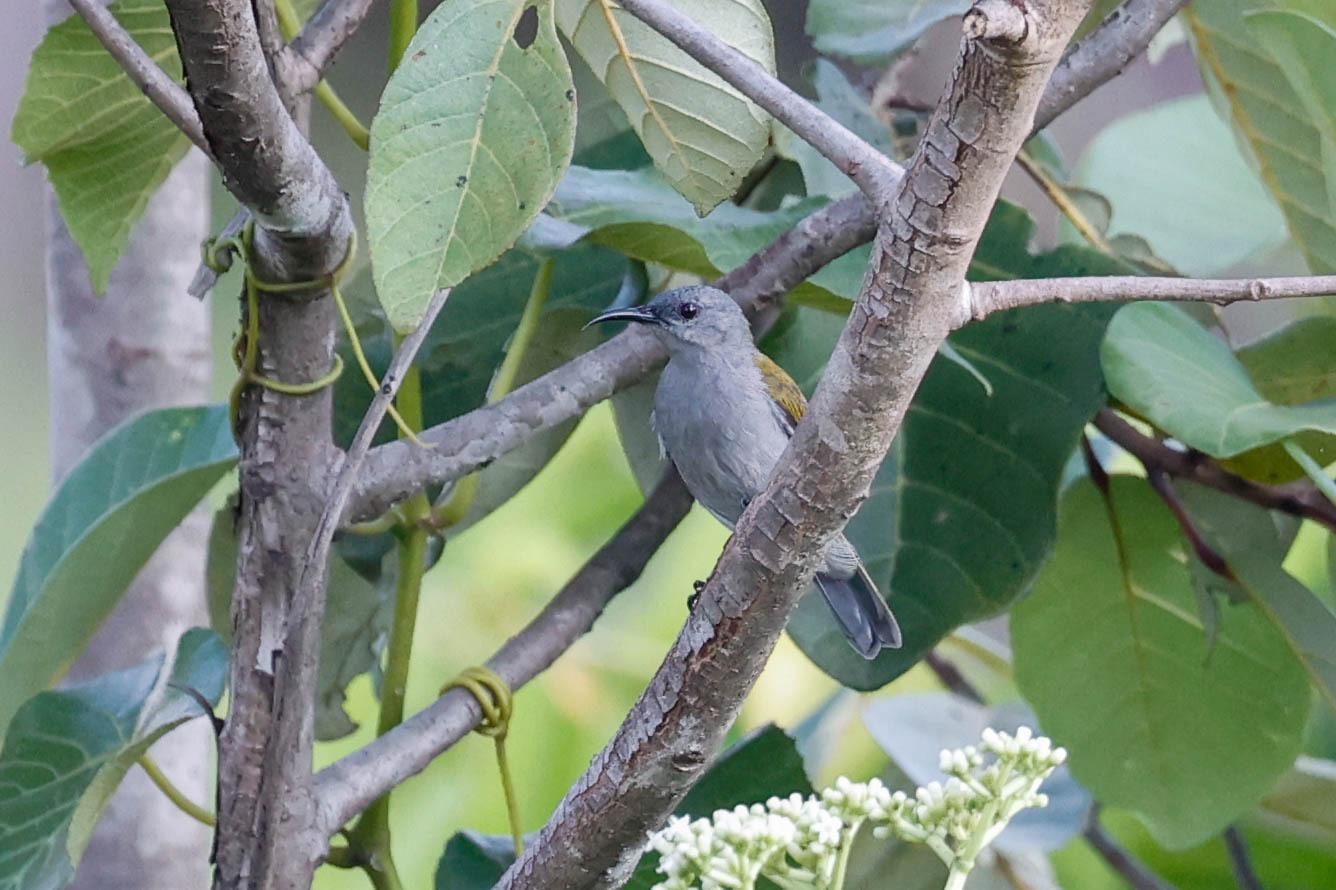

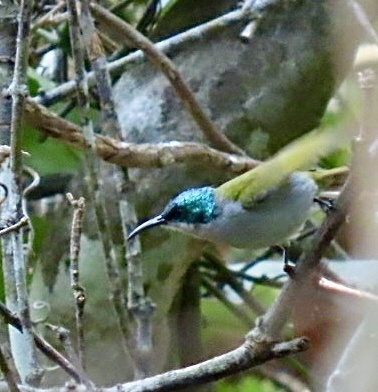

Conservation status
- Least Concern (IUCN 3.1)

Scientific classification
- Kingdom: Animalia
- Phylum: Chordata
- Class: Aves
- Order: Passeriformes
- Family: Nectariniidae
- Genus: Cyanomitra
- Species: C. bannermani

Binomial name
- Cyanomitra bannermani C. H. B. Grant & Mackworth-Praed, 1943

Synonyms
- Nectarinia bannermani

= Bannerman's sunbird =

Species of bird

Bannerman's sunbird (Cyanomitra bannermani) is a species of bird in the family Nectariniidae. It is found in Angola, Democratic Republic of the Congo, and Zambia.

Its scientific and common names honor the ornithologist David Armitage Bannerman.
