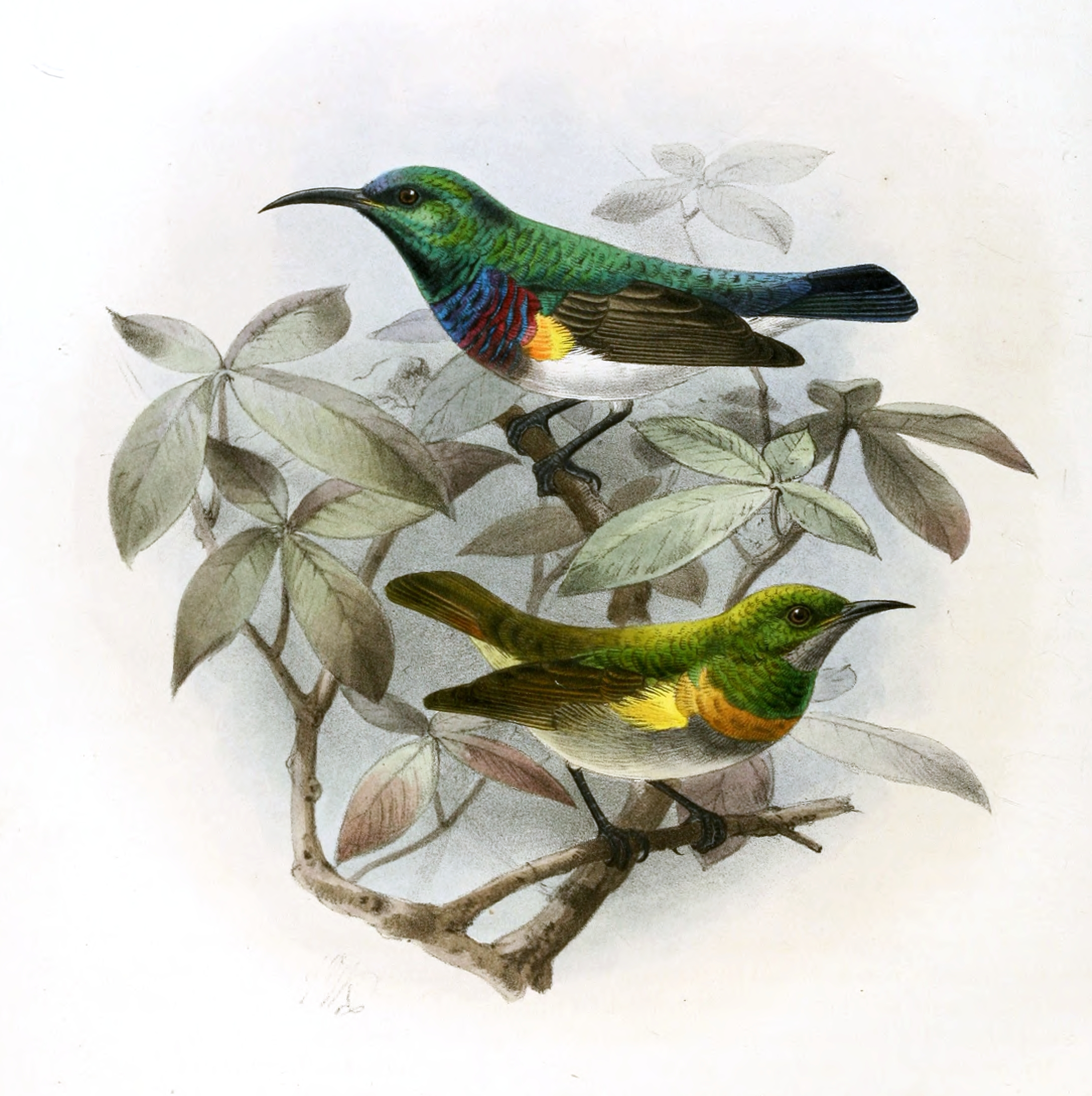
- C. oustaleti (above) with Anthreptes rectirostris
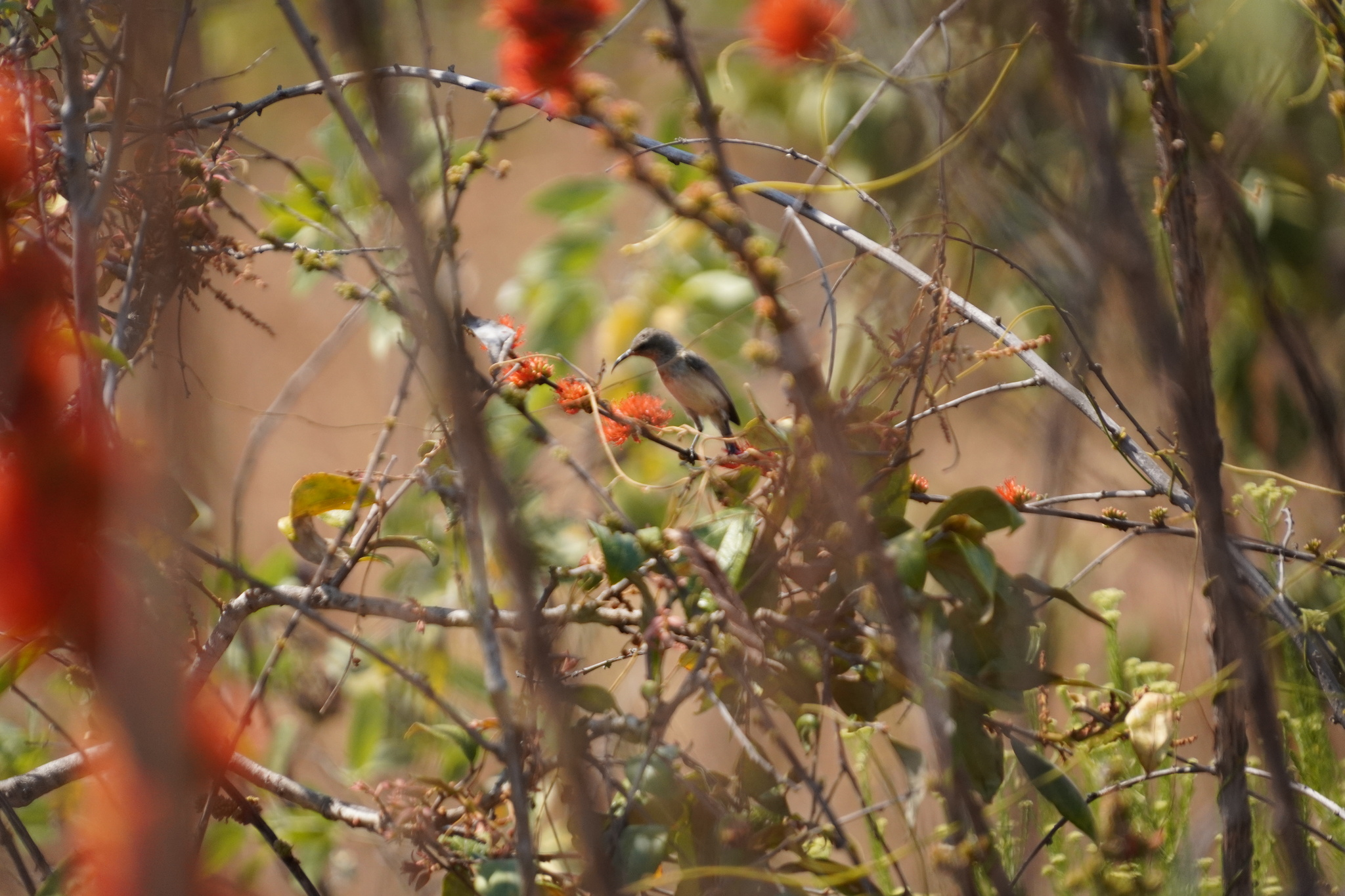

Conservation status
- Least Concern (IUCN 3.1)

Scientific classification
- Kingdom: Animalia
- Phylum: Chordata
- Class: Aves
- Order: Passeriformes
- Family: Nectariniidae
- Genus: Cinnyris
- Species: C. oustaleti

Binomial name
- Cinnyris oustaleti (Barboza du Bocage, 1878)

Synonyms
- Nectarinia oustaleti

= Oustalet's sunbird =

Species of bird

Oustalet's sunbird (Cinnyris oustaleti) is a species of bird in the family Nectariniidae. It is found in Angola, Malawi, Tanzania, and Zambia.

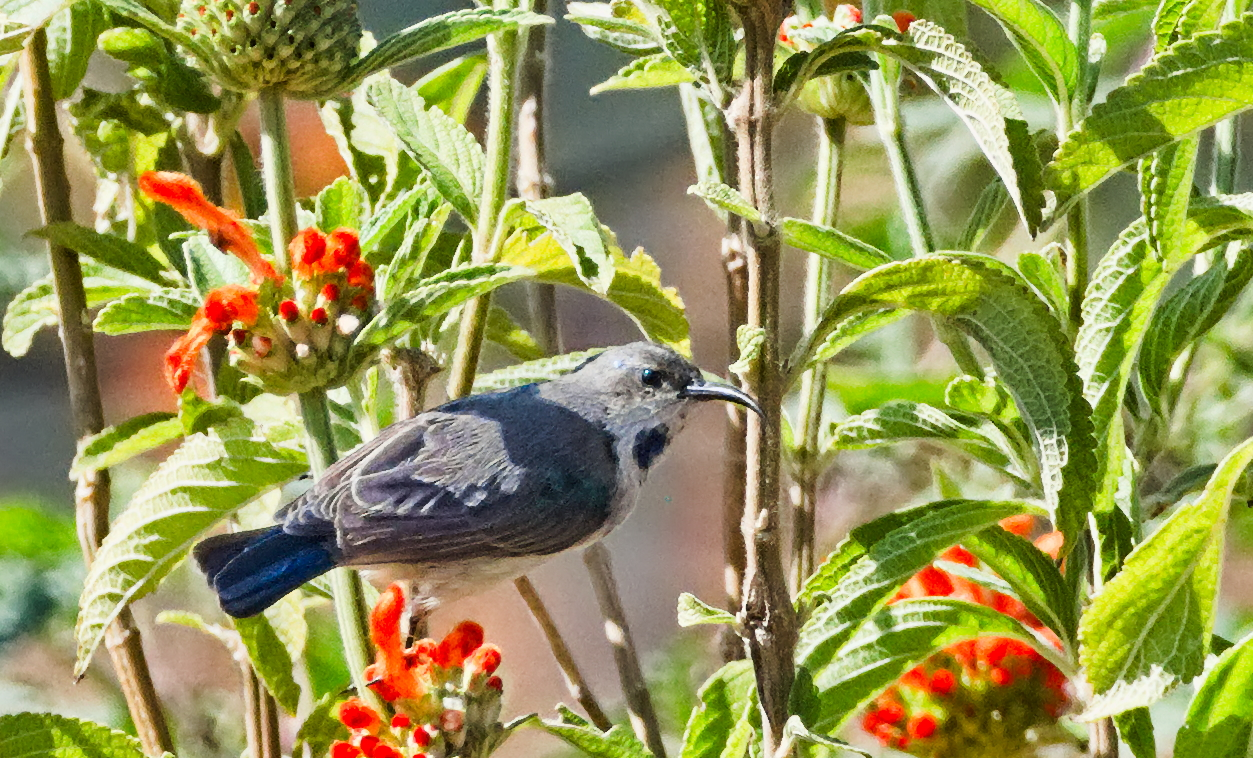
Oustalet's sunbird
