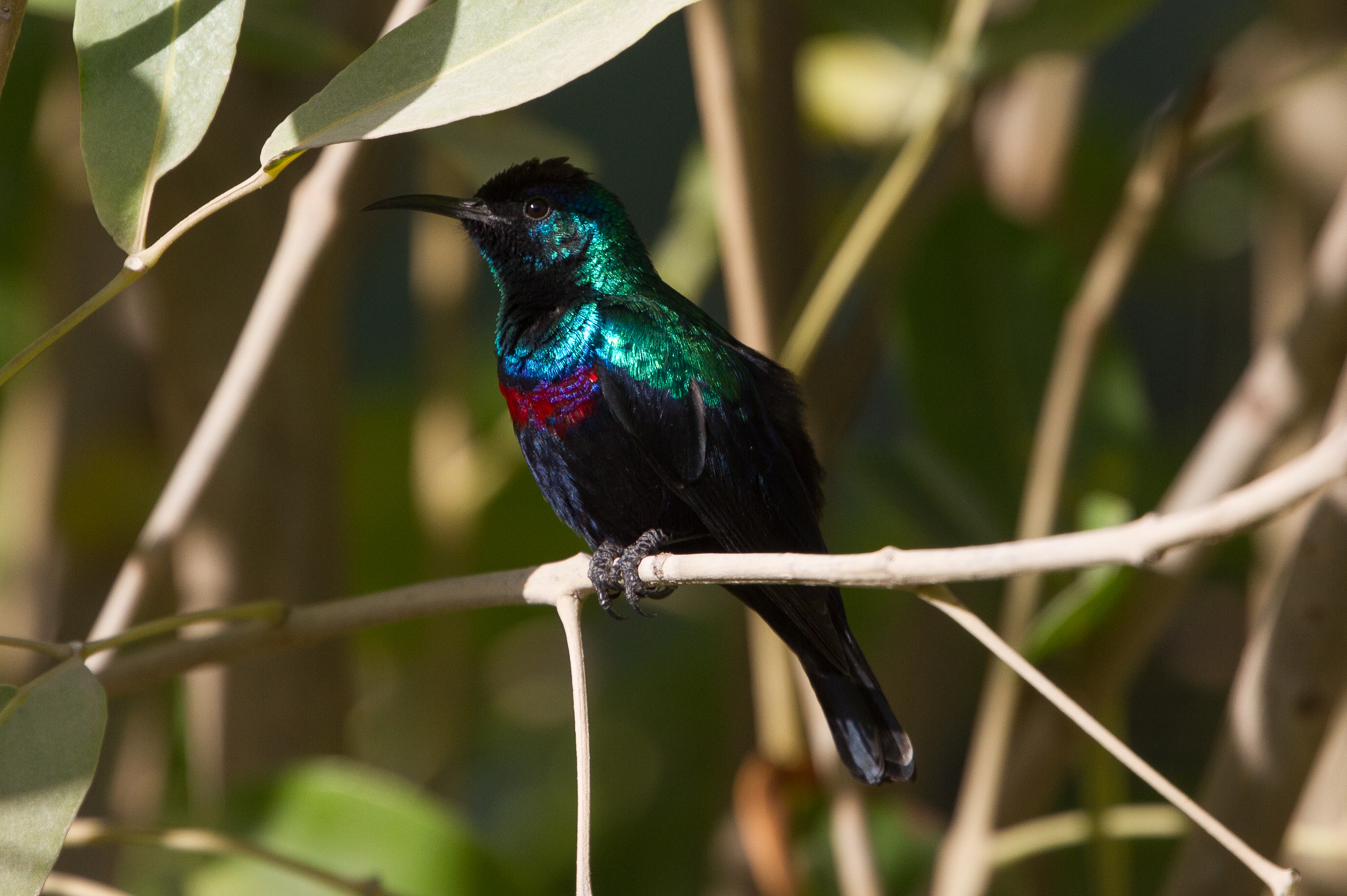

Conservation status
- Least Concern (IUCN 3.1)

Scientific classification
- Kingdom: Animalia
- Phylum: Chordata
- Class: Aves
- Order: Passeriformes
- Family: Nectariniidae
- Genus: Cinnyris
- Species: C. hellmayri

Binomial name
- Cinnyris hellmayri Neumann, 1904

= Arabian sunbird =

Species of bird

The Arabian sunbird (Cinnyris hellmayri) is a species of bird in the family Nectariniidae.

== Subspecies ==
- Cinnyris hellmayri hellmayri Neumann
- Cinnyris hellmayri kinneari Bates

== Distribution ==
It is native to the Southwestern Arabian foothills savanna.

== Habitat ==
This species prefers rocky or sandy areas and dry river beds with Acacia and Ziziphus trees.
