= Whyte's double-collared sunbird =

Scientific classification
- Domain: Eukaryota
- Kingdom: Animalia
- Phylum: Chordata
- Class: Aves
- Order: Passeriformes
- Family: Nectariniidae
- Genus: Cinnyris
- Species: C. whytei

Binomial name
- Cinnyris whytei Benson, 1948

Synonyms
- Cinnyris ludovicensis whytei

Species of bird

Whyte's double-collared sunbird (Cinnyris whytei) is a species of bird in the family Nectariniidae. It was considered a subspecies of Ludwig's double-collared sunbird. It is found in Zambia, Malawi, and Tanzania. Its natural habitat is subtropical or tropical dry forests. It is threatened by habitat loss.

== Taxonomy ==
- C. reichenowi
- - - - - - C. whytei whytei
          - C. whytei skye
        - C. stuhlmanni
      - - C. afer
        - C. manoensis
  - - - C. chalybeus
      - - C. regius
        - - - C. fuellerborni
            - - C. moreaui
              - C. loveridgei
          - - C. mediocris
            - C. usambaricus
    - C. ludovicensis

Relationships between the African Cinnyris based on Bowie et al. (2016)

In 1948 C.W. Benson described the subspecies C. afer whytei collected in the highlands of Nyassaland (Malawi). He named it after Mr Alexander Whyte who collected the first two specimens of the species in 1896. After reorganizations of this confusing complex of species it was later placed as a subspecies of Cinnyris ludovicensis and still later treated as a full species. In the Eastern Arc Mountains in Tanzania a new subspecies (C. w. skye) was observed in 2000. Thereafter extensive research followed including molecular phylogenetic studies on the complex of African double collared sunbird taxa. The sunbirds found in the highlands of Zambia, Malawi and Tanzania appeared to constitute a clade which strongly differed from Ludwig's double-collared sunbird, C. ludovicensis. Therefore, C. whytei has been split from C. ludovicensis.

There are two subspecies:

- C. w. whytei in Zambia and Malawi
- C. w. skye in the Eastern Arc Mountains in Tanzania.
