= Prigogine's double-collared sunbird =

Conservation status
- Near Threatened (IUCN 3.1)

Scientific classification
- Kingdom: Animalia
- Phylum: Chordata
- Class: Aves
- Order: Passeriformes
- Family: Nectariniidae
- Genus: Cinnyris
- Species: C. prigoginei

Binomial name
- Cinnyris prigoginei MacDonald, 1958

Synonyms
- Cinnyris afer prigoginei; Nectarinia prigoginei

Species of bird

Prigogine's sunbird or Prigogine's double-collared sunbird (Cinnyris prigoginei) is a species of bird in the family Nectariniidae.

== Taxonomy ==
It is sometimes considered a subspecies of the greater double-collared sunbird (Cinnyris afer). Alternatively, it has been considered related to other members of the greater double-collared sunbird species complex, including Stuhlmann's sunbird (Cinnyris stuhlmanni) and montane double-collared sunbird (Cinnyris ludovicensis), but it is now regarded as a full species. At 35 characters including spaces, it has the longest English common name of any bird.

== Distribution and habitat ==
It is endemic to the Marungu highlands of Tanganyika Province, southeastern Democratic Republic of the Congo. Its natural habitat is montane forest.

== Conservation ==
It is threatened by habitat loss.
