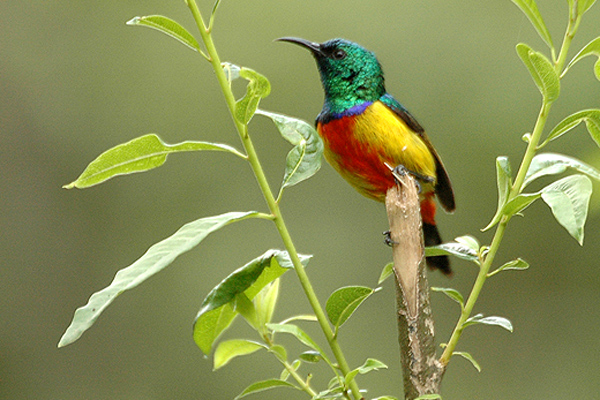
- male
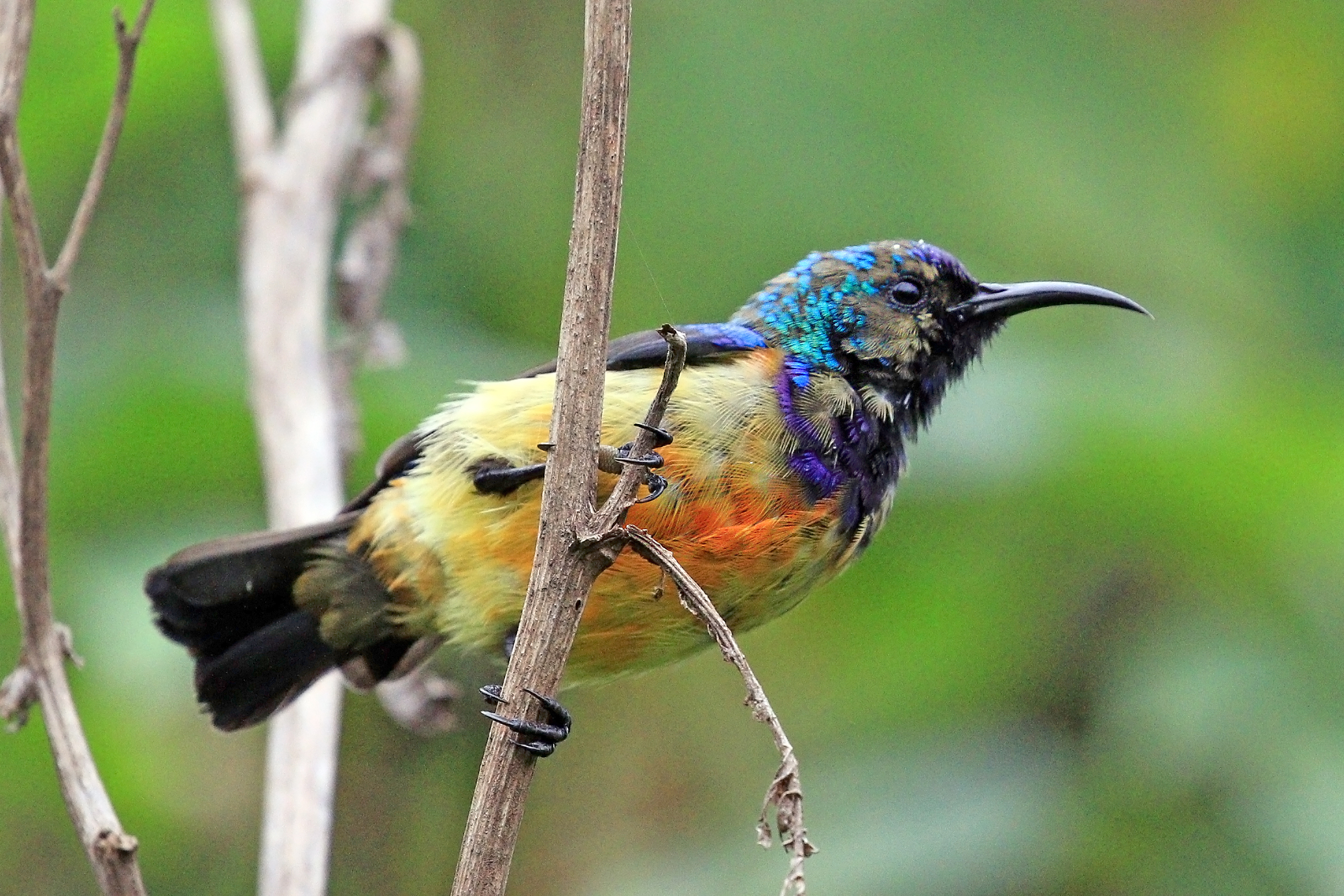
- male C. r. regius moulting Volcanoes National Park; Rwanda

Conservation status
- Least Concern (IUCN 3.1)

Scientific classification
- Kingdom: Animalia
- Phylum: Chordata
- Class: Aves
- Order: Passeriformes
- Family: Nectariniidae
- Genus: Cinnyris
- Species: C. regius

Binomial name
- Cinnyris regius Reichenow, 1893

Synonyms
- Nectarinia regia

= Regal sunbird =

Species of bird

The regal sunbird (Cinnyris regius) is a species of bird in the family Nectariniidae. It is native to the Albertine Rift montane forests.

== Description ==
The regal sunbird is a small species. The adult male has head and upper parts an iridescent golden-green, dark wings and tail and a boldly-marked red and yellow breast and belly. The adult female has dull olive upper parts, with yellowish, faintly streaked underparts. The male is distinctive, but the female could be confused with the female Rockefeller's sunbird (Cinnyris rockefelleri), though this has a paler throat. The female Rwenzori double-collared sunbird (Cinnyris stuhlmanni) and the female northern double-collared sunbird (Cinnyris reichenowi) are also similar, but these have greener upper parts and yellower underparts; another similar species is the variable sunbird (Cinnyris venustus), but the regal can be recognised by the upper parts being more olive and the underparts a more uniform yellowish-olive.

== Distribution and habitat ==
The regal sunbird's range spans the entire Albertine Rift montane forests (from Uganda to Tanzania), where it occurs between 1,500 and 3,100 m (4,900 and 10,200 ft) above sea level. Its habitat includes evergreen mountain forest, mixed forest, secondary growth forest, scrubland and bamboo.

== Status ==
The regal sunbird is a common species with a very wide range. The population trend is thought to be declining because of loss of the forest habitat. However, no particular threats have been identified and the International Union for Conservation of Nature has assessed the bird's conservation status as being of "least concern".
