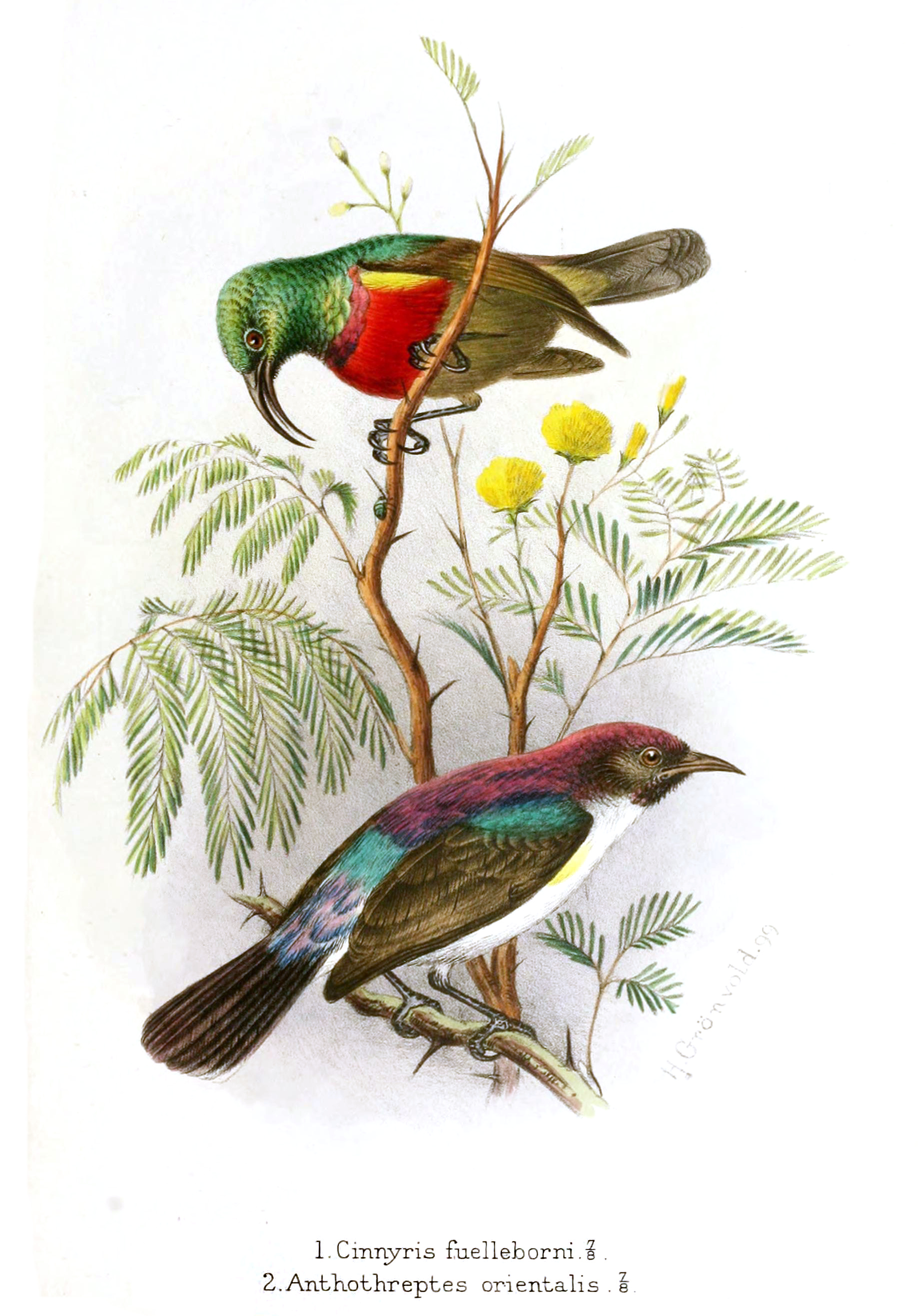
- Forest double-collared sunbird on top
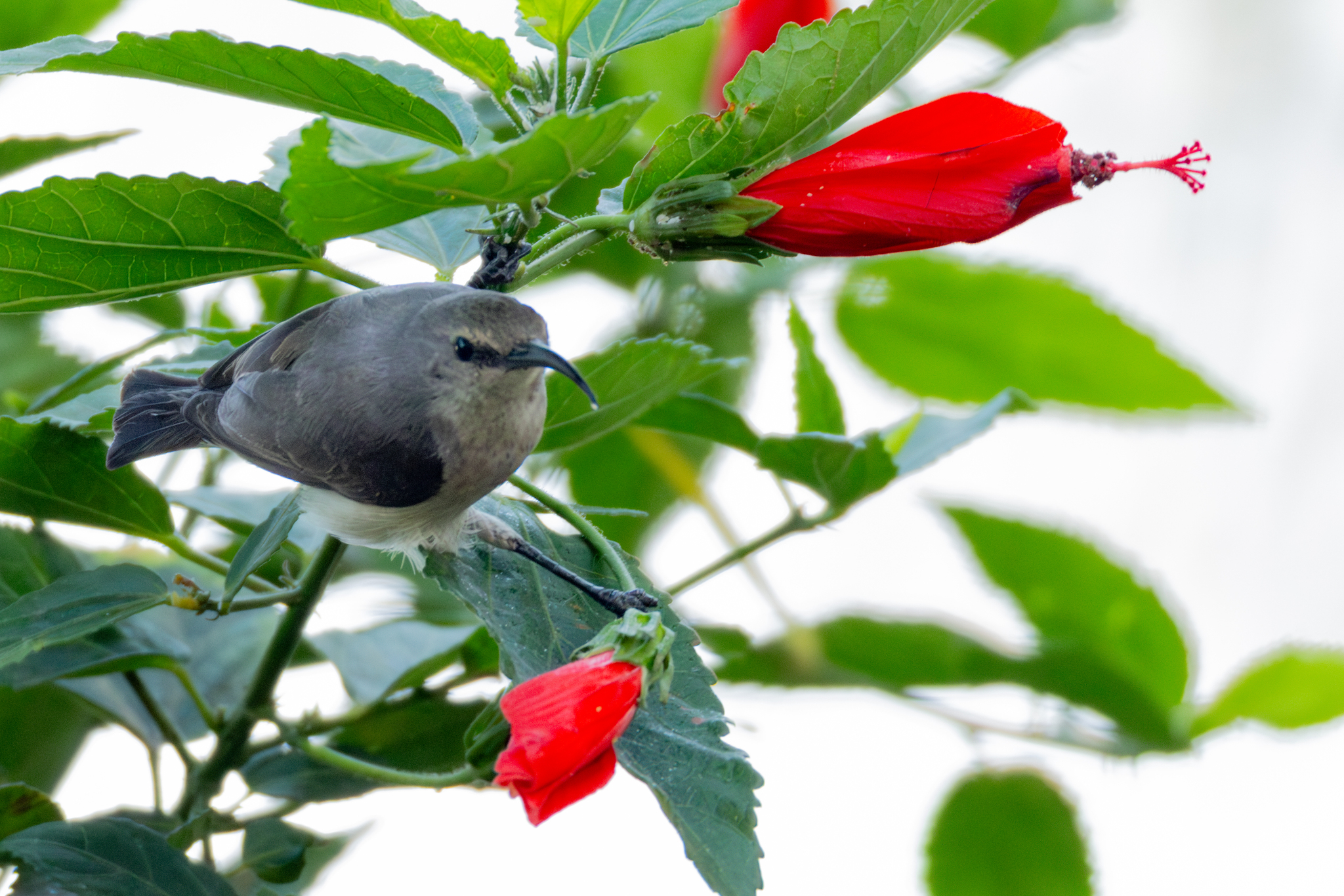
- Female

Conservation status
- Least Concern (IUCN 3.1)

Scientific classification
- Kingdom: Animalia
- Phylum: Chordata
- Class: Aves
- Order: Passeriformes
- Family: Nectariniidae
- Genus: Cinnyris
- Species: C. fuelleborni

Binomial name
- Cinnyris fuelleborni Reichenow, 1899

Synonyms
- Nectarinia fuelleborni (Reichenow, 1899)

= Forest double-collared sunbird =

Species of bird

The forest double-collared sunbird (Cinnyris fuelleborni) is a species of bird in the family Nectariniidae. It is a resident breeder of tropical moist montane forests in parts of East Africa.

== Taxonomy ==
The forest double-collared sunbird was described by the German ornithologist Anton Reichenow in 1899 and given the binomial name Cinnyris fülleborni. He specified the type location as Kalinga in the Iringa Region of Tanzania. The specific name was chosen to honour the German physician and naturalist Friedrich Fülleborn.

This species was formerly considered as a subspecies of the eastern double-collared sunbird (Cinnyris mediocris) but was promoted to species status based on differences in plumage and genetics.
