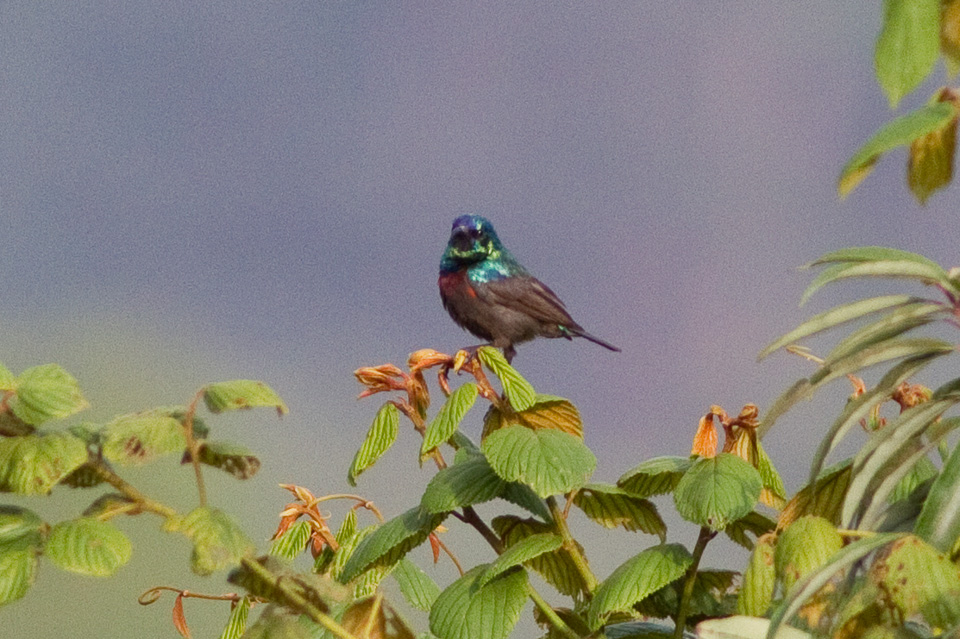

Conservation status
- Least Concern (IUCN 3.1)

Scientific classification
- Kingdom: Animalia
- Phylum: Chordata
- Class: Aves
- Order: Passeriformes
- Family: Nectariniidae
- Genus: Cinnyris
- Species: C. bouvieri

Binomial name
- Cinnyris bouvieri Shelley, 1877

Synonyms
- Nectarinia bouvieri

= Orange-tufted sunbird =

Species of bird

The orange-tufted sunbird (Cinnyris bouvieri) is a species of bird in the family Nectariniidae. It is found in moist savanna, the grassy edges of gallery forest and of isolated tropical forests in Africa. It is absent from forests in the central Congo Basin. It has been recorded in northern Angola, Cameroon, Central African Republic, Republic of the Congo, Democratic Republic of the Congo, Equatorial Guinea, Gabon, western Kenya, eastern Nigeria, Uganda, and northern Zambia.
