= Congo sunbird =

Conservation status
- Least Concern (IUCN 3.1)

Scientific classification
- Kingdom: Animalia
- Phylum: Chordata
- Class: Aves
- Order: Passeriformes
- Family: Nectariniidae
- Genus: Cinnyris
- Species: C. congensis

Binomial name
- Cinnyris congensis (van Oort, 1910)

Synonyms
- Nectarinia congensis

Species of bird

The Congo sunbird (Cinnyris congensis) is a species of bird in the family Nectariniidae. It is found in Republic of the Congo and Democratic Republic of the Congo.

== Taxonomy ==
Monotypic. Formerly considered part of the genus Nectarinia, along with other members of the genus Cinnyris.

== Distribution and habitat ==
Known from the Republic of Congo and the Democratic Republic of the Congo, where it occurs in riverine forests along the banks of the middle Congo River and its tributaries.
