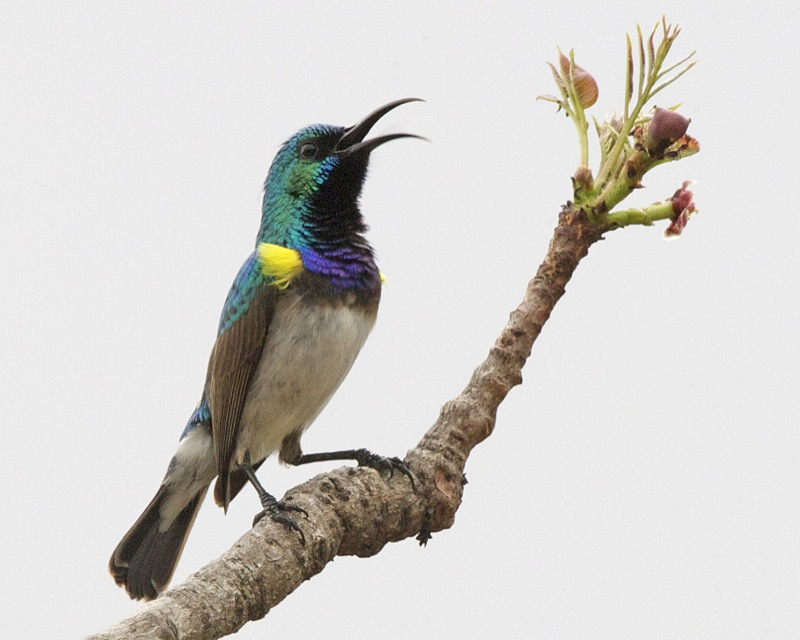
- Male bird singing

Conservation status
- Least Concern (IUCN 3.1)

Scientific classification
- Kingdom: Animalia
- Phylum: Chordata
- Class: Aves
- Order: Passeriformes
- Family: Nectariniidae
- Genus: Cinnyris
- Species: C. talatala

Binomial name
- Cinnyris talatala Smith, 1836

Synonyms
- Nectarinia talatala

= White-bellied sunbird =

Species of bird

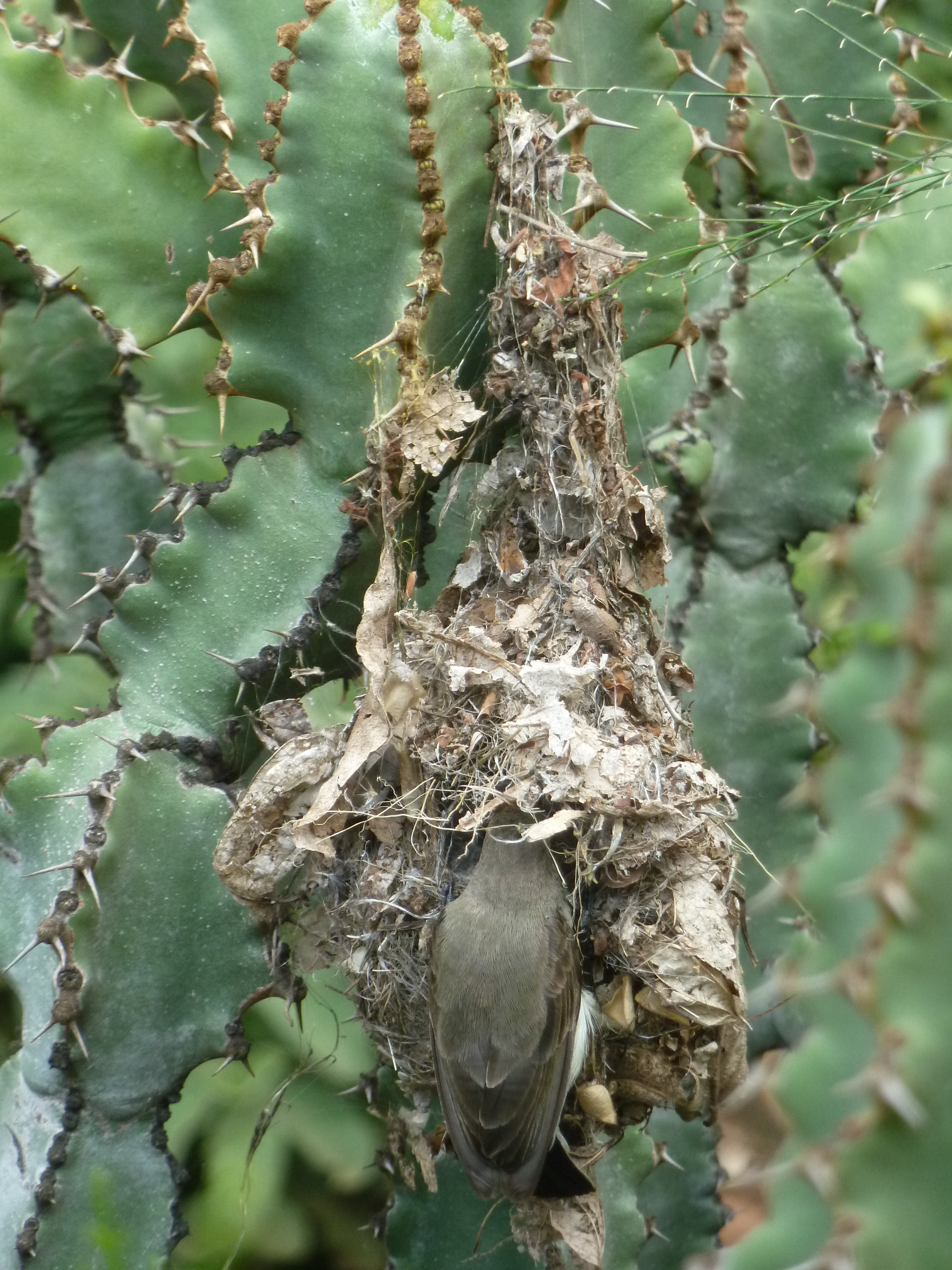
Female at nest entrance

Female calling in a botanical garden

The white-bellied sunbird (Cinnyris talatala), also known as the white-breasted sunbird, is a species of bird in the family Nectariniidae. It is found in Angola, Botswana, Democratic Republic of the Congo, Eswatini, Malawi, Mozambique, Namibia, South Africa, Tanzania, Zambia, and Zimbabwe.

== Distribution and habitat ==
Occurs from Angola to southern Tanzania south to southern Africa, where it is common to locally abundant across northern Namibia, northern and south-eastern Botswana, Zimbabwe, Mozambique, Eswatini and north-eastern South Africa. It generally prefers semi-arid savanna woodland, such as Acacia, bushwillow (Combretum) and riparian thickets, Zambezi teak (Baikiaea plurijuga) and mixed miombo (Brachystegia) woodland.

== Diet ==
It mainly eats nectar supplemented with arthropods, often joining mixed-species foraging flocks in the day, along with other sunbirds at large sources of nectar. In the late afternoon it regularly hawks insects aerially and gleans invertebrates from foliage.

The following food items have been recorded in its diet:

=== * Nectar ===
- Leonotis (wild dagga)
- Tecoma capensis (Cape honeysuckle)
- Combretum mossambicense (Knobbly climbing bushwillow)
- Combretum paniculatum (Forest burning-bush combretum)
- Thunbergia grandiflora (Blue skyflower)
- Aloe
- A. arborescens (Krantz aloe)
- A. cameronii (Ruwari aloe)
- A. chabaudii (Chabaudi's aloe)
- Dalbergia nitidula (Purplewood flat-bean)
- Hibiscus
- Erythrina (coral-trees)
- Cordyla africana (Wild mango)
- Schotia (Boer-beans)
- Strelitzia
- Salvia
- Bauhinia
- Protea
- Kigelia africana (Sausage-tree)
- Watsonia
- Kniphofia (torch lilies)
- Agapanthus
- Grewia (raisins)
- Loranthaceae (mistletoes)
- alien plants
- Brunsfelia
- Canna
- Callistemon viminalis (Weeping bottlebrush)
- Cestrum (inkberries)
- Eucalyptus
- Jacaranda mimosifolia (Jacaranda)
- Ipomaea lobata (morning glory)
- Euphorbia pulcherrima (Poinsettias)
- Tecoma (South American species)
- Tithonia rotundifolia (Red sunflower)

* Arthropods

- insects
- aphids
- ants
- grasshoppers (Orthoptera)
- moths (Lepidoptera)
- spiders

== Breeding ==
The nest (see image) is built solely by the female in about 5–8 days, consisting of an untidy oval-shaped structure made of dry material such as grass and leaves, bound together with spider web. The outside is decorated with bits of leaves and bark, while the interior is thickly lined with plant down, sometimes along with feathers and wool. It is typically attached to the branches or thorns of a plant, such as a queen-of-the-night cactus (Cereus jamacaru), prickly-pear cactus (Opuntia) or a tree, sometimes alongside active paper wasp (Belanogaster) nests. Egg-laying season is from June–March, peaking from September–December. It lays 1-3 eggs, which are incubated solely by the female for 13–14 days. The chicks are brooded solely by the female but fed by both parents, leaving the nest after about 14–15 days, after which they continue to roost at the nest for about 4-14 more days.

== Threats ==
Not threatened, in fact it seems to have benefited from the fragmentation and disturbance of miombo (Brachystegia) woodland in Zimbabwe.

=== Predators and parasites ===
It has been recorded as prey of the following mammals: Felis catus (Domestic cat) Galerella sanguinea (Slender mongoose)

=== Brood parasites ===
It has been recorded as host of the Klaas's cuckoo.
