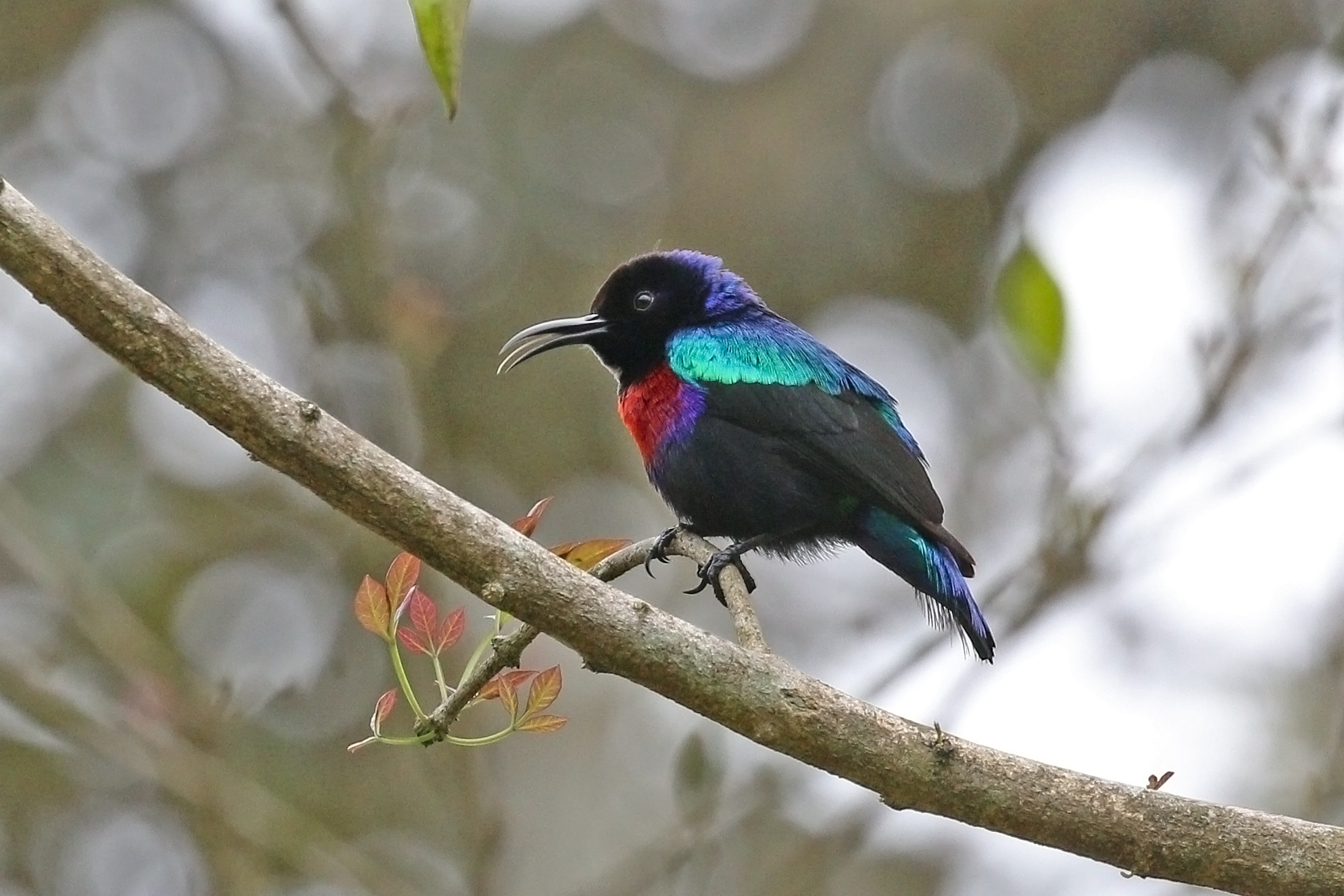
- Male splendid sunbird, C. coccinigastrus

Scientific classification
- Kingdom: Animalia
- Phylum: Chordata
- Class: Aves
- Order: Passeriformes
- Family: Nectariniidae
- Genus: Cinnyris; Cuvier, 1816

Type species
- Certhia spendida = Certhia coccinigaster Shaw, 1811

Species
- See text

= Cinnyris =

Genus of birds

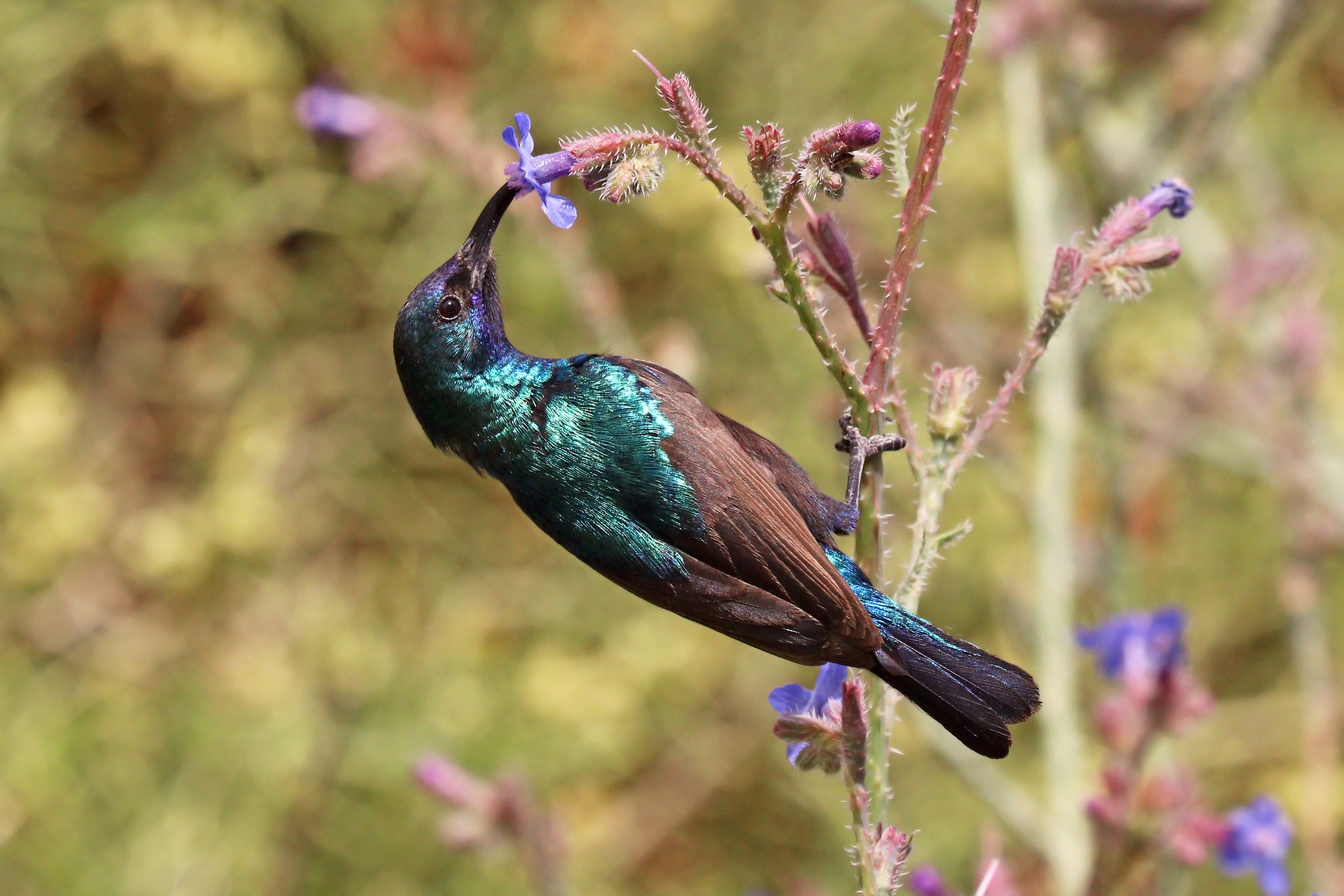
Male Palestine sunbird (Cinnyris osea osea)

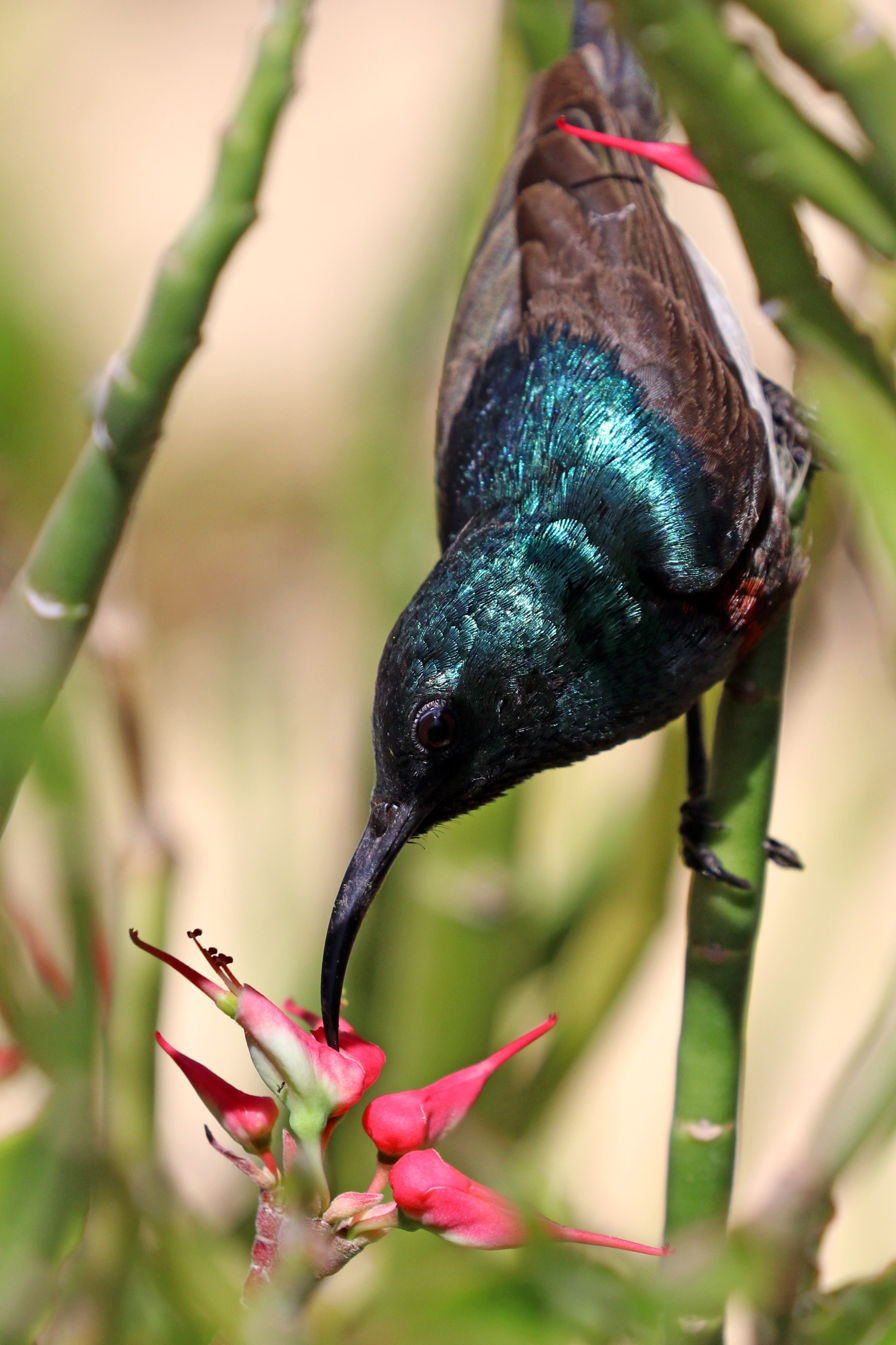
Male Cinnyris sovimanga apolis

Cinnyris is a genus of sunbirds. Its members are sometimes included in Nectarinia. They are generally known as double-collared sunbirds because the fringe of their bib usually includes a band of contrastingly coloured feathers.

The sunbirds are a group of very small Old World passerine birds which feed largely on nectar, although they will also take insects, especially when feeding young. Flight is fast and direct on their short wings. Most species can take nectar by hovering like a hummingbird, but usually perch to feed.

== Taxonomy ==
The genus Cinnyris was introduced by the French naturalist Georges Cuvier in 1816. The type species was designated as "Certhia splendida Shaw" by George Robert Gray in 1855. This taxon is a junior synonym of Certhia coccinigaster described by John Latham in 1801. This is now the splendid sunbird. The name Cinnyris is from the Ancient Greek κιννυρις (kinnyris), an unknown small bird mentioned by Hesychius of Alexandria.

It is suspected that the genus is polyphyletic and the positions of many are unresolved:

=== Species ===
The genus contains the following 63 species:

Image	Common name	Scientific name	Distribution
	Olive-bellied sunbird	Cinnyris chloropygius	African tropical rainforest
	Tiny sunbird	Cinnyris minullus	African tropical rainforest
	Eastern miombo sunbird	Cinnyris manoensis	central and eastern Africa
	Western miombo sunbird	Cinnyris gertrudis	western Africa
	Southern double-collared sunbird	Cinnyris chalybeus	southern Africa
	Neergaard's sunbird	Cinnyris neergaardi	Mozambique and South Africa
	Rwenzori double-collared sunbird	Cinnyris stuhlmanni	south central Africa
	Whyte's double-collared sunbird	Cinnyris whytei	Zambia, Malawi, and Tanzania
	Prigogine's double-collared sunbird	Cinnyris prigoginei	Democratic Republic of the Congo
	Ludwig's double-collared sunbird	Cinnyris ludovicensis	Angola, northern Malawi, and northeastern Zambia
	Northern double-collared sunbird	Cinnyris reichenowi	Burundi, Cameroon, Central African Republic, Democratic Republic of the Congo, Equatorial Guinea, Kenya, Nigeria, Rwanda, South Sudan, and Uganda
	Greater double-collared sunbird	Cinnyris afer	southern South Africa
	Regal sunbird	Cinnyris regius	Uganda to Tanzania
	Rockefeller's sunbird	Cinnyris rockefelleri	Albertine Rift montane forests
	Eastern double-collared sunbird	Cinnyris mediocris	Kenya and northern Tanzania
	Usambara double-collared sunbird	Cinnyris usambaricus	Kenya and northeast Tanzania
	Forest double-collared sunbird	Cinnyris fuelleborni	East Africa
	Moreau's sunbird	Cinnyris moreaui	Tanzania
	Beautiful sunbird	Cinnyris pulchellus	Senegal and Guinea in the west to Sudan, South Sudan, Ethiopia and northwest Kenya
	Gorgeous sunbird (split from beautiful sunbird)	Cinnyris melanogastrus	Kenya and Tanzania
	Loveridge's sunbird	Cinnyris loveridgei	Tanzania
	Marico sunbird	Cinnyris mariquensis	Angola, Botswana, Burundi, Eritrea, Eswatini, Ethiopia, Kenya, Mozambique, Namibia, Rwanda, Somalia, South Africa, South Sudan, Tanzania, Uganda, Zambia, and Zimbabwe
	Shelley's sunbird	Cinnyris shelleyi	Democratic Republic of the Congo, Malawi, Mozambique, Tanzania, Zambia and Zimbabwe
	Congo sunbird	Cinnyris congensis	Democratic Republic of the Congo
	Red-chested sunbird	Cinnyris erythrocercus	Burundi, Democratic Republic of the Congo, Ethiopia, Kenya, Rwanda, South Sudan, Tanzania, and Uganda
	Black-bellied sunbird	Cinnyris nectarinioides	Ethiopia, Kenya, Somalia, and Tanzania
	Purple-banded sunbird	Cinnyris bifasciatus	Angola, Botswana, Republic of the Congo, Democratic Republic of the Congo, Ethiopia, Eswatini, Gabon, Kenya, Malawi, Mozambique, Namibia, Rwanda, Somalia, South Africa, Tanzania, Uganda, Zambia, and Zimbabwe
	Tsavo sunbird	Cinnyris tsavoensis	Kenya and Tanzania
	Violet-breasted sunbird	Cinnyris chalcomelas	Kenya and Somalia
	Pemba sunbird	Cinnyris pembae	Pemba Island, in Tanzania
	Orange-tufted sunbird	Cinnyris bouvieri	Angola, Cameroon, Central African Republic, Republic of the Congo, Democratic Republic of the Congo, Equatorial Guinea, Gabon, Kenya, Nigeria, Uganda, and Zambia
	Palestine sunbird	Cinnyris osea	Middle East and sub-Saharan Africa
	Arabian sunbird	Cinnyris hellmayri	Oman, Saudi Arabia, and Yemen
	Abyssinian sunbird	Cinnyris habessinicus	Djibouti, Egypt, Eritrea, Ethiopia, Kenya, Somalia, Sudan, and Uganda
	Splendid sunbird	Cinnyris coccinigastrus	tropical Africa
	Johanna's sunbird	Cinnyris johannae	African tropical rainforest
	Superb sunbird	Cinnyris superbus	African tropical rainforest
	Rufous-winged sunbird	Cinnyris rufipennis	Tanzania
	Oustalet's sunbird	Cinnyris oustaleti	Angola, Malawi, Tanzania, and Zambia
	White-bellied sunbird	Cinnyris talatala	Angola, Botswana, Democratic Republic of the Congo, Eswatini, Malawi, Mozambique, Namibia, South Africa, Tanzania, Zambia, and Zimbabwe
	Variable sunbird	Cinnyris venustus	Sub-Saharan Africa
	Dusky sunbird	Cinnyris fuscus	Angola, Botswana, Namibia, and South Africa
	Ursula's sunbird	Cinnyris ursulae	Nigeria, Cameroon, and Equatorial Guinea
	Bates's sunbird	Cinnyris batesi	Central Africa
	Copper sunbird	Cinnyris cupreus	Angola, Zambia, Zimbabwe and Mozambique
	Purple sunbird	Cinnyris asiaticus	South and Southeast Asia
	Garden sunbird or olive-backed sunbird	Cinnyris jugularis	The Philippines
	Apricot-breasted sunbird	Cinnyris buettikoferi	Indonesia
	Flame-breasted sunbird	Cinnyris solaris	Timor, Wetar and Lesser Sundas
	Souimanga sunbird	Cinnyris sovimanga	Madagascar, the Aldabra Group and the Glorioso Islands
	Seychelles sunbird	Cinnyris dussumieri	Seychelles
	Malagasy green sunbird	Cinnyris notatus	Comoros and Madagascar
	Humblot's sunbird	Cinnyris humbloti	Comoros
	Anjouan sunbird	Cinnyris comorensis	Comoros
	Mayotte sunbird	Cinnyris coquerellii	Comoros
	Loten's sunbird	Cinnyris lotenius	India and Sri Lanka
	Tukangbesi sunbird	Cinnyris infrenatus	Wakatobi Islands, Indonesia
	Ornate sunbird	Cinnyris ornatus	Indochina, Sumatra, Java, Borneo and Lesser Sunda Islands
	Sahul sunbird	Cinnyris frenatus	Sulawesi to the Solomon Islands and northeast Australia
	Palawan sunbird	Cinnyris aurora	Palawan and Busuanga Islands, Philippines
	South Moluccan sunbird	Cinnyris clementiae	Maluku Islands, Indonesia
	Flores Sea sunbird	Cinnyris teysmanni	Flores Sea islands, south of Sulawesi
	Mamberamo sunbird	Cinnyris idenburgi	north New Guinea
