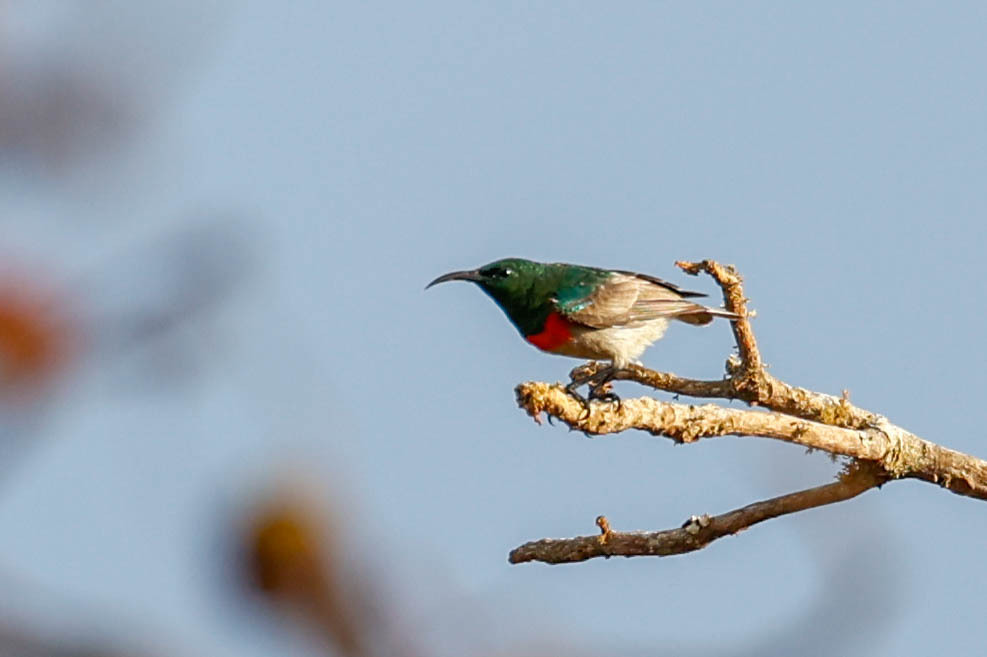

Conservation status
- Least Concern (IUCN 3.1)

Scientific classification
- Kingdom: Animalia
- Phylum: Chordata
- Class: Aves
- Order: Passeriformes
- Family: Nectariniidae
- Genus: Cinnyris
- Species: C. gertrudis

Binomial name
- Cinnyris gertrudis Grote, 1926

= Western miombo sunbird =

Species of bird

The western miombo sunbird (Cinnyris gertrudis) is a species of bird in the family Nectariniidae. It is found in eastern Africa.
