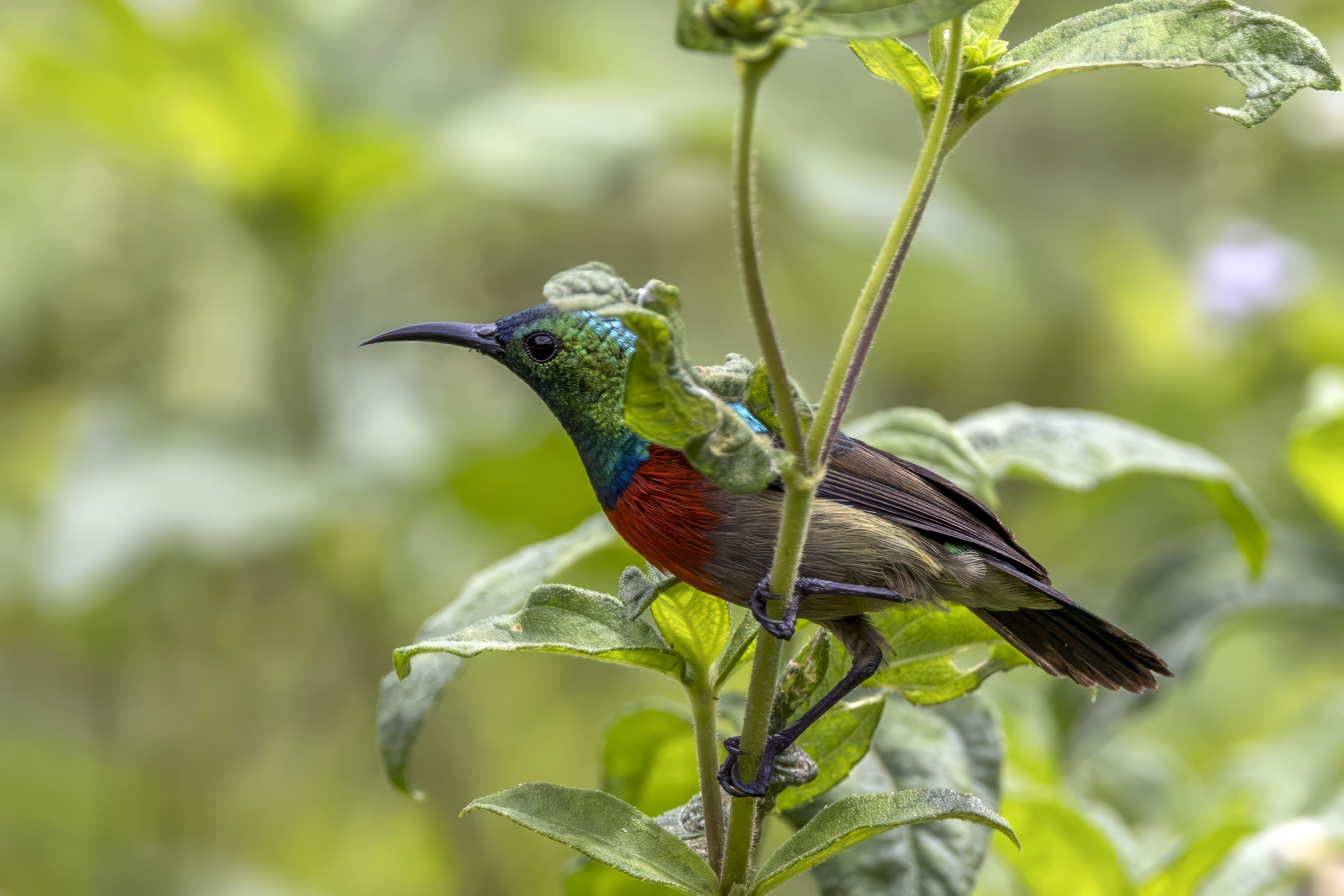
- Male, Ankasa, Ghana
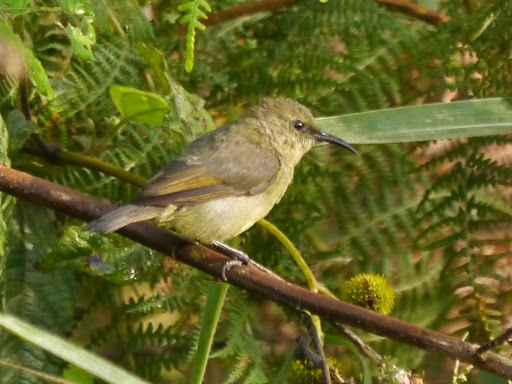
- Female, Bioko, Equatorial Guinea

Conservation status
- Least Concern (IUCN 3.1)

Scientific classification
- Kingdom: Animalia
- Phylum: Chordata
- Class: Aves
- Order: Passeriformes
- Family: Nectariniidae
- Genus: Cinnyris
- Species: C. minullus

Binomial name
- Cinnyris minullus Reichenow, 1899

Synonyms
- Nectarinia minullus

= Tiny sunbird =

Species of bird

The tiny sunbird (Cinnyris minullus) is a species of bird in the family Nectariniidae. It is sparsely distributed across the African tropical rainforest.

== Description ==
The tiny sunbird is the smallest species in the genus. The adult male has a metallic green head, back and throat, dark brown wings, a metallic blue rump and a black tail with a purplish-blue sheen. It has a narrow blue breast band above a wider scarlet breast band, lemon-yellow pectoral tufts and a dark olive belly. The adult female has an olive-brown head and upper parts, dark brown wings and dark brown tail. There is an olive-yellow supercilium over the eye, the throat is grey and the underparts are olive washed with yellow. The eyes in both sexes are dark brown and the beak and legs are black. The juvenile resembles the female.

== Ecology ==
The tiny sunbird is found in primary and secondary forests, forest edges, clearings and among scattered trees in savanna country and around villages. It forages in the canopy singly or in pairs, and sometimes joins small, mixed species flocks. It feeds on nectar, insects and spiders.

== Status ==
The tiny sunbird is described as a widespread species that is generally not uncommon. However it is rare in Nigeria, mainland Equatorial Guinea and Uganda, while being common in the Democratic Republic of Congo. It has a very wide range, and the population trend is thought to be steady. No particular threats have been identified and the International Union for Conservation of Nature has assessed the bird's conservation status as being of "least concern".
