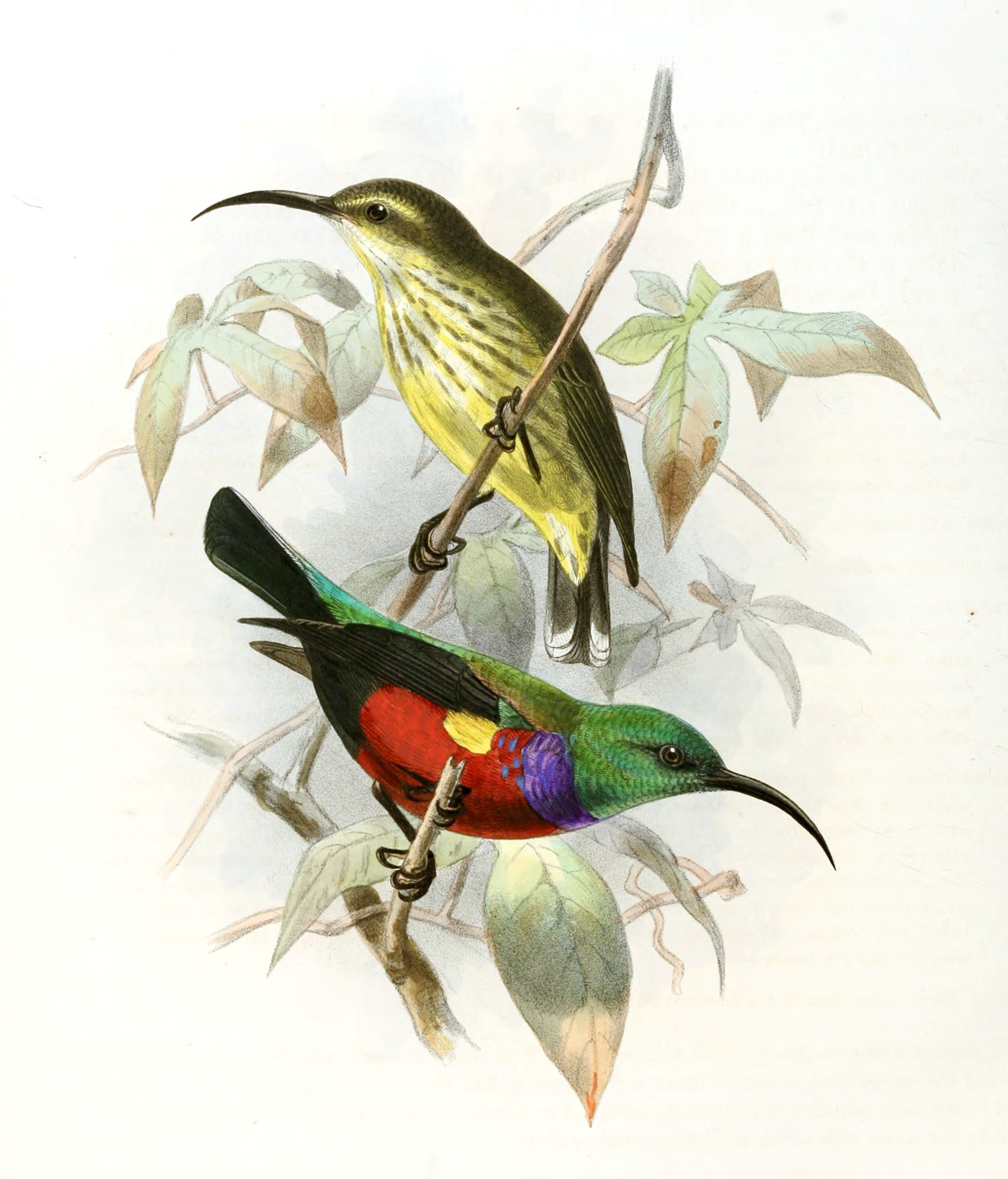
- Female (top), male (bottom)
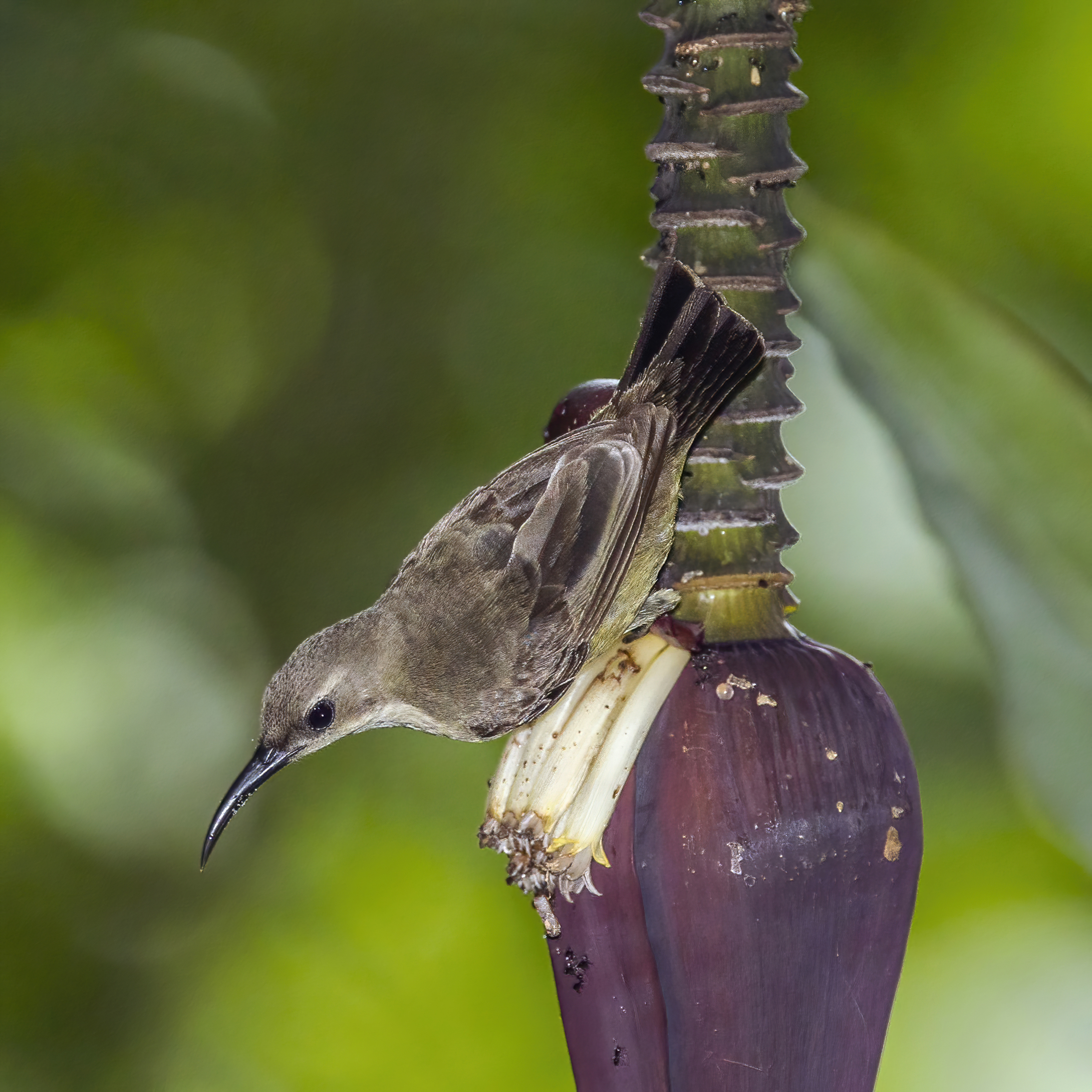
- Female, Ghana

Conservation status
- Least Concern (IUCN 3.1)

Scientific classification
- Kingdom: Animalia
- Phylum: Chordata
- Class: Aves
- Order: Passeriformes
- Family: Nectariniidae
- Genus: Cinnyris
- Species: C. johannae

Binomial name
- Cinnyris johannae Verreaux & Verreaux, 1851

Synonyms
- Nectarinia johannae

= Johanna's sunbird =

Species of bird

Johanna's sunbird (Cinnyris johannae) is a species of bird in the family Nectariniidae. It is widely spread across the African tropical rainforest. It is named after Johanna Verreaux, wife of French naturalist Édouard Verreaux.
