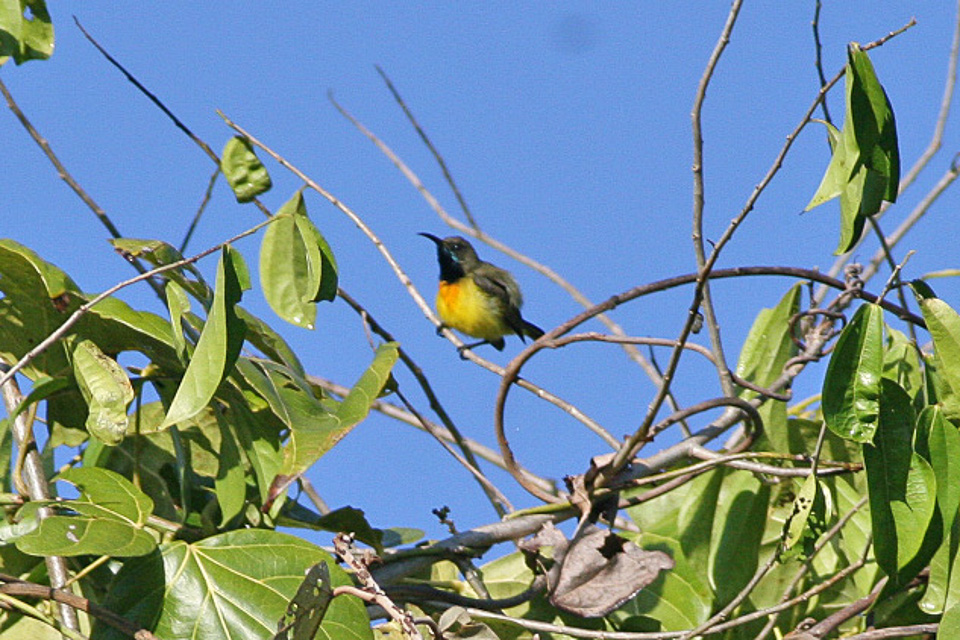

Conservation status
- Least Concern (IUCN 3.1)

Scientific classification
- Kingdom: Animalia
- Phylum: Chordata
- Class: Aves
- Order: Passeriformes
- Family: Nectariniidae
- Genus: Cinnyris
- Species: C. buettikoferi

Binomial name
- Cinnyris buettikoferi Hartert, 1896

= Apricot-breasted sunbird =

Species of bird

The apricot-breasted sunbird (Cinnyris buettikoferi) is a species of bird belonging to the family Nectariniidae. It is endemic to the island of Sumba in Indonesia, where its natural habitats are subtropical or tropical moist lowland forests and subtropical or tropical moist montane forests. Although it is quite common, very little is known about its biology, with virtually nothing known about its breeding or diet.

== Taxonomy ==
German ornithologist Ernst Hartert first described the apricot-breasted sunbird with the scientific name Cinnyris büttikoferi in 1896, using a specimen collected on the Indonesian island of Sumba, which is part of the central Lesser Sunda Islands. It is a monotypic species, though it is sometimes considered conspecific with the olive-backed sunbird.

The genus name Cinnyris is from the Greek kinnuris (κιννυρις), the name given to a small (but unidentified) bird by the Greek author Hesychius. The species name honors Swiss zoologist Johann Büttikofer, who had described several females but refrained from naming them as a new species, as he hadn't seen any males.

== Description ==
The apricot-breasted sunbird is a medium-sized sunbird, measuring 11 cm (4.3 in) in length. The male has an olive-brown back and neck with a greyer-brown crown, a somewhat glossy, blackish tail tipped with brown, and brown flight feathers edged in green. His underparts are largely yellow, though from chin to upper breast is an iridescent purplish-blue, with an orange breast band caudal to that. The female is similar to the male, but her whole underside is yellow, with olive-green sides to the breast. Both sexes have blackish feet and dark brown irises. The male's bill is black, while the female's is dark brown. The juvenile is undescribed.

== Range and habitat ==
Endemic to Sumba, the apricot-breasted sunbird is found at elevations ranging from sea level to at least 950 m (3,120 ft).

== Ecology ==
Though the apricot-breasted sunbird is common on Sumba, with an estimated population of 750,000, little is known about its biology. It is typically conspicuous, and generally found singly or in pairs. Though it forages primarily in the mid-storey to canopy (or occasionally lower), nothing is known about its diet. Its breeding is equally mysterious, with nothing known about courtship behaviour, nest, eggs or young.

== Conservation status ==
Because of its large and apparently stable population, the apricot-breasted sunbird has been rated as a species of least concern by the International Union for Conservation of Nature. Although it is confined to Sumba, it is found all across the island — an area of roughly 13,100 km^{2} (5,100 sq mi).
