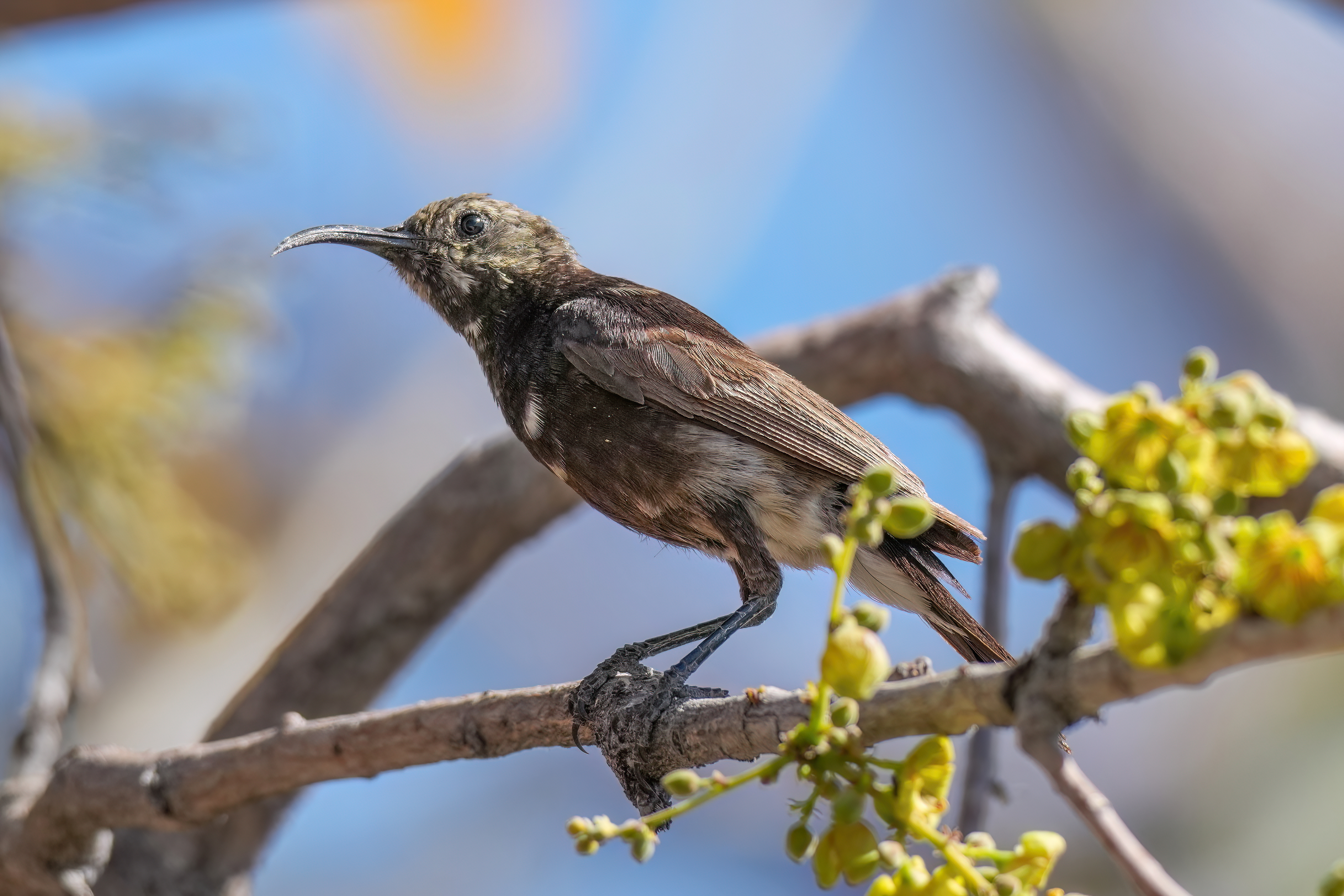
- in Damaraland, Namibia

Conservation status
- Least Concern (IUCN 3.1)

Scientific classification
- Kingdom: Animalia
- Phylum: Chordata
- Class: Aves
- Order: Passeriformes
- Family: Nectariniidae
- Genus: Cinnyris
- Species: C. fuscus

Binomial name
- Cinnyris fuscus Vieillot, 1819

Synonyms
- Nectarinia fusca

= Dusky sunbird =

Species of bird

The dusky sunbird (Cinnyris fuscus) is a species of bird in the family Nectariniidae. This relatively dull sunbird is found in arid savanna, thickets and shrubland (e.g. Karoo) in Angola, Botswana, Namibia, and South Africa.

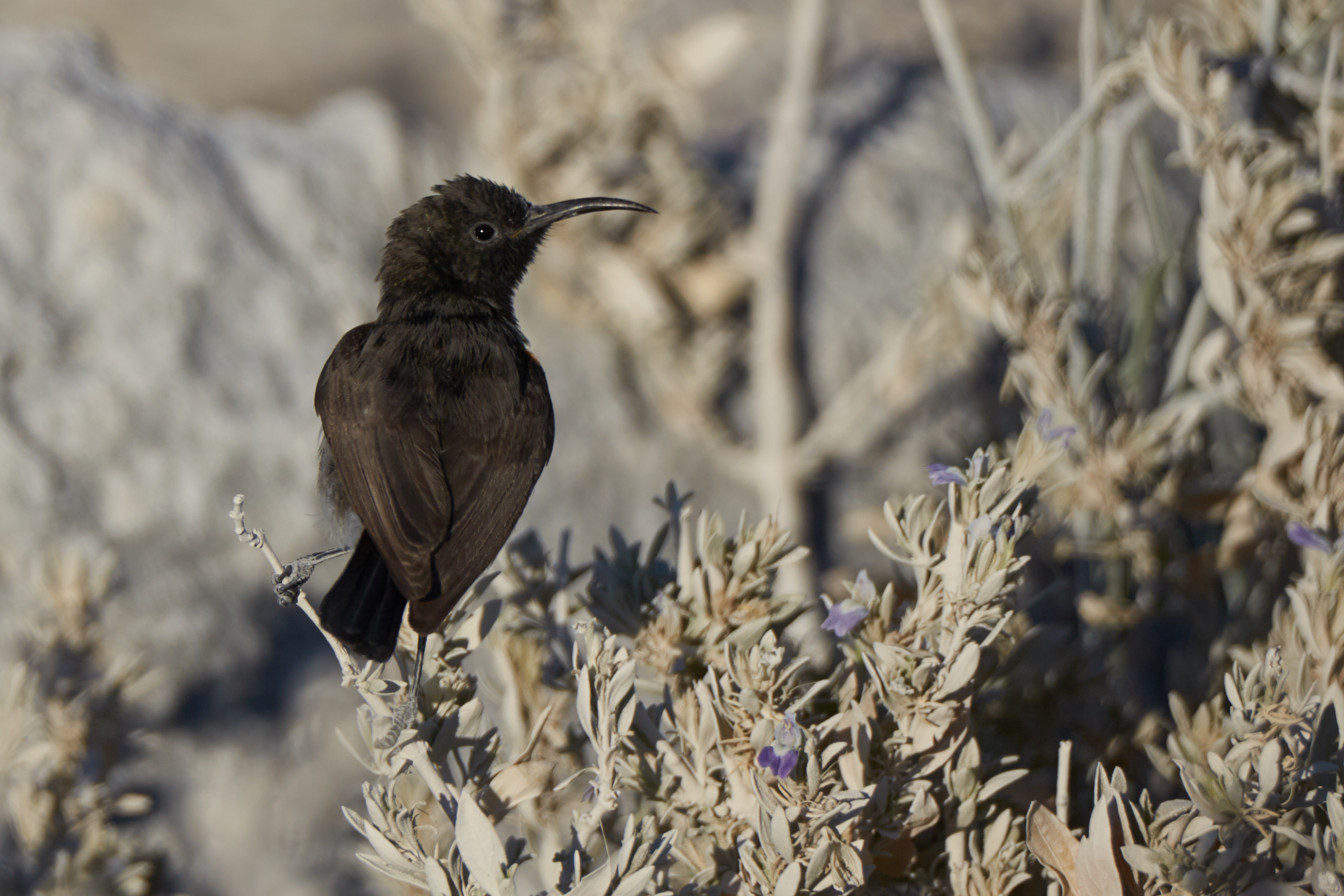
Dusky sunbird near Halali in Etosha National Park Namibia
