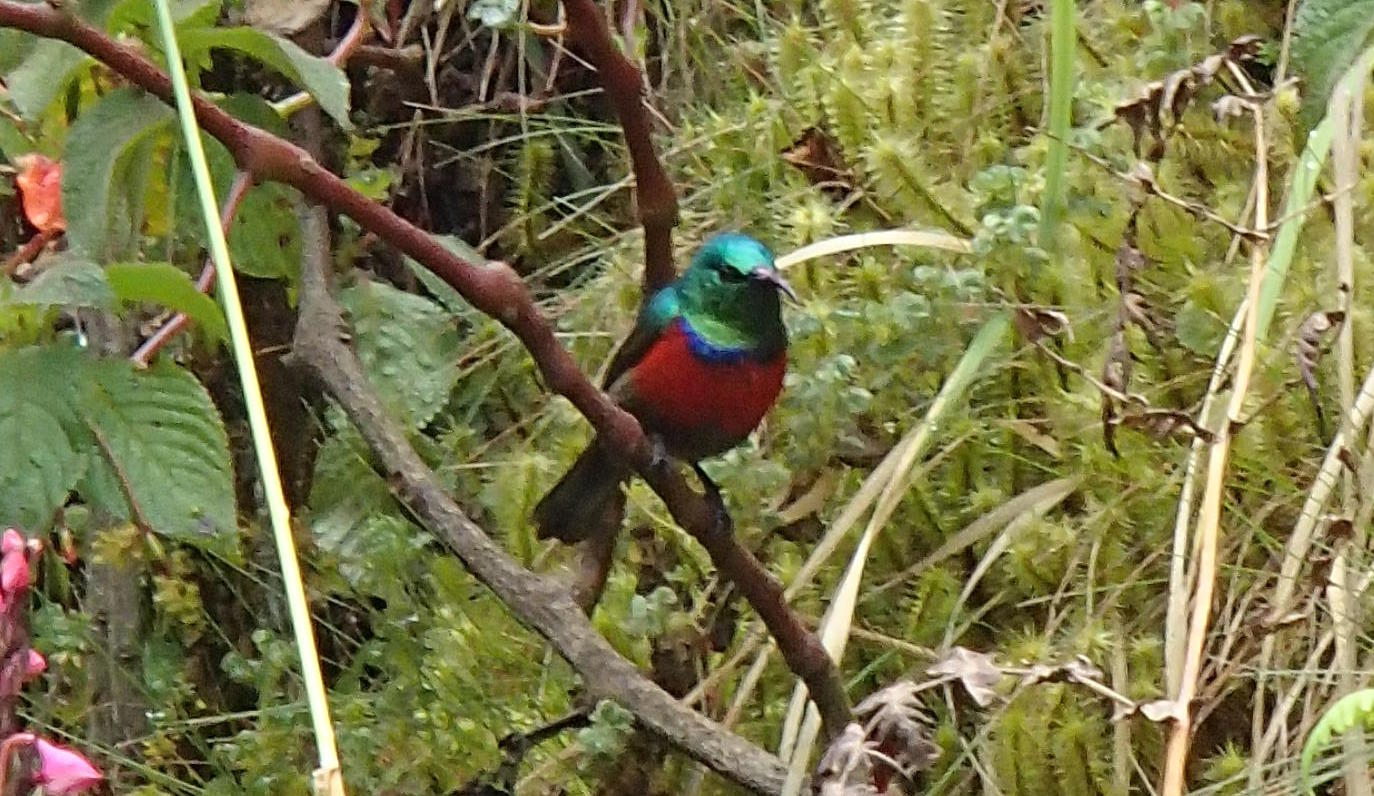

Conservation status
- Least Concern (IUCN 3.1)

Scientific classification
- Kingdom: Animalia
- Phylum: Chordata
- Class: Aves
- Order: Passeriformes
- Family: Nectariniidae
- Genus: Cinnyris
- Species: C. stuhlmanni

Binomial name
- Cinnyris stuhlmanni Reichenow, 1893

Synonyms
- Cinnyris afer stuhlmanni; Nectarinia afer stuhlmanni

= Rwenzori double-collared sunbird =

Species of bird

The Rwenzori double-collared sunbird (Cinnyris stuhlmanni), also called Stuhlmann's sunbird or the Rwanda double-collared sunbird, is a species of bird in the family Nectariniidae. It is found in the Ruwenzori range of mountains in south central Africa. Its natural habitat is subtropical or tropical dry forests. It is threatened by habitat loss. It is sometimes considered to be a subspecies of the greater double-collared sunbird (Cinnyris afer). Some authors consider this bird to be part of a species complex with Cinnyris afer, where it joins Ludwig's double-collared sunbird (Cinnyris ludovicensis) and Prigogine's double-collared sunbird (Cinnyris prigoginei). As with other closely related species, each inhabiting different locations, there are subtle similarities and differences between the local populations, and their taxonomic treatment depends on the views of the taxonomist.

== Description ==
The sunbird is a large-sized species. The adult male has a glossy, metallic green head, throat upper breast and back with no bronzy tinge. The upper-tail coverts are metallic blue and the tail black glossed with blue. The throat and upper breast are metallic green, the lower breast scarlet and the rest of the underparts are dark olive. When displaying, yellow feather tufts are visible on the shoulders. As with other sunbirds the bill is long and decurved. The eye is dark brown while the beak, legs and feet are black. The adult female has dark greyish-brown upper parts and a blackish-brown tail. The chin and supercilium are greyish-buff and the underparts brownish-grey, with the central part of the lower breast and belly being yellowish.
