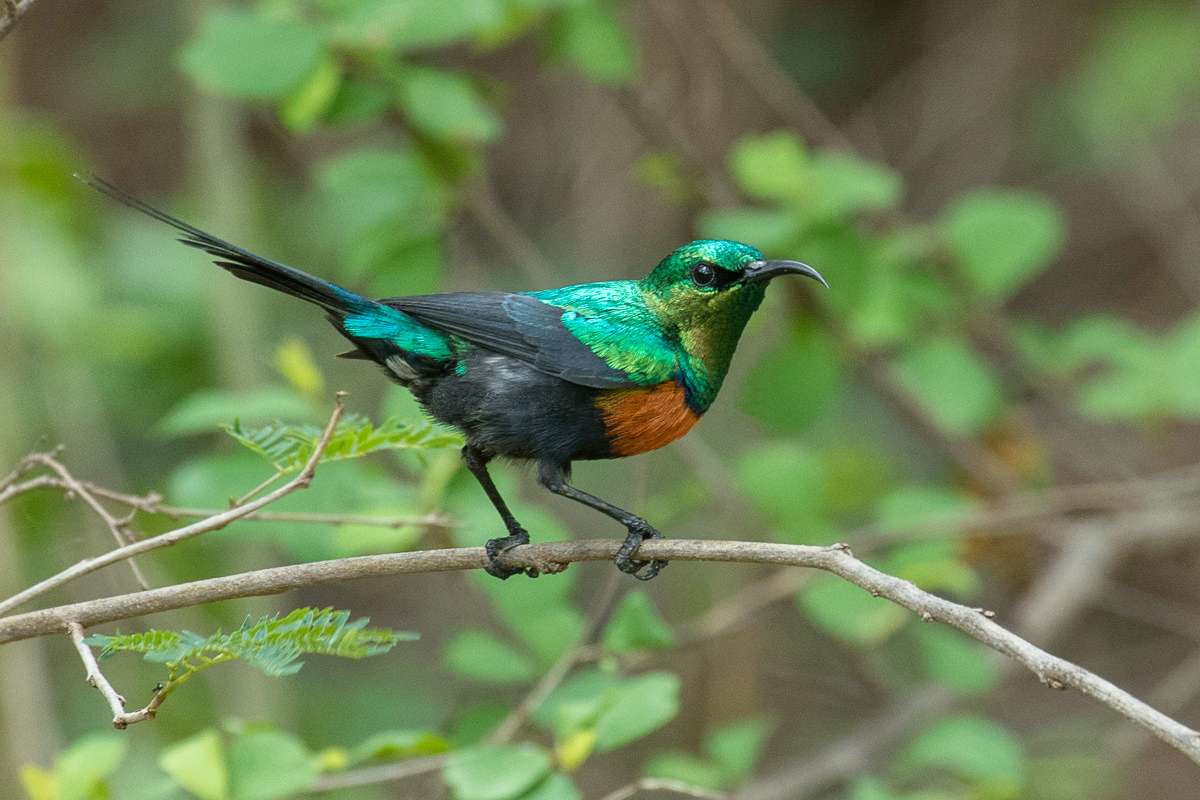

Conservation status
- Least Concern (IUCN 3.1)

Scientific classification
- Kingdom: Animalia
- Phylum: Chordata
- Class: Aves
- Order: Passeriformes
- Family: Nectariniidae
- Genus: Cinnyris
- Species: C. nectarinioides

Binomial name
- Cinnyris nectarinioides Richmond, 1897

Synonyms
- Nectarinia nectarinioides

= Black-bellied sunbird =

Species of bird

The black-bellied sunbird (Cinnyris nectarinioides) is a small sunbird located primarily in Africa. Two subspecies are recognized: the Cinnyris nectarinioides erlangeri, which is smaller and found in Ethiopia, Somalia, and Kenya; and the Cinnyris nectarinioides nectarinioides, which is larger and found in Kenya and Tanzania. This bird inhabits savannah, wetlands, and terrestrial freshwater areas.

This species has an average size of 13cm for males and 10 cm for females with both weights typically ranging from 4 to 6 grams. The black-bellied sunbird feeds on nectar, insects and spiders, the latter having gained it the nickname "spiderhunter". They forage in the higher levels of trees and perch in order to feed. These birds do not migrate in different seasons of the year, and inhabit the same area year round.

== Taxonomy ==
The black-bellied sunbird is part of the species Cinnyris nectarinioides and has two recognized subspecies. The smaller, the Cinnyris nectarinioides erlangeri inhabits Northeast Kenya and can also be found in Southeast Ethiopia and South Somalia. The larger subspecies, the Cinnyris nectarinioides nectarinioides, inhabits Southeast Kenya and Northeast Tanzania. Both subspecies are similar in most aspects besides size. Their songs are also very similar.

== Description ==
The black-bellied sunbird can be characterized by a curved bill used for nectar feeding and a small frame. These birds often weigh just 4–6 grams and as grown males tend to be around 13 cm large, while females remain around 10 cm. This sunbird is sexually dimorphic with differences in plumage between males and females and slight differences between breeding and non-breeding males.

A breeding male has a golden-green head, upperparts, chin, and throat. The bases of its feathers and upper tail are black with the rest of the upper tail being a dark metallic blue. Feathers are occasionally purple or a lustrous greenish-blue at the edges, with faint blue bands stretching across the feathers. They have an orange breastband, that is redder in the erlangeri species, tufts of yellow on the pecs and slight streaks of white on their flanks. The male's bill and legs are both black. The non-breeding males are similar, differentiated only by upperparts being a more dull brown and some white-yellow underparts, also known as eclipse plumage.

Female plumage is yellow-olive with streaks of dark brown on their crown. One distinguishing feature is the streak of yellow above their eye. Their tail is similar to the male, only differentiated by white tips and edges. The middle of a female belly and its undertail are pale yellow and its beak and legs are black like their male counterparts.

== Habitat ==
The black-bellied sunbird is predominantly located in Kenya. Its main habitats are savannah, terrestrial areas, and inland wetlands and freshwater. It inhabits 4 main countries total: Kenya, Ethiopia, Tanzania, and Somalia. Though the population size has not been quantified, the species is marked as locally common in Kenya. It is described as uncommon in Somalia and rare in Ethiopia. The species is located in some protected areas though the species itself is not protected. The sunbird prefers areas of arid savanna and river vegetation.

== Range ==
There are no fluctuations in the black-bellied sunbird area of occupancy. They inhabit the same location year-round. Unlike other birds, these do not migrate in the winter. They are mostly concentrated in the eastern edge of Africa, only coming as far west as Northeastern Kenya.

== Song and call ==
The black-bellied sunbird calls 6–20 "chip" notes that are repeated over 5 times per second. There is a brief rising and falling of a "tsi" note that accelerates near the end of successive calls. The entirety of the call often repeats for a period of over 3 minutes.

== Diet and feeding ==
The primary food source for the black-bellied sunbird is nectar, though they also feed on insects and spiders. In order to find the latter two, this bird will often forage in the high levels of trees. When feeding on nectar, they prefer acacias, baobab, and mistletoes. Despite feeding on nectar like a hummingbird, they do not float while feeding, but instead perch on the flowers they feed on.
