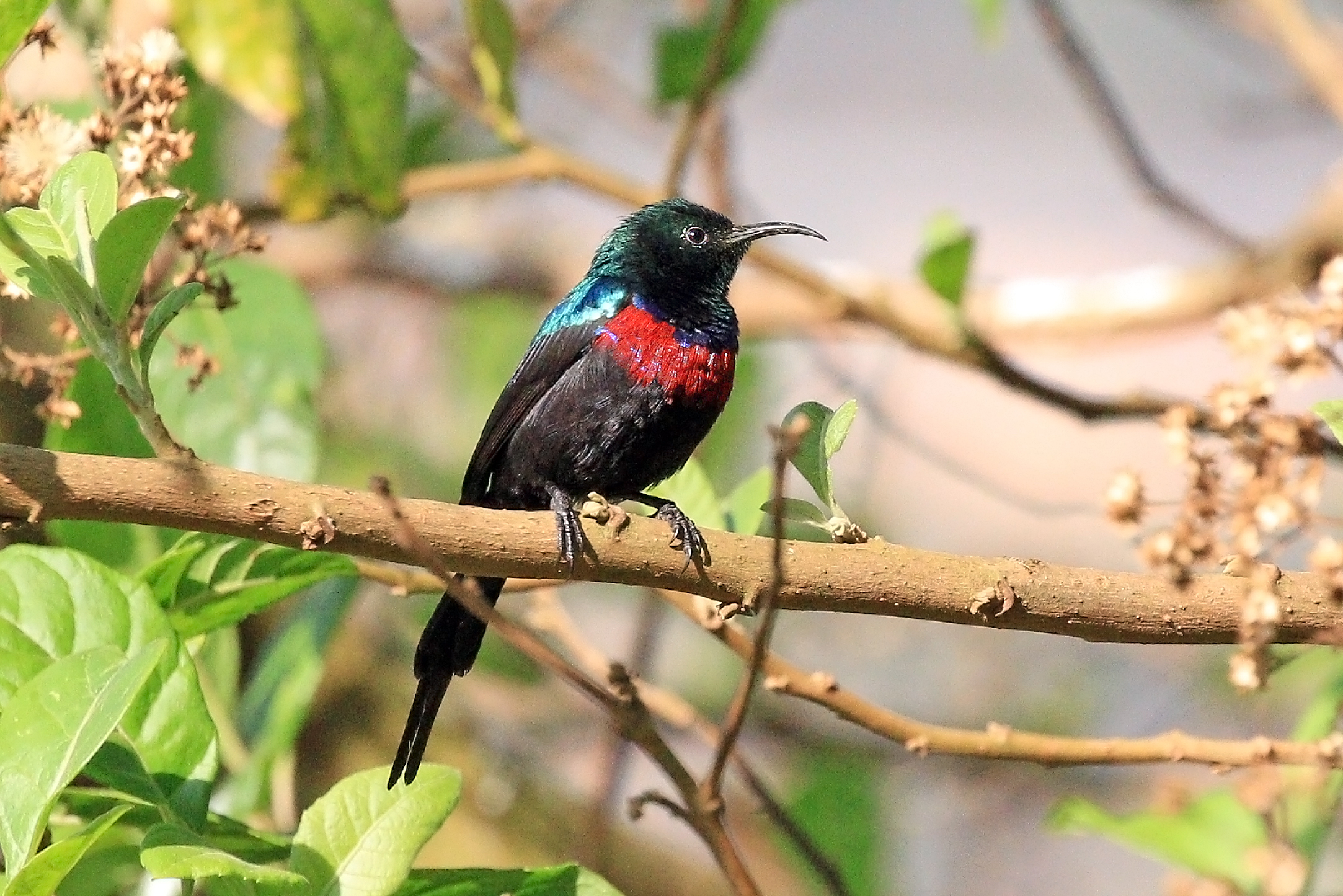
- Male, Lake Bunyonyi, Uganda

Conservation status
- Least Concern (IUCN 3.1)

Scientific classification
- Kingdom: Animalia
- Phylum: Chordata
- Class: Aves
- Order: Passeriformes
- Family: Nectariniidae
- Genus: Cinnyris
- Species: C. erythrocercus

Binomial name
- Cinnyris erythrocercus (Hartlaub, 1857)

Synonyms
- Nectarinia erythrocerca Hartlaub, 1857; Cinnyris mariquensis kiwuensis Berger, 1907; Nectarinia mariquensis kiwuensis (Berger, 1907); Nectarinia adolfifriederici Reichenow, 1908; Nectarinia erythrocerca adolfi-friederici (Reichenow, 1908)

= Red-chested sunbird =

Species of bird

The red-chested sunbird (Cinnyris erythrocercus) is a species of bird in the family Nectariniidae. It is found in Burundi, Democratic Republic of the Congo, Ethiopia, Kenya, Rwanda, South Sudan, Tanzania, and Uganda.

== Taxonomy and systematics ==
The red-chested sunbird was originally described as Nectarinia erythrocercus by Gustav Hartlaub in 1857 based on specimens collected near the White Nile.
