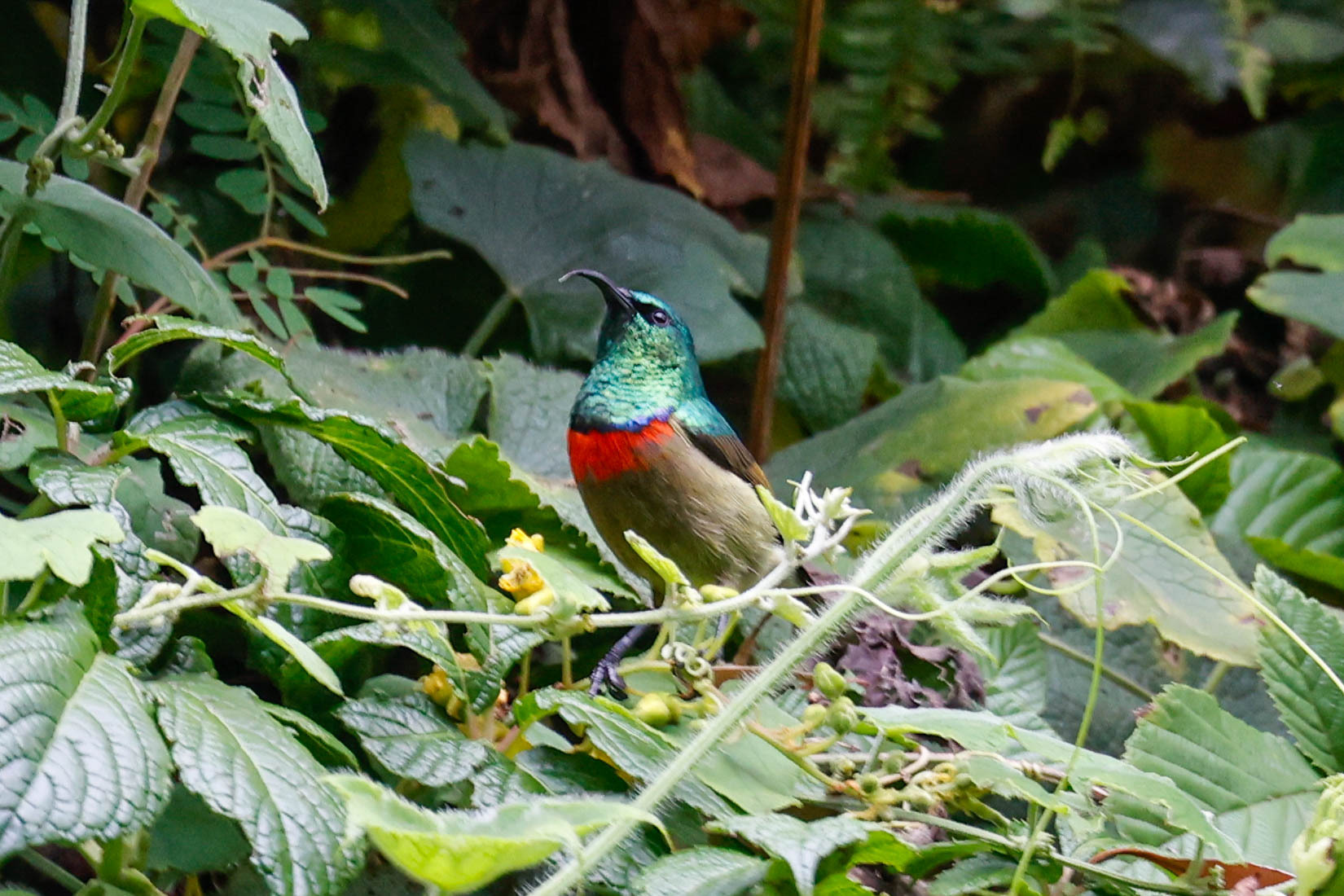

Conservation status
- Near Threatened (IUCN 3.1)

Scientific classification
- Kingdom: Animalia
- Phylum: Chordata
- Class: Aves
- Order: Passeriformes
- Family: Nectariniidae
- Genus: Cinnyris
- Species: C. usambaricus

Binomial name
- Cinnyris usambaricus Grote, 1922

= Usambara double-collared sunbird =

Species of bird

The Usambara double-collared sunbird (Cinnyris usambaricus) is a species of bird in the family Nectariniidae. It is a resident breeder in the tropical moist montane forests of southeast Kenya and Tanga Region of Tanzania.

== Taxonomy ==
The Usambara double-collared sunbird was described as a subspecies of the eastern double-collared sunbird by the German ornithologist Hermann Grote in 1922 and given the trinomial name Cinnyris mediocris usambaricus. He description was based on specimens collected in the Usambara Mountains of Tanzania. It was promoted to species status based on differences in plumage and genetics. The species is monotypic.
