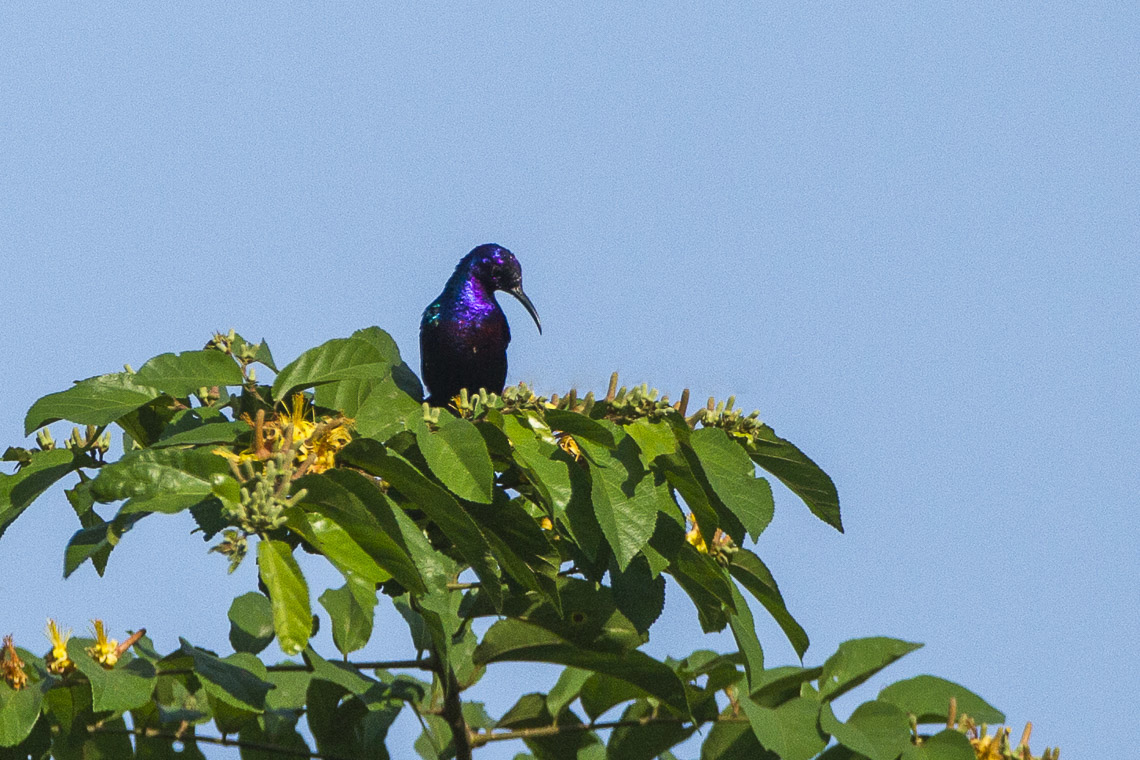

Conservation status
- Least Concern (IUCN 3.1)

Scientific classification
- Kingdom: Animalia
- Phylum: Chordata
- Class: Aves
- Order: Passeriformes
- Family: Nectariniidae
- Genus: Cinnyris
- Species: C. superbus

Binomial name
- Cinnyris superbus (Shaw, 1812)

Synonyms
- Nectarinia superba

= Superb sunbird =

Species of bird

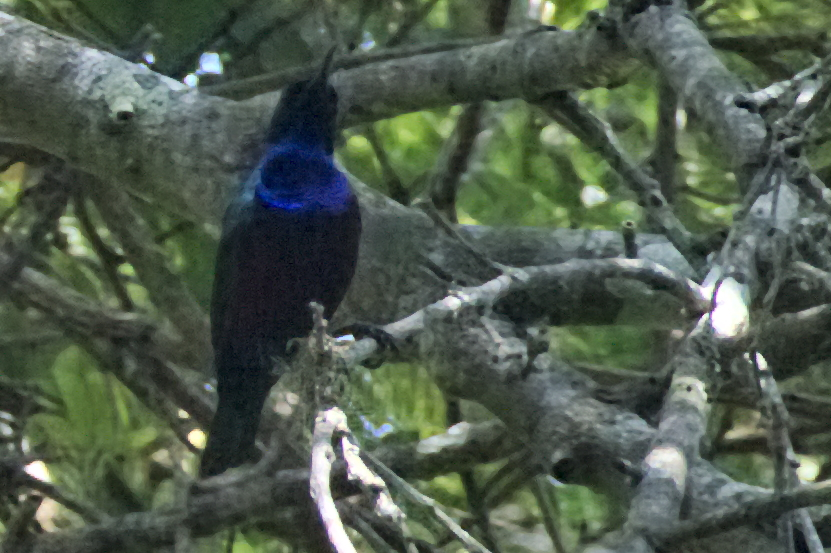
Superb Sunbird, male

The superb sunbird (Cinnyris superbus) is a species of bird in the family Nectariniidae. It is widely spread across the African tropical rainforest.
