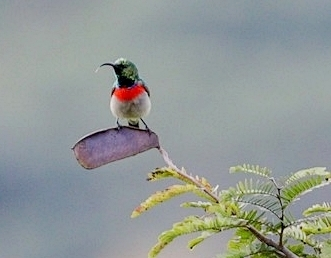
- Male bird near Mazowe, Zimbabwe

Conservation status
- Least Concern (IUCN 3.1)

Scientific classification
- Kingdom: Animalia
- Phylum: Chordata
- Class: Aves
- Order: Passeriformes
- Family: Nectariniidae
- Genus: Cinnyris
- Species: C. manoensis

Binomial name
- Cinnyris manoensis Reichenow, 1907

= Eastern miombo sunbird =

Species of bird

The eastern miombo sunbird or miombo double-collared sunbird (Cinnyris manoensis) is a species of bird in the family Nectariniidae. It is found in central and eastern Africa.
