= Rockefeller's sunbird =

Conservation status
- Vulnerable (IUCN 3.1)

Scientific classification
- Kingdom: Animalia
- Phylum: Chordata
- Class: Aves
- Order: Passeriformes
- Family: Nectariniidae
- Genus: Cinnyris
- Species: C. rockefelleri

Binomial name
- Cinnyris rockefelleri Chapin, 1932

Synonyms
- Nectarinia rockefelleri

Species of bird

Rockefeller's sunbird (Cinnyris rockefelleri) is a species of bird in the family Nectariniidae.

== Taxonomy ==
This species is part of a larger radiation of sunbirds within the genus Cinnyris. Like other members of this genus, it was formerly considered part of the genus Nectarinia.

== Distribution and habitat ==
This species is only known from the Albertine Rift in eastern Democratic Republic of the Congo, where it is found in montane forest between 2000 and 3300 m in elevation. Sight records of this species exist from Rwanda and Burundi, but these lack documentation and have yet to be confirmed.

== Conservation ==
It is threatened by habitat loss.
