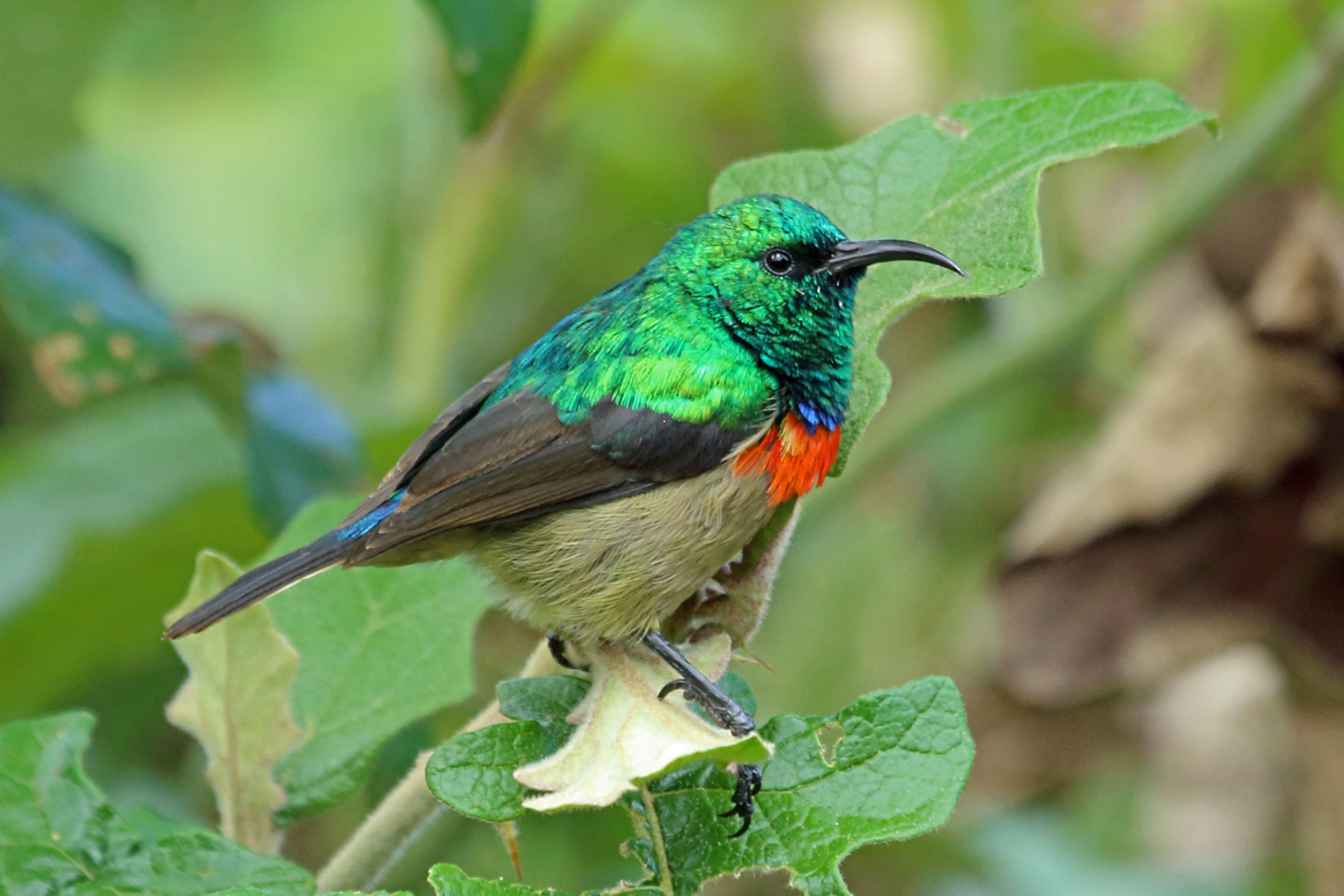

Conservation status
- Near Threatened (IUCN 3.1)

Scientific classification
- Kingdom: Animalia
- Phylum: Chordata
- Class: Aves
- Order: Passeriformes
- Family: Nectariniidae
- Genus: Cinnyris
- Species: C. moreaui

Binomial name
- Cinnyris moreaui WL Sclater, 1933

Synonyms
- Nectarinia moreaui

= Moreau's sunbird =

Species of bird

Moreau's sunbird (Cinnyris moreaui) is a species of bird in the family Nectariniidae. It is endemic to Kilolo District of Morogoro Region in Tanzania where its natural habitat is subtropical or tropical moist montane forests. It is threatened by habitat loss and the International Union for Conservation of Nature has assessed it as being "near-threatened".

== Description ==
Moreau's sunbird is a small species some 12 cm (5 in) long. The adult male has upper parts an iridescent bronzey-green, with a green rump and dark brown tail. The green throat is separated from the red to orange breast by a narrow blue band. The belly and sides of the breast are yellow. The eye is dark brown or black and the curved beak and legs are black. The adult female has upper parts olive green, with the feathers of crown and mantle fringed with metallic greenish-grey. The tail is dark brown with paler outer feathers. The chin and throat are greyish-yellow and the breast and belly olive-yellow. The eye is dark brown and the beak and legs are black. The juvenile male is similar to the adult male but the upper parts lack the iridescence and are a dusky greyish-olive, while the underparts are dusky yellowish-olive. The juvenile female resembles the adult female but is generally duller and lacks the metallic fringes to the feathers of crown and mantle. The underparts are a dull yellowish-green.

== Distribution and habitat ==
Moreau's sunbird is endemic to the mountainous parts of Tanzania where its habitat is montane forest. Its altitudinal range is between 1,350 and 1,800 m (4,429 and 5,906 ft) in most parts of its range, but it occurs up to 2,500 m (8,202 ft) in the Udzungwa Mountains in the Eastern Arc Mountains.

== Ecology ==
Moreau's sunbird is generally found in bushes alongside roads and in the forest canopy. It is sometimes present as part of mixed flocks of small birds. It feeds on nectar and probably insects. The nest is a small domed structure with a top opening, built by the female.
