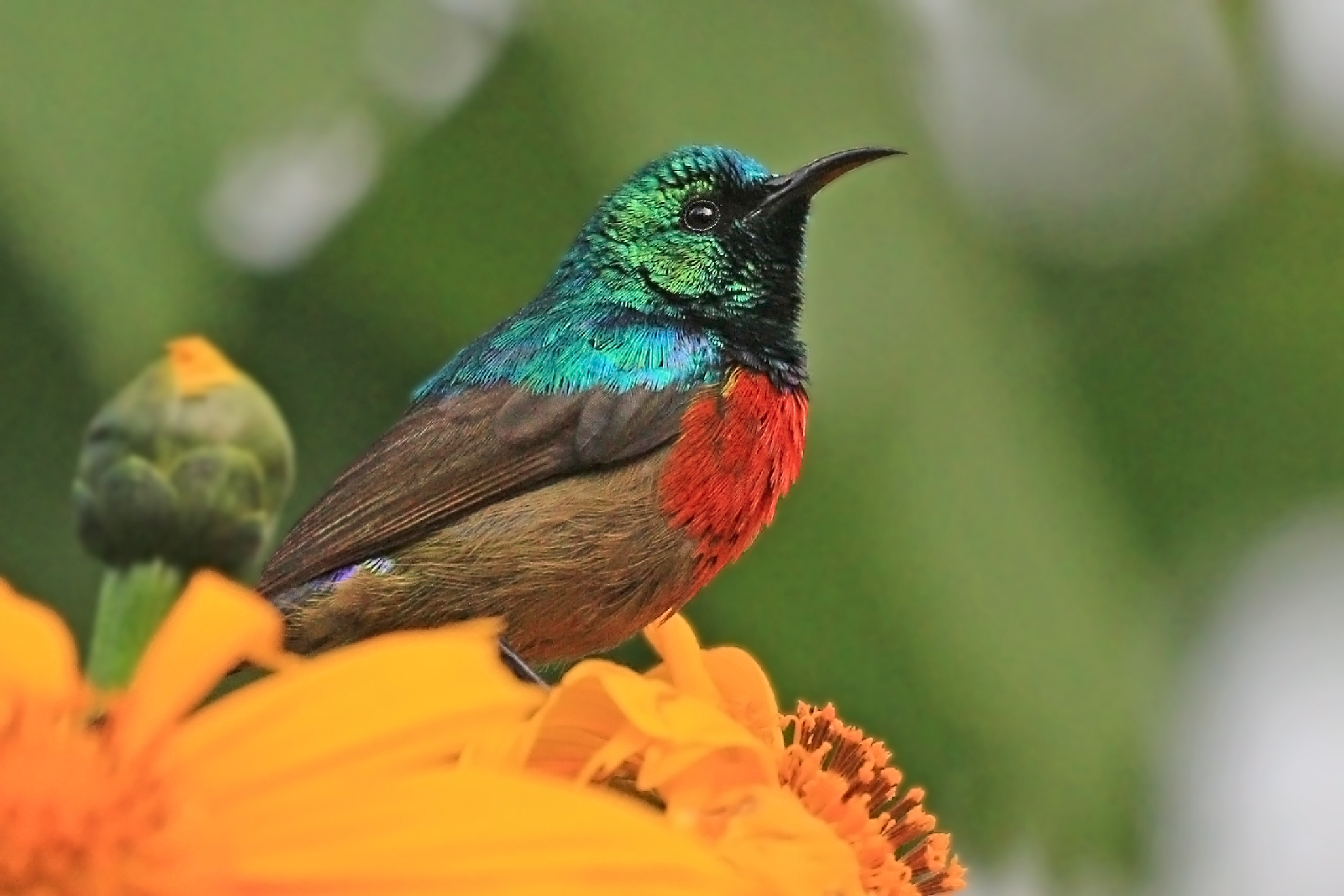
- Male; Bwindi Impenetrable Forest, Uganda

Conservation status
- Least Concern (IUCN 3.1)

Scientific classification
- Kingdom: Animalia
- Phylum: Chordata
- Class: Aves
- Order: Passeriformes
- Family: Nectariniidae
- Genus: Cinnyris
- Species: C. reichenowi

Binomial name
- Cinnyris reichenowi Sharpe, 1891

Subspecies
- C. r. reichenowi (Sharpe, 1891); C. r. preussi (Reichenow, 1892)

Synonyms
- Nectarinia preussi Cinnyris preussi Cinnyris genderuensis Cinnyris kikuyuensis Cinnyris parvirostris

= Northern double-collared sunbird =

Species of bird

The northern double-collared sunbird (Cinnyris reichenowi), is a species of bird in the family Nectariniidae. It is found in Burundi, Cameroon, Central African Republic, Democratic Republic of the Congo, Equatorial Guinea, Kenya, Nigeria, Rwanda, South Sudan, and Uganda.

== Description ==
The northern double-collared sunbird is a medium-sized species. The adult male's head and back is a metallic green that has a steely-blue sheen in some lights. The rump is greyish-brown, the uppertail coverts metallic purple and the tail black, glossed blue. The main flight feathers are dark brown. There is a narrow purple collar beneath the metallic green throat, above a scarlet breast and pale brown belly. There are pale yellow pectoral tufts that are not always visible. The eye is black or dark brown, and the beak and legs are black. The adult female is more drab with upper parts dark olive green and a dark brown tail. The underparts are greyish-olive, the belly being tinged with yellow. The juvenile is similar to the adult female.

== Taxonomy ==
The northern double-collared sunbird Cinnyris reichenowi is part of a large complex of 'double-collared sunbirds' of the genus Cinnyris found throughout sub-Saharan Africa. Mitochondrial data place this species as being most closely related to the southern double-collared sunbird C. chalybea of South Africa, though more research is warranted to confirm this relationship.

=== Classification ===
Most taxonomic authorities currently recognize two subspecies: Cinnyris reichenowi reichenowi of Eastern Africa and C. r. preussi of the Cameroon highlands, Adamawa Plateau, Mt. Cameroon, and Bioko. Three other populations have also been described within the species and later synonymized: C. r. kikuyuensis of the Kenyan highlands, now widely regarded as a synonym of C. r. reichenowi; C. r. genderuensis from Genderu mountain on the Adamawa Plateau, often considered a synonym of C. r. preussi; and C. r. parvirostris from Bioko, considered a synonym of C. r. preussi.

Given the range of variation exhibited across the species' range, subspecific distributions for the aforementioned populations were often uncertain. For example, C. r. preussi was originally believed to be restricted to Mt. Cameroon and adjacent regions, with interior parts of Cameroon being home to C. r. genderuensis. A recent re-assessment of populations found evidence for the recognition of three subspecies: rift sunbird C. r. reichenowi encompassing all East African populations; volcano sunbird C. r. preussi, found on Bioko, Mt. Cameroon, and the Cameroonian Highlands; and Genderu sunbird C. r. genderuensis, found in the xeric interior Adamawa Plateau of Cameroon, Central African Republic, and probably Nigeria.

=== Cinnyris reichenowi vs. Nectarinia preussi ===
Northern double-collared sunbird was originally described as Cinnyris reichenowi from Eastern Africa, but this species was formerly subsumed within greater Nectarinia along with the majority of African sunbirds, in which case it is referred to as Nectarinia preussi. This shift is due to the fact that golden-winged sunbird Drepanorhynchus reichenowi has taxonomic priority when also included in Nectarinia. This nomenclature shift has caused confusion between northern double-collared sunbirds and golden-winged sunbirds. Furthermore, due to this nomenclature conflict, eastern populations are sometimes referred to as Nectarinia preussi kikuyuensis due to the unavailability of reichenowi within the genus Nectarinia, and the availability of the synonym kikuyuensis.

== Ecology ==
The northern double-collared sunbird is often found in small mixed-species flocks, associating with species like white-eyes (genus Zosterops) and the oriole finch (Linurgus olivaceus). It tends to perch in the mid-storeys of trees, looking from side to side. It feeds on nectar, insects and their larvae, and spiders. The male is territorial and sings vigorously. It is aggressive throughout the year and attacks con-specific males, sometimes resulting in mid-air fights which may continue on the ground. It also does battle with the Cameroon sunbird (Cyanomitra oritis) and the olive-bellied sunbird (Cinnyris chloropygia).

== Status ==
The northern double-collared sunbird is a common species with a very wide range, and the population trend is thought to be steady. No particular threats have been identified and the International Union for Conservation of Nature has assessed the bird's conservation status as being of "least concern".
