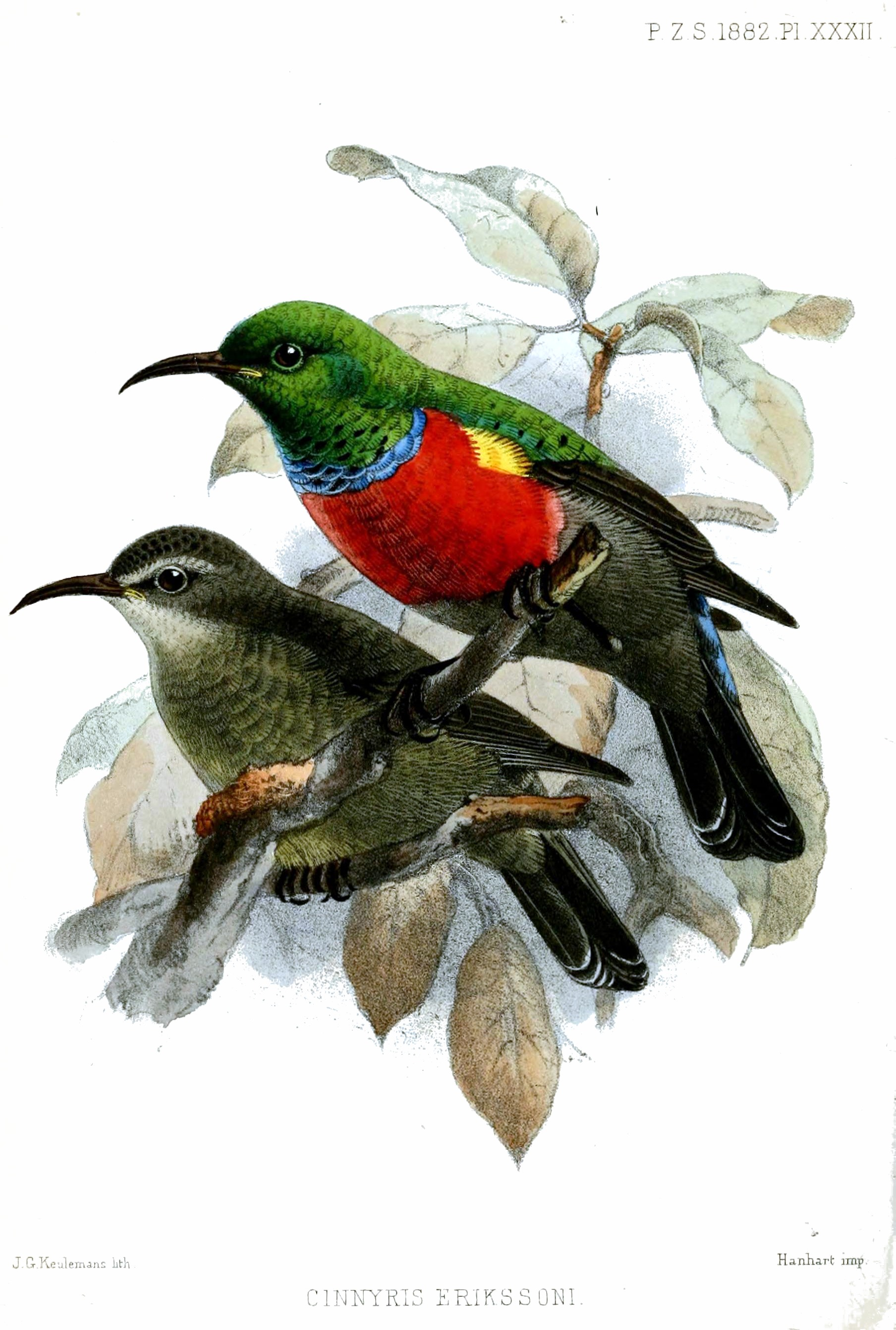

Conservation status
- Least Concern (IUCN 3.1)

Scientific classification
- Kingdom: Animalia
- Phylum: Chordata
- Class: Aves
- Order: Passeriformes
- Family: Nectariniidae
- Genus: Cinnyris
- Species: C. ludovicensis

Binomial name
- Cinnyris ludovicensis (Bocage, 1868)
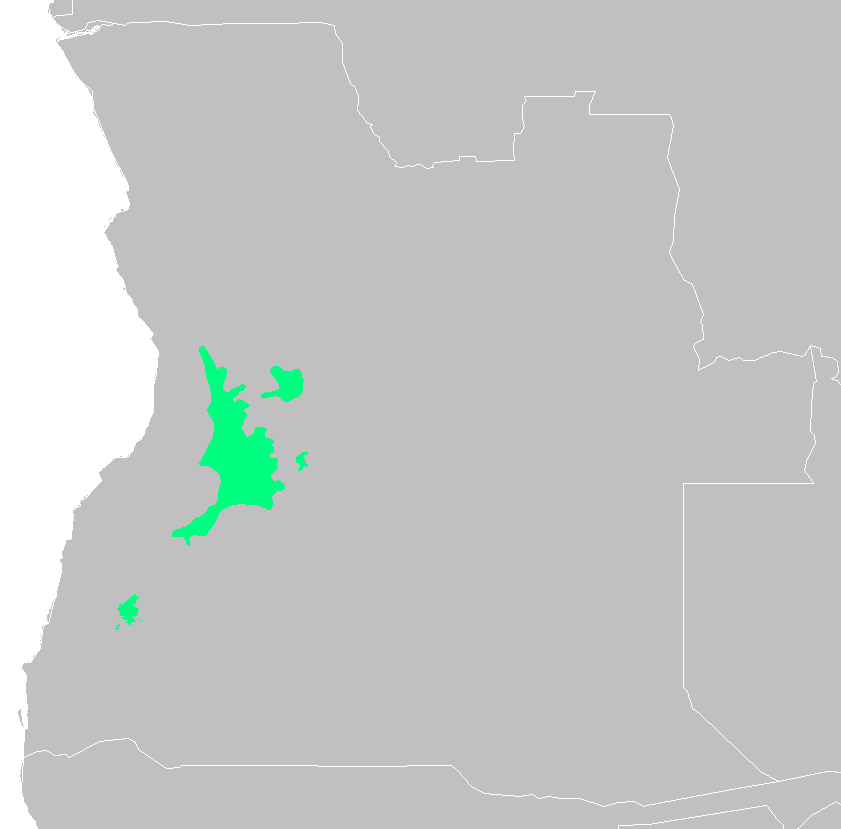
- General range: the montane forest-grassland mosaic of western Angola, besides Malawi's Nyika plateau

= Ludwig's double-collared sunbird =

Species of bird

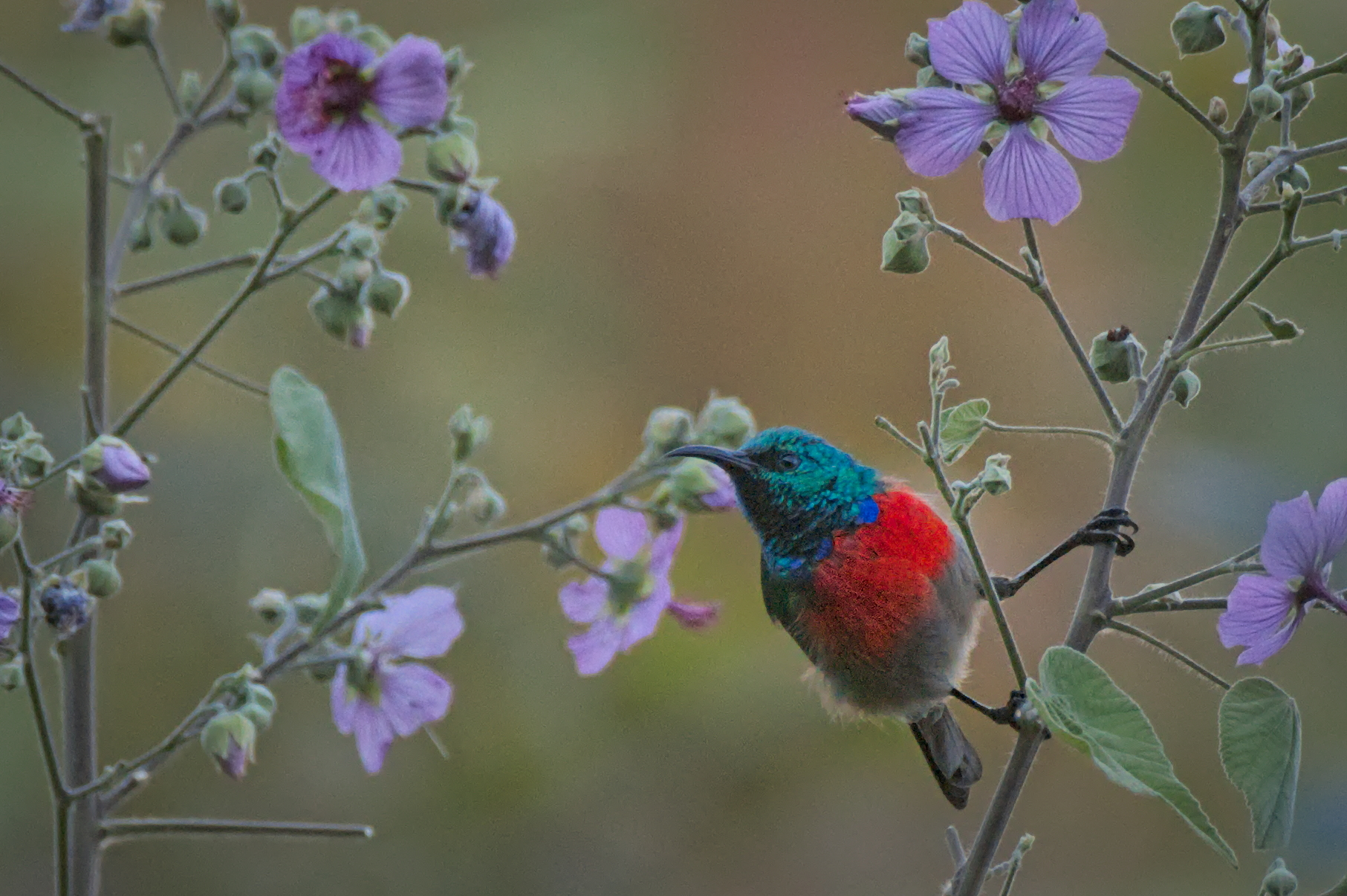
Ludwig's Double-collared Sunbird

Ludwig's double-collared sunbird (Cinnyris ludovicensis) or the montane double-collared sunbird, is a small passerine bird which breeds in forested mountains above 1,800 m (5,900 ft) in western Angola as well as the Nyika Plateau of northern Malawi and northeastern Zambia. This bird is sometimes considered to be con-specific with the greater double-collared sunbird (Cinnyris afer). It is sometimes placed in the genus Nectarinia.

== Description ==
The sunbird is a medium-size species. The adult male has a glossy, metallic green head, throat upper breast and back with a golden sheen. The upper-tail coverts are metallic blue and the tail black glossed with blue. The throat and upper breast are metallic green, the lower breast scarlet and the rest of the underparts are dark olive. When displaying, yellow feather tufts are visible on the shoulders. As with other sunbirds the bill is long and decurved. The eye is dark brown while the beak, legs and feet are black. The adult female has dark greyish-brown upper parts and a blackish-brown tail. The chin and supercilium are greyish-buff and the underparts brownish-grey, with the central part of the lower breast and belly being paler or slightly yellowish.

== Ecology ==
This bird's flight is fast and direct on short wings. It is usually seen singly or in pairs, with the male chasing away conspecifics. It feeds mainly on nectar from flowers, but takes some fruit, and, especially when feeding young, insects and spiders. It can take nectar by hovering like a hummingbird, but usually perches to feed. It is a bird of forest edges, clearings, montane grassland, plantations, secondary growth, scrubland and grassland.
