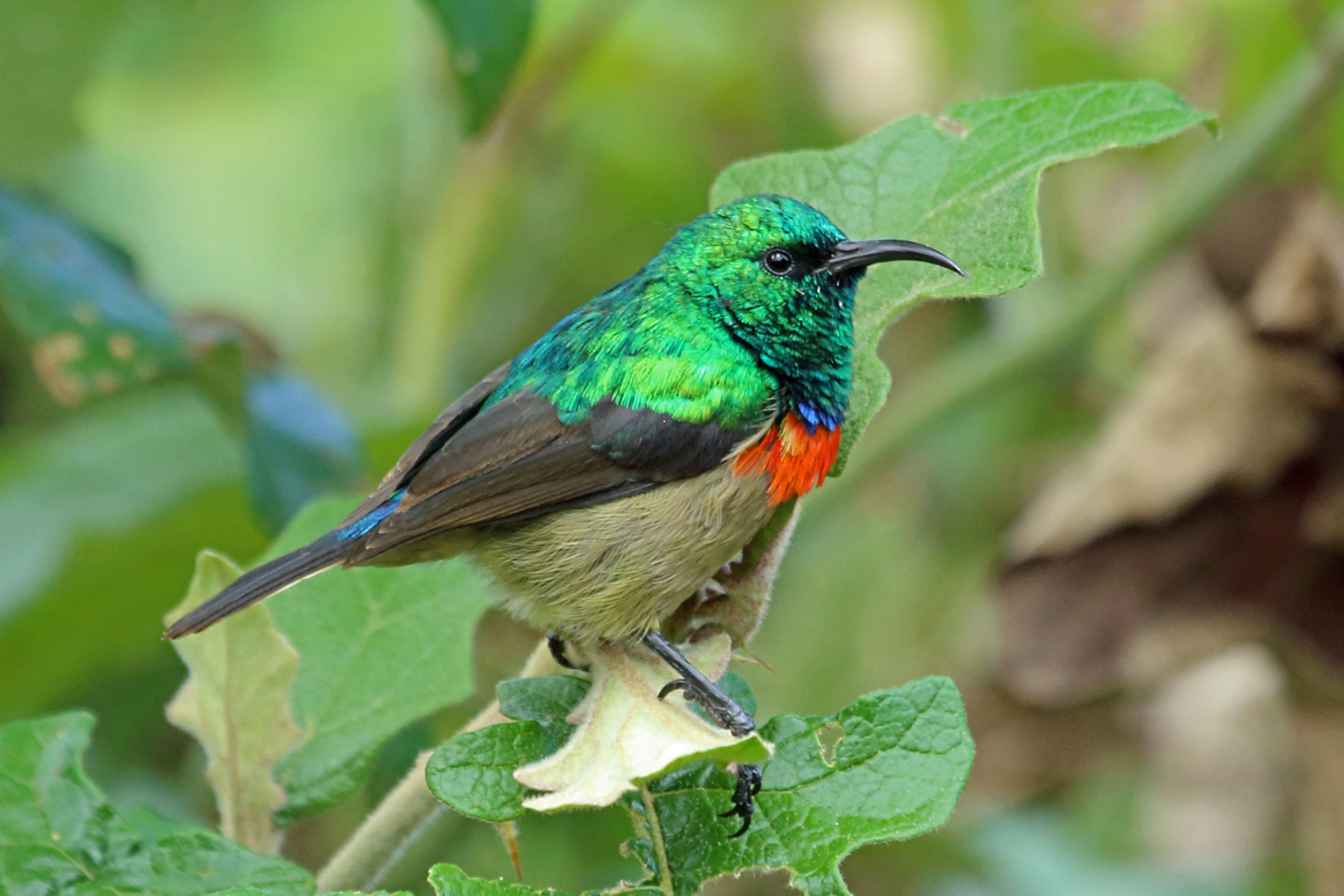

Conservation status
- Least Concern (IUCN 3.1)

Scientific classification
- Kingdom: Animalia
- Phylum: Chordata
- Class: Aves
- Order: Passeriformes
- Family: Nectariniidae
- Genus: Cinnyris
- Species: C. mediocris

Binomial name
- Cinnyris mediocris Shelley, 1885

Synonyms
- Nectarinia mediocris; Nectarinia usambarica

= Eastern double-collared sunbird =

Species of bird

The eastern double-collared sunbird (Cinnyris mediocris) is a species of bird in the family Nectariniidae. It is found in upland areas of Kenya and northern Tanzania.

== Description ==
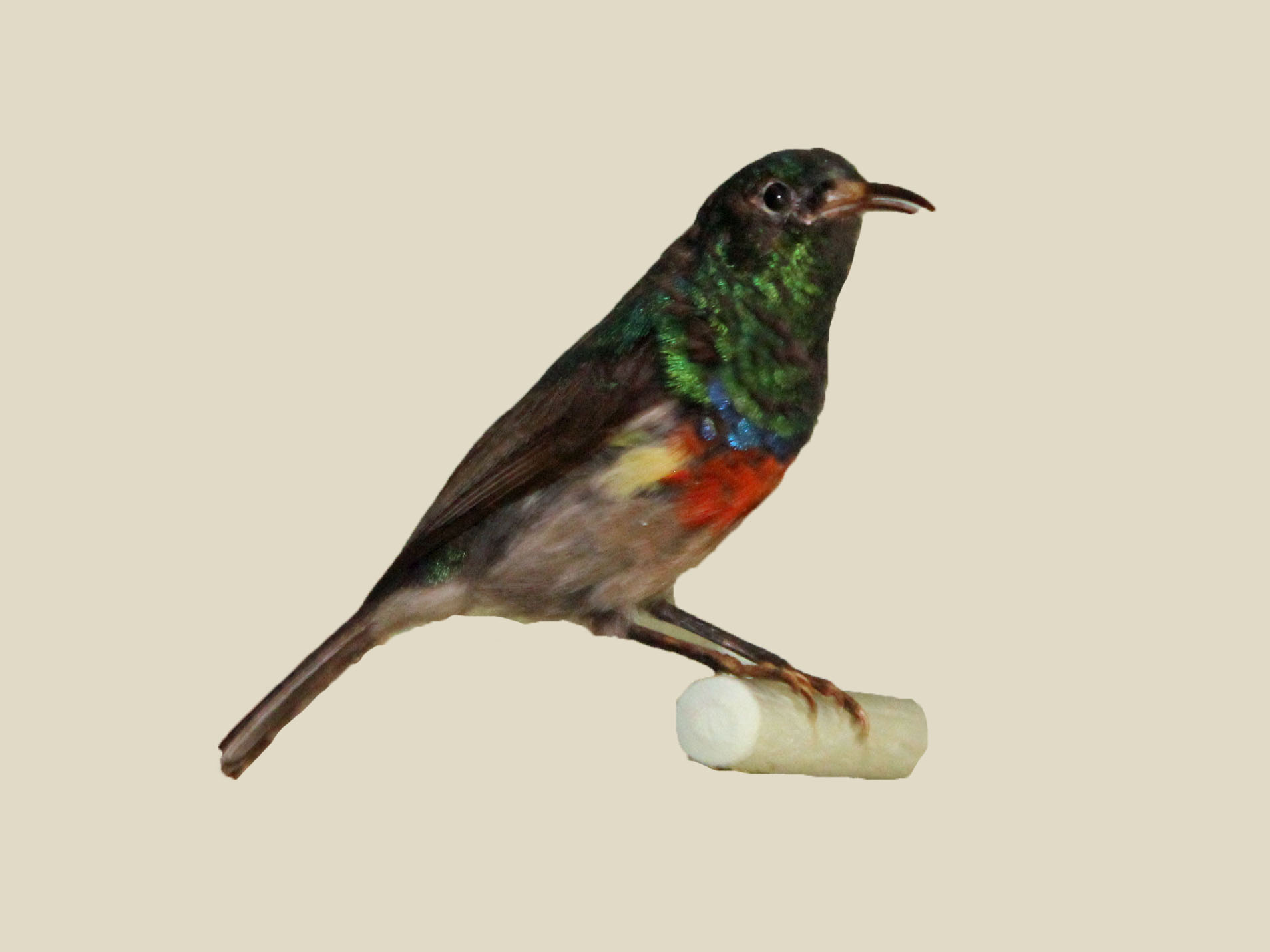
Male specimen at Nairobi National Museum

The eastern double-collared sunbird is a small species. The adult male has upper parts a metallic green, dark wings and tail, and a red breast band and olive belly. The beak is strongly curved and used to sip nectar from flowers. The adult female is olive above, with brown on the wings and yellowish-green underparts.

== Distribution and habitat ==
The eastern double-collared sunbird is native to mountainous regions of Kenya and northern Tanzania. It is found in forests, upland pasture, heathland and bamboo, at altitudes of between 600 and 1,500 m (2,000 and 4,900 ft). It descends to lower altitudes after the breeding season.

== Ecology ==
The eastern double-collared sunbird feeds alone or in pairs, or may join small flocks of mixed species, which are often led by the white-headed wood hoopoe (Phoeniculus bollei). It feeds on nectar, insects, spiders and small molluscs; the insects include flies, neuropterans and hymenopterans. Flying ants may be caught on the wing, prey invertebrates are picked off the backs of leaves, and inflorescences are explored acrobatically to extract nectar.

== Status ==
The eastern double-collared sunbird is a common species within its range. The population trend is thought to be steady, no particular threats have been identified and the International Union for Conservation of Nature has assessed its conservation status as "least concern".
