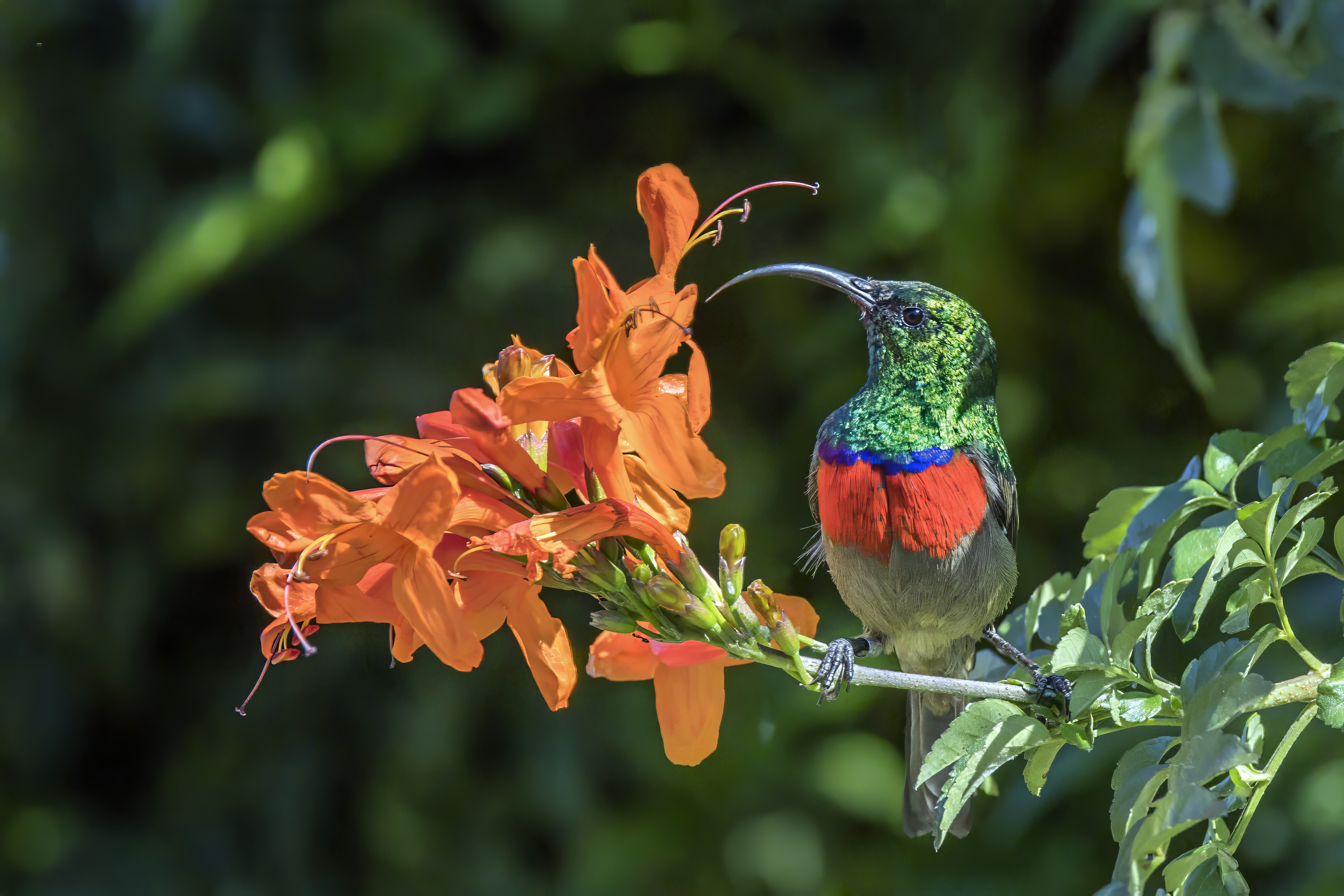
- Male at Mbombela, South Africa

Conservation status
- Least Concern (IUCN 3.1)

Scientific classification
- Kingdom: Animalia
- Phylum: Chordata
- Class: Aves
- Order: Passeriformes
- Family: Nectariniidae
- Genus: Cinnyris
- Species: C. afer

Binomial name
- Cinnyris afer (Linnaeus, 1766)
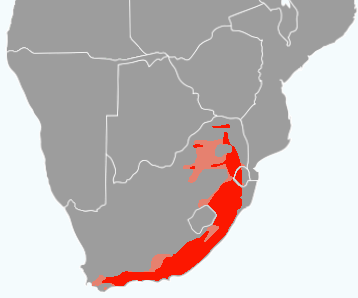
- range strongholds, occurring year-round lower density, passage or vagrancy

Synonyms
- Certhia afra Linnaeus, 1766; Nectarinia graueri; Nectarinia afra

= Greater double-collared sunbird =

Species of bird

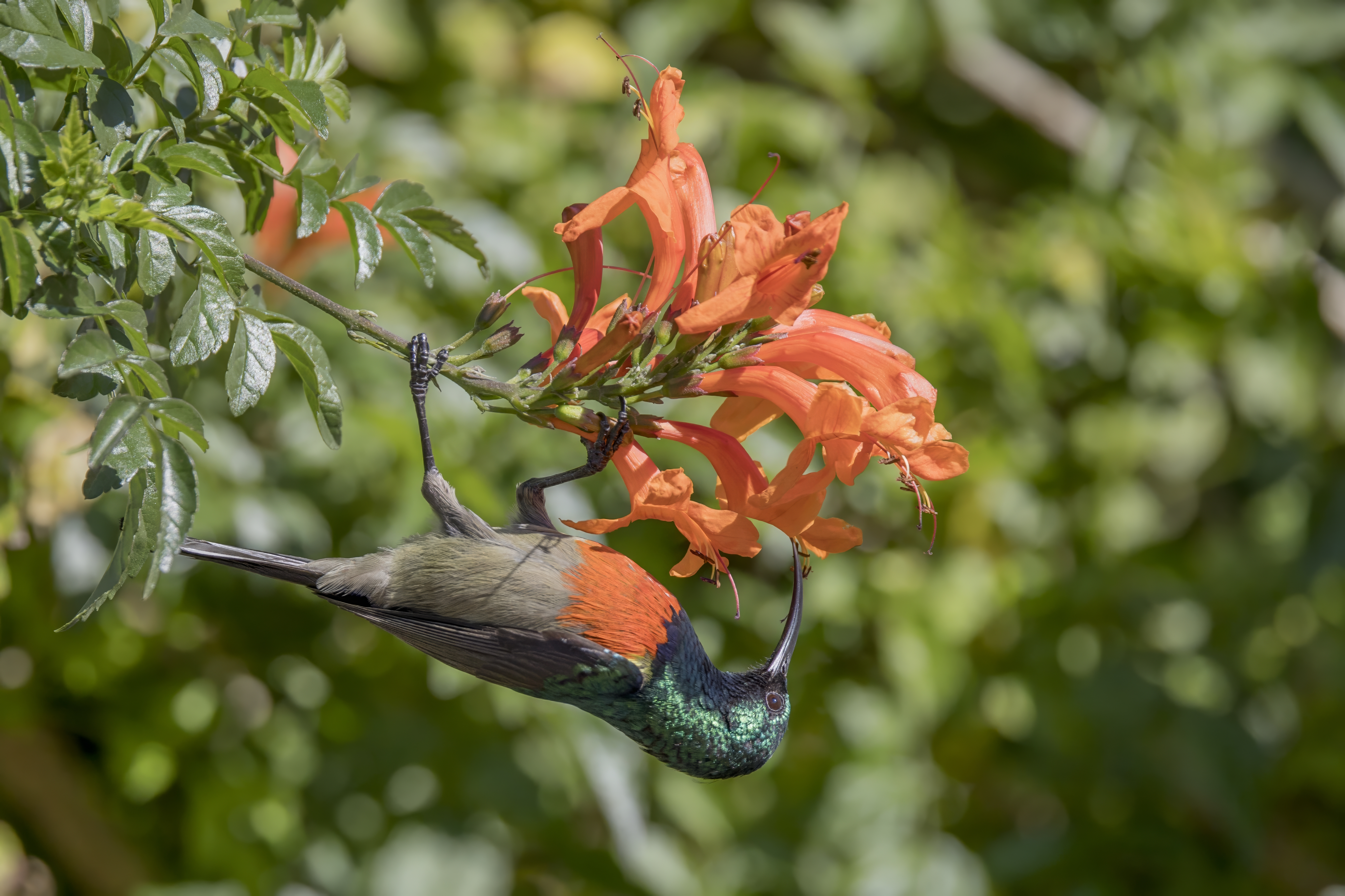
male feeding

The greater double-collared sunbird (Cinnyris afer) is a small bird in the sunbird family. It was formerly placed in genus Nectarinia.

== Distribution and habitat ==
The sunbird breeds in southern, eastern and northeastern South Africa and Eswatini. It is mainly resident, but partly migratory in the northeast of its range. It is common in gardens, fynbos, forest edges and coastal scrub.

== Description ==
This sunbird is 14 cm long and exhibits a clear sexual dimorphism. The adult male has a glossy, metallic green head, throat upper breast and back. It has a broad brilliant red band across the chest, separated from the green breast by a narrow metallic blue band. The rest of the underparts are pale grey. When displaying, yellow feather tufts can be seen on the shoulders. The plumage on the female is pale grey, darker in the wings. As with other sunbirds the bill is long and decurved. The bill, legs and feet are black. The eye is dark brown. The male can be distinguished from the similar lesser double-collared sunbird by the latter's smaller size, narrower red chest band and shorter bill. The call is a hard chut-chut-chut, and the song is a high pitched jumble of tweets and twitters, richer than the calls of the lesser double-collared sunbird.

== Behaviour ==
The sunbird is usually seen singly or in pairs. Its flight is fast and direct on short wings.

=== Breeding ===
The sunbird breeds all year round, with a peak from July to November. The closed oval nest is constructed from grass, lichen and other plant material, bound together with spider webs. It has a side entrance which sometimes has a porch, and is lined with feathers.

=== Feeding ===
It lives mainly on nectar from flowers, but takes some fruit, and, especially when feeding young, insects and spiders. It has the habit of hovering in front of webs to extract spiders. It can hover like a hummingbird to take nectar, but usually perches to do so.

=== Call ===
The greater double-collared Sunbird makes a shrill whistle and click: wrew wrew wrew ch ch.
