= Faurea recondita =

Conservation status
- Least Concern (IUCN 3.1)

Scientific classification
- Kingdom: Plantae
- Clade: Tracheophytes
- Clade: Angiosperms
- Clade: Eudicots
- Order: Proteales
- Family: Proteaceae
- Genus: Faurea
- Species: F. recondita

Binomial name
- Faurea recondita Rourke & V.R.Clark

Species of plant

Faurea recondita, also known as the Kamdeboo beechwood, is a tree that forms part of the genus Faurea. It occurs in the Kamdeboo Mountains. The species was only identified in 2013 after it was discovered in 2008. The tree grows on average two metres high. It has many similarities with Faurea coriacea found in Madagascar.
