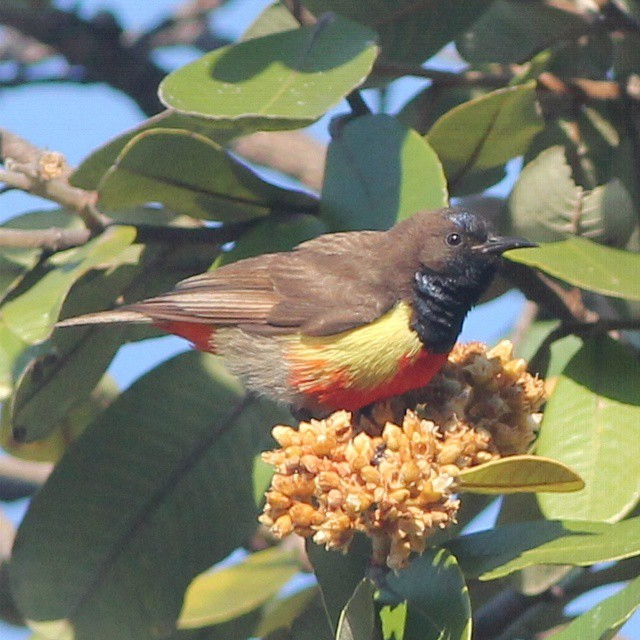
- In Cuchi, Angola

Conservation status
- Least Concern (IUCN 3.1)

Scientific classification
- Kingdom: Animalia
- Phylum: Chordata
- Class: Aves
- Order: Passeriformes
- Family: Nectariniidae
- Genus: Anthreptes
- Species: A. anchietae

Binomial name
- Anthreptes anchietae (Barboza du Bocage, 1878)

= Anchieta's sunbird =

Species of bird

Anchieta's sunbird (Anthreptes anchietae) is a species of bird in the family Nectariniidae. It is found in Angola, the DRC, Malawi, Mozambique, Tanzania, and Zambia, and is named after José Alberto de Oliveira Anchieta.

== Description ==
Anchieta's sunbird is a small bird, about 10–12 cm (3.9–4.7 in) long and weighing around 8 grams (0.28 oz). The male has dark iridescent blue on the forehead, crown, chin, and upper breast. Its wings and tail are brown. The side of the breast is bright yellow, and the central breast to the upper belly is bright orangey-red. The rest of the underparts are greyish-brown, while the bill and legs are black. The female is similar but has only blue on the forehead. Her chin and throat are brown with blue tips, and her breast is a dull yellow.

== Population ==
Anchieta's sunbird is monotypic. The population of the species is stable, meaning it does not meet the conditions to be considered at risk of becoming vulnerable. This species is classified as "Least Concern" in regard to being globally threatened.

== Distribution and habitat ==
Anchieta's sunbird lives in Brachystegia and areas of degraded woodland, where they favor rocky zones Anchieta's sunbird is found across several countries in sub-Saharan Africa, including Angola, the Democratic Republic of the Congo, Malawi, Mozambique, Tanzania, and Zambia. The bird's adaptability to various altitudes and ecosystems allows it to thrive in both dry and wetter regions. The Anchieta Sunbird is usually not found in Zambia during the rainy season from November to April. This is because heavy rainfall affects the availability of flowering plants that are crucial for the bird's nectar-based diet. As a result, the sunbird may move to drier areas with more food to survive during these tough conditions.

== Diet ==
Anchieta's sunbirds have a specialized diet. They eat nectar from different flowering plants. They also eat small insects and fruits, which give them the protein and nutrients they need. In Africa, sunbirds are the dominant pollinator. This dual diet of nectar and insects means they play a significant role in pollination and controlling insect populations.

== Reproduction ==
Anchieta aunbirds have specific breeding seasons in Tanzania, Malawi, and Zambia. Their nests are made of flowers, seeds, and twigs, lined with soft fluff from the Faurea saligna plant. The nests are carefully placed up to 6.5 metres (21 ft) above the ground in bushes or trees. The eggs of Anchieta's sunbird have a blue-white or grey color and markings of black and grey.

== Vocalization ==
Anchieta's sunbirds are vocal birds that utter complex calls and songs, which are essential in their communication. They make calls such as "tseu-werr", "tsoo-wit", "tser-wit-tsui-tsi", "chip-choo-chip". These may be repeated from one to 40 times. They also make simple calls: "twi-tsui-tsi-twi" or ascending notes like "tzer-chip-chip-chip" up to 20 repetitions. They make these sounds as part of interaction with their mates and other rivals as they seek to establish their ground.

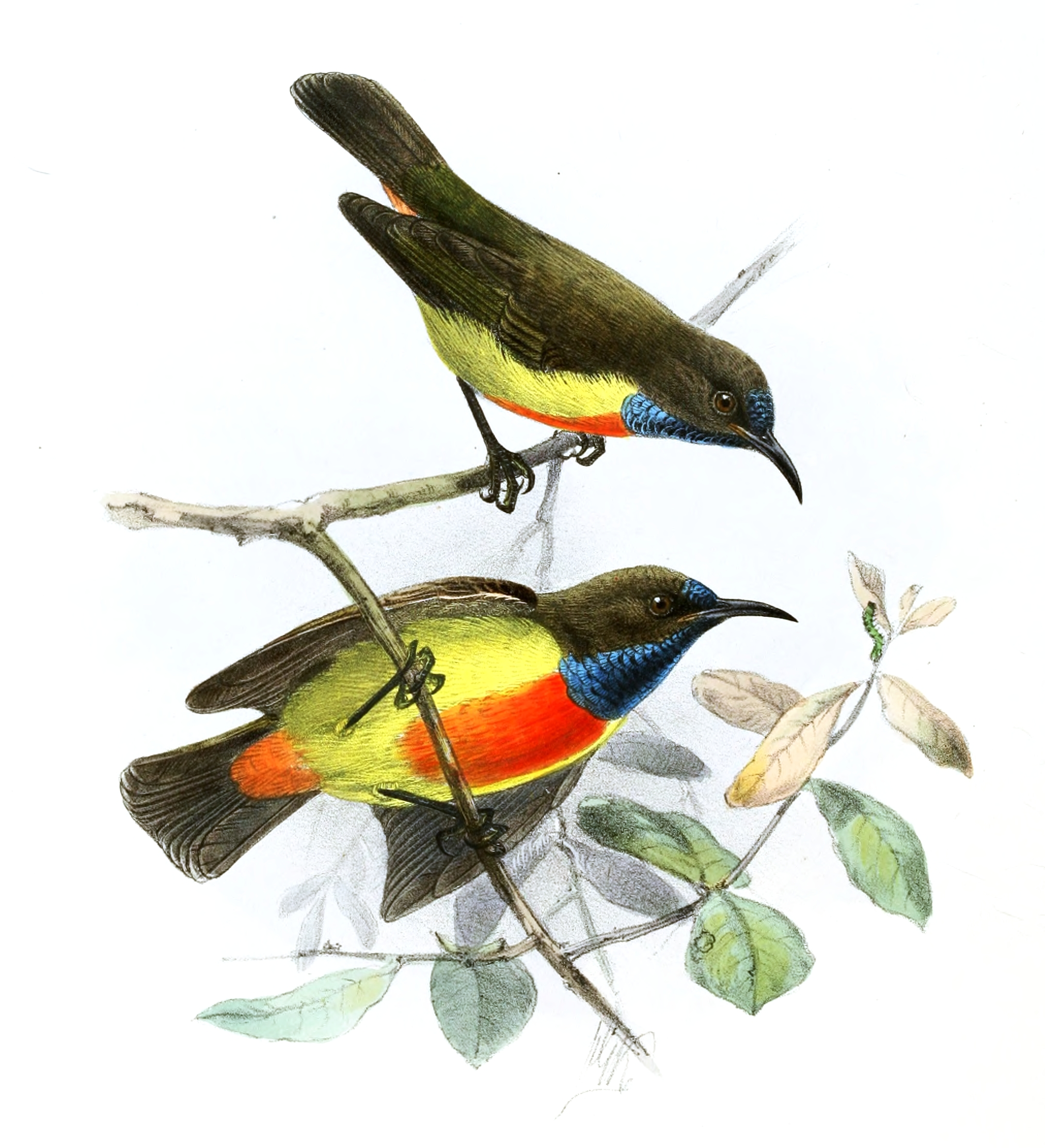
Illustration by Keulemans
