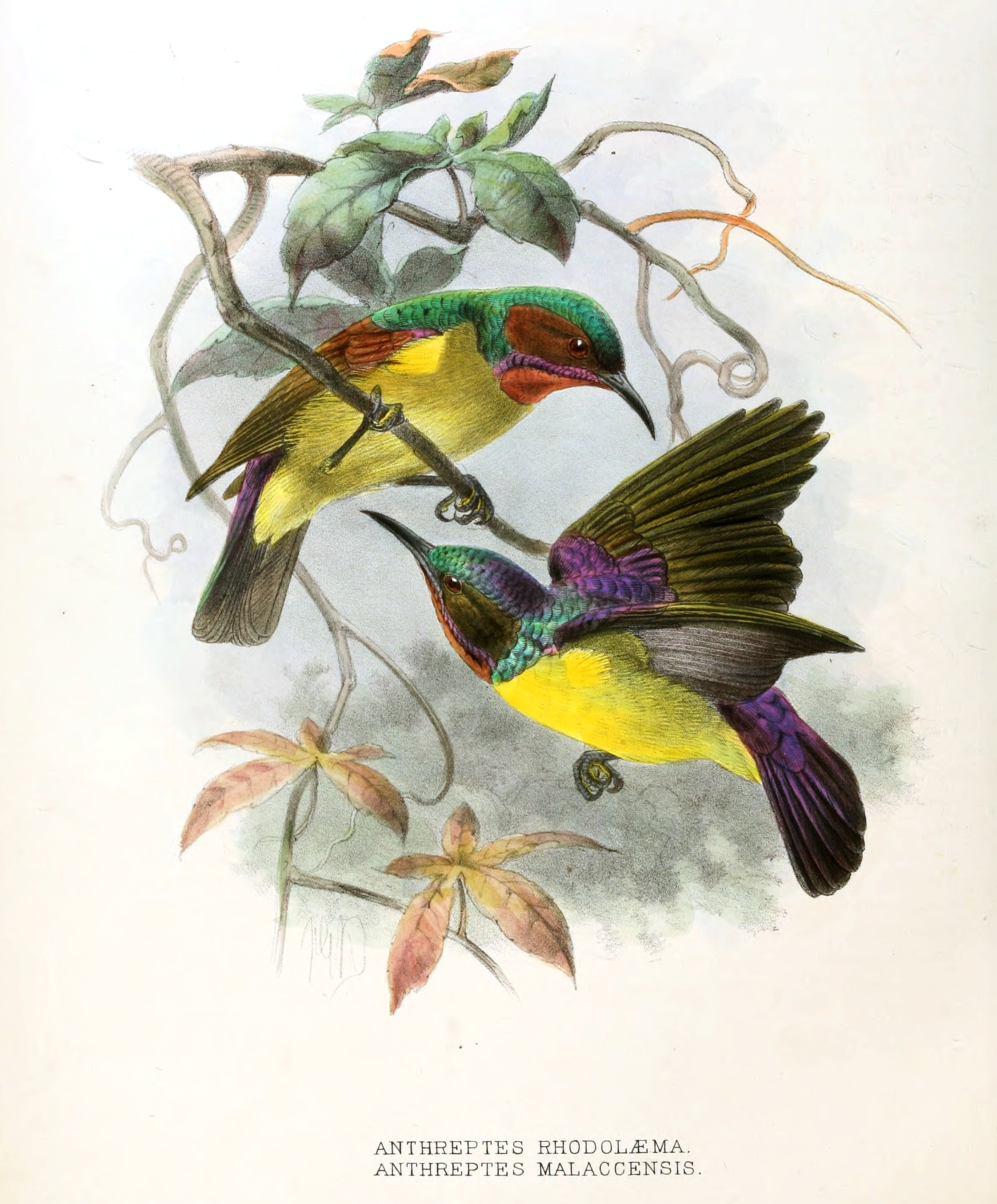
- Anthreptes rhodolaemus (upper image) with Anthreptes malacensis

Conservation status
- Near Threatened (IUCN 3.1)

Scientific classification
- Kingdom: Animalia
- Phylum: Chordata
- Class: Aves
- Order: Passeriformes
- Family: Nectariniidae
- Genus: Anthreptes
- Species: A. rhodolaemus

Binomial name
- Anthreptes rhodolaemus Shelley, 1878

= Red-throated sunbird =

Species of bird

The red-throated sunbird (Anthreptes rhodolaemus) is a species of bird in the family Nectariniidae. It is found in Brunei, Indonesia, Malaysia, Myanmar, the Philippines, Singapore, and Thailand. Its natural habitat is subtropical or tropical moist lowland forests. It is threatened by habitat loss.

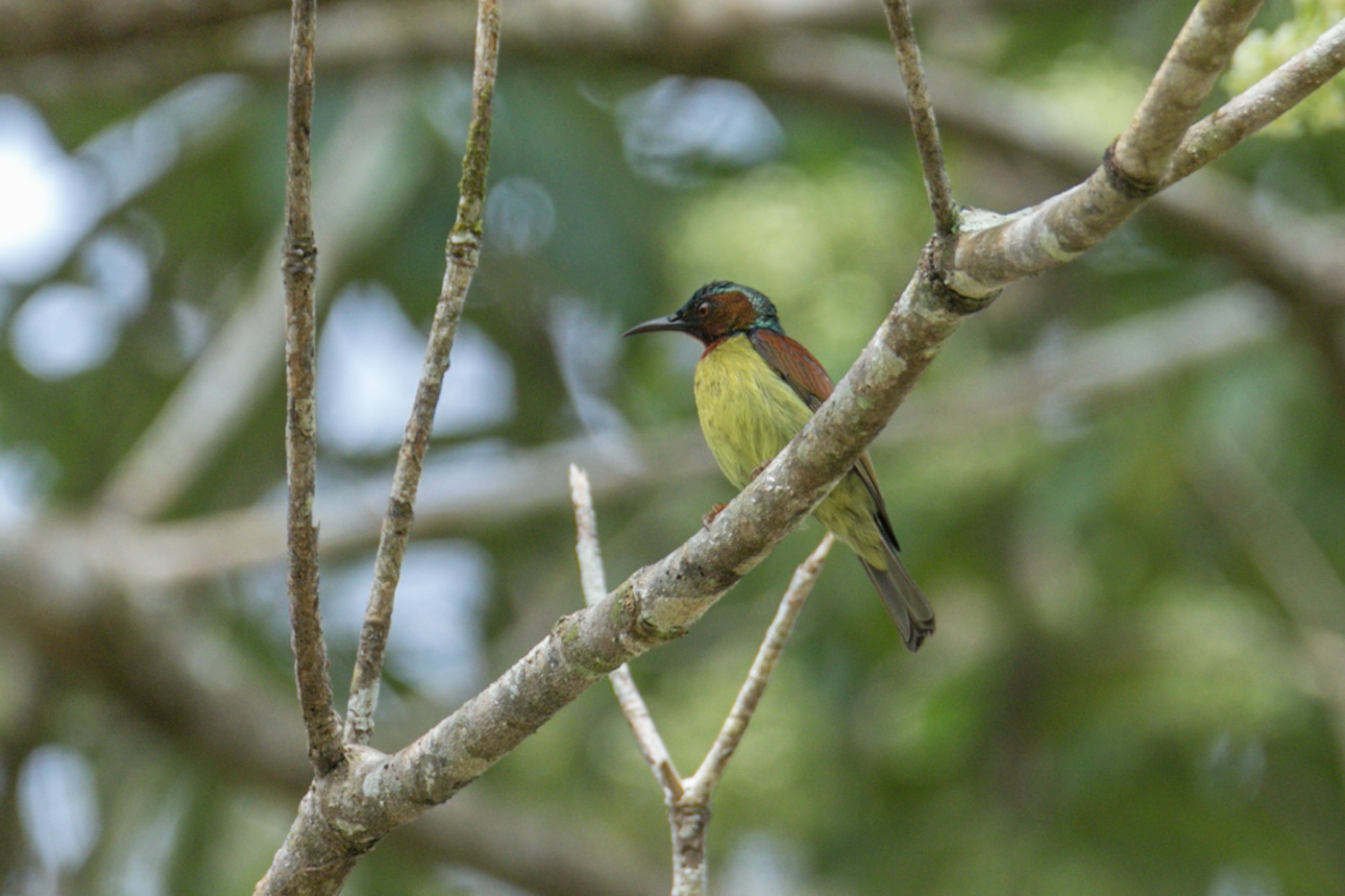
