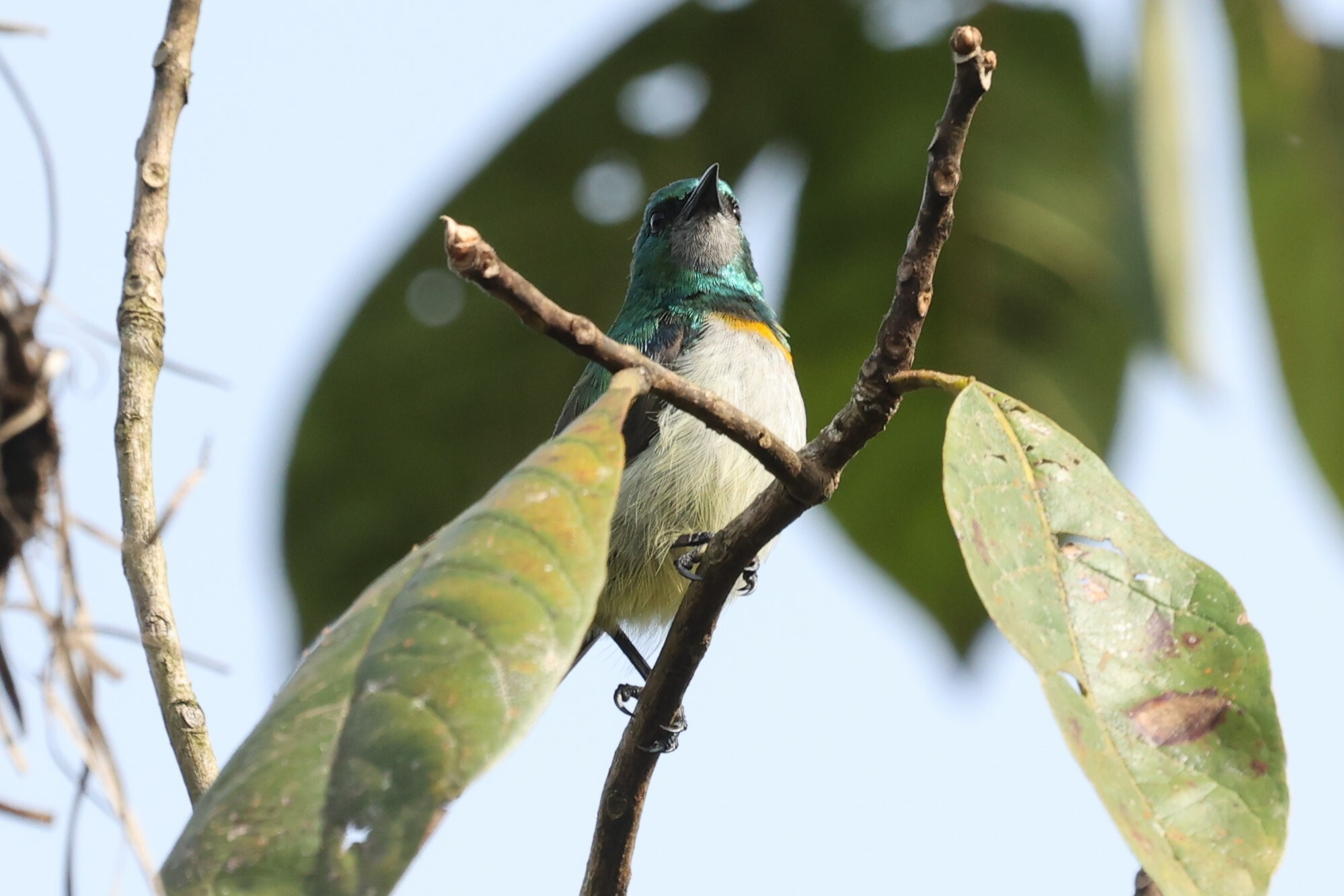
- male

Conservation status
- Least Concern (IUCN 3.1)

Scientific classification
- Kingdom: Animalia
- Phylum: Chordata
- Class: Aves
- Order: Passeriformes
- Family: Nectariniidae
- Genus: Anthreptes
- Species: A. tephrolaemus

Binomial name
- Anthreptes tephrolaemus (Jardine & Fraser, 1852)

= Grey-chinned sunbird =

Species of bird

The grey-chinned sunbird (Anthreptes tephrolaemus) is a species of bird in the family Nectariniidae. It is found throughout the African tropical rainforest, east of the Dahomey Gap. The yellow-chinned sunbird (Anthreptes rectirostris), was formerly grouped with this species.
