= Faurea arborea =

Scientific classification
- Kingdom: Plantae
- Clade: Tracheophytes
- Clade: Angiosperms
- Clade: Eudicots
- Order: Proteales
- Family: Proteaceae
- Genus: Faurea
- Species: F. arborea

Binomial name
- Faurea arborea Engl.

Species of tree native to East Africa

Faurea arborea is a species of tree of the genus Faurea. It is native to East Africa, and was described by Adolf Engler in 1894.
