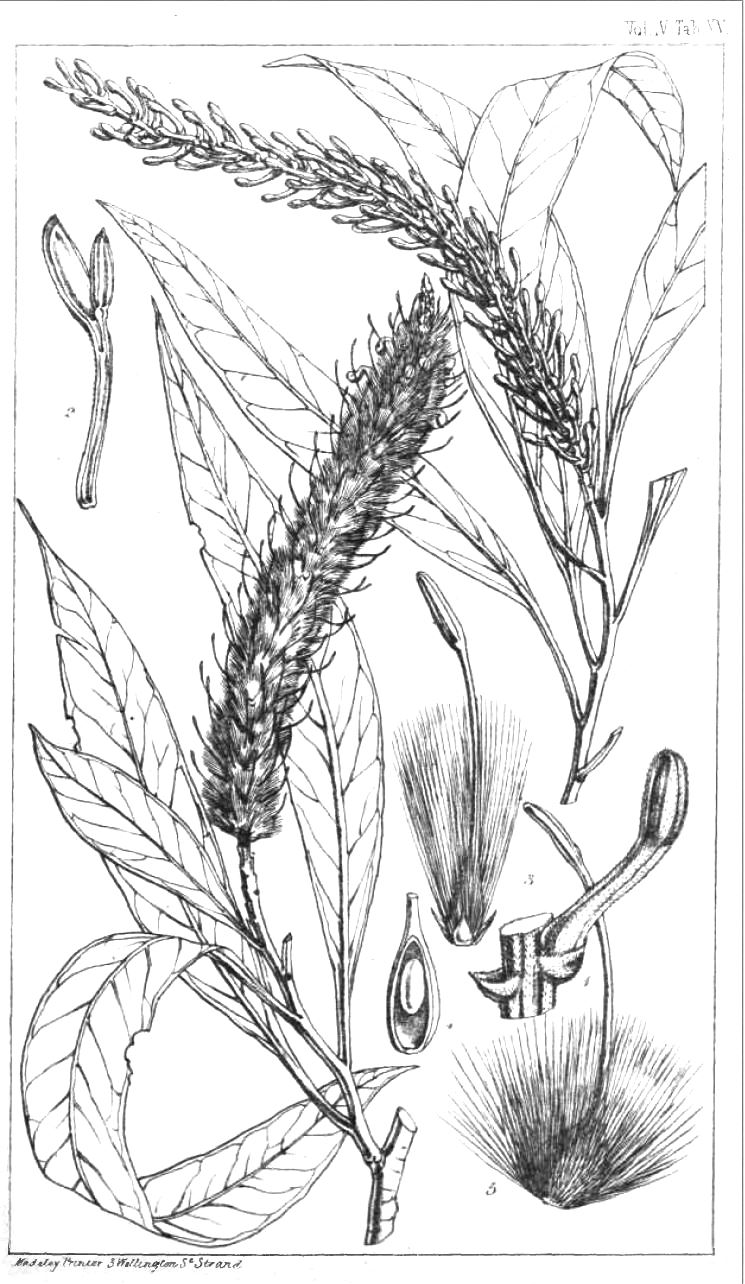
- F. saligna, illustration of spike with flower buds, and the infrutescence

Scientific classification
- Kingdom: Plantae
- Clade: Tracheophytes
- Clade: Angiosperms
- Clade: Eudicots
- Order: Proteales
- Family: Proteaceae
- Subfamily: Proteoideae
- Tribe: Proteeae
- Genus: Faurea; Harv.

Species
- See text

Synonyms
- Trichostachys Welw.

= Faurea =

Genus of flowering plants

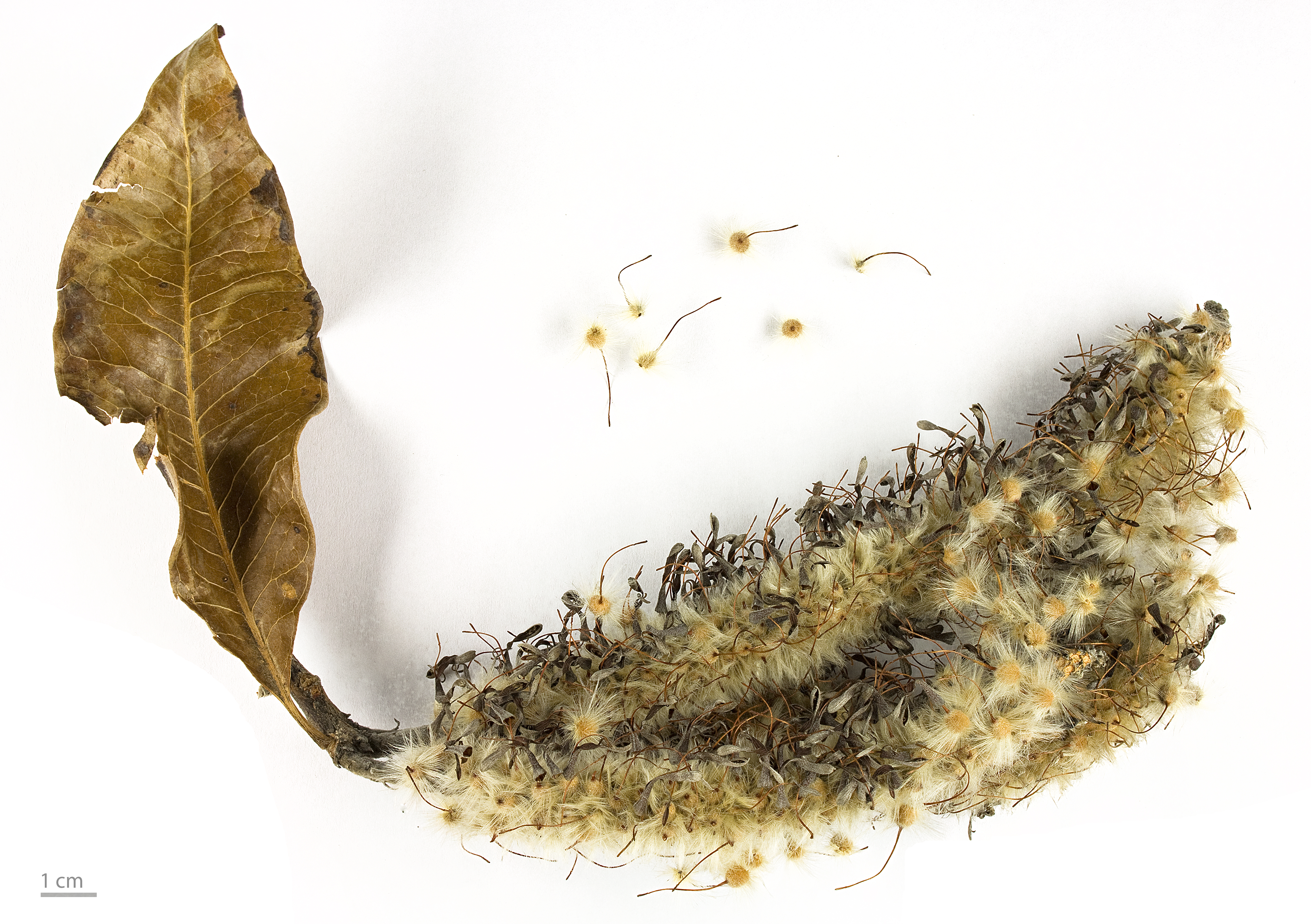
Faurea rochetiana - MHNT

Faurea is a genus containing 16 species of flowering plants in the protea family which occur in the summer rainfall area of southern Africa, extending to tropical Africa and Madagascar. The name honours South African soldier and botanist William Caldwell Faure (1822–1844) who was killed on active service in India.

== Species ==
Described species are:

- Faurea arborea Engl.
- Faurea argentea Hutch.
- Faurea coriacea Marner
- Faurea delevoyi De Wild.
- Faurea discolor Welw.
- Faurea forficuliflora Baker
- Faurea galpinii E.Phillips
- Faurea intermedia Engl. & Gilg
- Faurea lucida De Wild.
- Faurea macnaughtonii E.Phillips
- Faurea racemosa Farmar
- Faurea recondita Rourke & V.R.Clark
- Faurea rochetiana (A.Rich.) Chiov. ex Pic.Serm.
- Faurea rubriflora Marner
- Faurea saligna Harv.
- Faurea wentzeliana Engl.
