= Faurea delevoyi =

Conservation status
- Least Concern (IUCN 2.3)

Scientific classification
- Kingdom: Plantae
- Clade: Tracheophytes
- Clade: Angiosperms
- Clade: Eudicots
- Order: Proteales
- Family: Proteaceae
- Genus: Faurea
- Species: F. delevoyi

Binomial name
- Faurea delevoyi De Wild., (1924)

Synonyms
- Faurea saligna var. platyphylla Hiern

Species of flowering plant

Faurea delevoyi is a tree that forms part of Faurea (the beech trees) genus and is native to Angola, Democratic Republic of the Congo, Malawi, Mozambique, Tanzania, Zambia and Zimbabwe.
