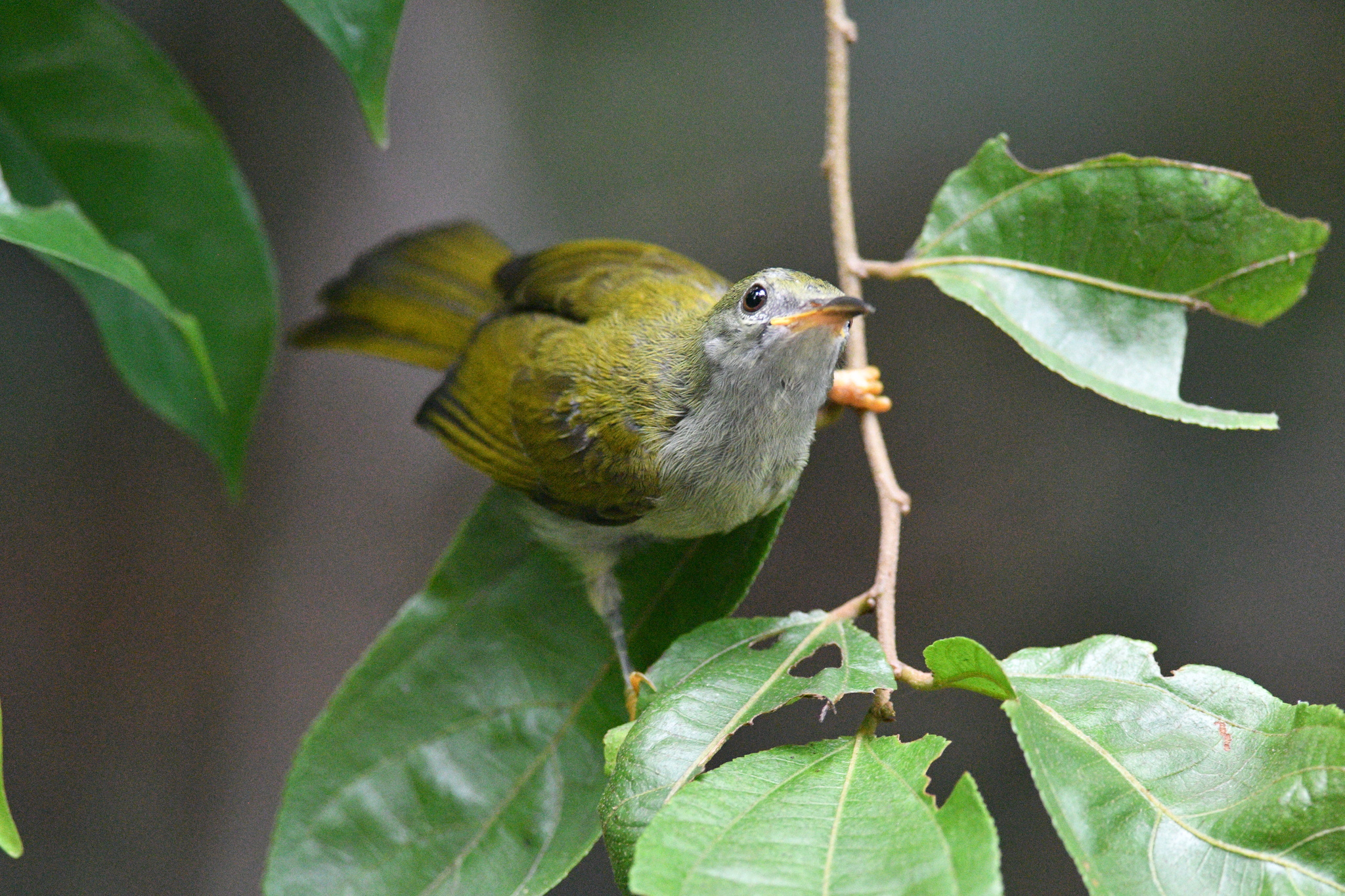

Conservation status
- Least Concern (IUCN 3.1)

Scientific classification
- Kingdom: Animalia
- Phylum: Chordata
- Class: Aves
- Order: Passeriformes
- Family: Nectariniidae
- Genus: Anthreptes
- Species: A. simplex

Binomial name
- Anthreptes simplex (Müller, 1843)

= Plain sunbird =

Species of bird

The plain sunbird (Anthreptes simplex) is a species of bird in the family Nectariniidae. It is found in Brunei, Indonesia, Malaysia, Myanmar, Singapore, and Thailand. Its natural habitats are subtropical or tropical moist lowland forests and subtropical or tropical mangrove forests.

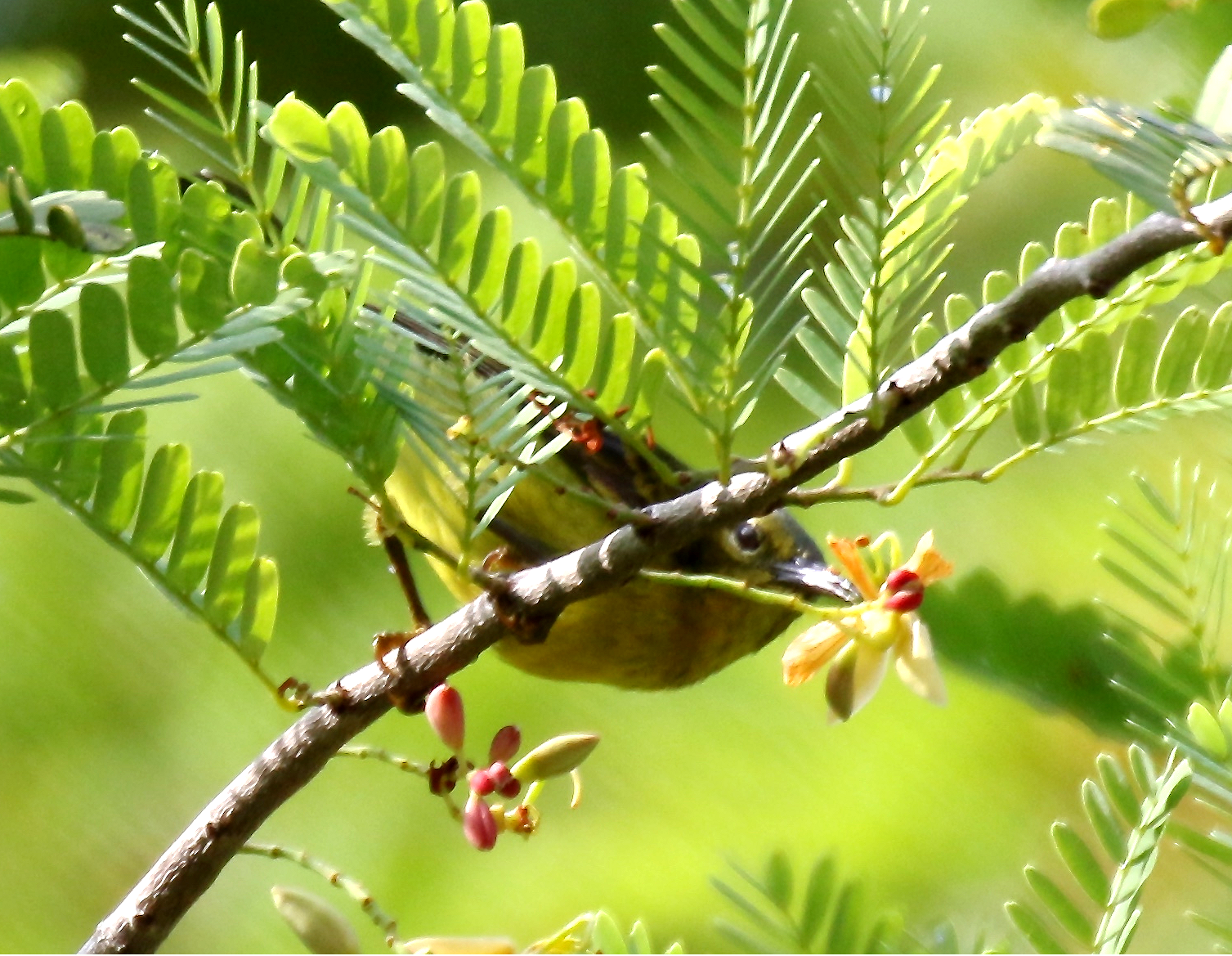
Kota Kinabalu - Sabah, Borneo - Malaysia
