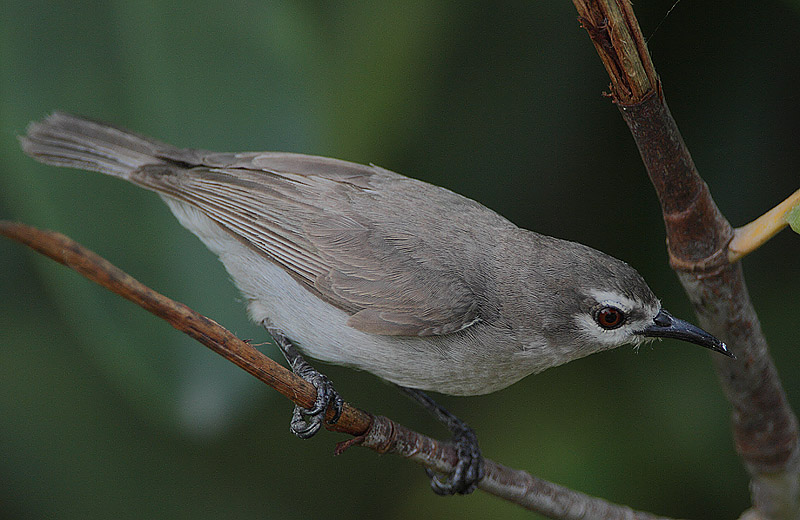

Conservation status
- Least Concern (IUCN 3.1)

Scientific classification
- Kingdom: Animalia
- Phylum: Chordata
- Class: Aves
- Order: Passeriformes
- Family: Nectariniidae
- Genus: Anthreptes
- Species: A. gabonicus

Binomial name
- Anthreptes gabonicus (Hartlaub, 1861)

= Mangrove sunbird =

Species of bird

The mangrove sunbird (Anthreptes gabonicus) or mouse-brown sunbird, is a species of bird in the family Nectariniidae. Its range covers areas near the Gulf of Guinea (on either side of the Dahomey Gap), from Senegal to northwestern Angola.

Its natural habitat is subtropical or tropical mangrove forests.
