= Faurea lucida =

Conservation status
- Critically Endangered (IUCN 3.1)

Scientific classification
- Kingdom: Plantae
- Clade: Tracheophytes
- Clade: Angiosperms
- Clade: Eudicots
- Order: Proteales
- Family: Proteaceae
- Genus: Faurea
- Species: F. lucida

Binomial name
- Faurea lucida De Wild.

Species of tree

Faurea lucida is a tree that forms part of the Faurea genus and is endemic to the Democratic Republic of the Congo.

== Sources ==
- Plants of the World Online
