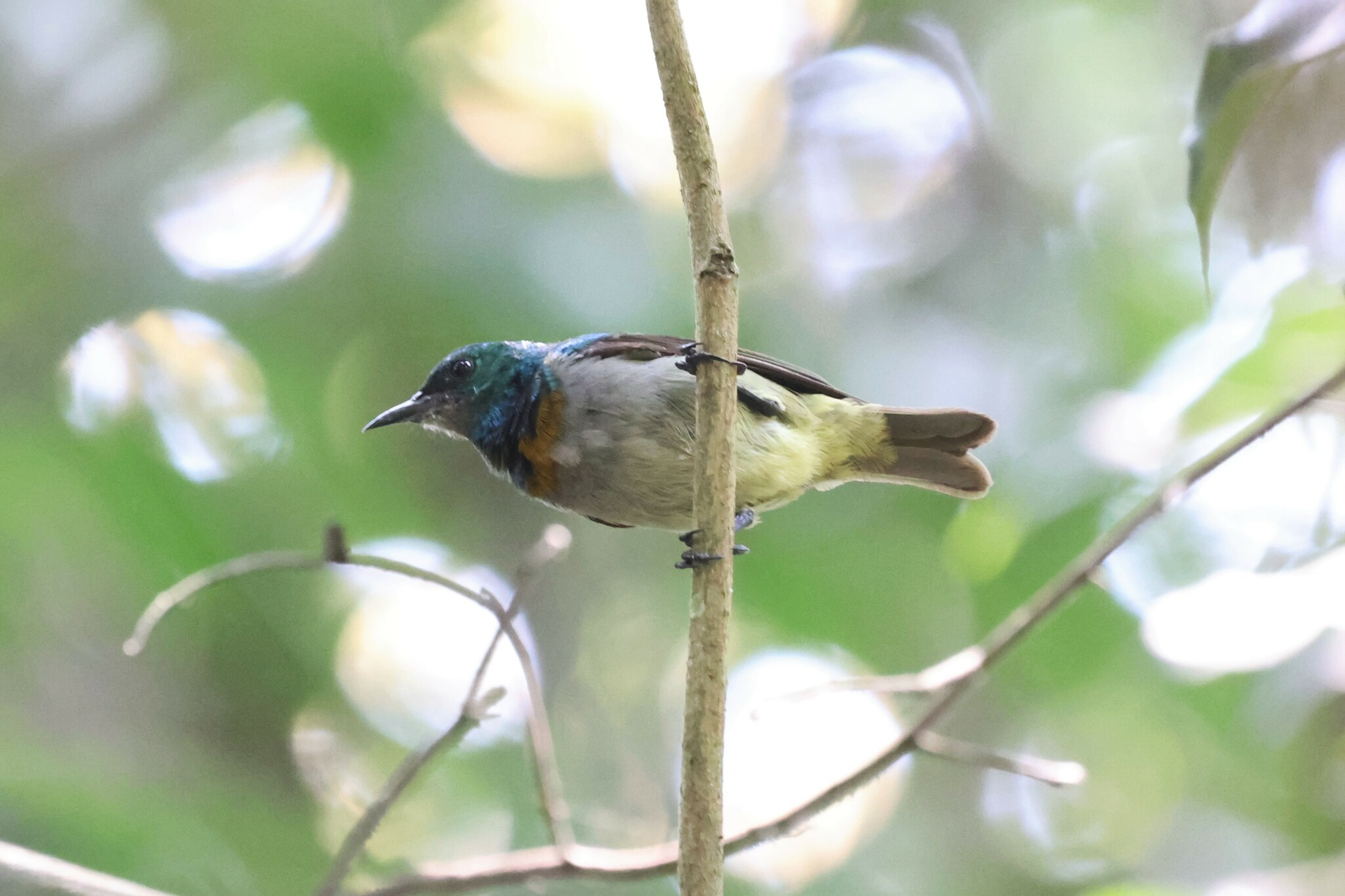
- Male
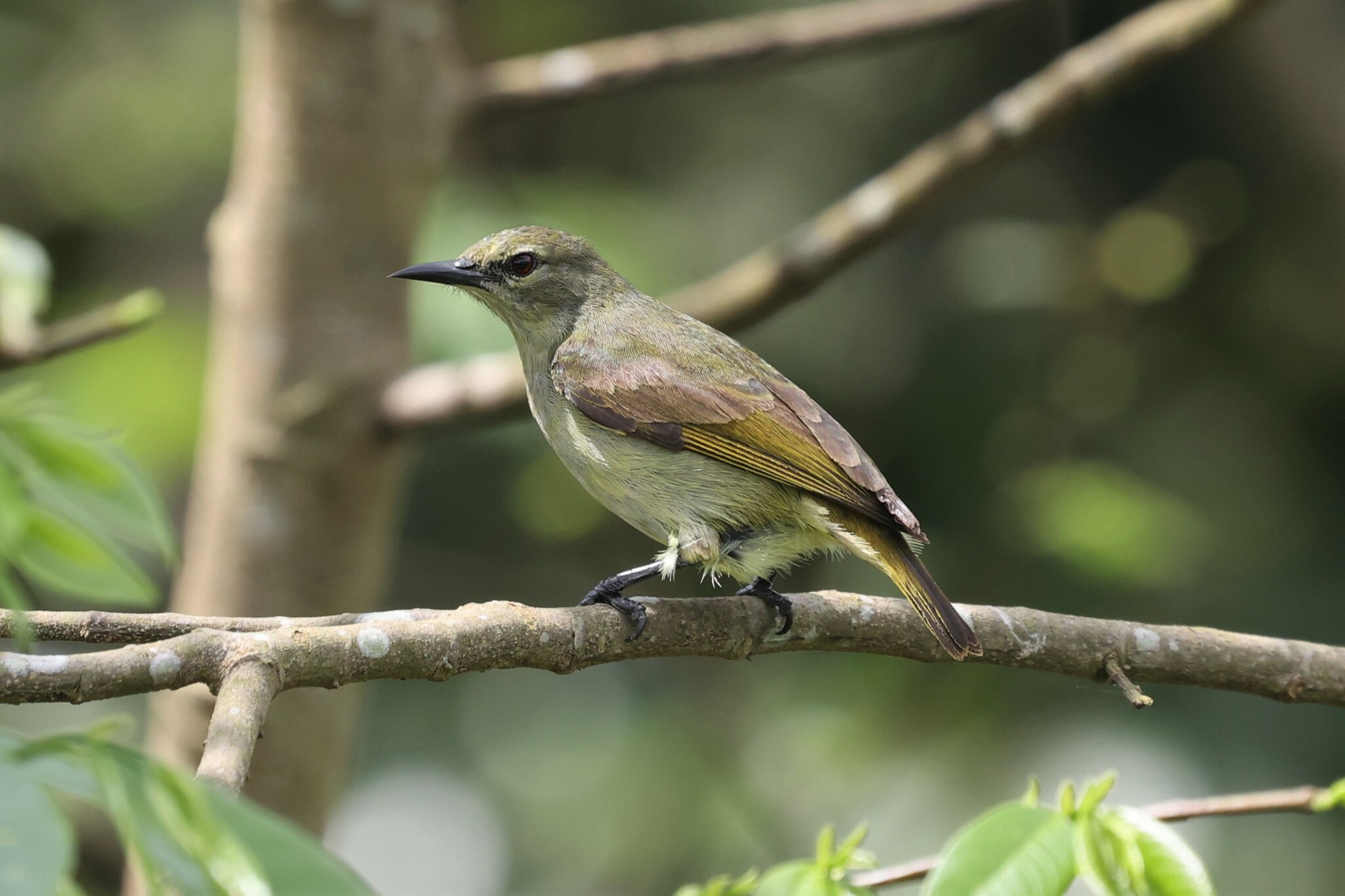
- Female

Conservation status
- Least Concern (IUCN 3.1)

Scientific classification
- Kingdom: Animalia
- Phylum: Chordata
- Class: Aves
- Order: Passeriformes
- Family: Nectariniidae
- Genus: Anthreptes
- Species: A. rectirostris

Binomial name
- Anthreptes rectirostris (Shaw, 1812)

= Yellow-chinned sunbird =

Species of bird

The yellow-chinned sunbird (Anthreptes rectirostris) is a species of bird in the family Nectariniidae. It is found in West Africa, namely Sierra Leone to Ghana. The grey-chinned sunbird (Anthreptes tephrolaemus) was formerly grouped with this species.
