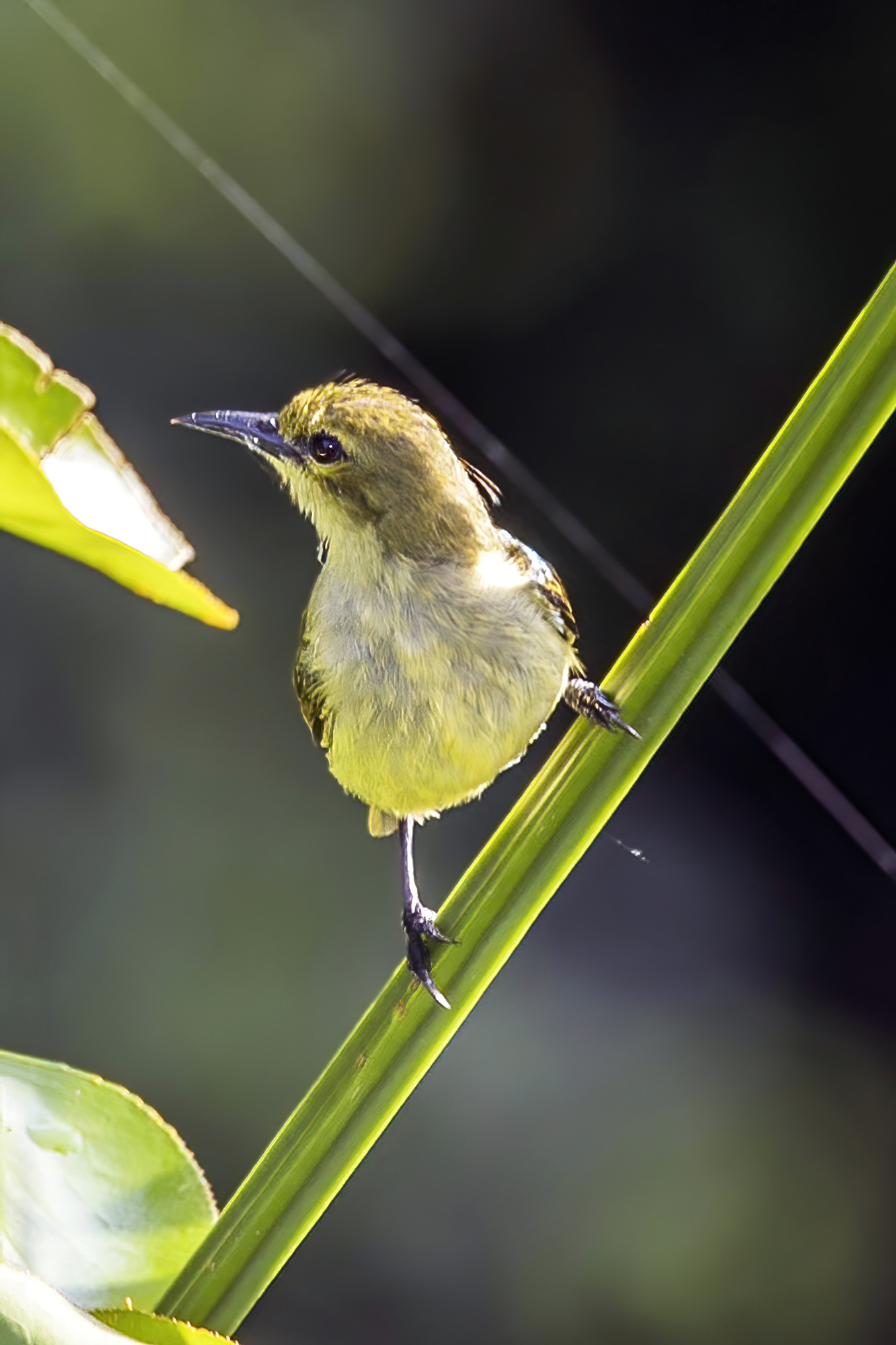
- A. s. kruensis Ghana

Conservation status
- Least Concern (IUCN 3.1)

Scientific classification
- Kingdom: Animalia
- Phylum: Chordata
- Class: Aves
- Order: Passeriformes
- Family: Nectariniidae
- Genus: Anthreptes
- Species: A. seimundi

Binomial name
- Anthreptes seimundi (Ogilvie-Grant, 1908)

Synonyms
- Nectarinia seimundi

= Little green sunbird =

Species of bird

The little green sunbird (Anthreptes seimundi), also called Seimund's sunbird, is a species of bird in the family Nectariniidae. It is sometimes placed in the genus Nectarinia. It is widespread throughout the African tropical rainforest.

== Description ==
The little green sunbird is small, light yellow, and warbler-like; overall similar to the Bates's sunbird. It is 9 cm (about 3.5 inches) long. The beak is slightly curved and has a small amount of pink. Around the eye is a pale ring. Its cry is high pitched.

== Name ==
The little green sunbird's binomial classification Anthreptes seimundi comes from its genus and Eibert Carl Henry Seimund, a British Taxidermist.

== Subspecies ==
- A. s. seimundi: Bioko (Gulf of Guinea)
- A. s. kruensis: Guinea and Sierra Leone to Ghana and Togo.
- A. s. minor: southern Nigeria and southern Cameroon east to Central African Republic, southern South Sudan, Uganda, and Rwanda, south to northern Angola and central Democratic Republic of the Congo.

== Gallery ==
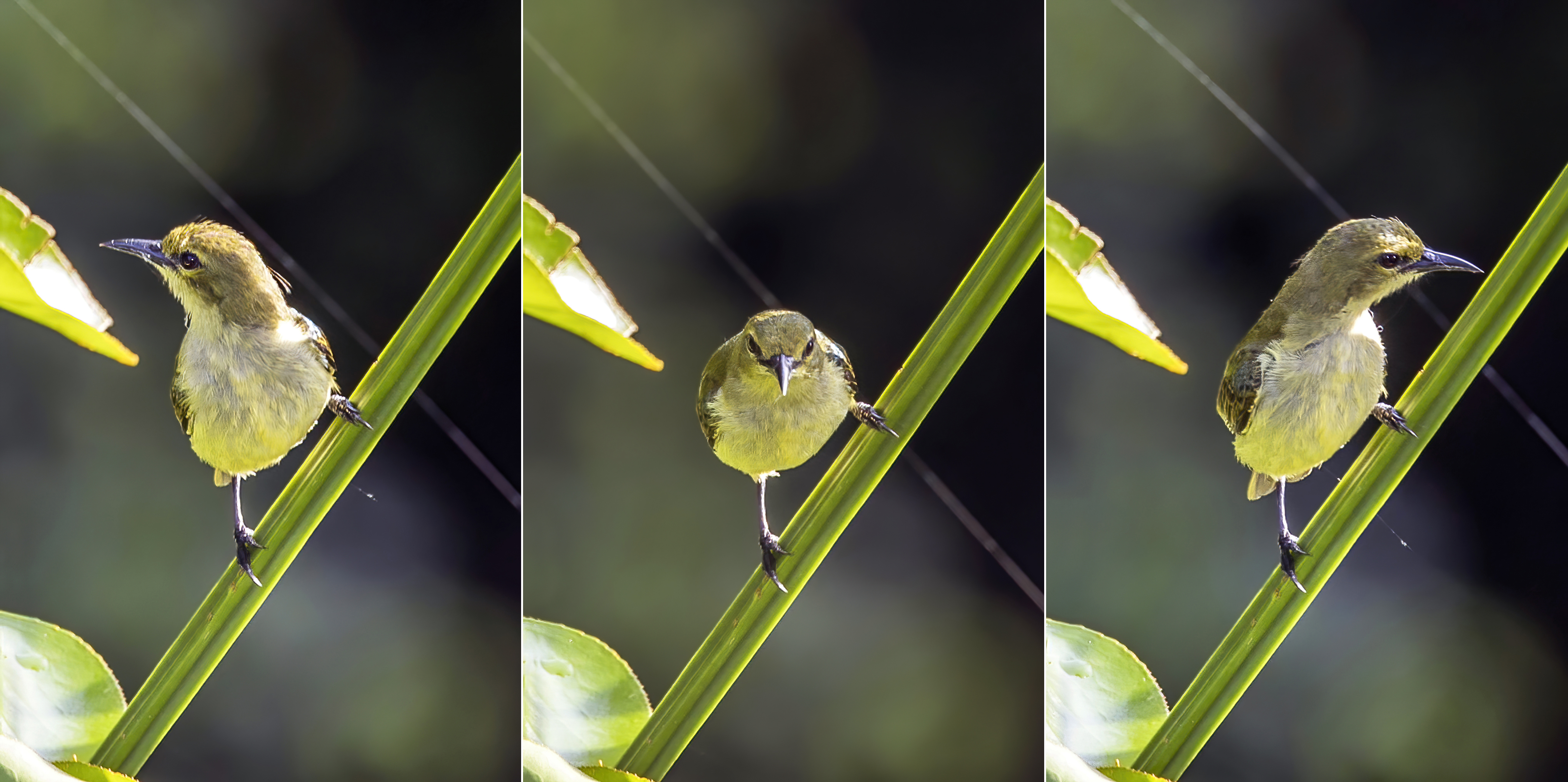
Little green sunbird (A. s. kruensis) composite
