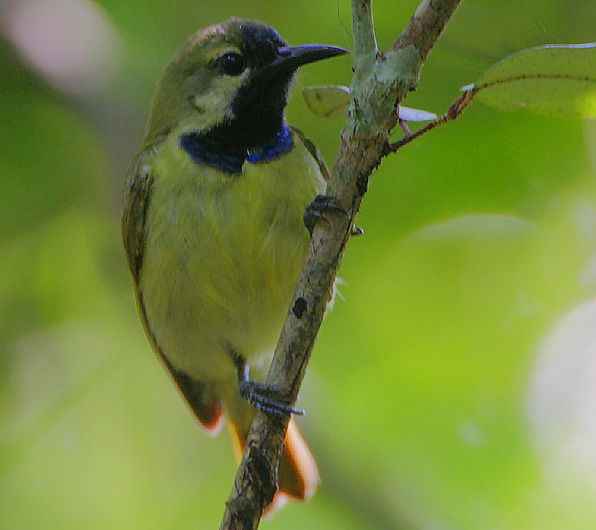

Conservation status
- Near Threatened (IUCN 3.1)

Scientific classification
- Kingdom: Animalia
- Phylum: Chordata
- Class: Aves
- Order: Passeriformes
- Family: Nectariniidae
- Genus: Anthreptes
- Species: A. reichenowi

Binomial name
- Anthreptes reichenowi Gunning, 1909

= Plain-backed sunbird =

Species of bird

The plain-backed sunbird, also known as blue-throated sunbird (Anthreptes reichenowi) is a sunbird. The sunbirds are a group of very small Old World passerine birds which feed largely on nectar, although they will also take insects, especially when feeding young. Flight is fast and direct on their short wings. Most species can take nectar by hovering like a hummingbird, but usually perch to feed most of the time.

The plain-backed sunbird has a disjunct distribution, with one subpopulation in the coastal lowlands of Kenya and north-eastern Tanzania, and another in Mozambique and Zimbabwe. It may be at risk from clearance of lowland forest throughout its range.
