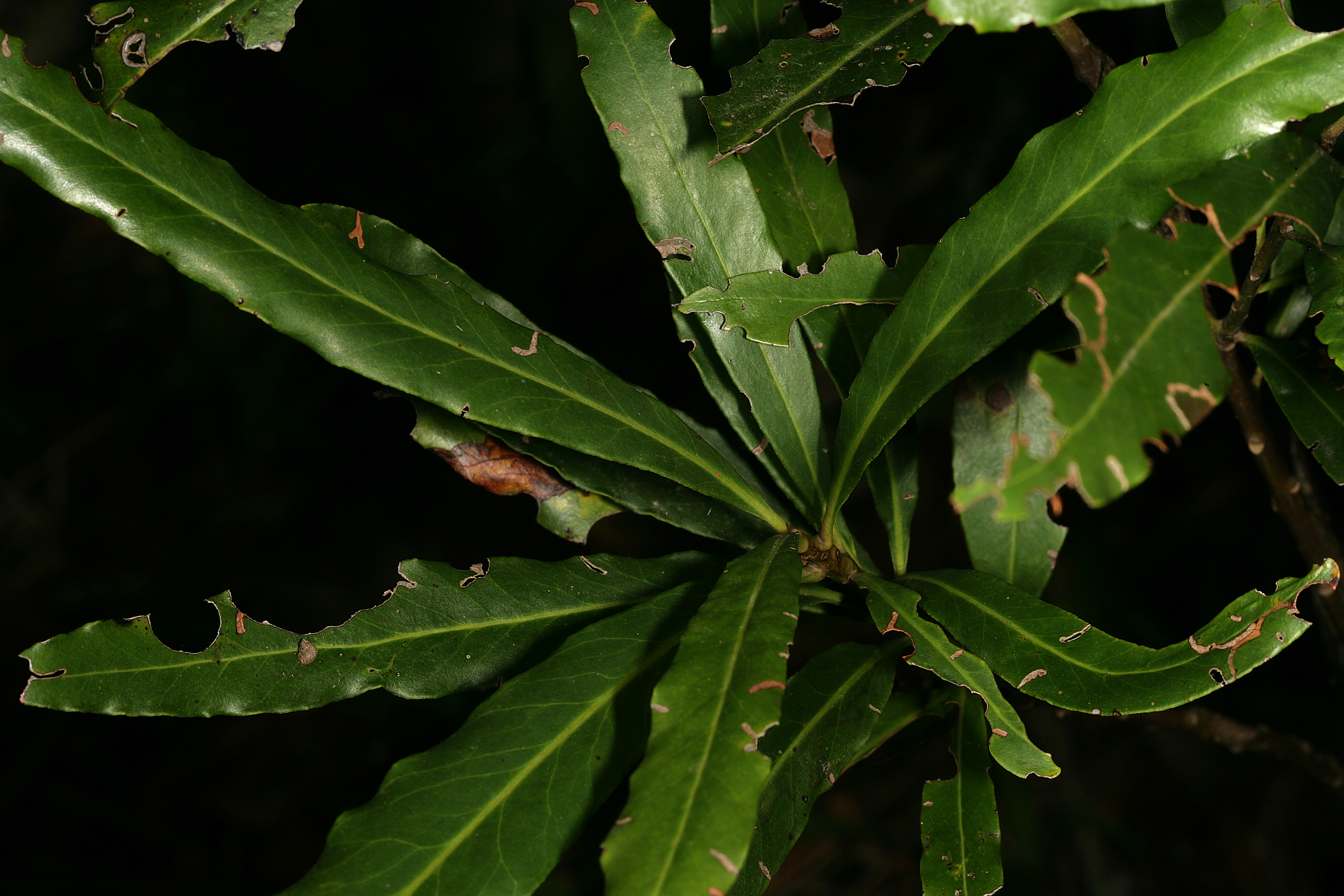

Conservation status
- Least Concern (IUCN 3.1)

Scientific classification
- Kingdom: Plantae
- Clade: Embryophytes
- Clade: Tracheophytes
- Clade: Angiosperms
- Clade: Eudicots
- Order: Proteales
- Family: Proteaceae
- Genus: Faurea
- Species: F. macnaughtonii

Binomial name
- Faurea macnaughtonii E.Phillips

Synonyms
- Faurea natalensis E.Phillips

= Faurea macnaughtonii =

Species of tree found in southern Africa

Faurea macnaughtonii (Terblans beech) is a species of tree in the family Proteaceae. It is found in South Africa and Eswatini, and was named in honour of Colin B. MacNaughton, Conservator of Forests at Knysna during the 1890s.
