= Faurea intermedia =

Conservation status
- Least Concern (IUCN 2.3)

Scientific classification
- Kingdom: Plantae
- Clade: Tracheophytes
- Clade: Angiosperms
- Clade: Eudicots
- Order: Proteales
- Family: Proteaceae
- Genus: Faurea
- Species: F. intermedia

Binomial name
- Faurea intermedia Engl. & Gilg, (1903)

Synonyms
- Faurea intermedia var. katangensis De Wild.

Species of flowering plant

Faurea intermedia is a tree that forms part of Faurea genus and is native to Angola, Democratic Republic of the Congo, Tanzania and Zambia.
