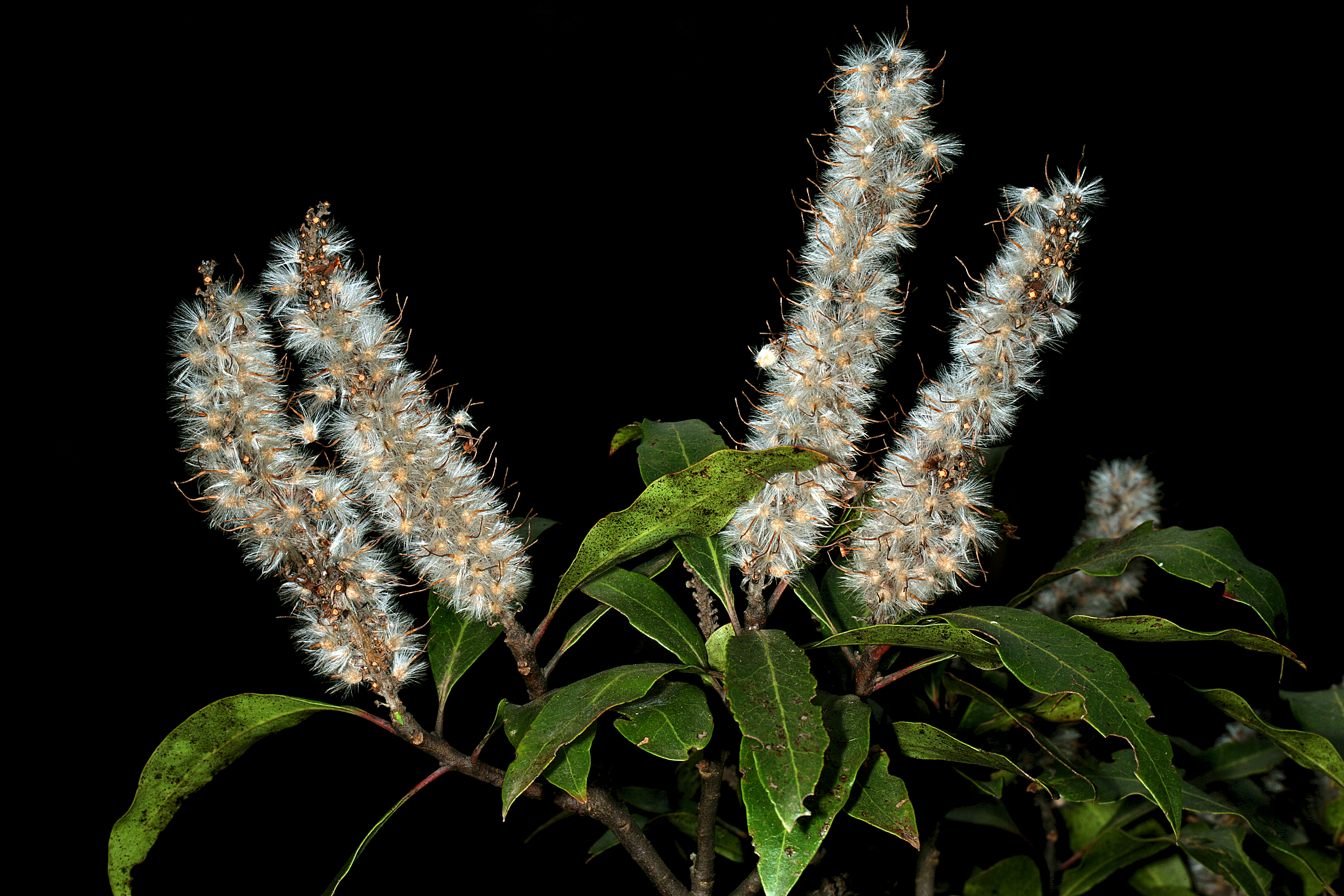

Conservation status
- Least Concern (IUCN 3.1)

Scientific classification
- Kingdom: Plantae
- Clade: Tracheophytes
- Clade: Angiosperms
- Clade: Eudicots
- Order: Proteales
- Family: Proteaceae
- Genus: Faurea
- Species: F. galpinii

Binomial name
- Faurea galpinii E.Phillips

= Faurea galpinii =

Species of tree

Faurea galpinii is a small tree that grows to 10 m (20 ft.) tall, but its trunks will vary depending on growing conditions. The leaves of F. galpinii are alternately lanceolate with wavy margins. When growing in the forest, the bark appears grey with smooth, concentric rings, although it can appear rough and dark under exposed conditions, and the variety Faurea gal pinii varies in size from 1 to 2 m (3 ft 3 in to 6 ft 7 in).

The petiole is about 10 mm long, the new leaves are typically red and dark green with a leathery appearance. The flowers are greenish – white and short and stalked; the inflorescence is covered with gray velvety hairs. One of the most striking features that distinguishes Faurea galpinii from other species in its genus is the large number of white flowers on the underside of its leaves.

The flowering period is in the summer months from October to January, and the flowers are followed by the appearance of whitish hairs – covered nuts that usually decorate the tree from November to April.
