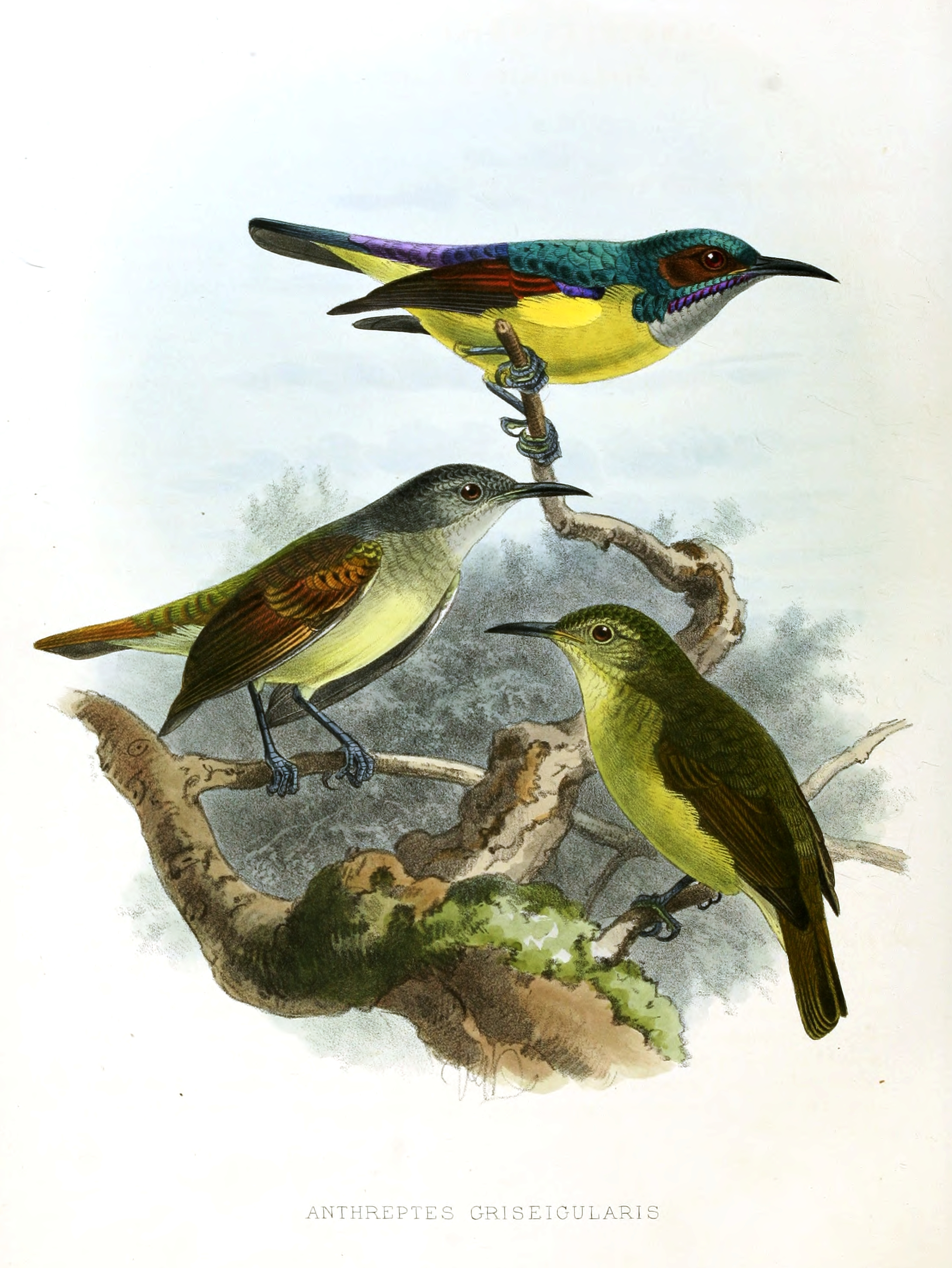
- An illustration of a male (top) and females (bottom)
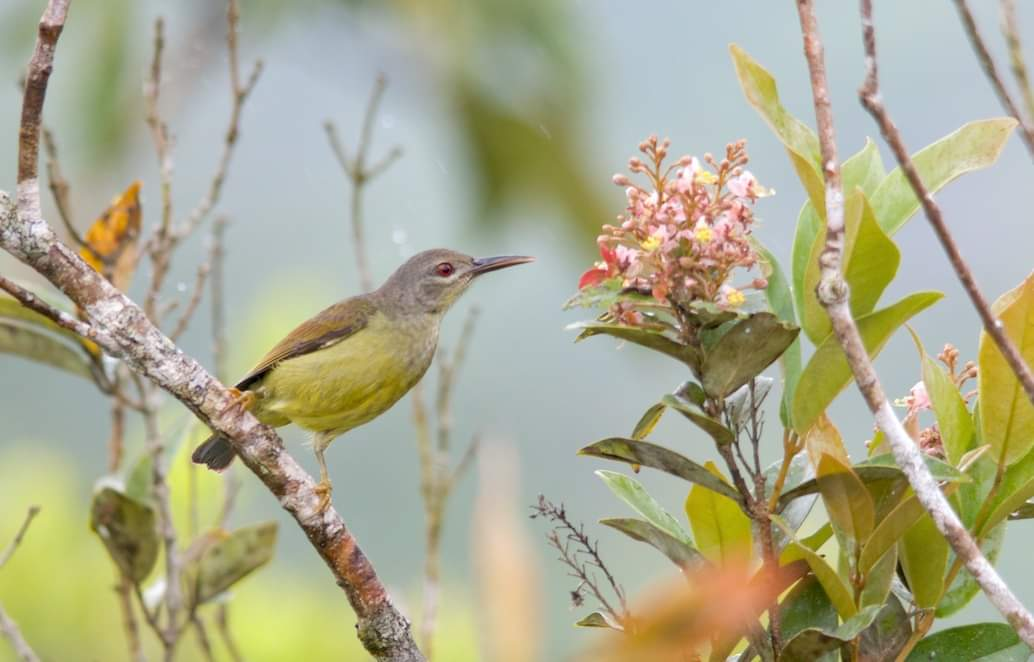
- Female

Conservation status
- Least Concern (IUCN 3.1)

Scientific classification
- Kingdom: Animalia
- Phylum: Chordata
- Class: Aves
- Order: Passeriformes
- Family: Nectariniidae
- Genus: Anthreptes
- Species: A. griseigularis

Binomial name
- Anthreptes griseigularis Tweeddale, 1878

Synonyms
- Anthreptes malacensis griseigularis

= Grey-throated sunbird =

Species of bird

The grey-throated sunbird (Anthreptes griseigularis) is a species of bird in the family Nectariniidae. It is found in a wide range of semi-open wooded habitats in the northern and eastern part of the Philippines. It is often considered a subspecies of the brown-throated sunbird, but the two differ consistently in measurements and plumage, and there is no evidence of intergradation between them.

== Description and taxonomy ==
It was formerly conspecific with the Brown-throated sunbird but is differentiated reddish ear-coverts and edges of wings, grey throat and overall smaller size with clearly shorter tail.

=== Subspecies ===
Two subspecies are recognised:

- A. g. griseigularis – – Found in Samar, Leyte, Dinagat, and Northeast Mindanao and possibly Bohol,
- A. g. birgitae – Found in Luzon, Mindoro. Catanduanes and possibly Polillo Islands; larger, particularly in bill length, than nominate, and male's underparts are duller and darker.

== Ecology and behavior ==
Not much is known about its diet but it is presumed to have the typical flowerpecker diet of small fruits, insects, nectar especially from mistletoes. Typically seen singly, pairs, small groups and joins mixed species flocks. No breeding information but believed to be similar to Brown-throated sunbird

== Habitat and conservation status ==
Its natural habitats are tropical moist lowland forest, mangrove forest, second growth and plantations up to 610 meters above sea level. It prefers habitat that is closer to the coast.

The IUCN has classified the species as being of Least Concern as it has a large range and it is common throughout with the population believed to be stable. However, deforestation in the Philippines continues throughout the country due to slash and burn farming, mining, illegal logging and habitat conversion.

It is found in multiple protected areas such as Bataan National Park, Mount Banahaw, Samar Island Natural Park, Mount Makiling and Northern Sierra Madre Natural Park but like all areas in the Philippines, protection is lax and deforestation continues despite this protection on paper.
