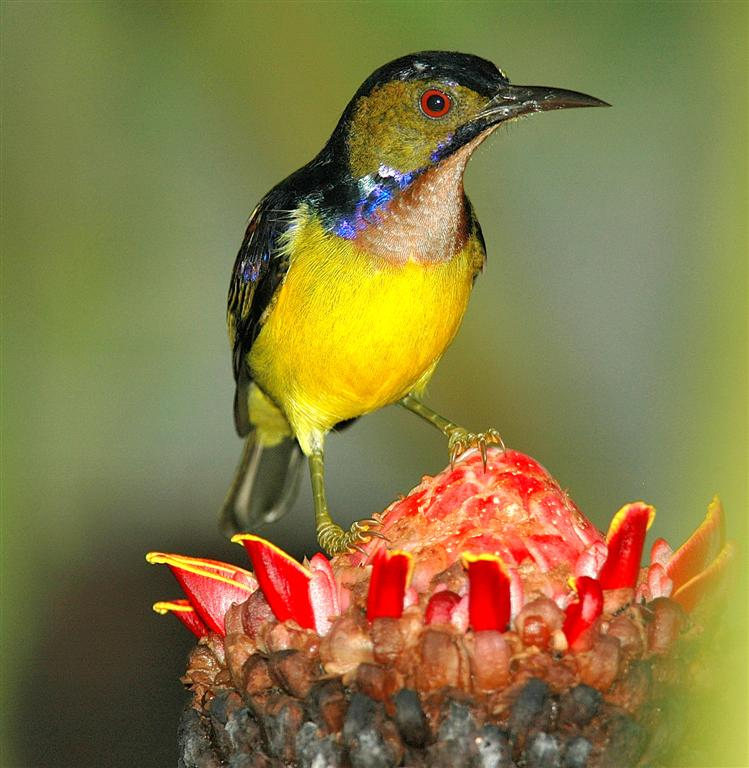
- Brown-throated sunbird Anthreptes malacensis

Scientific classification
- Kingdom: Animalia
- Phylum: Chordata
- Class: Aves
- Order: Passeriformes
- Family: Nectariniidae
- Genus: Anthreptes; Swainson, 1832

Type species
- Cinnyris javanica Swainson, 1832

Species
- See text

= Anthreptes =

Genus of birds

Anthreptes is a genus of passerine birds in the sunbird family, Nectariniidae.

These small birds are found in Africa, Southeast Asia, the Greater Sunda Islands, the Philippines and western Wallacea. Most species show marked sexual dichromatism with the male having more brightly coloured plumage.

== Taxonomy ==
The genus Anthreptes was introduced in 1832 by the English zoologist William Swainson with Cynniris javanica Swainson as the type species and only species in the genus. The name Cynniris javanica is a junior synonym of Certhia malacensis that had been introduced in 1786 by Austrian naturalist Giovanni Antonio Scopoli. The genus name combines the Ancient Greek ανθος/anthos meaning "flower" or "blossom" with θρεπτης/threptēs meaning "feeder".

== Species ==
The genus contains the following 15 species:

Image	Common name	Scientific name	Distribution
	Plain-backed sunbird	Anthreptes reichenowi	Kenya and north-eastern Tanzania
	Anchieta's sunbird	Anthreptes anchietae	Angola, the DRC, Malawi, Mozambique, Tanzania, and Zambia
	Plain sunbird	Anthreptes simplex	Brunei, Indonesia, Malaysia, Myanmar, Singapore, and Thailand.
	Brown-throated sunbird	Anthreptes malacensis	Myanmar to the Lesser Sundas and west Philippines.
	Grey-throated sunbird	Anthreptes griseigularis	Philippines.
	Red-throated sunbird	Anthreptes rhodolaemus	Brunei, Indonesia, Malaysia, Myanmar, the Philippines, Singapore, and Thailand.
	Mangrove sunbird	Anthreptes gabonicus	Senegal to northwestern Angola.
	Western violet-backed sunbird	Anthreptes longuemarei	sub-Saharan Africa
	Eastern violet-backed sunbird	Anthreptes orientalis	Djibouti in north to Tanzania
	Uluguru violet-backed sunbird	Anthreptes neglectus	eastern Kenya, eastern Tanzania, and north-eastern Mozambique.
	Violet-tailed sunbird	Anthreptes aurantius	Angola, Cameroon, Central African Republic, Republic of the Congo, Democratic Republic of the Congo, and Gabon.
	Little green sunbird	Anthreptes seimundi	Angola, Cameroon, Central African Republic, Republic of the Congo, Democratic Republic of the Congo, Ivory Coast, Equatorial Guinea, Gabon, Ghana, Liberia, Nigeria, Rwanda, Sierra Leone, South Sudan, Tanzania, Togo, and Uganda.
	Yellow-chinned sunbird	Anthreptes rectirostris	Sierra Leone to Ghana.
	Grey-chinned sunbird	Anthreptes tephrolaemus	Nigeria to Uganda, Kenya, Tanzania, Angola and Bioko.
	Banded green sunbird	Anthreptes rubritorques	Tanzania.
