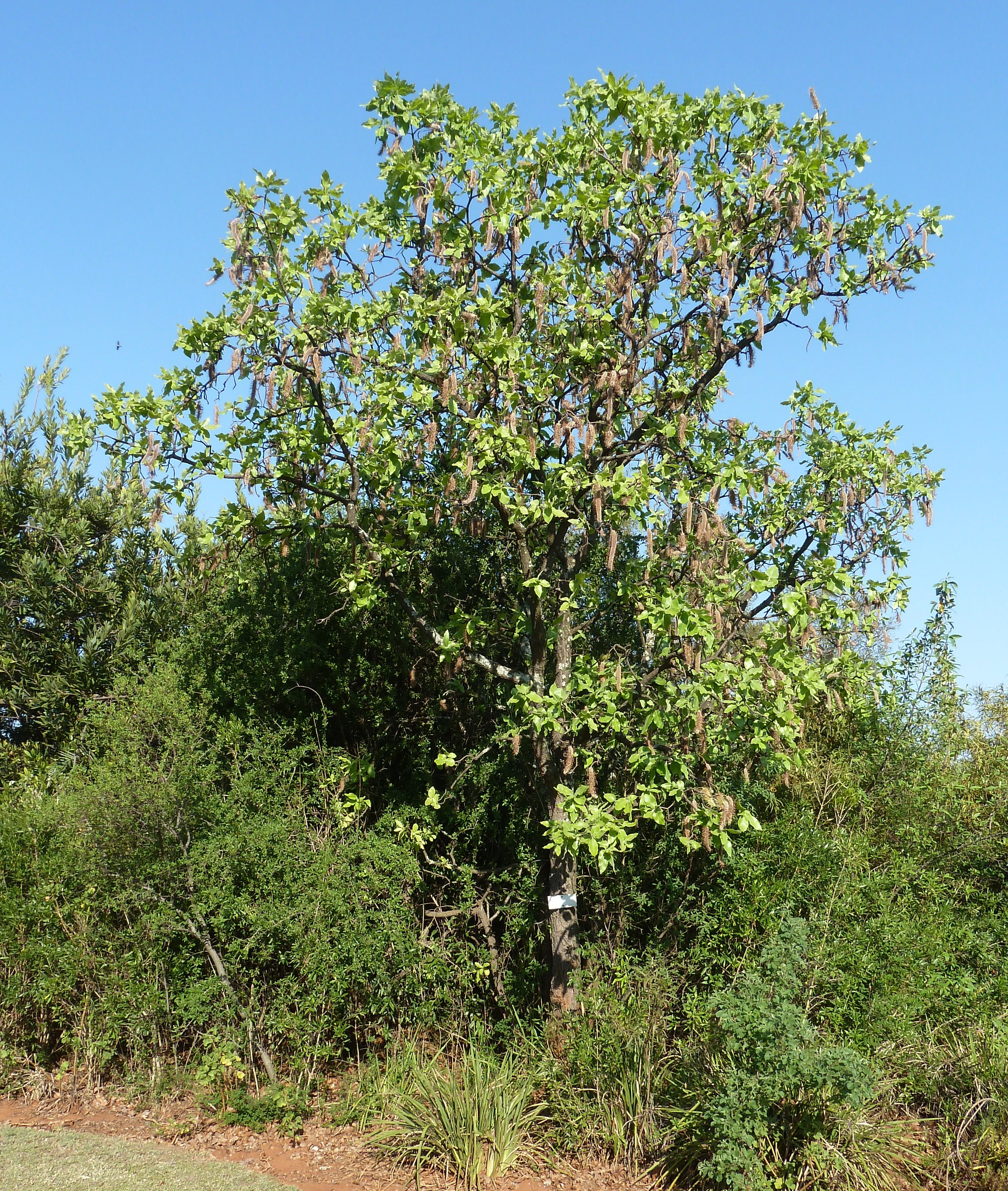

Conservation status
- Least Concern (IUCN 3.1)

Scientific classification
- Kingdom: Plantae
- Clade: Tracheophytes
- Clade: Angiosperms
- Clade: Eudicots
- Order: Proteales
- Family: Proteaceae
- Genus: Faurea
- Species: F. rochetiana

Binomial name
- Faurea rochetiana (A.Rich.) Chiov. ex Pic.Serm.

Synonyms
- Faurea decipiens C.H.Wright; Faurea rochetiana subsp. speciosa (Welw.) Troupin; Faurea speciosa Welw.; Leucadendron rochetianum Kuntze; Leucospermum rochetianum A.Rich.; Trichostachys speciosa Welw.

= Faurea rochetiana =

Species of flowering plant

Faurea rochetiana, also known as the broad-leaved beechwood, is a tree found in much of Africa from Sudan south to Limpopo, Mpumalanga and northern KwaZulu-Natal. The tree is small and leafy. It has wider leaves, larger flowers and flower veins and also denser hairy twigs than the bushveld beechwood. The tree's national number is 76.
