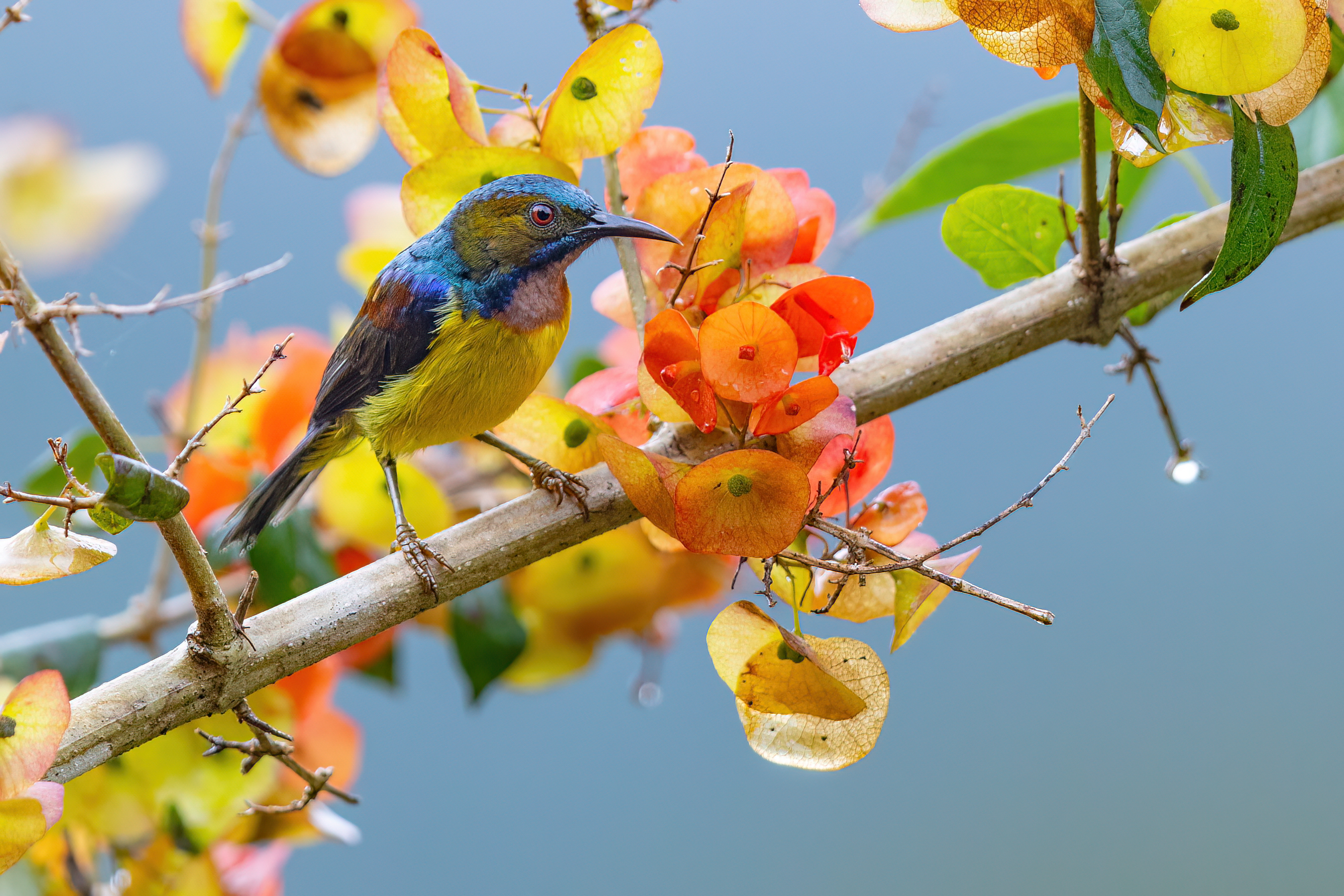

Conservation status
- Least Concern (IUCN 3.1)

Scientific classification
- Kingdom: Animalia
- Phylum: Chordata
- Class: Aves
- Order: Passeriformes
- Family: Nectariniidae
- Genus: Anthreptes
- Species: A. malacensis

Binomial name
- Anthreptes malacensis (Scopoli, 1786)

= Brown-throated sunbird =

Species of bird

The brown-throated sunbird (Anthreptes malacensis), also known as the plain-throated sunbird, is a species of bird in the family Nectariniidae. It is found in a wide range of semi-open habitats in south-east Asia, ranging from Myanmar to the Lesser Sundas and west Philippines. The grey-throated sunbird found in the remaining part of the Philippines is often considered a subspecies of the brown-throated sunbird, but the two differ consistently in measurements and plumage, and there is no evidence of intergradation between them.

== Taxonomy ==
The following subspecies are recognised:

- A. m. malacensis (Scopoli, 1786) – mainland Southeast Asia, Sumatra and satellite islands, most of Borneo aside from the north, Java and Bali
- A. m. anambae Oberholser, 1917 – Anambas Islands
- A. m. erixanthus Oberholser, 1932 – Natuna Islands
- A. m. bornensis Riley, 1920 – north Borneo
- A. m. mjobergi Bangs & Peters, JL, 1927 – Maratua
- A. m. paraguae Riley, 1920 – Palawan
- A. m. heliolusius Oberholser, 1923 – Mindanao
- A. m. wiglesworthi Hartert, 1902 – Sulu Archipelago
- A. m. iris Parkes, 1971 – Sibutu Islands
- A. m. chlorigaster Sharpe, 1877 – Western Visayas
- A. m. cagayanensis Mearns, 1905 – Mapun
- A. m. heliocalus Oberholser, 1923 – Sangihe and Siau
- A. m. celebensis Shelley, 1878 – Sulawesi and satellite islands
- A. m. extremus Mees, 1966 – Banggai and Sula
- A. m. convergens Rensch, 1929 – Lombok to Alor
- A. m. rubrigena Rensch, 1931 – Sumba

== Description ==
The brown-throated sunbird is a relatively large, heavy sunbird with a thick bill. Measuring some 14 centimetres (5.5 in) in length, it has a mass of 7.4–13.5 g (0.26–0.48 oz), with males averaging slightly larger than females.

Like most sunbirds, the male brown-throated sunbird is more colourful than the female. The male has iridescent green and purple upperparts with chestnut on the wing-coverts and scapulars; it is primarily yellow below. The female is olive-green above and yellowish below.

== Behaviour ==
The brown-throated sunbird primarily feeds on nectar, but it will also take small fruits and berries. Juveniles are fed with insects.

== Gallery ==
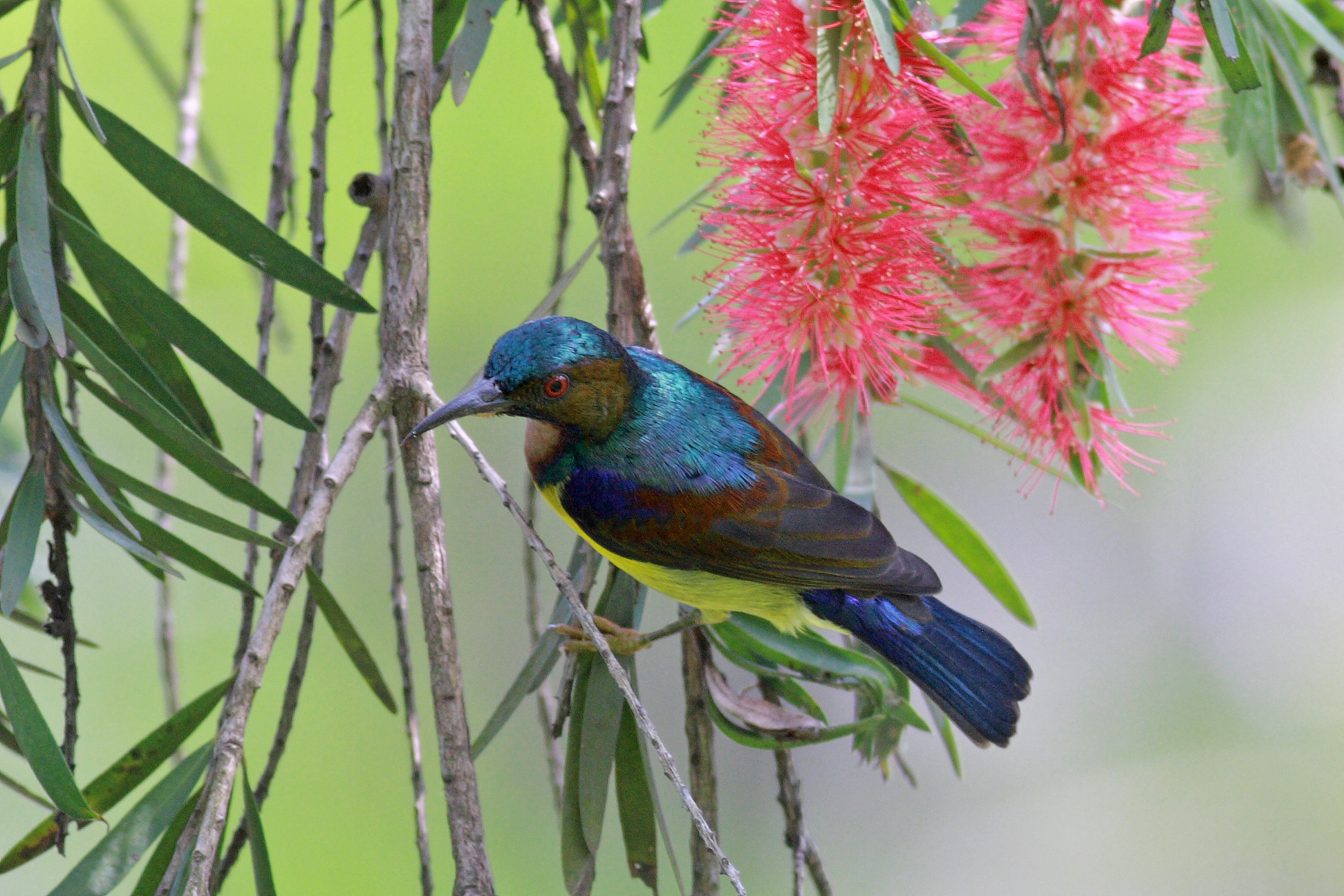
Male

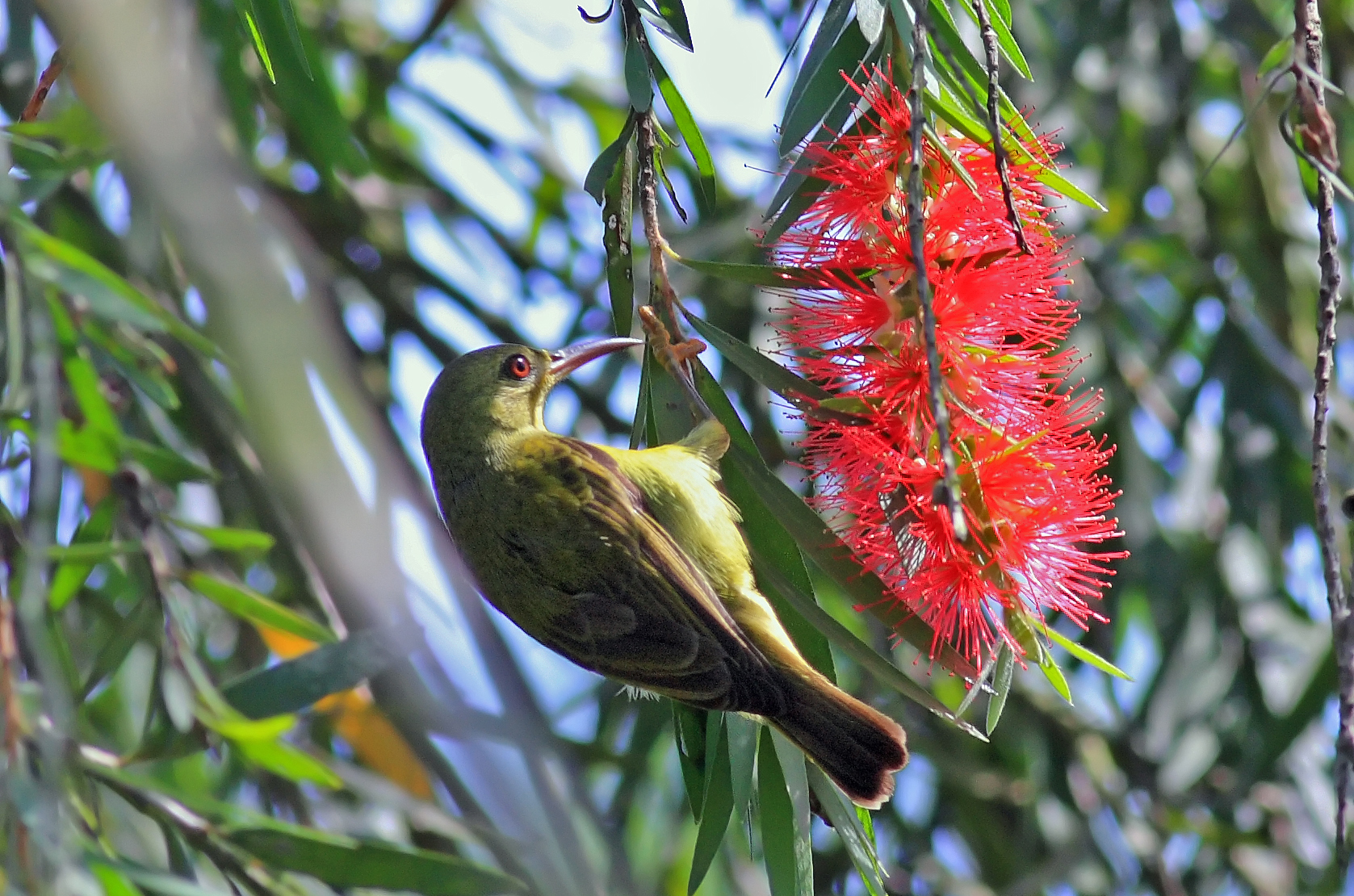
Female

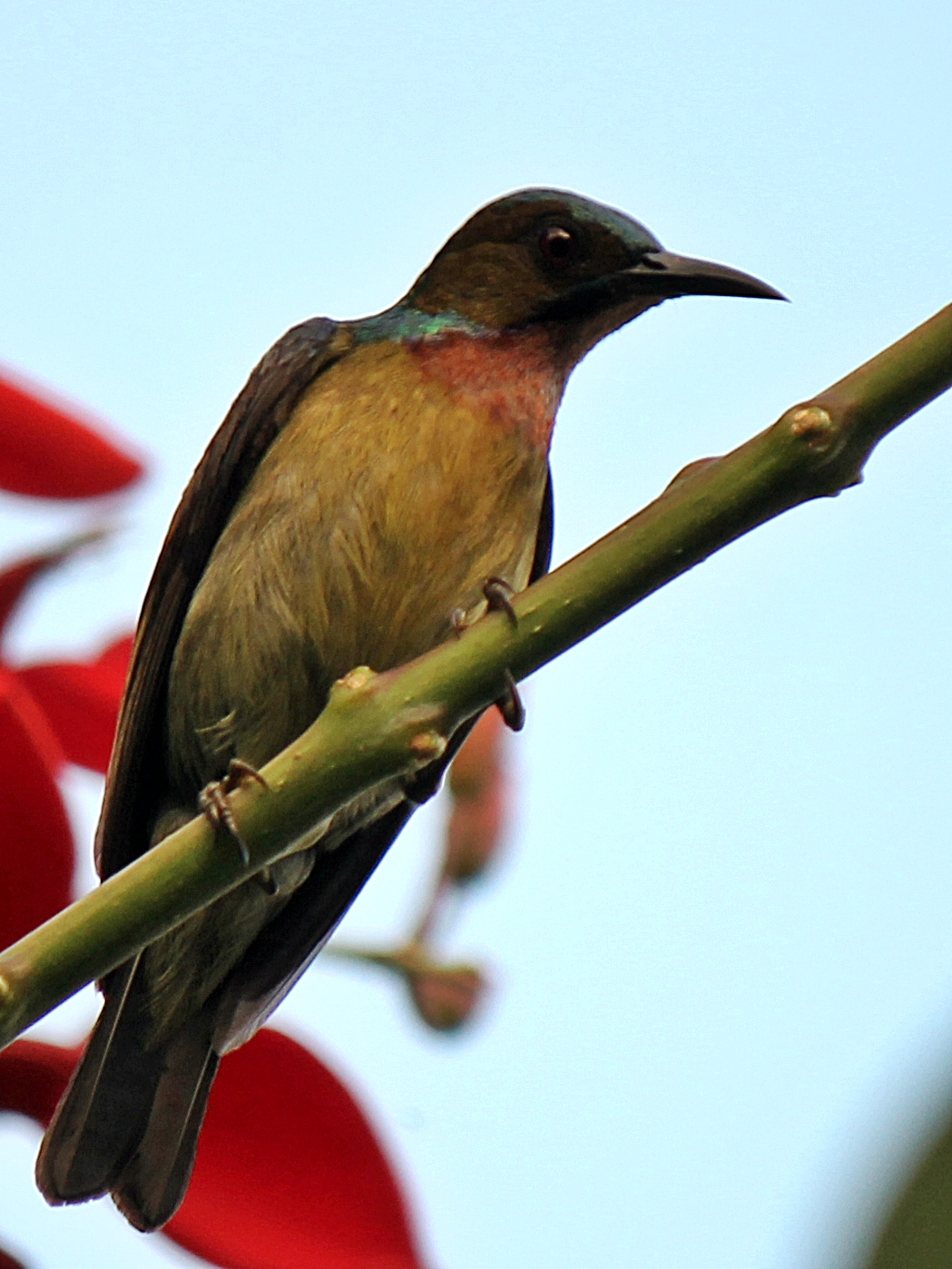
male A. m. heliocalus

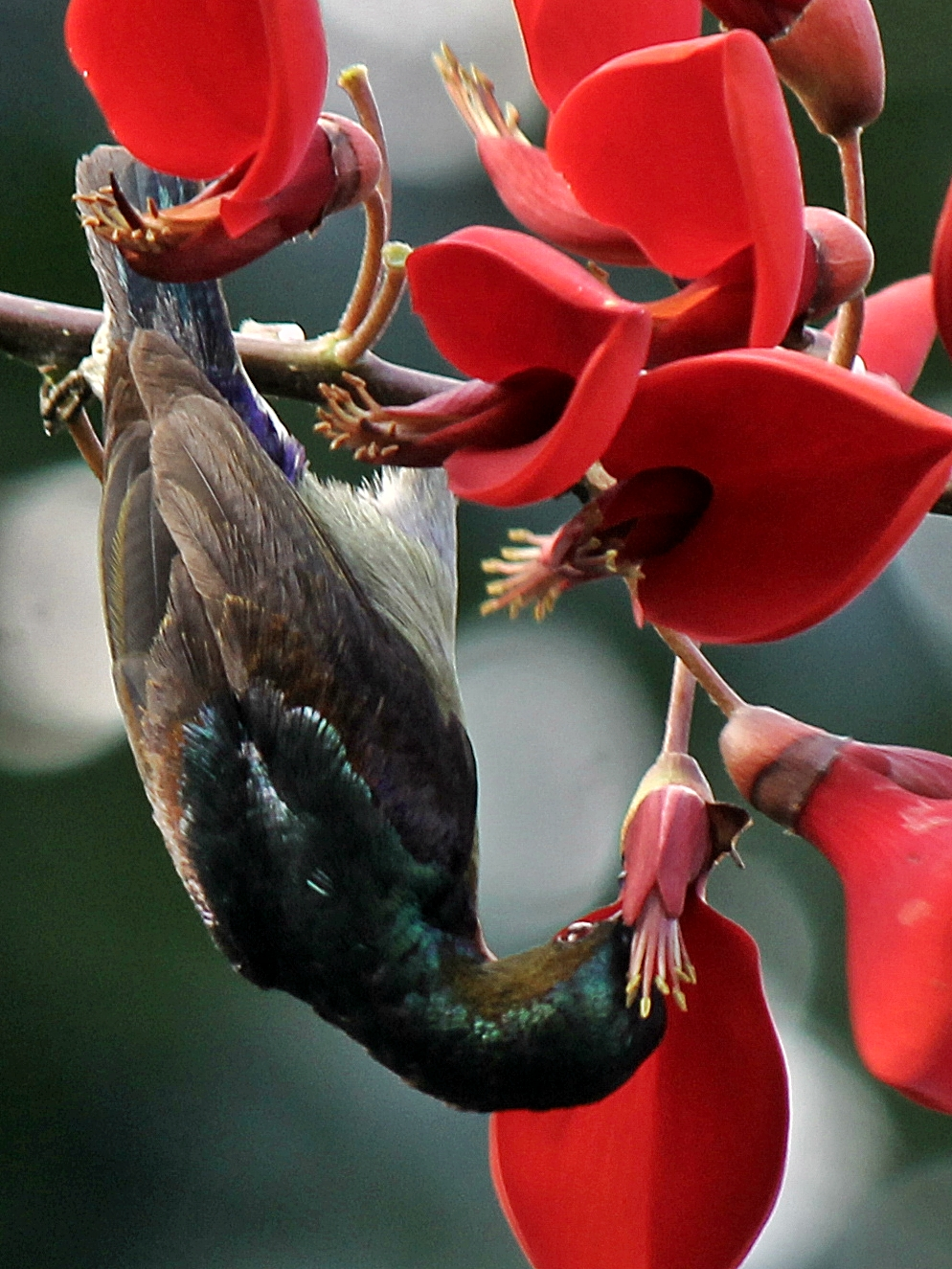
adult A. m. heliocalus

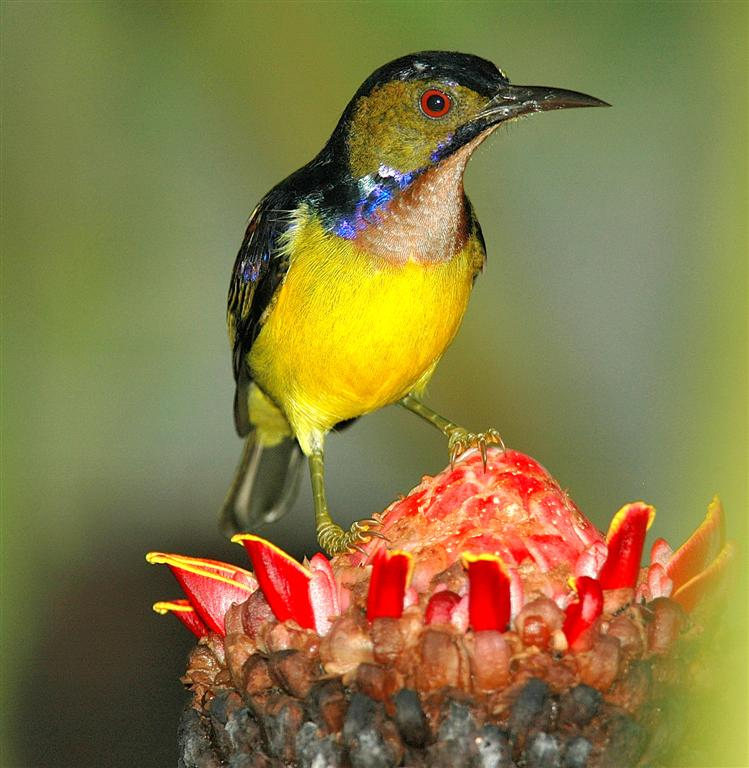
male

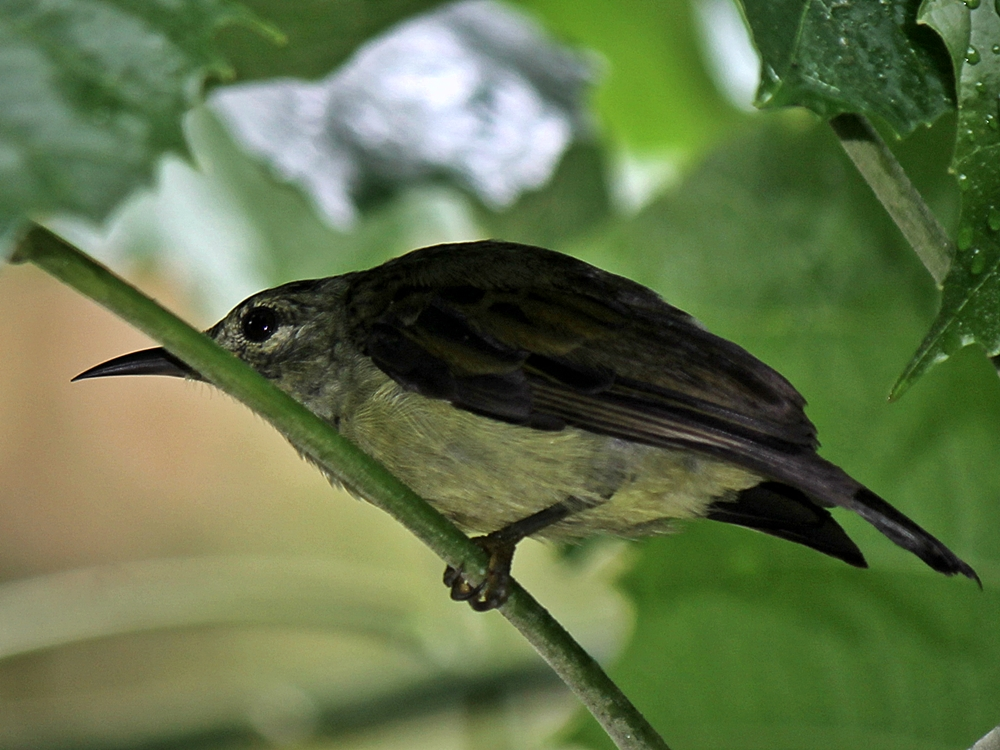
adult A. m. heliocalus

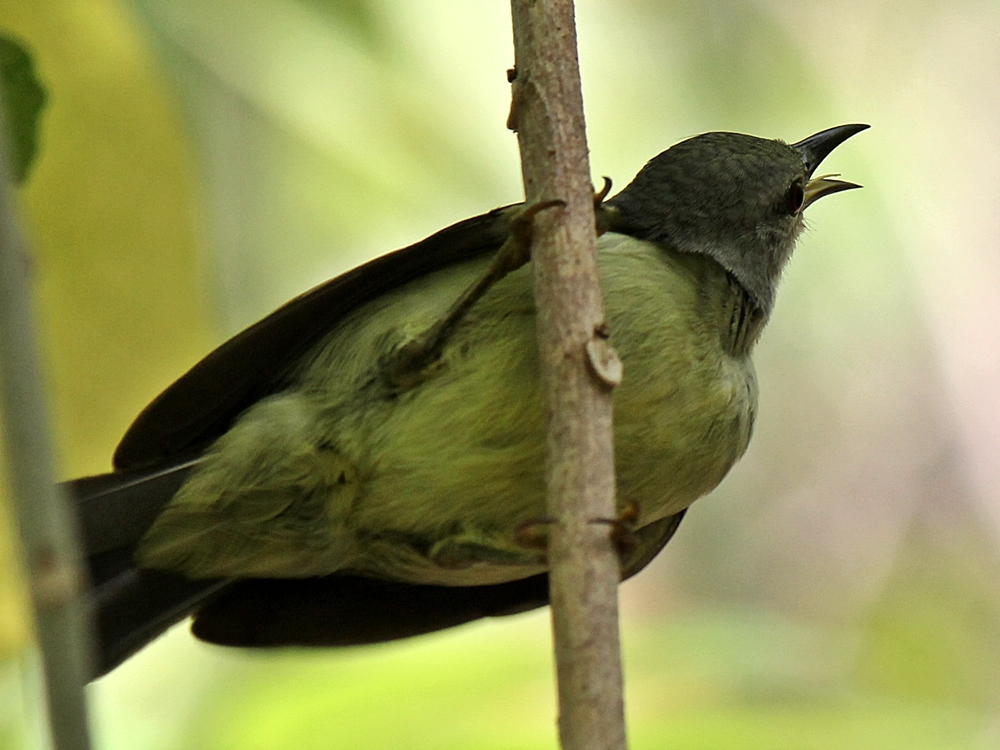
adult A. m. heliocalus

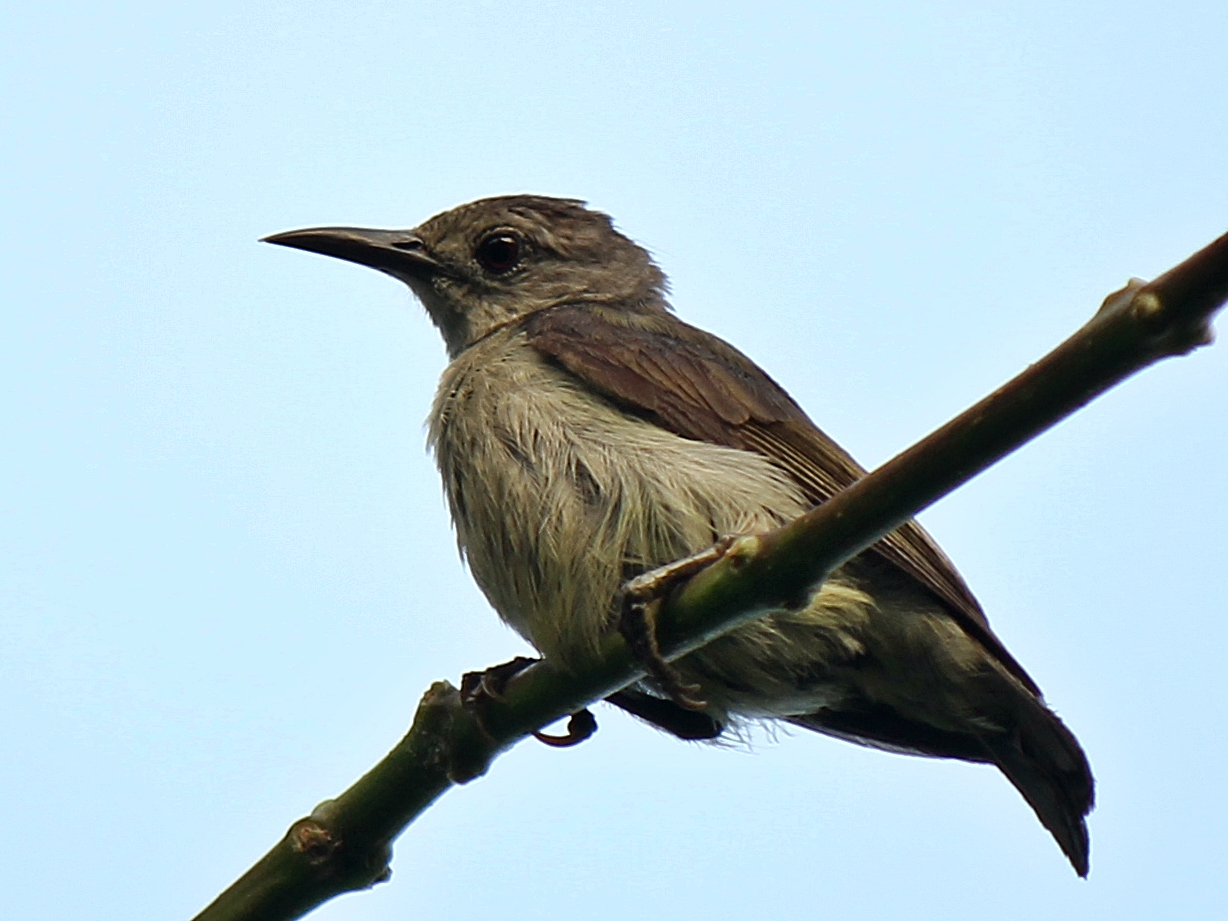
Juvenile, female A. m. heliocalus

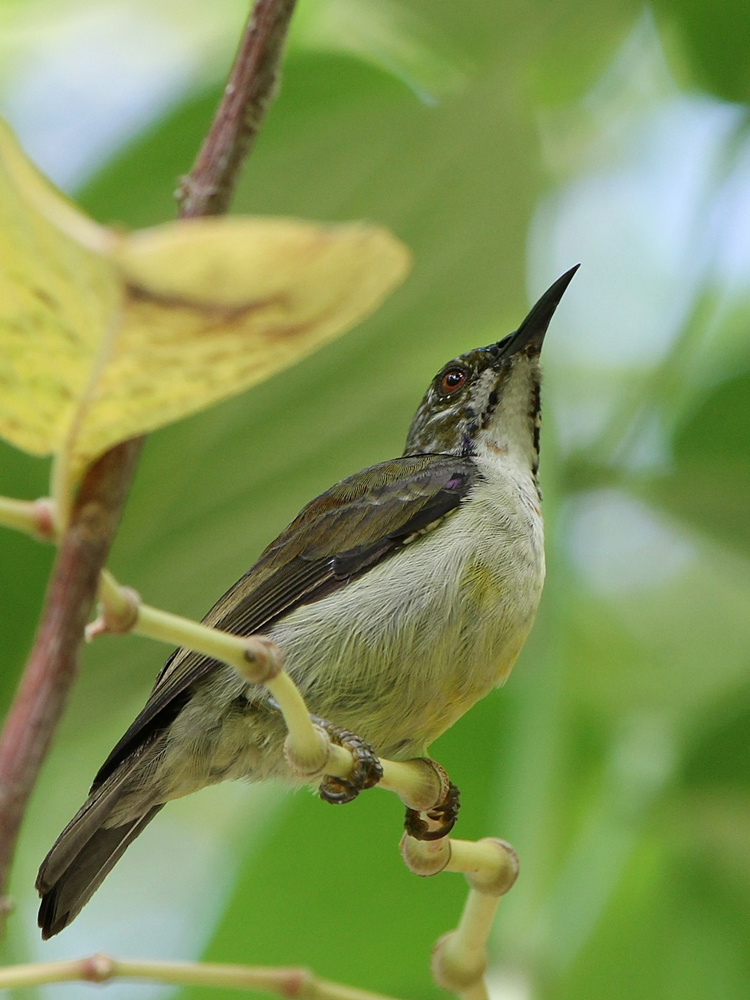
juvenile A. m. heliocalus
