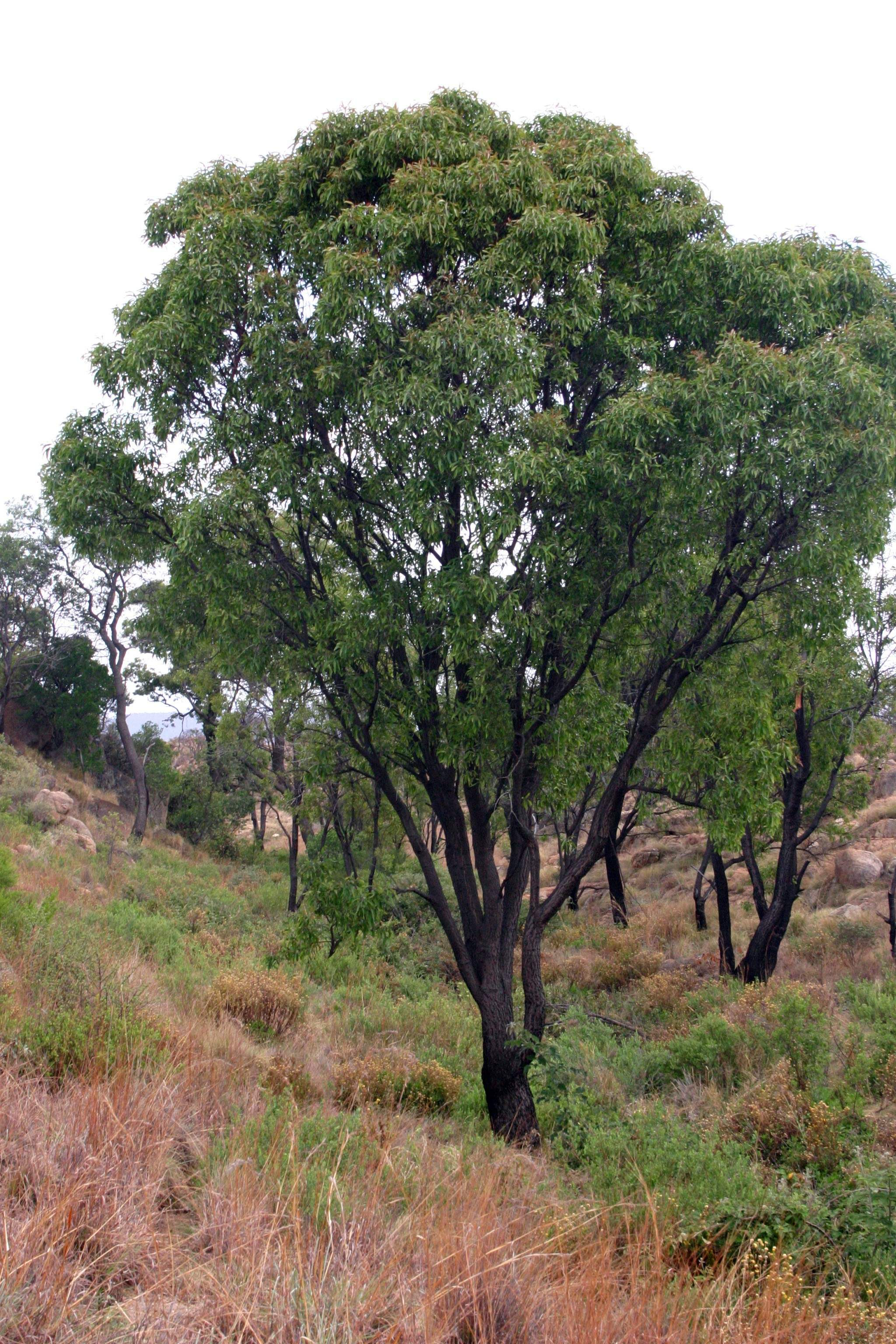

Conservation status
- Least Concern (IUCN 3.1)

Scientific classification
- Kingdom: Plantae
- Clade: Embryophytes
- Clade: Tracheophytes
- Clade: Angiosperms
- Clade: Eudicots
- Order: Proteales
- Family: Proteaceae
- Genus: Faurea
- Species: F. saligna

Binomial name
- Faurea saligna Harv.

Synonyms
- Faurea gilletii De Wild.; Faurea saligna var. gilletii (De Wild.) Hauman; Faurea saligna subsp. xanthoneura Merxm.; Faurea usambarensis Engl.

= Faurea saligna =

Willow beechwood

Species of tree from Africa

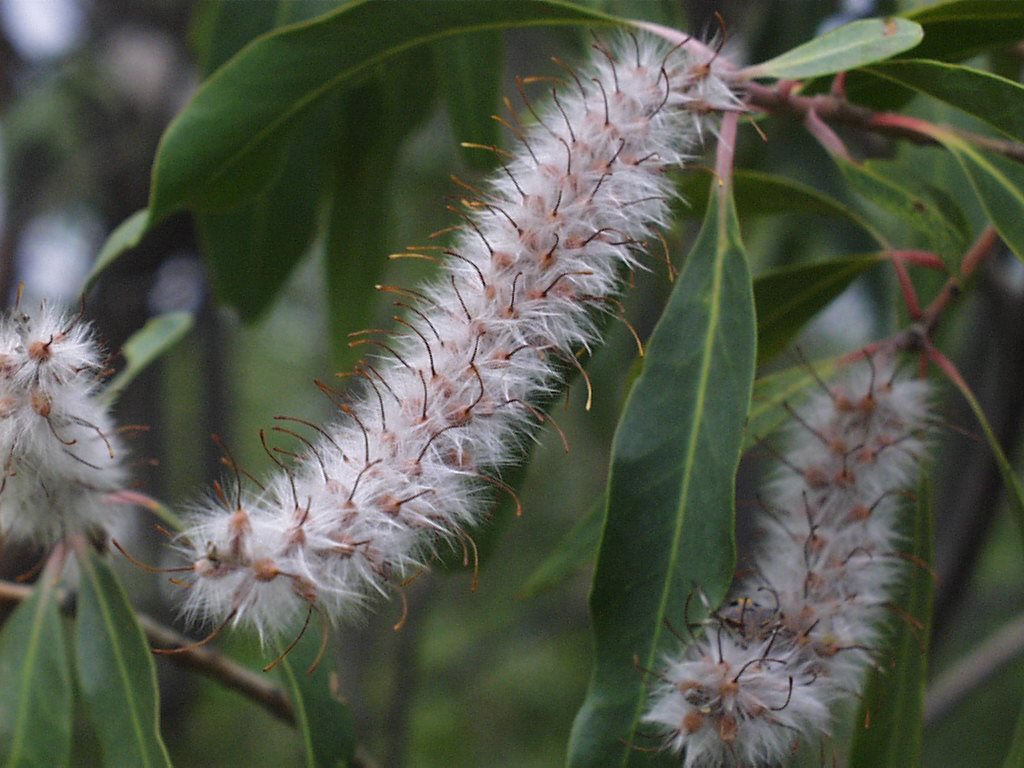
Spikes of silky nutlets

Faurea saligna is a graceful, semi-deciduous tree in the family Proteaceae. It grows to about 10 metres (33 ft), or up to 20 metres (66 ft) under forest conditions. Found from tropical Africa south to the Transvaal, Swaziland and Natal, often in large communities on sandy soil and along stream beds.

Its dark-grey to black bark is rough and deeply fissured, while the narrow drooping leaves are reminiscent of a willow (saligna meaning Salix-like). The timber was much-prized by the Voortrekkers for furniture and they named it Transvaal Boekenhout for the timber's resemblance to that of the European beech. There are some 15 species of Faurea occurring in Africa and Madagascar.

William Henry Harvey named the genus after William Caldwell Faure (1822–1844), a young soldier and enthusiastic botanist who was killed in India, and was the son of Cape Town Dutch Reformed minister Abraham Faure. Faure had accompanied Harvey on numerous botanising excursions, and had left the Cape for India in 1844 having received a commission in the East India Company's military service. He contracted cholera on arriving and was fortunate to recover. A few months later and in the company of a few fellow soldiers, he was shot by a sniper while crossing a ravine in a patch of forest, on the way to rejoining his regiment. He died after some twelve hours.

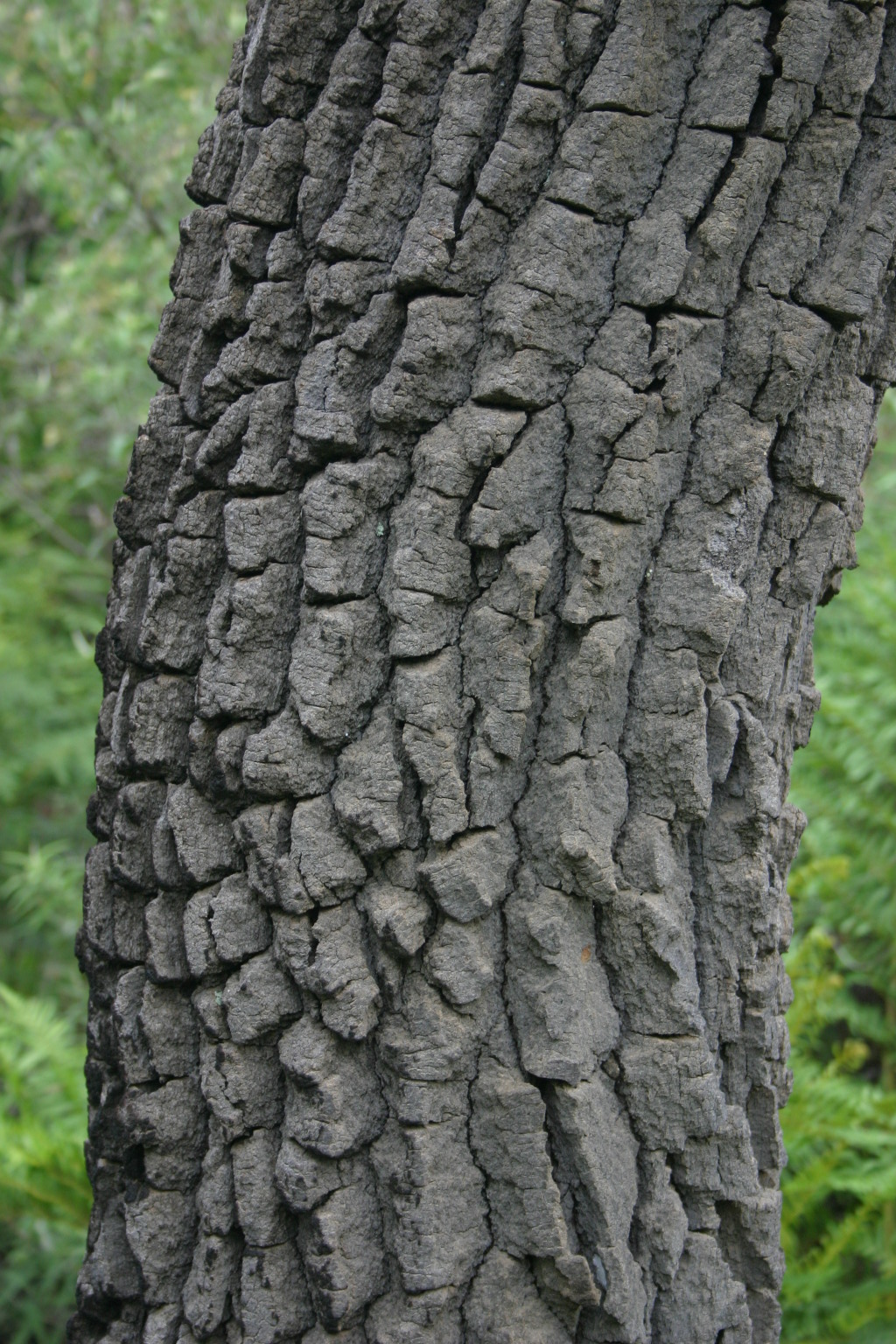
Bark

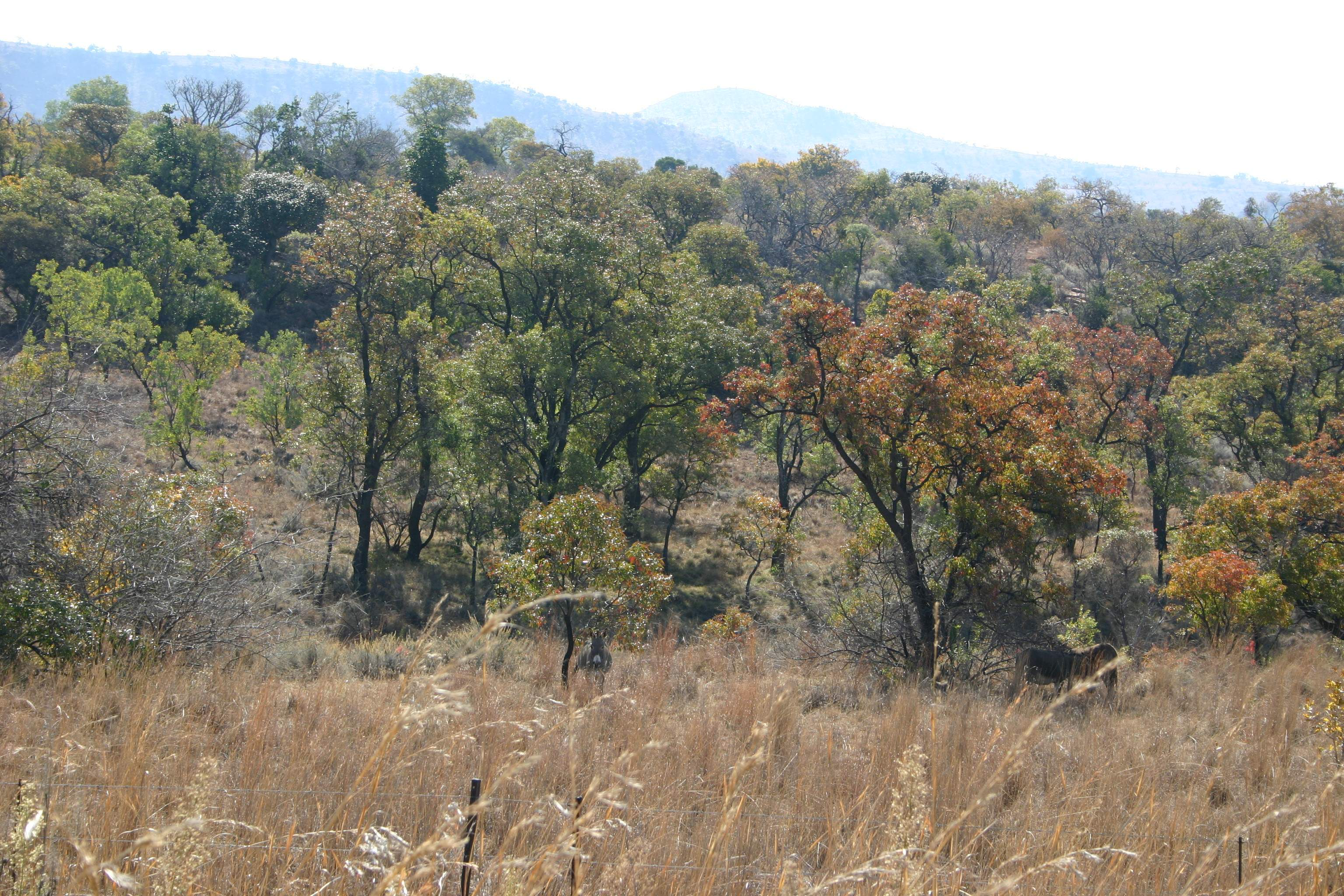
Autumn colours

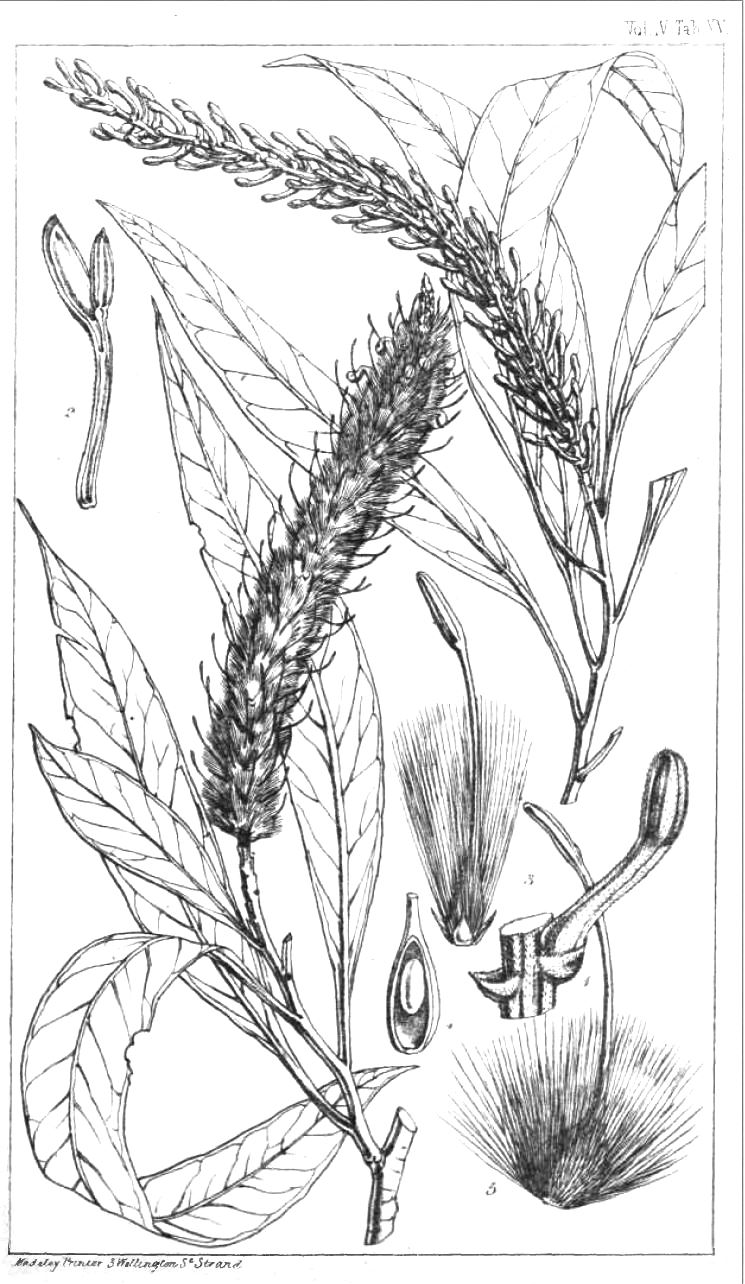
1. Portion of spike with unexpanded flowers 2. Petal and stamen 3. Pistil and squamae 4. Ovary laid open to show the solitary ovule 5. Nut with persistent style
