= Faurea coriacea =

Conservation status
- Least Concern (IUCN 3.1)

Scientific classification
- Kingdom: Plantae
- Clade: Tracheophytes
- Clade: Angiosperms
- Clade: Eudicots
- Order: Proteales
- Family: Proteaceae
- Genus: Faurea
- Species: F. coriacea

Binomial name
- Faurea coriacea Marner

Synonyms
- Faurea forficuliflora var. elliptica Humbert

Species of tree

Faurea coriacea is a tree that forms part of Faurea genus.

== Sources ==
- Plants of the World Online
