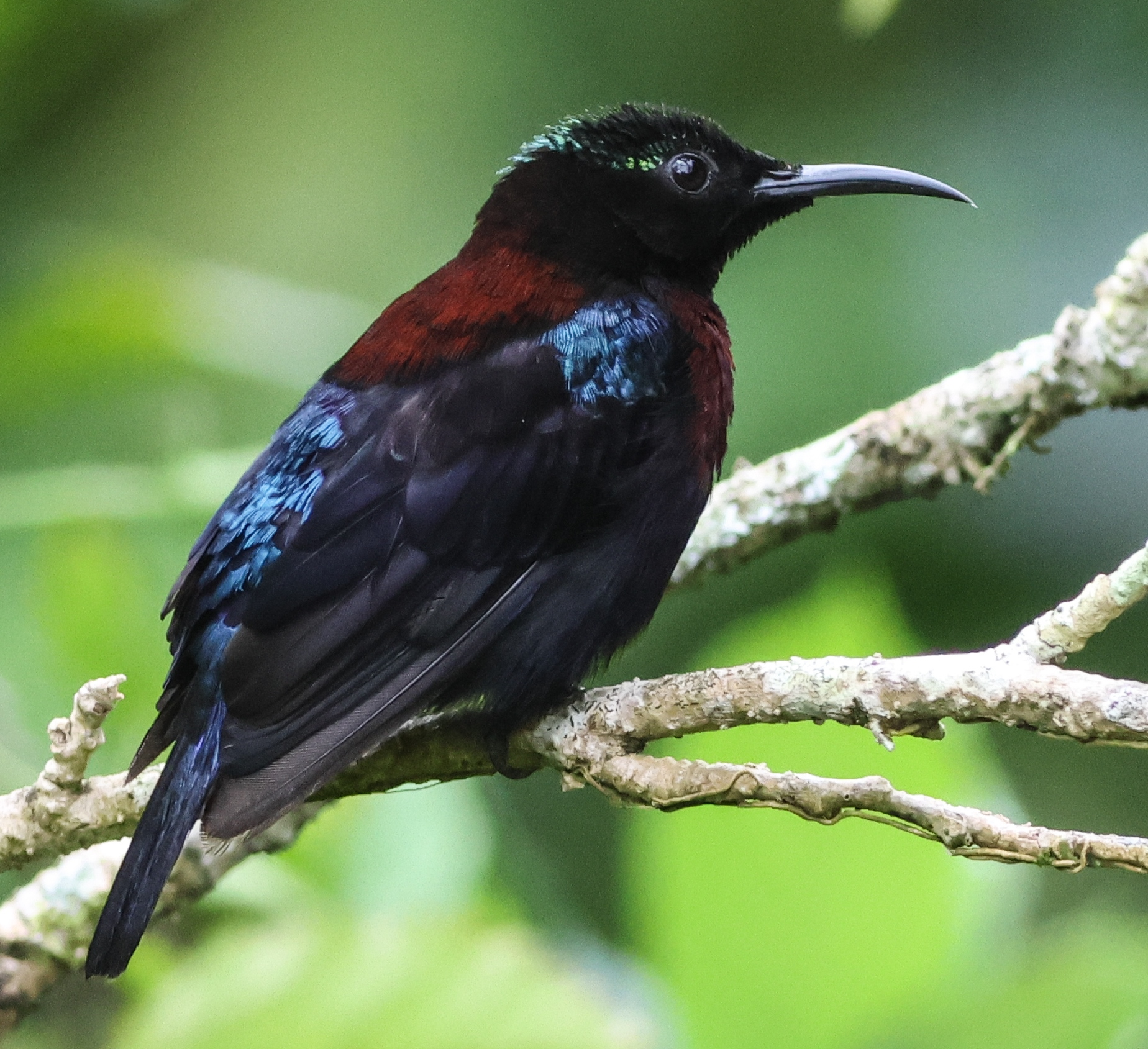
- A black sunbird male at Gardenia in Tomohon, North Sulawesi

Conservation status
- Least Concern (IUCN 3.1)

Scientific classification
- Kingdom: Animalia
- Phylum: Chordata
- Class: Aves
- Order: Passeriformes
- Family: Nectariniidae
- Genus: Leptocoma
- Species: L. aspasia

Binomial name
- Leptocoma aspasia (Lesson, RP & Garnot, 1828)

Synonyms
- Leptocoma sericea Nectarinia aspasia (Lesson & Garnot, 1828); Nectarinia sericea

= Black sunbird =

Species of bird

The black sunbird (Leptocoma aspasia) is a species of bird in the family Nectariniidae. It is found in eastern Indonesia and New Guinea. Its natural habitats are subtropical or tropical moist lowland forest and subtropical or tropical mangrove forest.

== Description ==
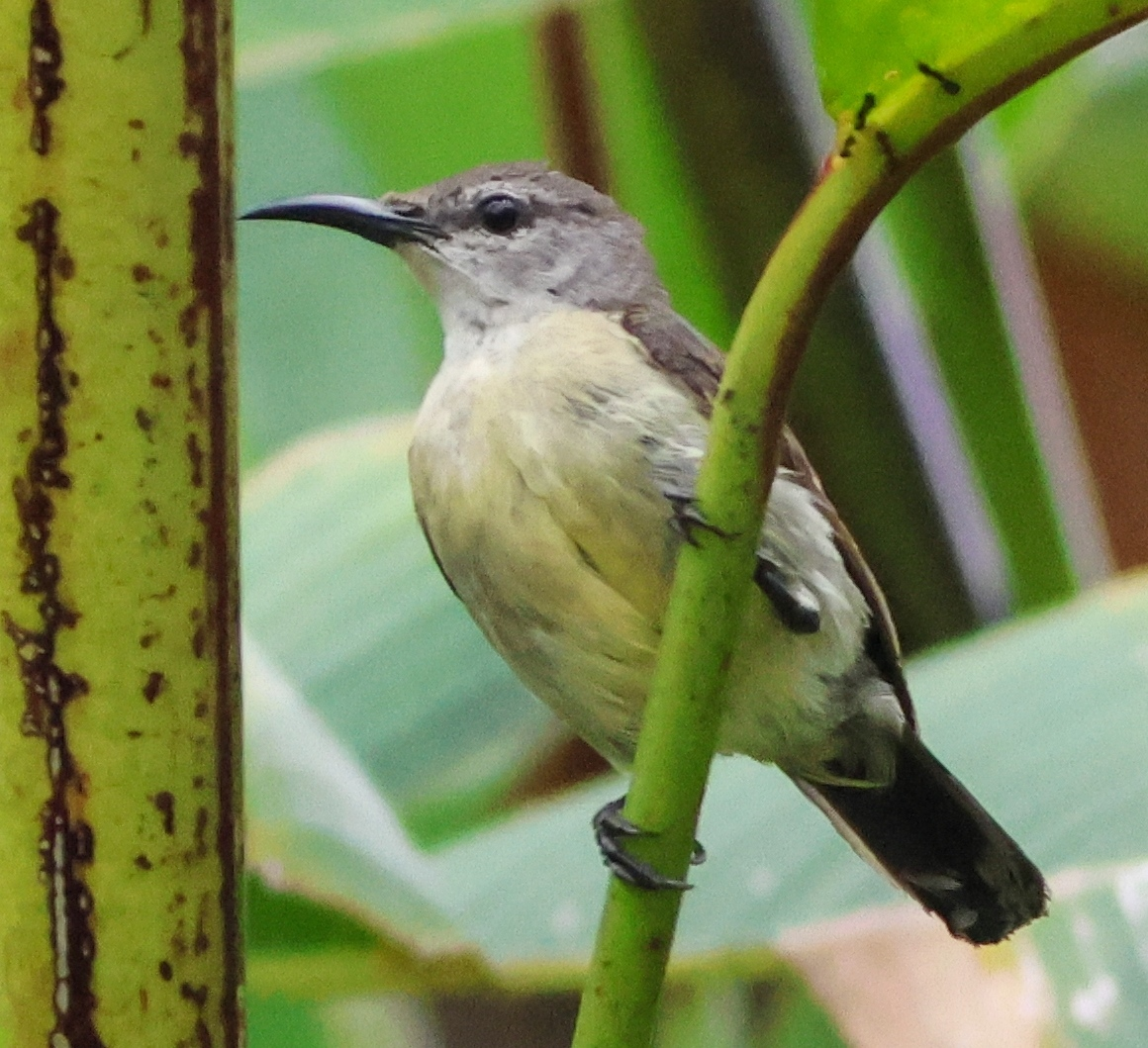
A black sunbird female at Tomohon, North Sulawesi

It is a small songbird with a long down-curved bill and iridescent body. The black sunbird has a lifespan of approximately 3.6 years. The coloring of the birds differentiate between male and female. The male black sunbird is midnight black in color with an iridescent blue-purple stripe across the upper chest. There is a crown of lustrous green on the head, while the wings and tail are glossed blue. In many regions, the throat area is iridescent reddish-purple; however, moving northward it shifts towards a bluish sparkle (Moluccas and Kai Islands). The female black sunbird has a completely different color complex than her male counterpart. Her coloration across the chest and body is dusted greenish-yellow. The wings are smothered brown as well as the head. In northern areas, the color of the female black sunbird is "nondescript", with a charcoal colored head, with an olive-green upper-body and yellow underbody. The juvenile black sunbird resembles the female sunbird with more of a distinct yellow throat.

== Taxonomy ==
Previously was placed in the genus Nectarinia, before it was revised in 2016.

== Habitat ==
Its natural habitats are subtropical or tropical moist lowland forest and subtropical or tropical mangrove forest. The black sunbird prefers a variety of forest types, especially at the forest edge. They are common in coconut plantations and other cultivations, such as shrubs and gardens.

== Diet ==
These birds forage for various arthropods, as well as fruit and nectar from flowers and trees. They often forage alone, in pairs or family groups, and occasionally they are found in larger flocks; rarely do they join mixed-species flocks. They are very active throughout their forage. The birds obtain most of their food from gleaning, and hover-gleaning as they catch their food from out the air.

== Song and sounds ==
The song and sound is a rapid, sweet cadence lasting 1.5-4 seconds in duration. It consists of single or a series of high-pitched sibilant notes; rapid fire double notes, one is higher than the other, clear hallow peep; a rapid slurred, shrill zi-zi-zi-ziclosing with the flight call pit-pit-pit.

== Breeding ==
The black sunbird was recorded laying in August and September in Sulawesi, March and May-January on islands of Papua New Guinea.

== Gallery ==
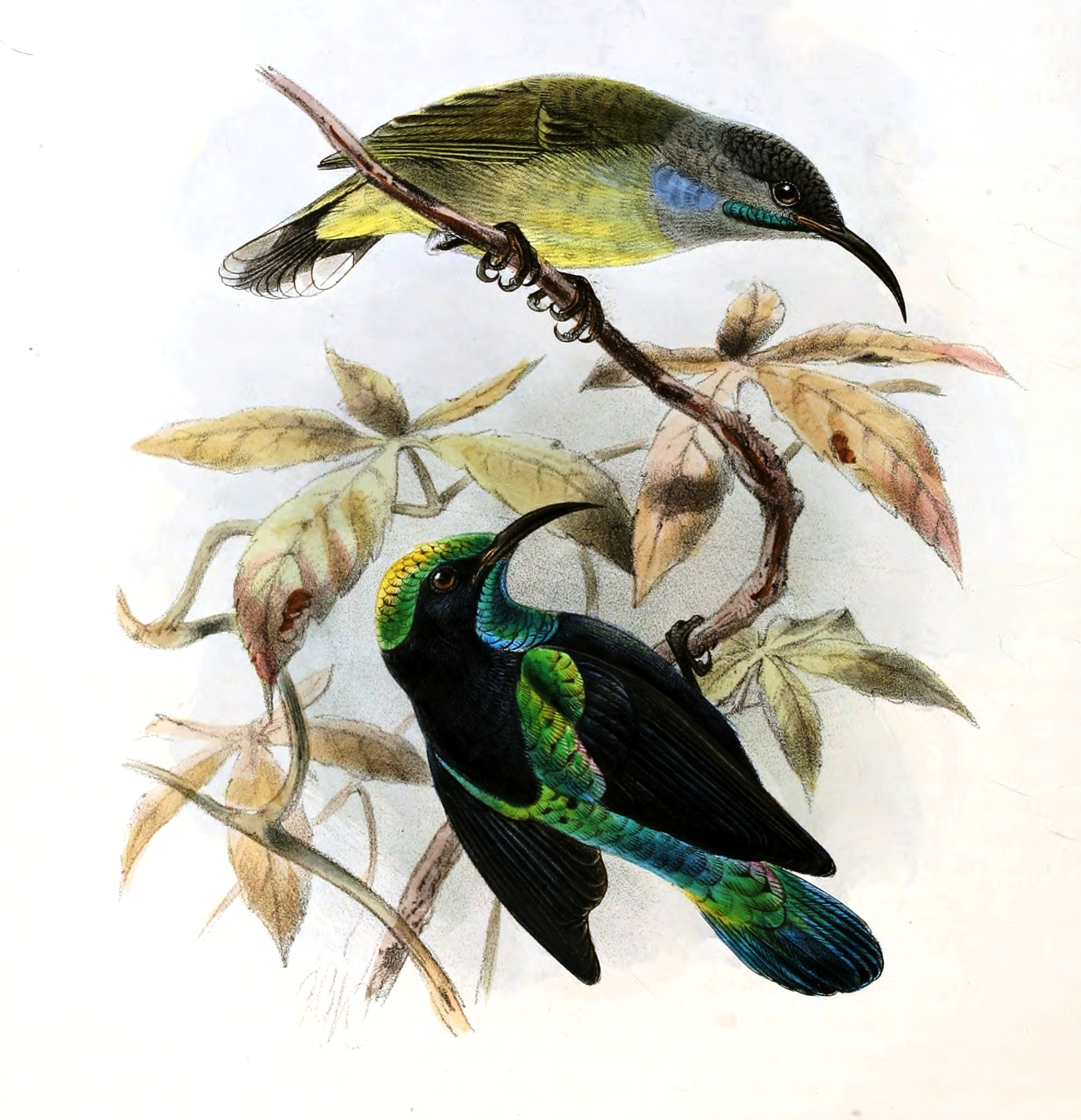
subspecies chlorolaema

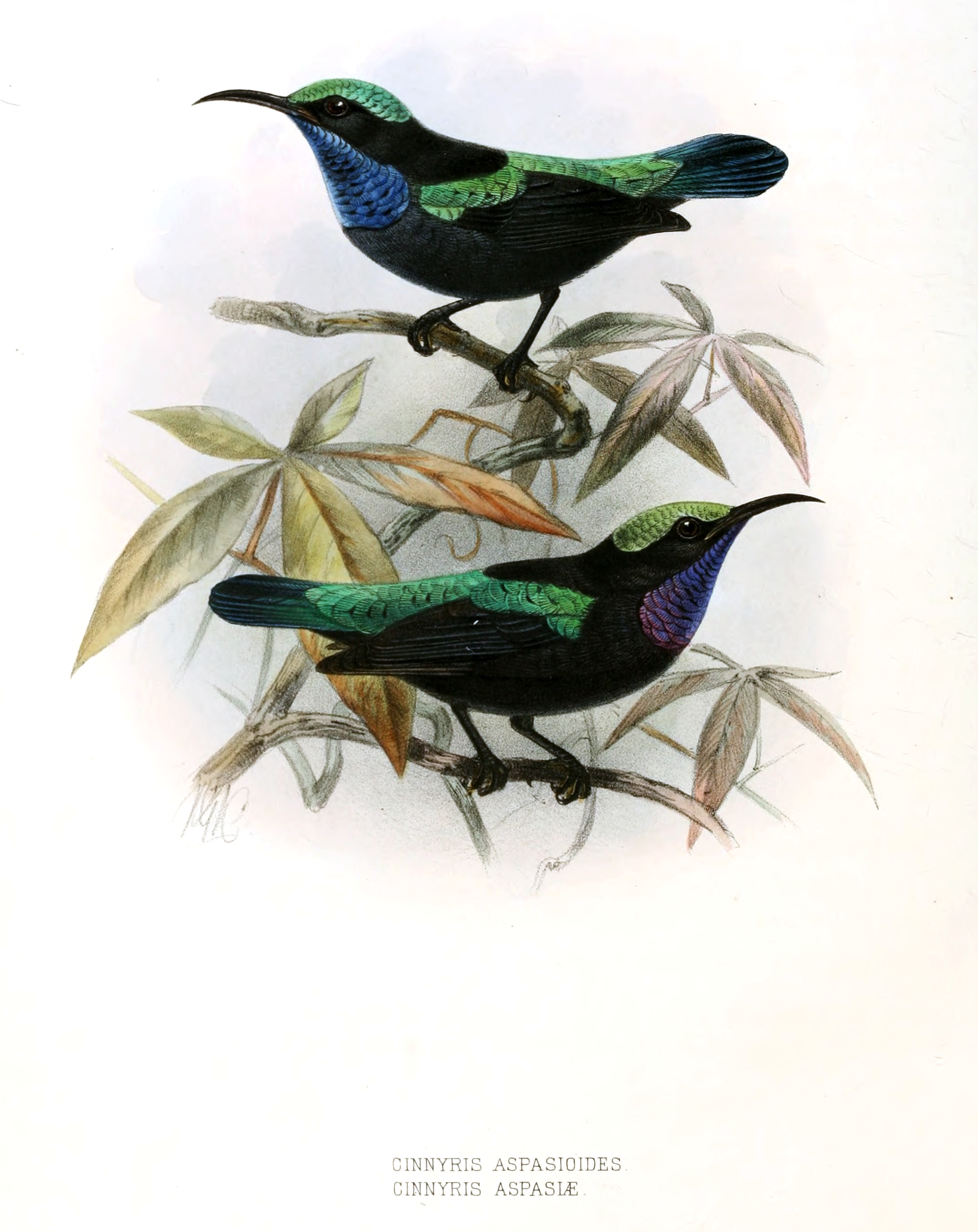
subspecies aspasiodes

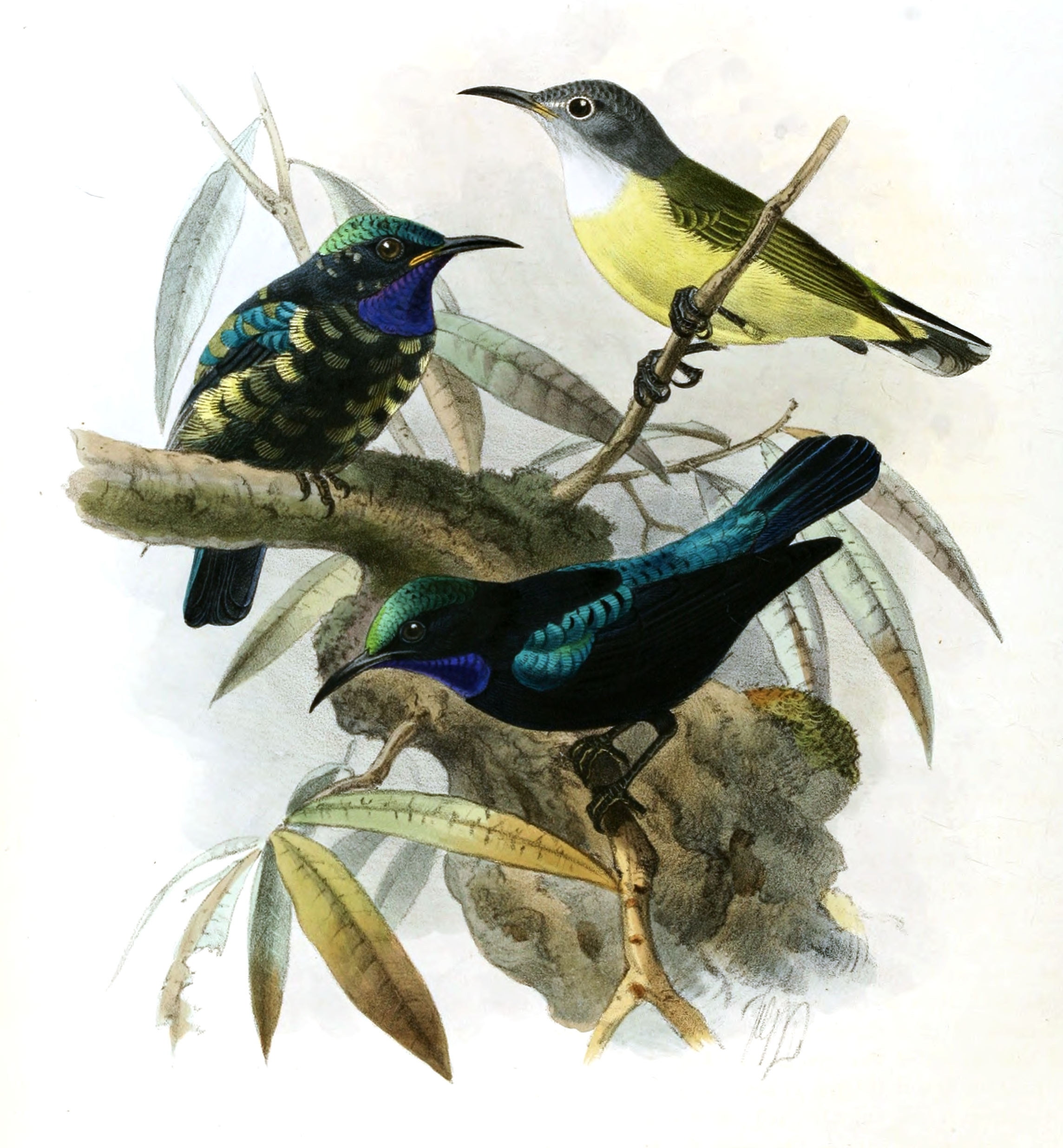
subspecies corinna

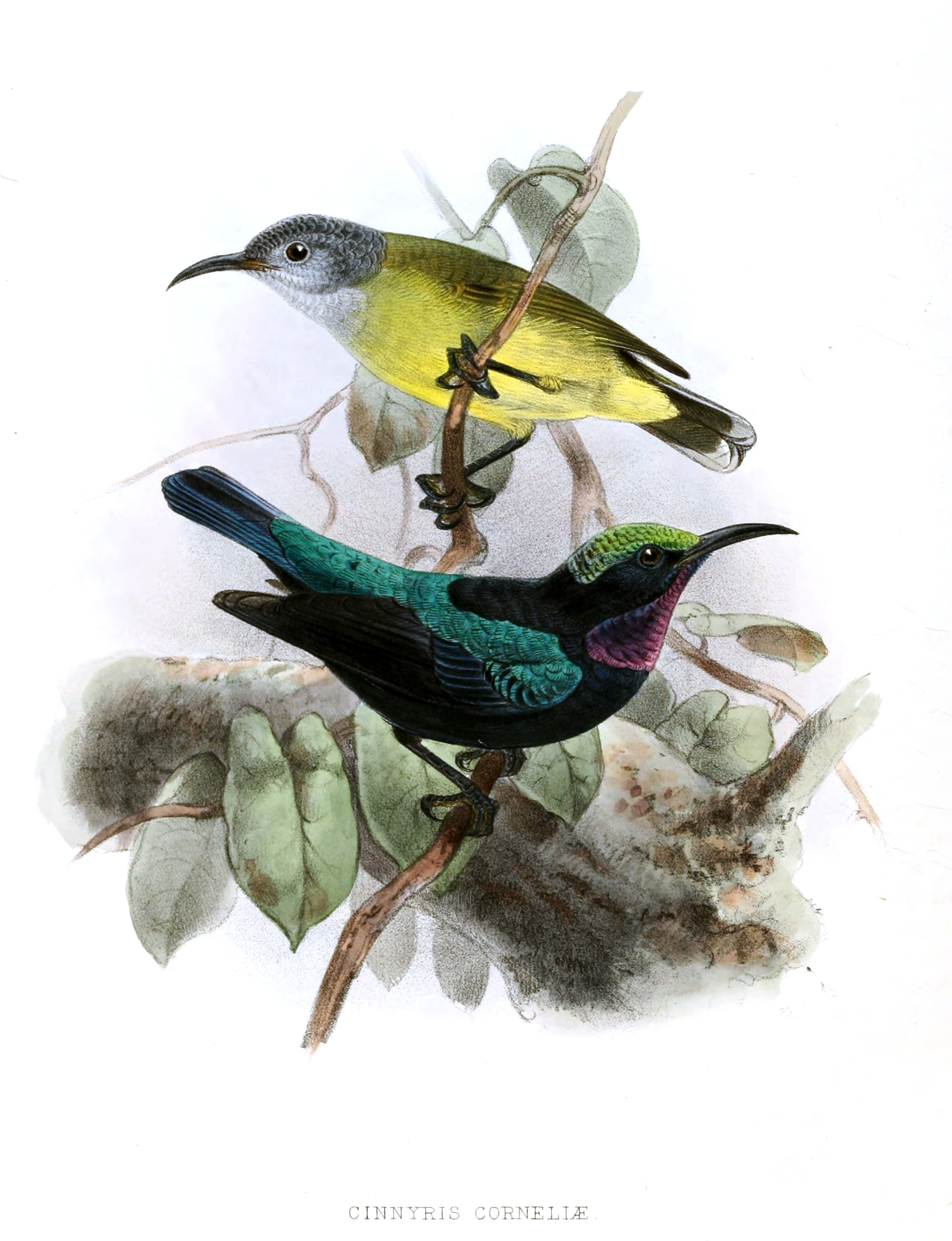
subspecies cornelia

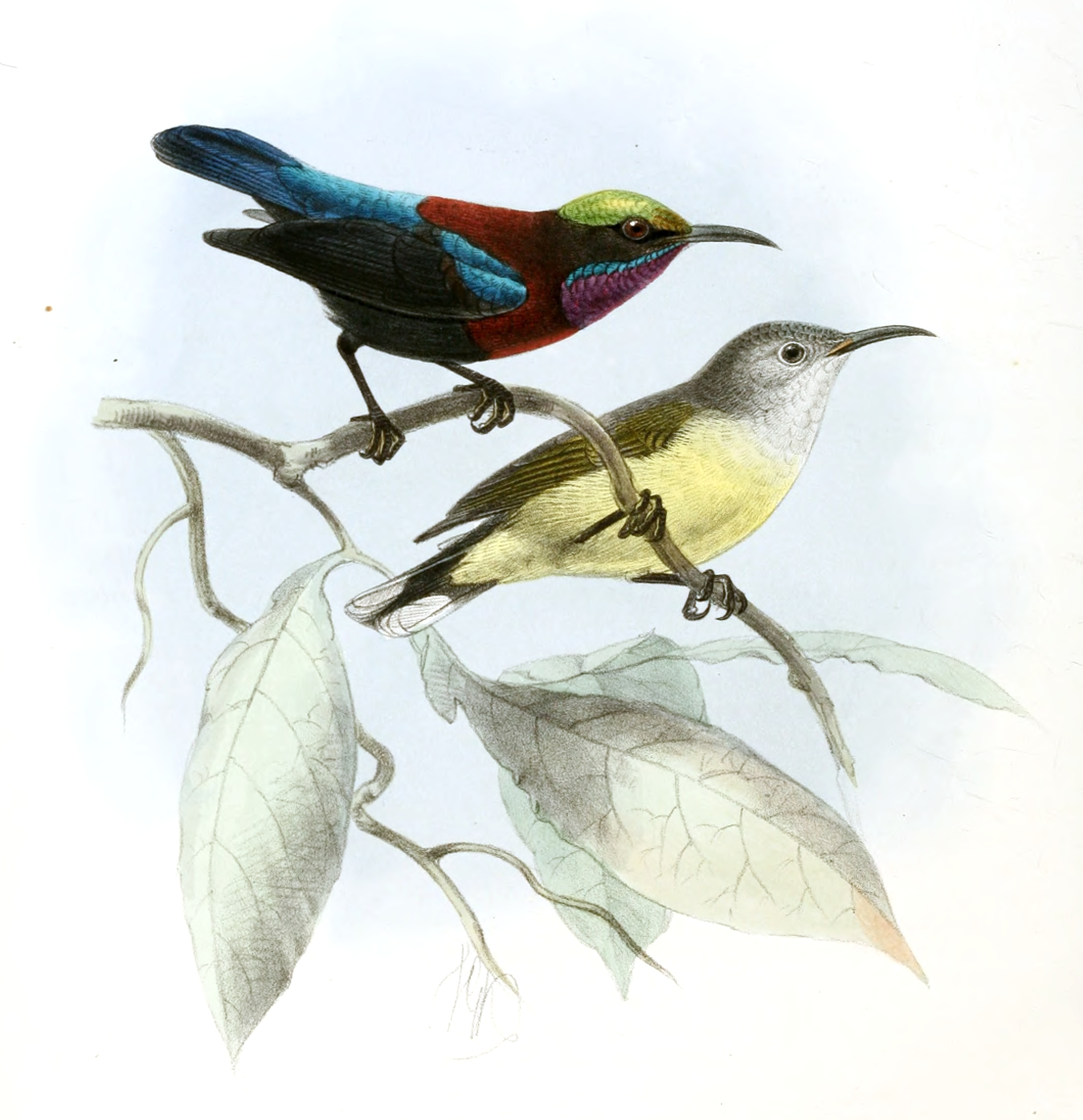
subspecies grayi

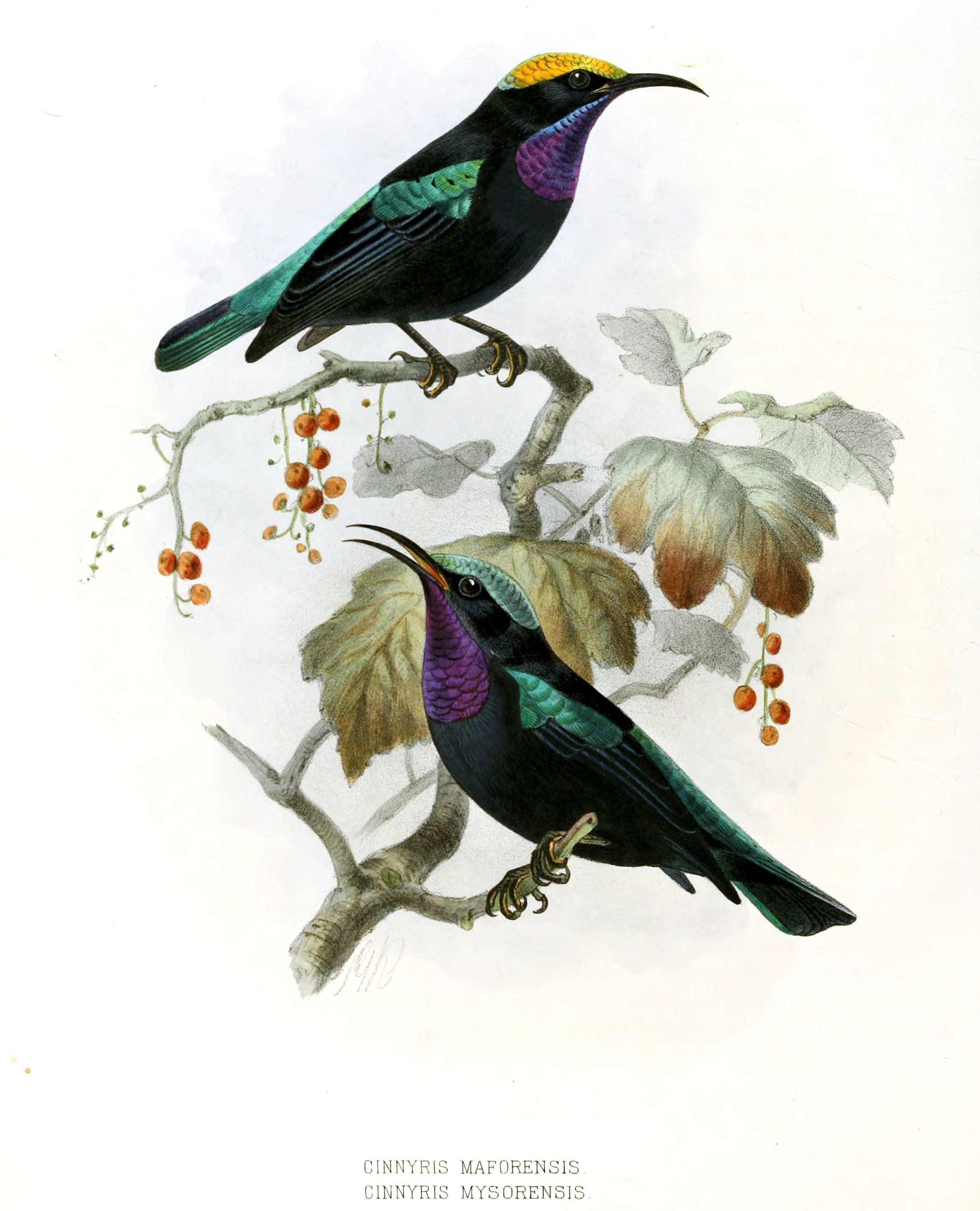
subspecies maforensis & mysorensis

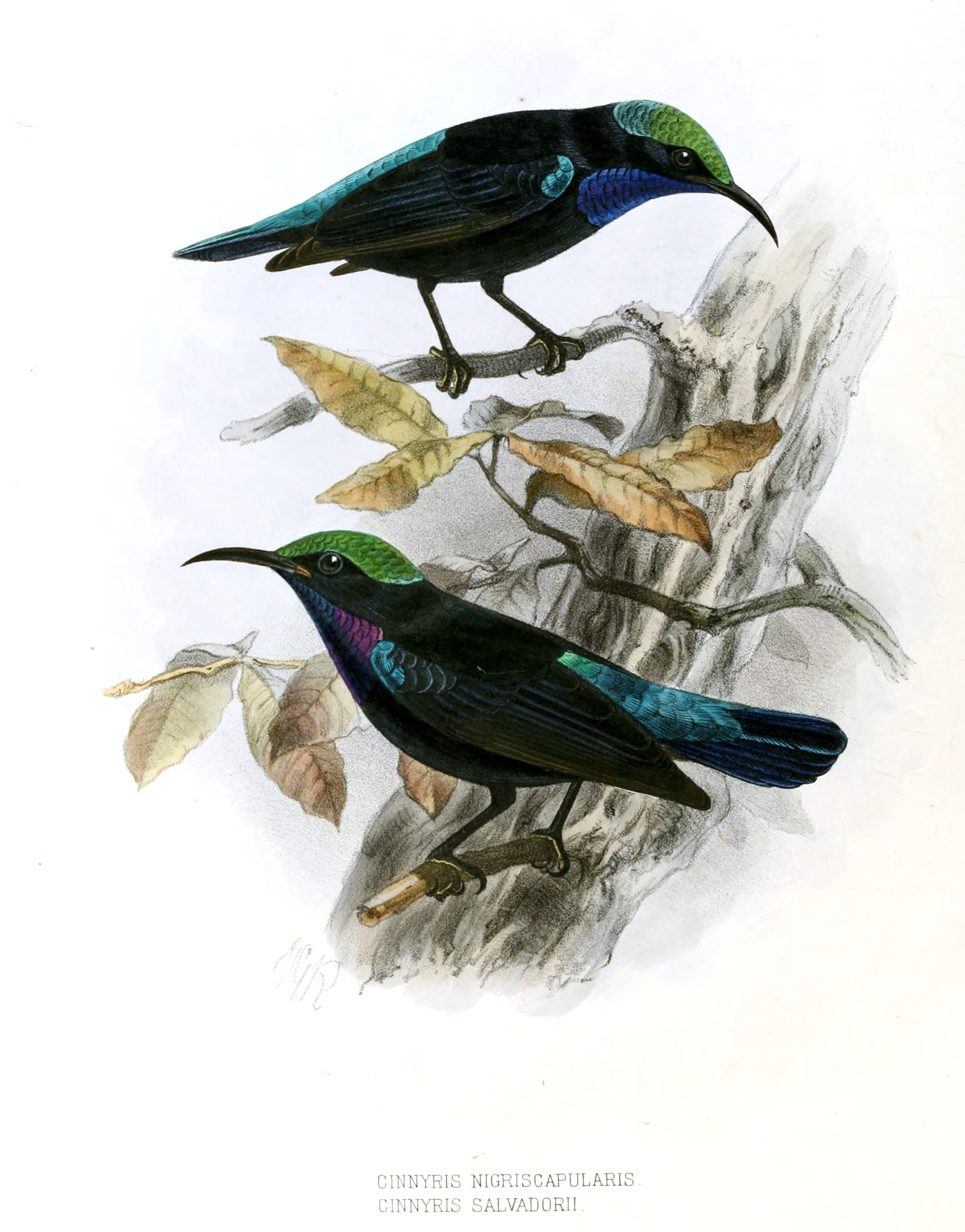
subspecies nigriscapularis & salvadorii

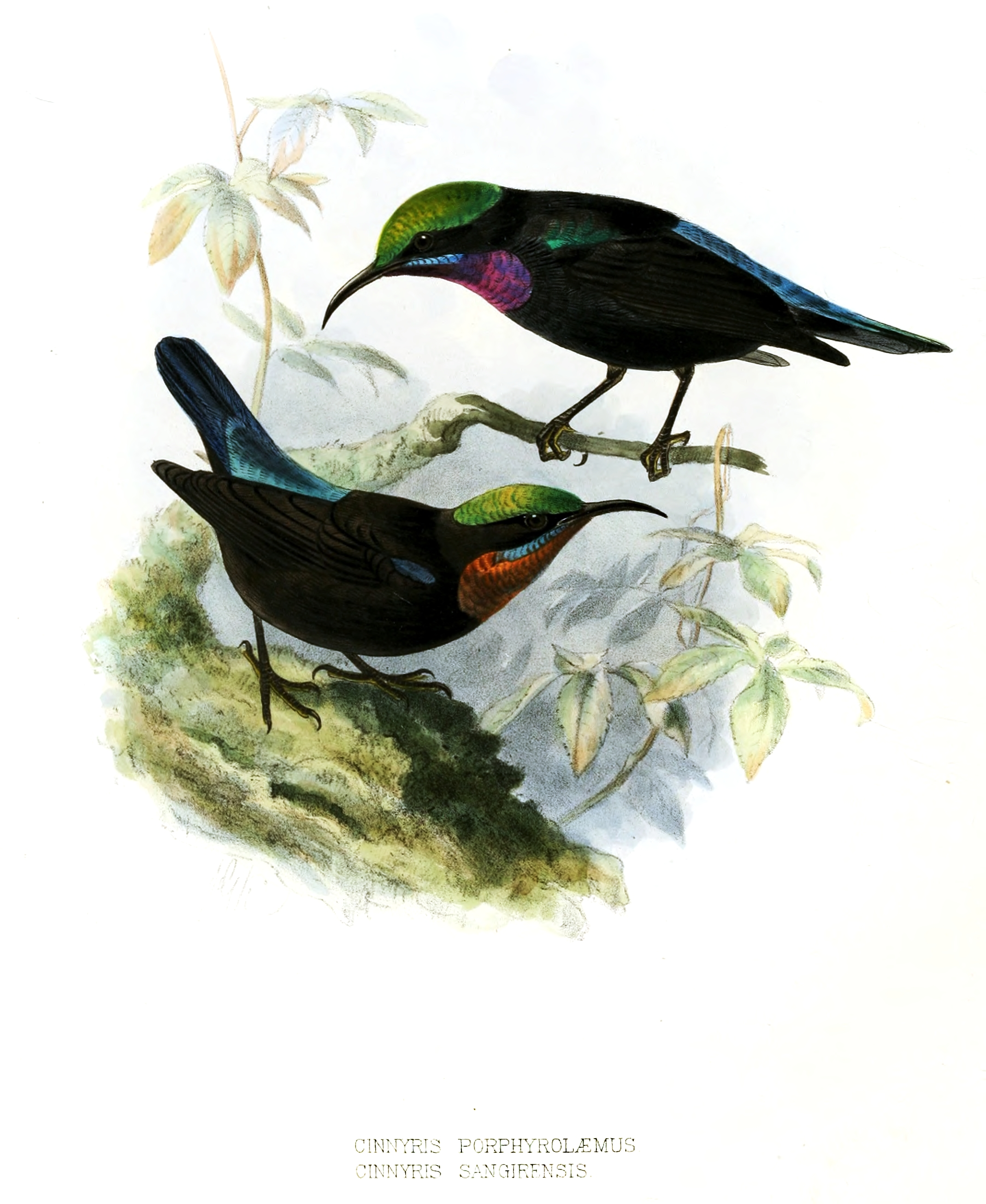
subspecies porphyrolaema & sangirensis

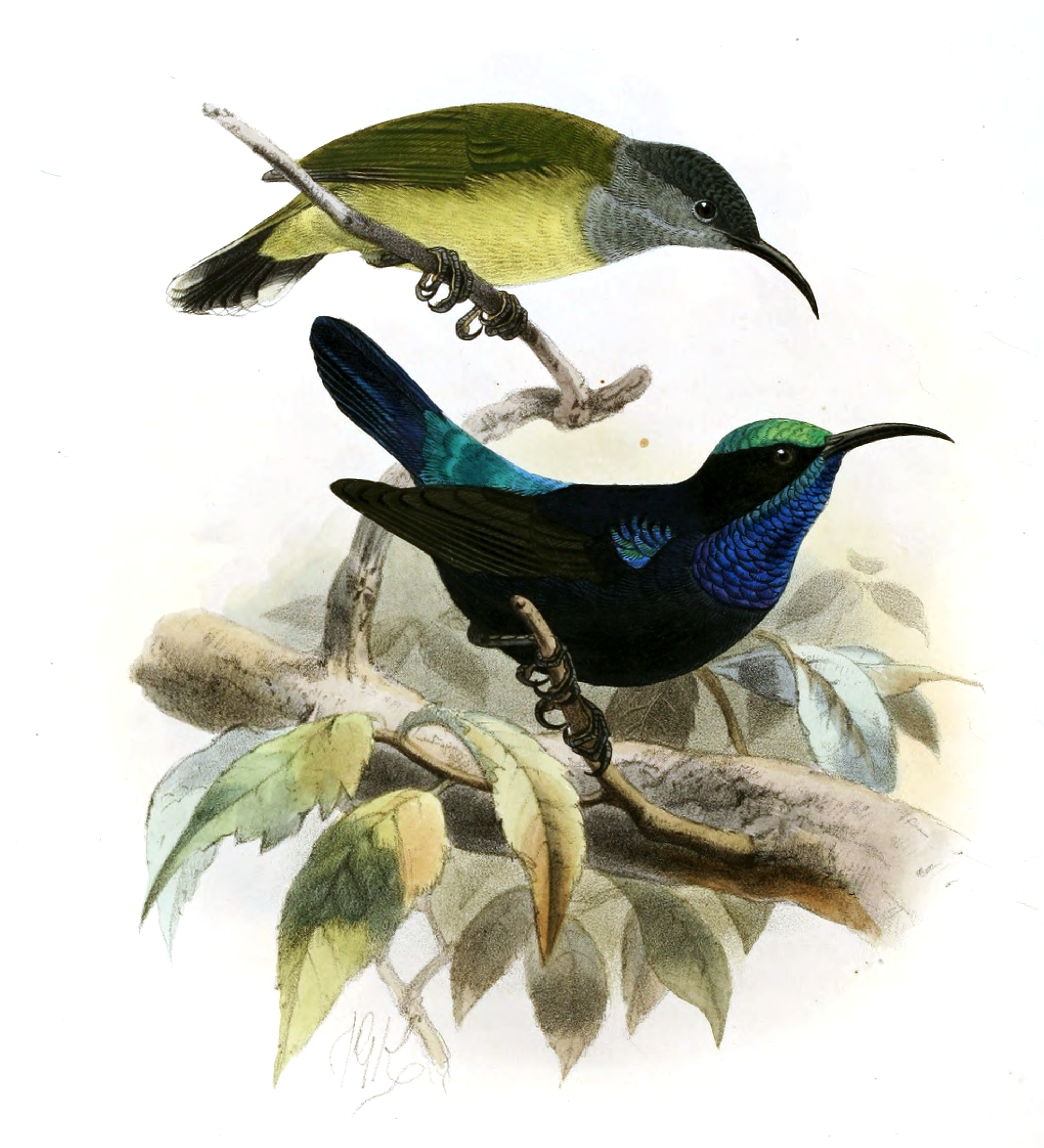
subspecies proserpina

== Subspecies ==
Twenty one subspecies are recognised:

- L. a. talautensis (Meyer, AB & Wiglesworth, 1894) – Talaud Islands (northeast of Sulawesi)
- L. a. sangirensis (Meyer, AB, 1874) – Sangihe Islands and Siau Island (north of Sulawesi)
- L. a. grayi (Wallace, 1865) – north Sulawesi
- L. a. porphyrolaema (Wallace, 1865) – central, south Sulawesi and southeast satellites
- L. a. auriceps (Gray, GR, 1861) – Banggai Island (east of Sulawesi), north, central Moluccas, Damar Island (east Lesser Sunda Islands) and Gebe (Raja Ampat Islands, northwest of New Guinea)
- L. a. auricapilla (Mees, 1965) – Kayoa (west of central Halmahera)
- L. a. aspasioides (Gray, GR, 1861) – Seram and Ambon (central east Moluccas), Watubela (south Moluccas) and Aru Islands (southwest of New Guinea)
- L. a. proserpina (Wallace, 1863) – Buru (central west Moluccas)
- L. a. chlorolaema (Salvadori, 1874) – Kai Islands (south Moluccas)
- L. a. mariae (Ripley, 1959) – Kofiau (Raja Ampat Islands, northwest of New Guinea)
- L. a. cochrani (Stresemann & Paludan, 1932) – Waigeo and Misool (Raja Ampat Islands, northwest of New Guinea)
- L. a. aspasia (Lesson, RP & Garnot, 1828) – mainland New Guinea, Yapen (Geelvink Bay islands, northwest New Guinea) and other north New Guinea satellites
- L. a. maforensis (Meyer, AB, 1874) – Numfor (Geelvink Bay islands, northwest New Guinea)
- L. a. nigriscapularis (Salvadori, 1876) – Mios Num and Rani (south of Biak, Geelvink Bay islands, northwest New Guinea)
- L. a. mysorensis (Meyer, AB, 1874) – Biak (Geelvink Bay islands, northwest New Guinea) and Schouten Islands (north of central north New Guinea)
- L. a. veronica (Mees, 1965) – Liki (Kumamba Islands, north of Sarmi, northwest New Guinea)
- L. a. cornelia (Salvadori, 1878) – Tarawai (Dogreto Bay, north of central north New Guinea)
- L. a. christianae (Tristram, 1889) – D'Entrecasteaux Archipelago, Woodlark Island and Louisiade Archipelago (except Rossel Island; east of southeast New Guinea)
- L. a. caeruleogula (Mees, 1965) – New Britain and satellites (southeast Bismarck Archipelago)
- L. a. corinna (Salvadori, 1878) – New Ireland and satellite islands from New Hanover (=New Hanover Island) east to Lihir; also Duke of York Islands (northeast Bismarck Archipelago)
- L. a. eichhorni (Rothschild & Hartert, EJO, 1926) – Feni Islands (east of New Ireland, northeast Bismarck Archipelago)
