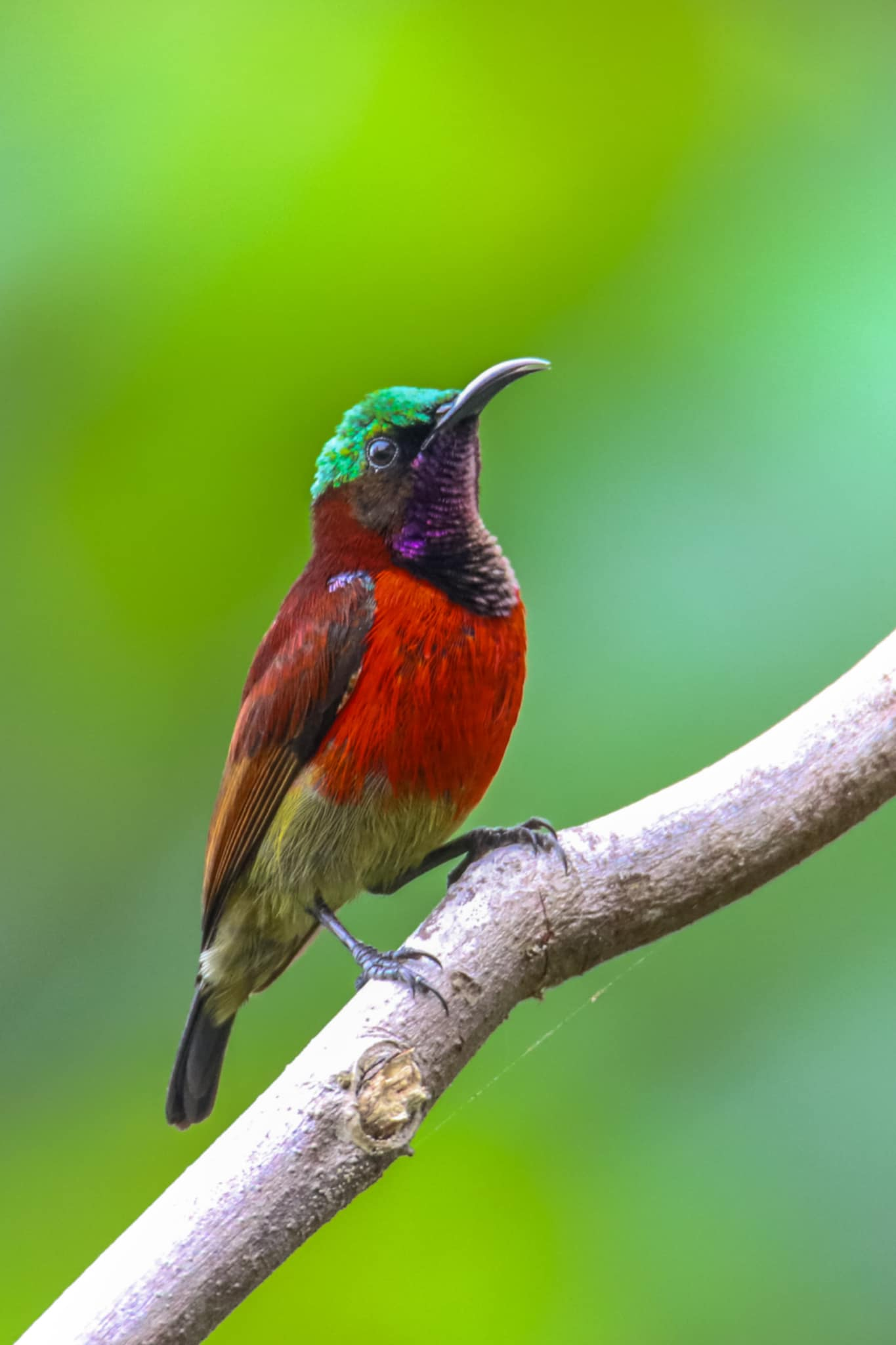
- A male ssp. trochilus
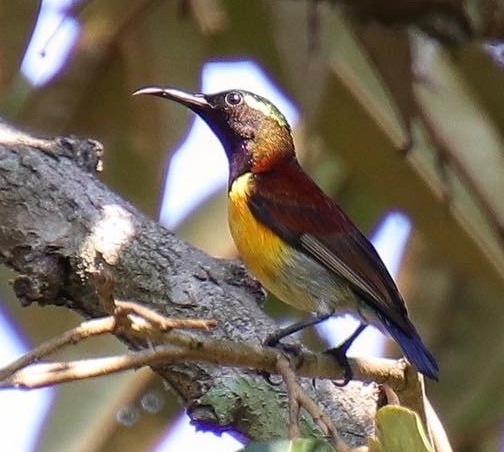
- A male ssp. juliae, also known as the Orange-lined sunbird

Conservation status
- Least Concern (IUCN 3.1)

Scientific classification
- Kingdom: Animalia
- Phylum: Chordata
- Class: Aves
- Order: Passeriformes
- Family: Nectariniidae
- Genus: Leptocoma
- Species: L. sperata

Binomial name
- Leptocoma sperata (Linnaeus, 1766)

Synonyms
- Certhia sperata Linnaeus, 1766; Nectarinia sperata (Linnaeus, 1766)

= Purple-throated sunbird =

Species of bird

The purple-throated sunbird (Leptocoma sperata), is a species of bird in the family Nectariniidae. Its natural habitats are lowland tropical forests and tropical mangrove forests of Maratua and the Philippines.

The Van Hasselt's sunbird was previously considered conspecific.

== Description and taxonomy ==
EBird describes it as "A very small bird of wooded areas from the lowlands to lower elevations in the mountains. Male has dark upperparts with a greenish crown and rump, a deep purple throat and upper chest, and a bright red lower chest and upper belly. In Sulu and west Mindanao birds, the red on the chest is replaced by yellow with an orange wash. Male is distinctive. Female resembles several other drab female sunbirds, but has a yellow brow and chest and a brown wing. Call is a sharp upslurred "tsweep!""

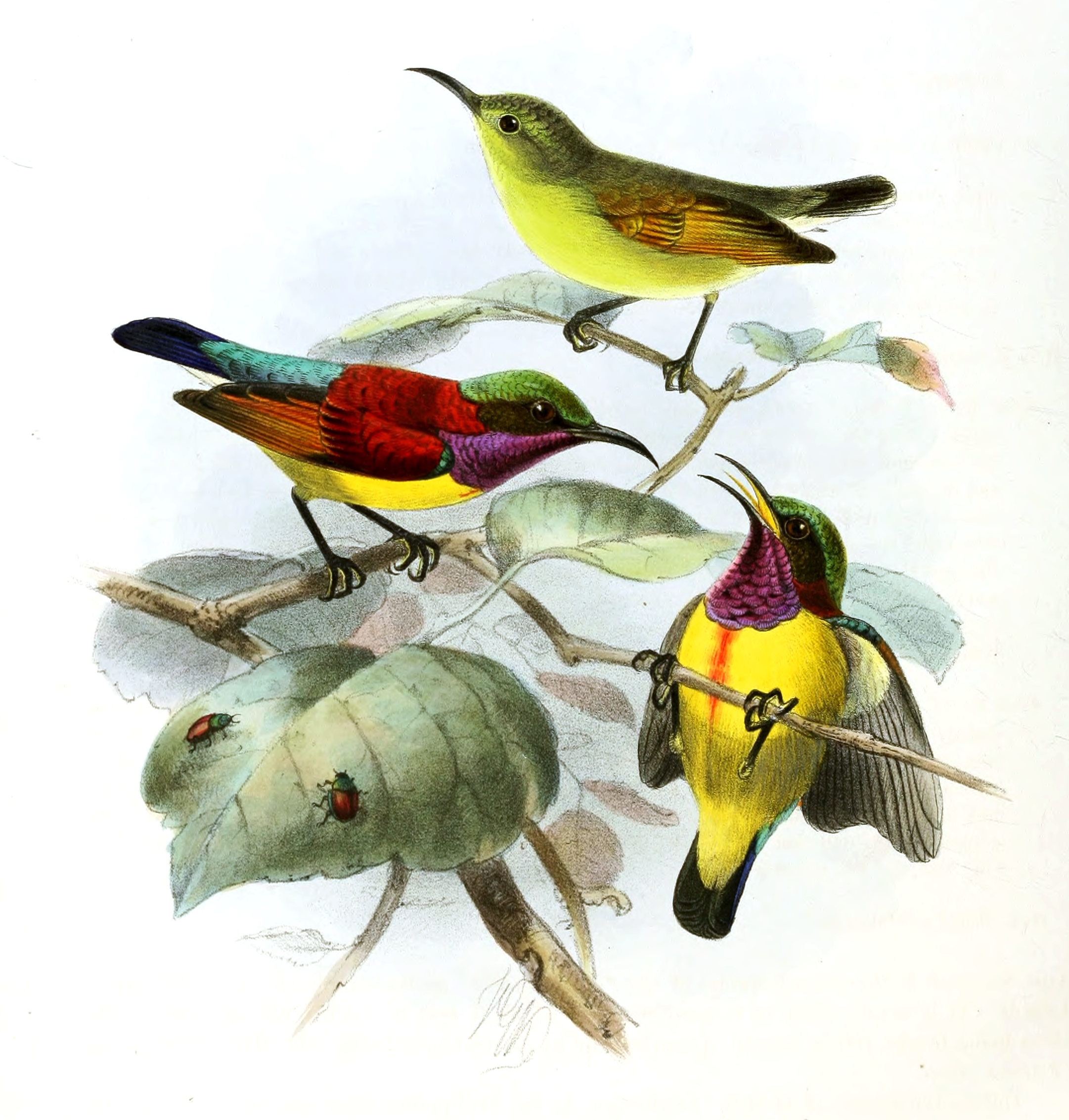
Illustration of subspecies ''L. s. juliae''

In 1760 the French zoologist Mathurin Jacques Brisson included a description of the purple-throated sunbird in his Ornithologie based on a specimen collected in the Philippines. He used the French name Le grimpereau pourpré des Philippines and the Latin Certhia Philippensis Purpurea. Although Brisson coined Latin names, these do not conform to the binomial system and are not recognised by the International Commission on Zoological Nomenclature. When in 1766 the Swedish naturalist Carl Linnaeus updated his Systema Naturae for the twelfth edition, he added 240 species that had been previously described by Brisson. One of these was the purple-throated sunbird. Linnaeus included a brief description, coined the binomial name Certhia sperata and cited Brisson's work. Linnaeus specified the type location as the Philippines but this was subsequently restricted to Manila. The specific name sperata is Latin for "bride" or "betrothed". The species is now placed in the genus Leptocoma was introduced by the German ornithologist Jean Cabanis in 1850.

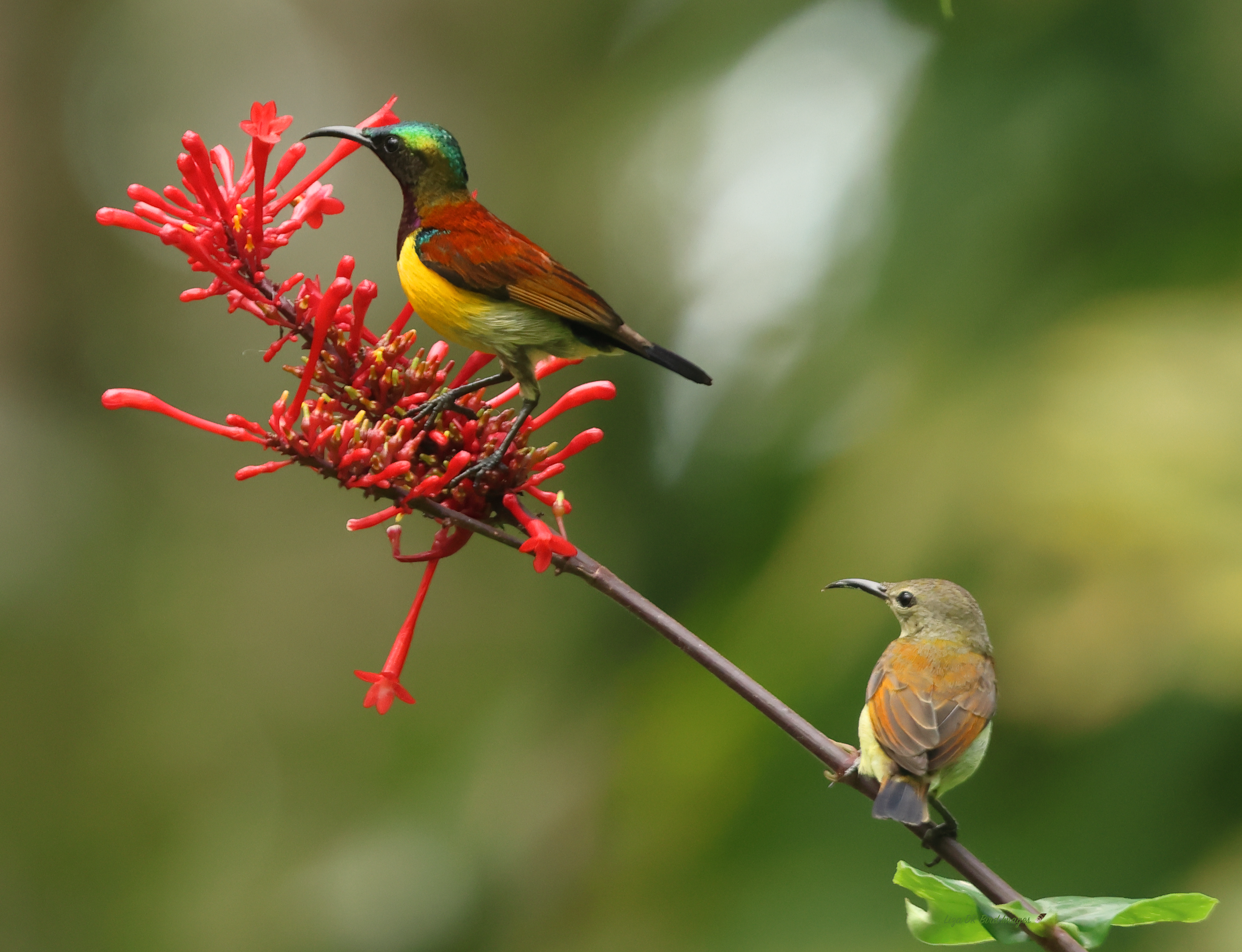
A pair of Orange-lined sunbird. Male on the left and female on the right

Four subspecies are recognised:

- L. s. henkei (Meyer, AB, 1884) – north Luzon
- L. s. sperata (Linnaeus, 1766) – central and south Luzon, Polillo Island, Marinduque and Catanduanes (north Philippines)
- L. s. trochilus (Salomonsen, 1953) – west, central and south Philippines (except west and south Mindanao and Sulu Archipelago)
- L. s. juliae (Tweeddale, 1877) – west and south Mindanao and Sulu Archipelago

The subspecies juliae is split under Handbook of the Birds of the World as Orange-lined sunbird.

== Ecology and behavior ==
Feeds largely on nectar, although they will also take insects, especially when feeding young. Flight is fast and direct on their short wings. Most species can take nectar by hovering like a hummingbird, but usually perch to feed most of the time.

Breeds from December to May. Only one nest has been described. This nest was attached to the tip of a fern and tear-drop shaped It was made of a tangle of dried leaves and stems and had a side entrance and contained 2 eggs.

== Habitat and conservation status ==
Its natural habitats at tropical moist lowland primary forest and secondary forest, gardens and plantations mostly in the lowlands.

The IUCN Red List has assessed this bird as least-concern species although it is poorly known. It is common across its range and seems to tolerate more disturbed habitats.
