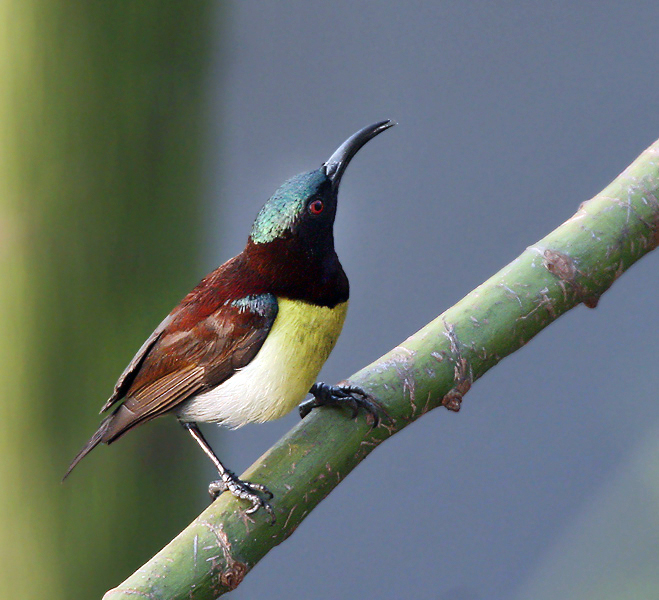
- Male purple-rumped sunbird (Leptocoma zeylonica)

Scientific classification
- Kingdom: Animalia
- Phylum: Chordata
- Class: Aves
- Order: Passeriformes
- Family: Nectariniidae
- Genus: Leptocoma; Cabanis, 1851

Type species
- Nectarinia hasseltii Temminck, 1825

Species
- See text

= Leptocoma =

Genus of birds

Leptocoma is a genus of sunbirds found from tropical South Asia to Papua New Guinea. Its members are sometimes included in Nectarinia.

The sunbirds are a group of very small Old World passerine birds which feed largely on nectar, although they will also take insects, especially when feeding young. Flight is fast and direct on their short wings. Most species can take nectar by hovering like a hummingbird, but usually perch to feed.

== Taxonomy ==
The genus was introduced by the German ornithologist Jean Cabanis in 1850 with the type species as Nectarinia hasseltii Temminck 1825, a junior synonym of Certhia brasiliana Gmelin, JF, 1788, Van Hasselt's sunbird. The name Leptocoma combines the Ancient Greek words leptos "delicate" or "fine" and komē "hair".

Its six species in the genus are:

Male	Female	Common name	Scientific name	Distribution
		Purple-rumped sunbird	Leptocoma zeylonica	India, Sri Lanka and Bangladesh
		Crimson-backed sunbird	Leptocoma minima	Western Ghats of India
		Purple-throated sunbird	Leptocoma sperata	the Philippines
		Van Hasselt's sunbird	Leptocoma brasiliana	Northeast India, Bangladesh and Southeast Asia
		Black sunbird	Leptocoma aspasia	eastern Indonesia and New Guinea
		Copper-throated sunbird	Leptocoma calcostetha	Brunei, Cambodia, Indonesia, Malaysia, Myanmar, the Philippines, Thailand, and Vietnam
