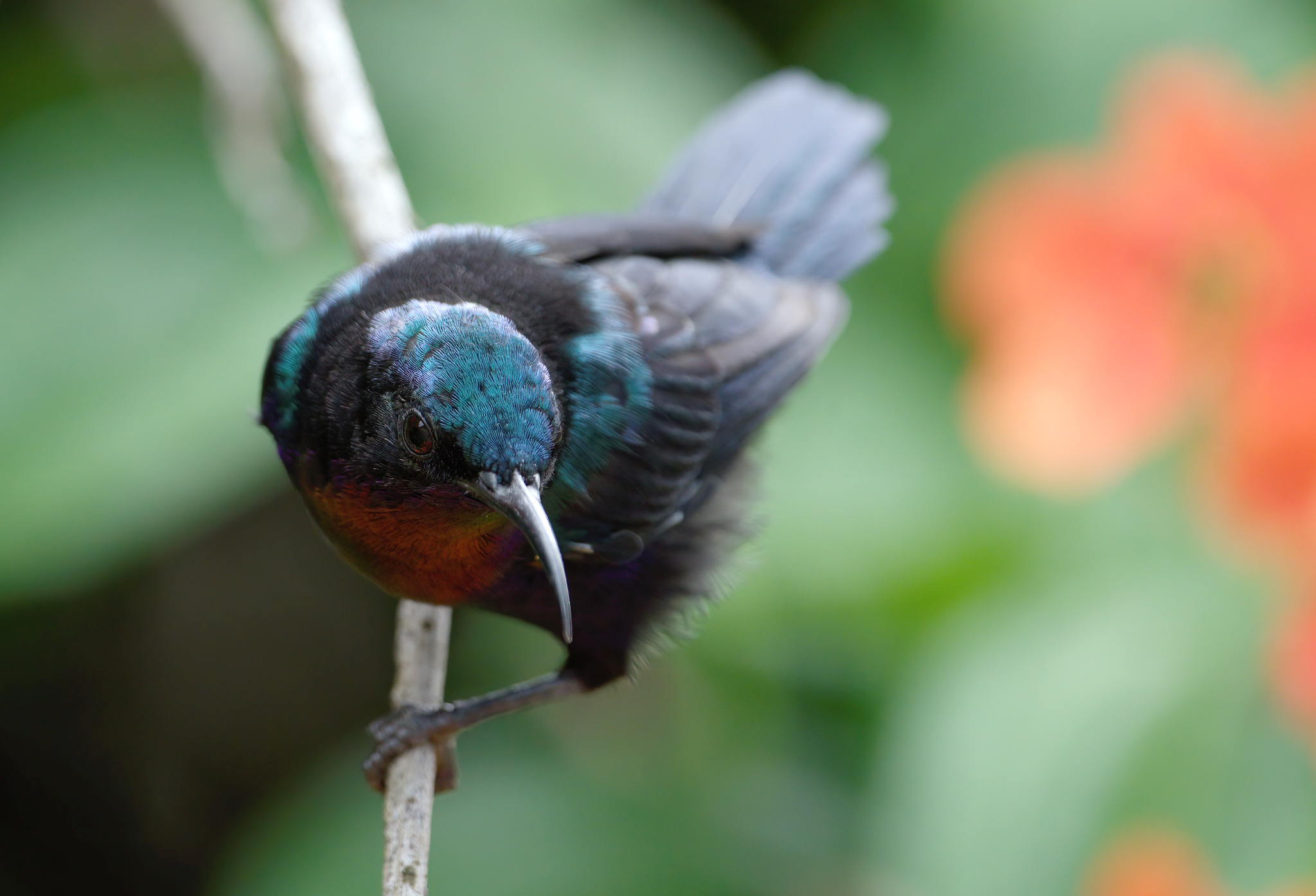
- male
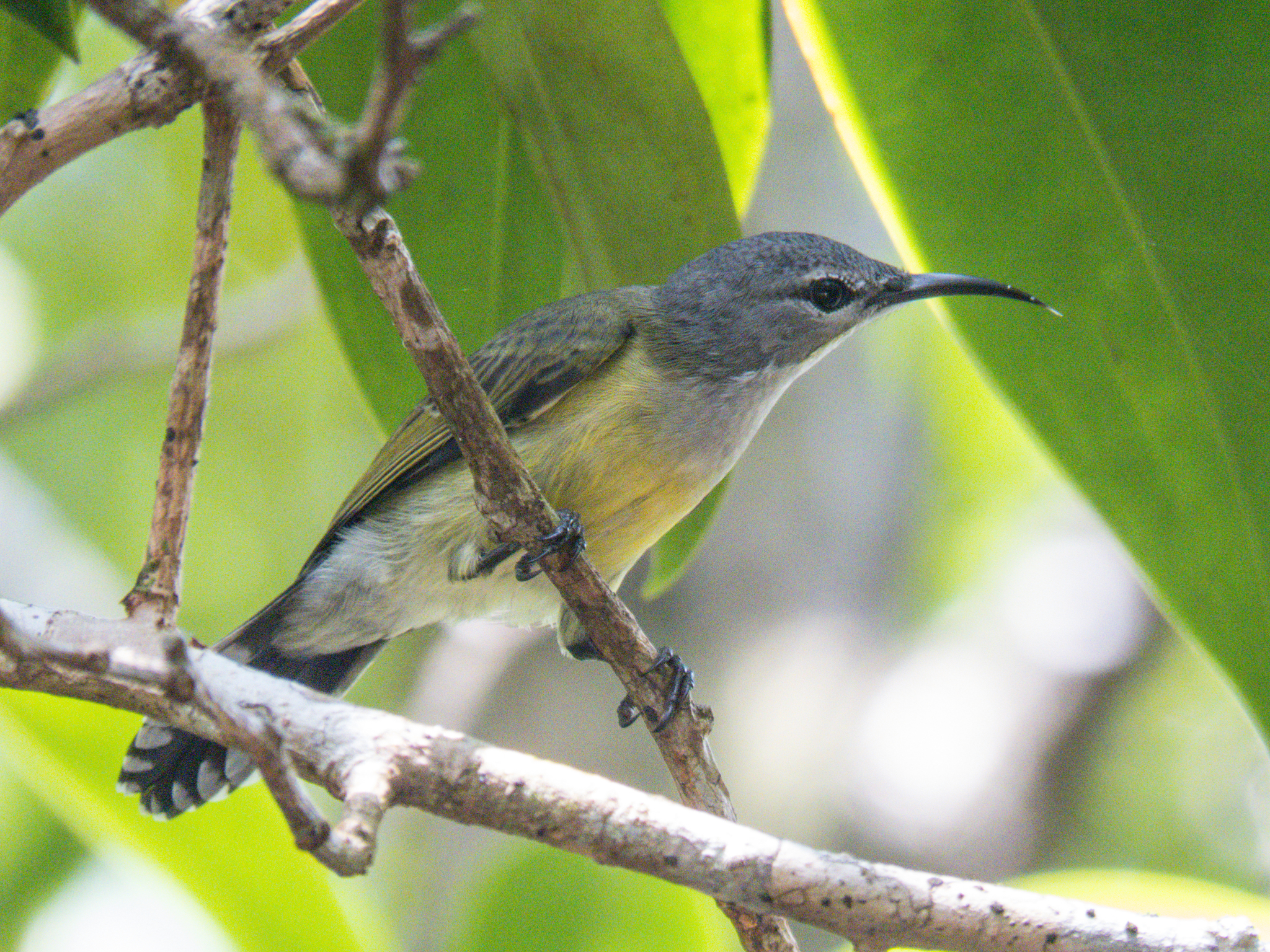
- female

Conservation status
- Least Concern (IUCN 3.1)

Scientific classification
- Kingdom: Animalia
- Phylum: Chordata
- Class: Aves
- Order: Passeriformes
- Family: Nectariniidae
- Genus: Leptocoma
- Species: L. calcostetha

Binomial name
- Leptocoma calcostetha (Jardine, 1842)

Synonyms
- Nectarinia calcostetha

= Copper-throated sunbird =

Species of bird

The copper-throated sunbird (Leptocoma calcostetha) is a small passerine within the Nectariniidae family. They sustain themselves by consuming nectar as well as small invertebrates. As a member of the Nectariniidae family, they possess downward curved beaks and have pectoral tufts of yellow feathers. They are found in south-eastern Asia, predominantly in coastal regions.

== Taxonomy ==
The copper-throated sunbirds are within the Nectariniidae family, a grouping of sunbirds and spiderhunters. These birds are known for their nectarivorous diets, downward-curved beaks and colorful plumage. The copper-throated sunbird is within the small genus Leptocoma, which contains only 6 extant species. Leptocoma originates from the ancient Greek words leptos which means delicate or refined; and komē which means hair. In addition, the species name calcostetha originates from the words khalkos which means bronze; and stēthos which means breast. Sunbird species can be found in Africa, Asia and Australia. The current consensus is that sunbirds originated and speciated within Asia, and then spread to other continents over time.

== Description ==
Copper-throated sunbirds are small sized birds ranging from 12.2–13 cm. A mature individual's wingspan averages 57.5mm, while their tails average 45.5mm. Adult males are predominantly black birds with contrasting shimmering green on their heads, shoulders, upper back and rump; as well as a copper colored throat with an outer ring of shimmering purplish-blue that extends down to the chest. They possess black legs and black eyes with no eye ring. They boast a down-curved black beak and yellow pectoral tufts which is concealed beneath the wing; both of which are shared traits by many other species in the Nectariniidae family. Additionally, adult females also have black legs and a down-curved black beak, but their eyes possess an incomplete white eye ring. Their undersides are olive-yellow whilst their backsides are grayish-olive. The iconic copper throat is replaced with a grayish-white color which contrasts their gray heads. Juveniles are similar to the females, however, the grayish-white throats are swapped for a yellow one with occasional dark scaling.

== Distribution and habitat ==
Copper-throated sunbirds' distribution spans across south eastern Asia. They can be found in Singapore, Vietnam, Malaysia, the Philippines, Myanmar, Cambodia and western Indonesia (i.e. Java Island). They predominantly reside in coastal areas year-round rather than far into the mainland. Copper-throated sunbirds reside in artificial and forest habitat types. More specifically, their artificial habitats consist of plantations, coconut groves and rural gardens. Whereas, forest habitats consist of tropical lowlands, tropical mangroves, heath forests and alluvial forests. They are often found in flowering shrubs or trees, usually keeping themselves in the upper-middle stories of the canopy.

== Behavior ==
=== Diet ===
Copper-throated sunbirds are nectivorous and insectivorous species. They are highly active birds that dart from tree to tree looking for small arthropods and nectar. Unlike their convergently evolved counterpart, the hummingbird, sunbirds have the ability to hover imperfectly long enough to consume nectar. However, they cannot do it continuously. The only dietary preference documented for the copper-throated sunbirds is nectar from Bruguiera; a class of plants within the Rhizophoraceae family which can be found in mangroves in Africa, Asia and Australia. As for arthropods, they are collected through means of gleaning through twigs and foliage.

=== Pollination ===
As a nectarivore, these birds as well as most sunbirds are important pollinators in their ecosystem. While collecting nectar, parts of their bodies graze the anthers of the flower: the male sexual organs of the flower which releases pollen. By traveling between multiple different flowers, they bring pollen straight to other female sexual organs which causes the plant to become fertilized. In some cases, it has been documented that sunbirds cause reduced reproductive success. It is common for birds to damage the flowers' reproductive organs, ruining their chances to become fertilized.

=== Reproduction ===
Egg laying begins as early as January and finishes as late as July. Typical clutch size is 2. The eggs are grayish-brown with dark spots. Nestlings start to appear around the month of July. Nest building is a cooperative effect between the male and the female. The nest is loosely woven into a pear-shaped structure using fine grass, fibers and hairs, rendering it camouflaged with the bark and leaves. It has a solid base and an oval entrance with an overhang. Occasionally, the parents build decoy nests, most likely to confuse predators and brood parasites such as cuckoos. Cuckoo species are brood parasites that often target sunbirds nests in Eastern Asia and Africa.

=== Vocalization ===
Their songs are a melodious trill of fluctuating notes, sounding almost squeaky, broken up by brief pauses and a single sharp squeak. Their calls are squee- sound, that subtly decreases in pitch. No documentation could be found on copper-throated sunbirds' utilization of their vocalizations.

== Conservation status ==
The copper-throated sunbird was classified as a species of least concern by the International Union for Conservation of Nature in October 2016. Although their populations are yet to be quantified, they have been deemed not uncommon. Due to the lack of evidence of declining populations and their large distribution range, it must indicate that their populations are stable.

== Gallery ==
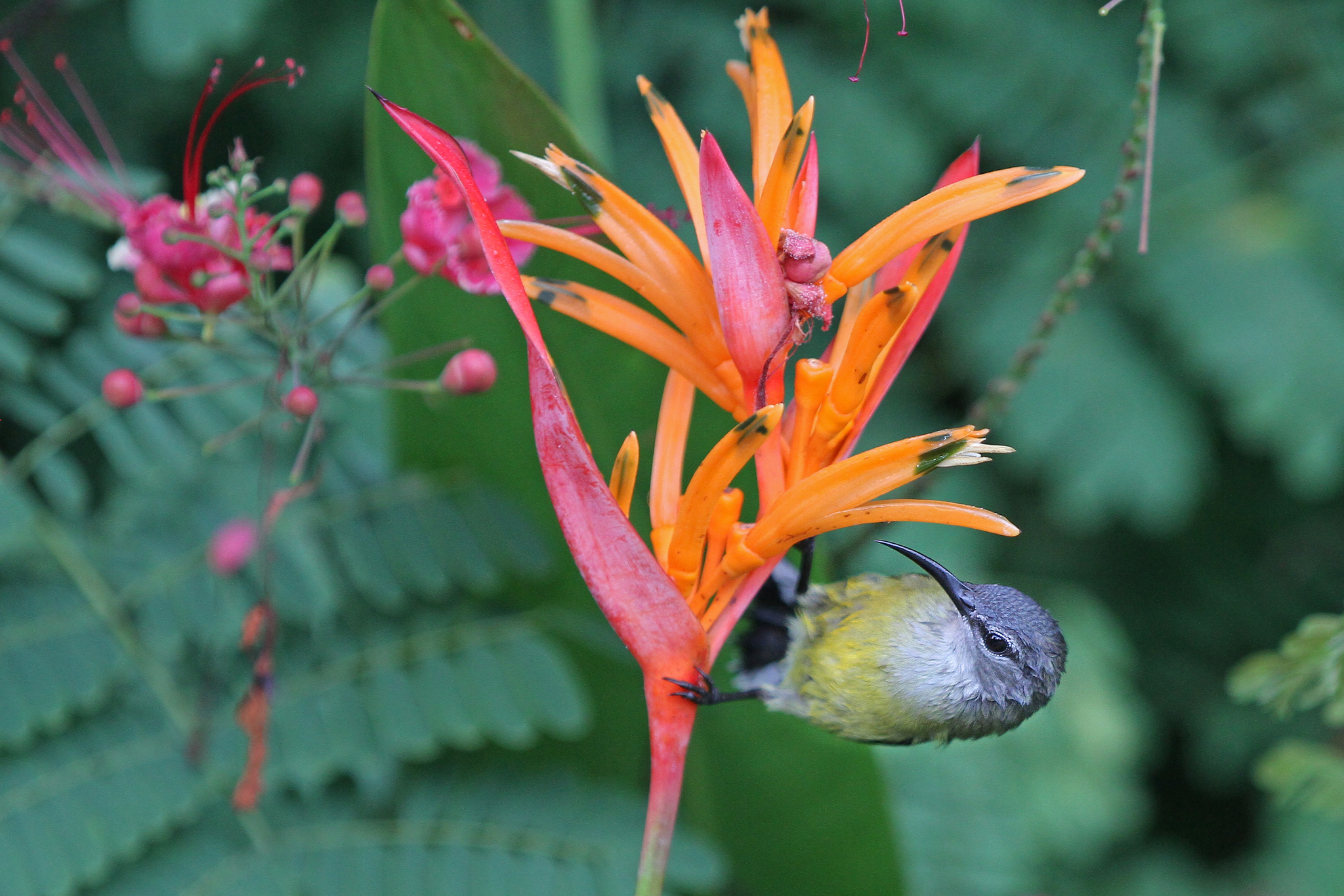
female feeding on flower

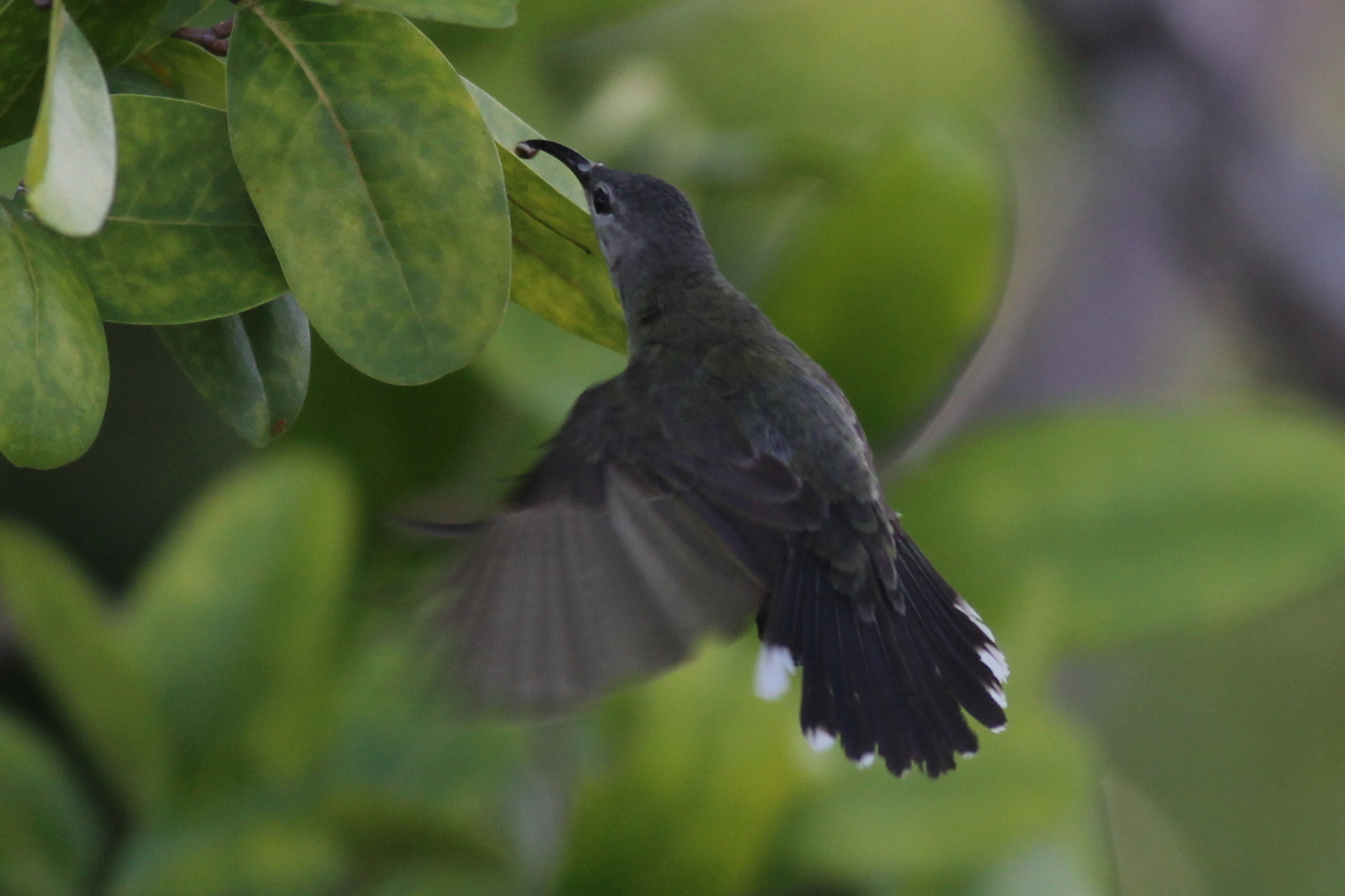
female gleaning insect off leaf

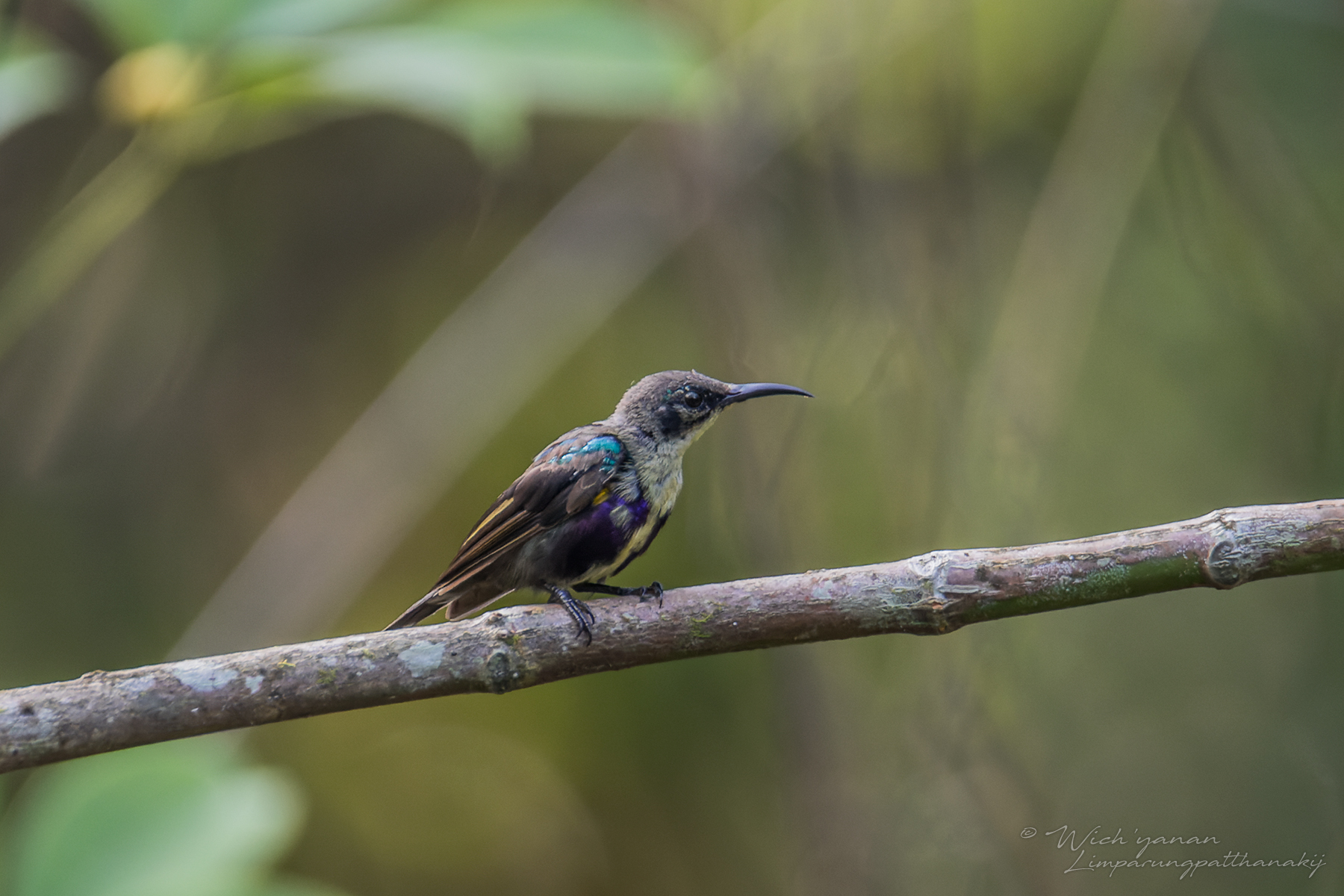
eclipse male
