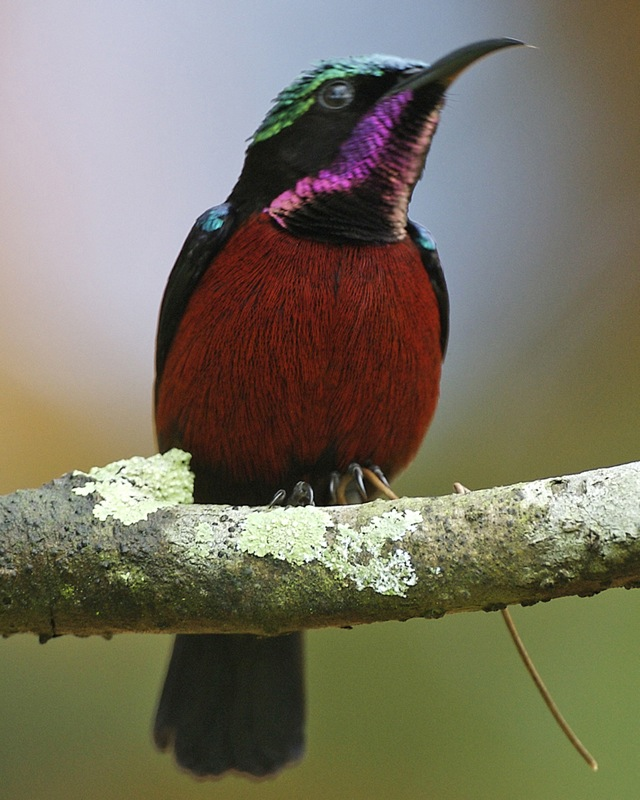
- Male

Conservation status
- Least Concern (IUCN 3.1)

Scientific classification
- Kingdom: Animalia
- Phylum: Chordata
- Class: Aves
- Order: Passeriformes
- Family: Nectariniidae
- Genus: Leptocoma
- Species: L. brasiliana

Binomial name
- Leptocoma brasiliana (Gmelin, JF, 1788)

= Van Hasselt's sunbird =

Species of bird

Van Hasselt's sunbird (Leptocoma brasiliana), is a species of bird in the family Nectariniidae. It is found in Northeast India, Bangladesh and Southeast Asia. Its natural habitats are subtropical or tropical moist lowland forests and subtropical or tropical mangrove forests.

== Taxonomy ==
Van Hasselt's sunbird was described and illustrated in 1760 by the French zoologist Mathurin Jacques Brisson. He introduced the French name "Le grimpereau violet de Brésil" in the mistakenly belief that his specimen had been collected in Brazil. When the German naturalist Johann Friedrich Gmelin revised and expanded Carl Linnaeus's Systema Naturae in 1788 he included Van Hasselt's sunbird using Brisson's account. He placed it with the tree-creepers in the genus Certhia and coined the binomial name Certhia brasiliana. He specified the location as Brazil and cited Brisson's book. In 1825 the Dutch zoologist Coenraad Jacob Temminck described and illustrated Van Hasselt's sunbird based on a specimen that had been collected on the island of Java by Johan Conrad van Hasselt. Temminck coined the binomial name Nectarinia hasseltii, choosing the specific epithet to honour the collector. Under the rules of the International Commission on Zoological Nomenclature Gmelin's epithet has priority and Temminck's name is a junior synonym. The type location has been redesignated as Java.

Van Hasselt's sunbird is now one of six species placed in the genus Leptocoma that was introduced in 1850 by the German ornithologist Jean Cabanis. The species was formerly considered conspecific with the purple-throated sunbird (Leptocoma sperata).

Five subspecies are recognised:

- L. b. brasiliana (Gmelin, JF, 1788) – northeast India and east Bangladesh to Malay Peninsula, Sumatra, islands west of Sumatra (except Simeulue), west Java and Borneo
- L. b. emmae Delacour & Jabouille, 1928 – south Indochina
- L. b. mecynorhyncha (Oberholser, 1912) – Simeulue (west of Sumatra)
- L. b. eumecis (Oberholser, 1917) – Anambas Islands (east of Malay Peninsula)
- L. b. axantha (Oberholser, 1932) – Natuna Islands (northwest of Borneo)

In 1939, a group of bird lovers in Hawaii known as the Hui Manu released 28 of these birds on various parts of the leeward side of Oahu in Hawaii in an attempt to get them to become established there; none appeared to have succeeded.
