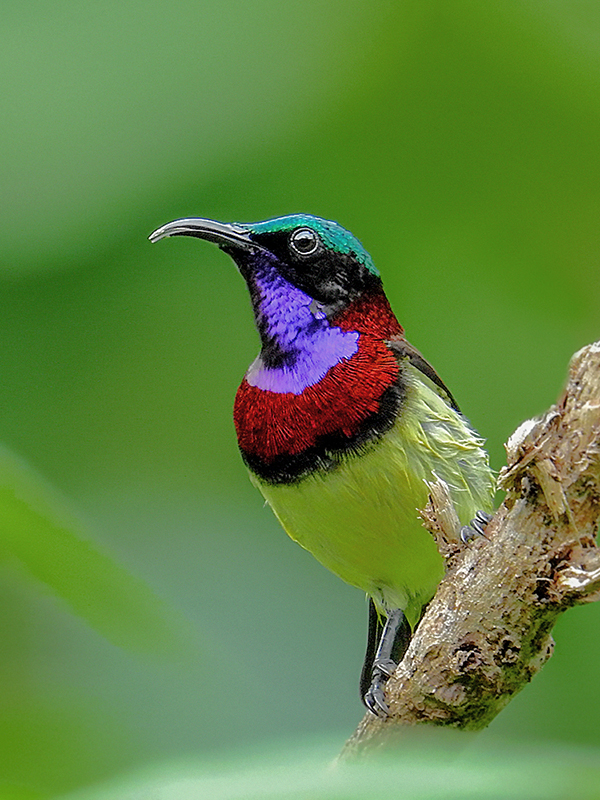
- Male in Mangaon, Raigad, Maharashtra Calls

Conservation status
- Least Concern (IUCN 3.1)

Scientific classification
- Kingdom: Animalia
- Phylum: Chordata
- Class: Aves
- Order: Passeriformes
- Family: Nectariniidae
- Genus: Leptocoma
- Species: L. minima

Binomial name
- Leptocoma minima (Sykes, 1832)
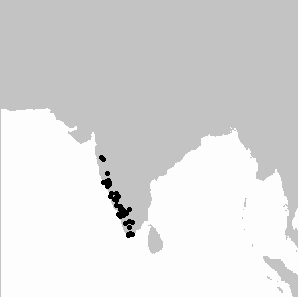

Synonyms
- Nectarinia minima

= Crimson-backed sunbird =

Species of bird

The crimson-backed sunbird or small sunbird (Leptocoma minima) is a sunbird endemic to the Western Ghats of India. Like other sunbirds, they feed mainly on nectar although they take insects, especially to feed their young. They are tiny birds that are resident and are found in forests but are particularly attracted to gardens at the edge of the forest where people grow suitable flower-bearing plants. They usually perch while taking nectar.

== Description ==
Crimson-backed sunbirds are tiny, even by sunbird standards, and are only 8 cm long. They have medium-length thin down-curved bills and brush-tipped tubular tongues, both adaptations for nectar feeding.

The adult male is velvety red on the mantle and wing coverts and there is a broad red breast band. The crown is shiny green and there are pink-violet patches on the throat and rump. The underside from the breast below is yellowish. There is a black edge to the bib that separates the yellow of the underside. The larger purple-rumped sunbird can appear very similar but this sunbird has a darker maroon on the upper side while the flanks and vent are whitish. The eclipse plumage (non-breeding) of the male has more olive on the head and velvet red is restricted to the lower mantle and wing coverts. The female is olive-brown but the rump is distinctly red. They are attracted to flower-rich gardens at the edges of forests or plantations.

The calls include short chik calls and longer chee-chee-which-chee.

== Behaviour and ecology ==
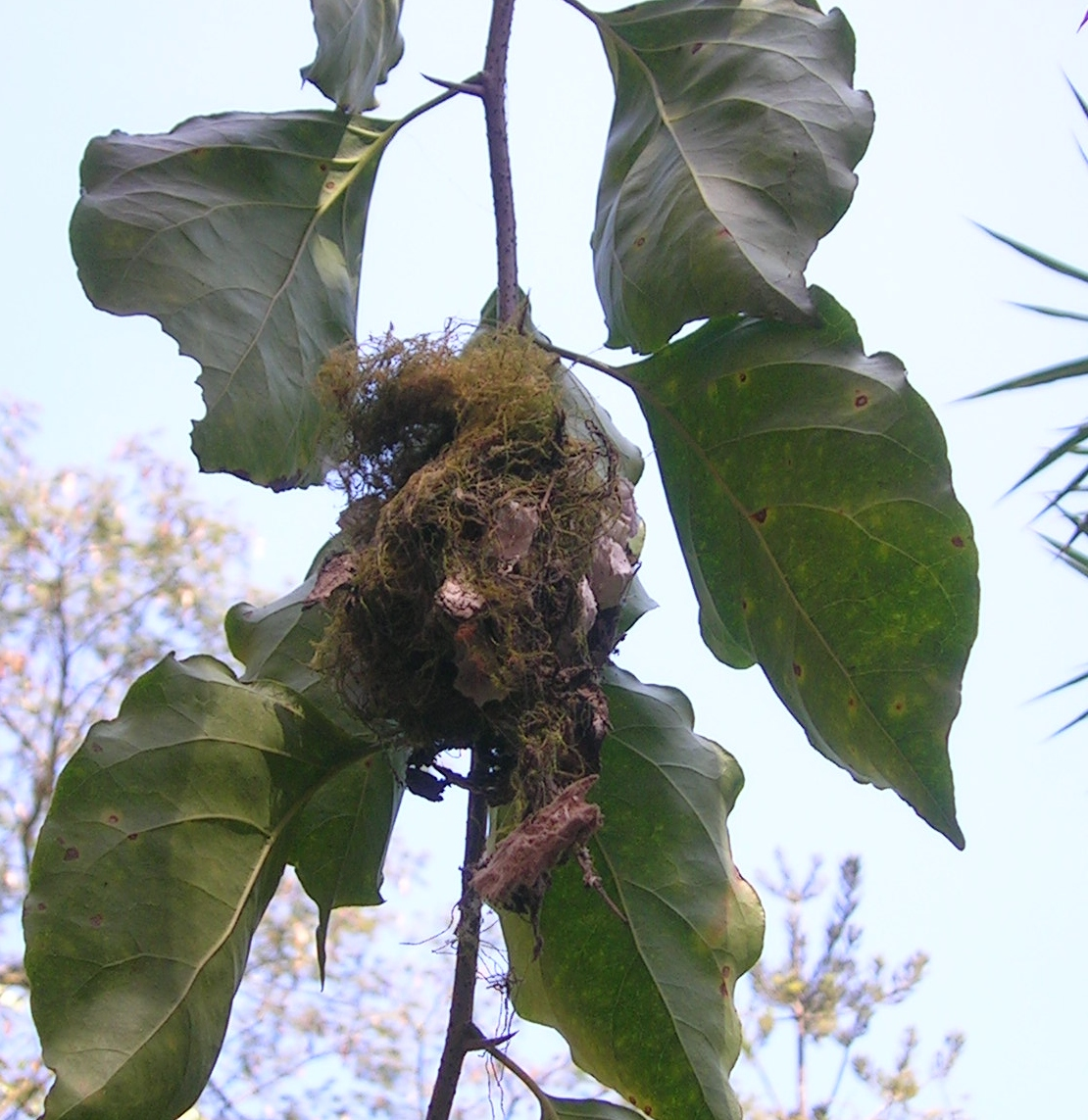
Nest of a crimson-backed sunbird

The crimson-backed sunbird is an endemic resident breeder in the Western Ghats of India. The peak nesting season is December to March, but has been known to nest in nearly all months of the year in the southern Western Ghats. Two eggs are laid in a suspended nest on a thin drooping branch of low tree, fern frond or shrub. Both the male and female take part in nest building with the interior mainly built by the female. The eggs are mainly incubated by the female but males may involve themselves in feeding the young. The incubation period is about 18–19 days.

These birds are important pollinators of some plant species.

Males establish and defend feeding territories on flower bearing shrubs and trees. Plants such as Helixanthera intermedia which had a lot of nectar were defended more vigorously. Being small birds they may be killed by attack from insects like praying mantises too.

Although resident in many areas, they may make altitudinal movements in response to rains. In some areas they move to the foothills during the monsoons and move to the higher regions after the rains.
