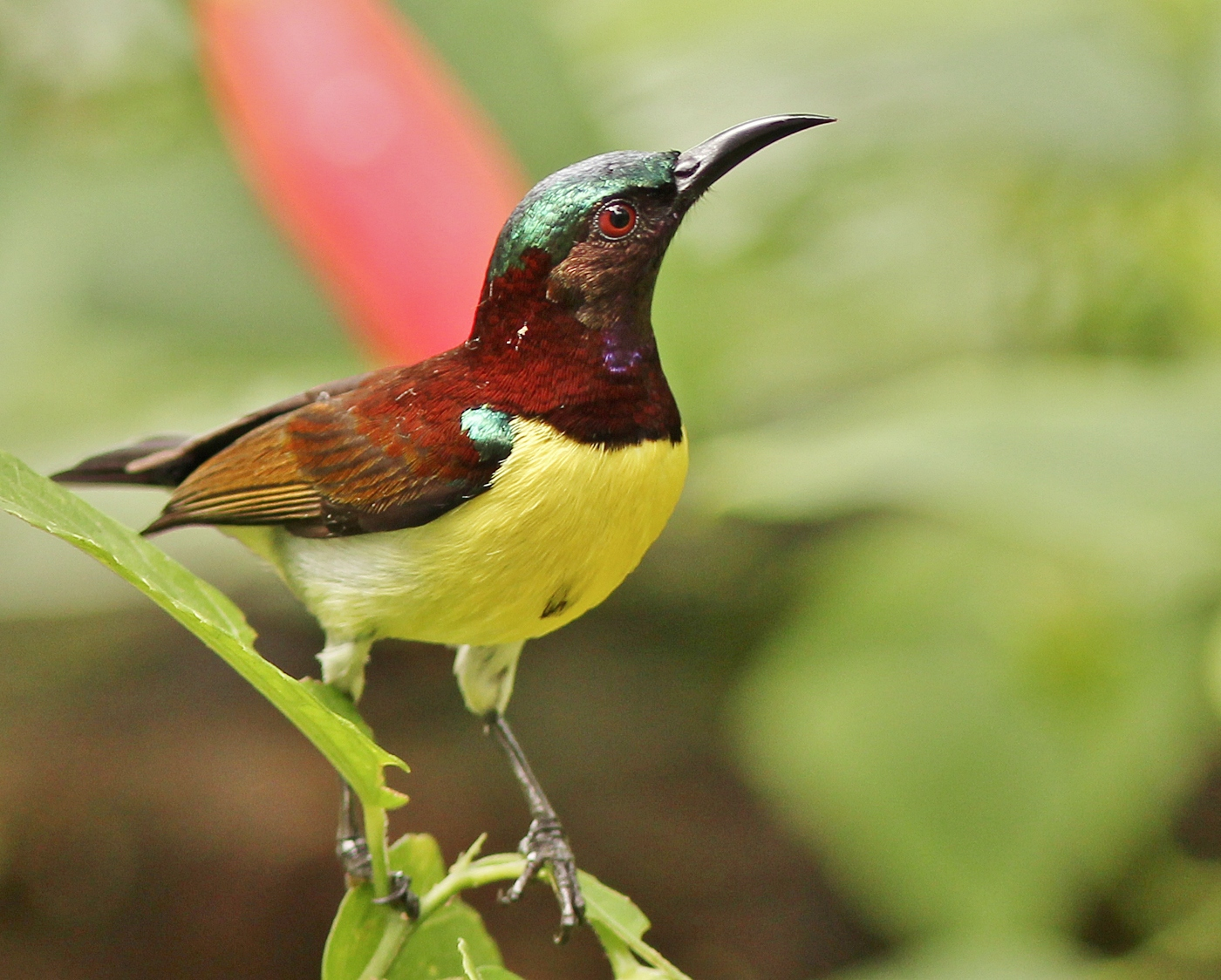
- Male
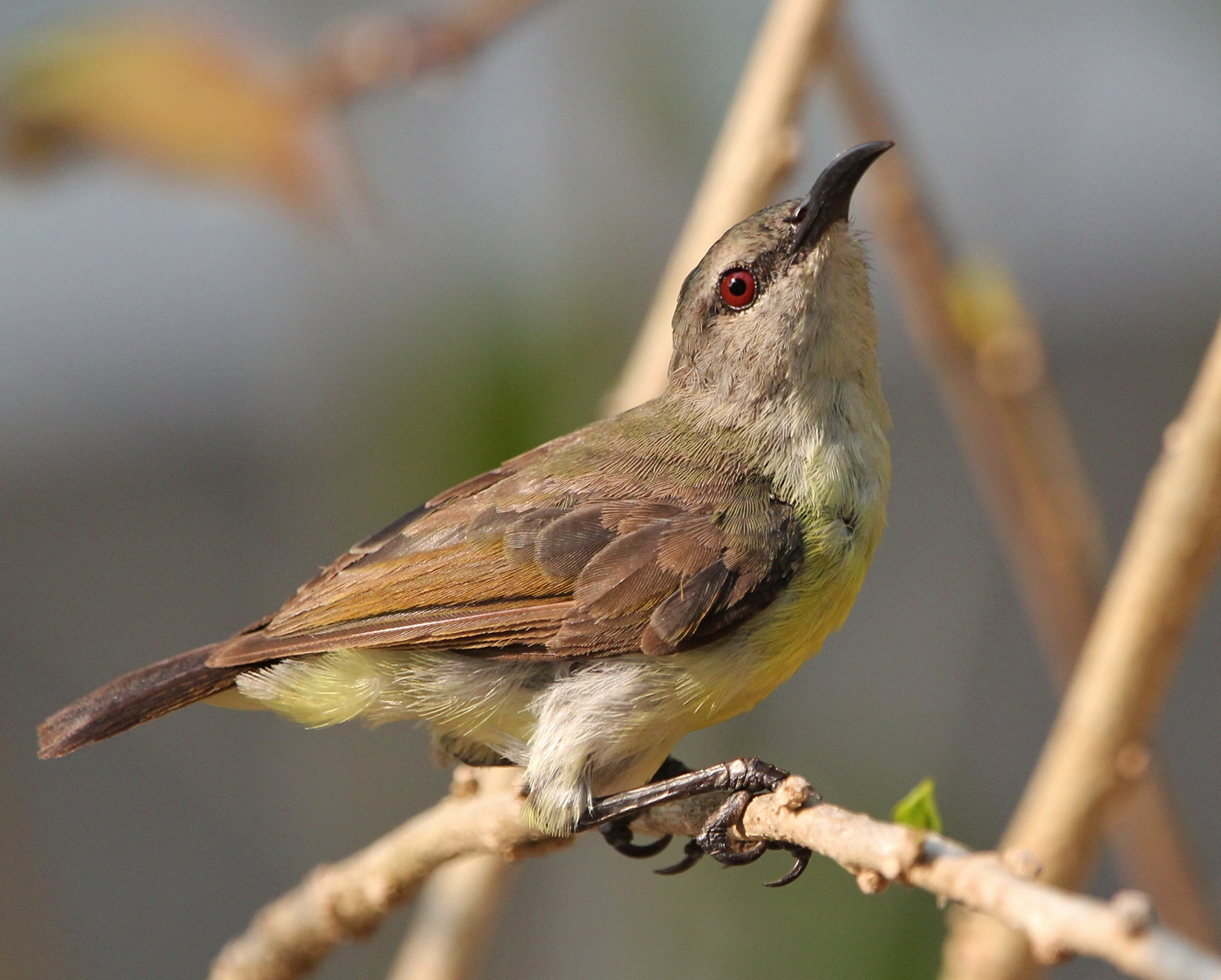
- Female

Conservation status
- Least Concern (IUCN 3.1)

Scientific classification
- Kingdom: Animalia
- Phylum: Chordata
- Class: Aves
- Order: Passeriformes
- Family: Nectariniidae
- Genus: Leptocoma
- Species: L. zeylonica

Binomial name
- Leptocoma zeylonica (Linnaeus, 1766)
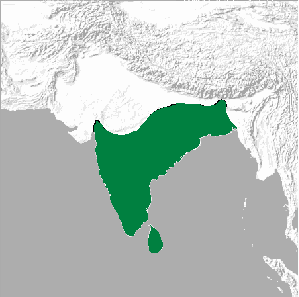
- Distribution of purple-rumped sunbird

Synonyms
- Certhia zeylonica Linnaeus, 1766; Arachnechthra zeylonica (Linnaeus, 1766); Chalcostetha zeylonica (Linnaeus, 1766); Cinnyris sola Vieillot, 1819; Cyrtostomus zeylonicus (Linnaeus, 1766); Nectarinia zeylonica (Linnaeus, 1766)

Audio
- Calls

= Purple-rumped sunbird =

Species of bird

The purple-rumped sunbird (Leptocoma zeylonica) is a sunbird endemic to the Indian Subcontinent. Like other sunbirds, they are small in size, feeding mainly on nectar but sometimes take insects, particularly when feeding young. They can hover for short durations but usually perch to lap nectar from flowers. They build a hanging pouch nest made up of cobwebs, lichens and plant material. Males are contrastingly coloured but females are olive above and yellow to buff below. Males are easily distinguished from the purple sunbird by the light coloured underside while females can be told apart from males by their whitish throats.

== Description ==
Purple-rumped sunbirds are tiny, at less than 10 centimetres (4 in) long. They have medium-length thin down-curved bills and brush-tipped tubular tongues, both adaptations for nectar feeding. Purple-rumped sunbirds are sexually dimorphic. The males have a dark maroon upperside with a blue-green crown that glistens at some angles, bright green shoulder patch and violet/purple rump patch which is generally hidden under the wings. The underparts are whitish with dark throat, maroon breast band and purple/violet patch in the throat which is visible in some angles. The iris is generally reddish in color. In the Western Ghats, it can overlap in some areas with the crimson-backed sunbird but the male of that species has reddish upperparts, a broader breast band and generally darker eyes. The female has a white throat followed by yellowish breast. The upperside is olive or brownish. The uppertail coverts are black and a weak supercilium may be visible. The nominate subspecies from Sri Lanka has a more bluish violet throat whereas the Indian form flaviventris (two other proposed populations whistleri from Maddur in Karnataka and sola from Pondicherry are subsumed) has a more pinkish tinge.

Their call is ptsiee ptsit, ptsiee ptsswit or a sharp twittering tityou, titou, trrrtit, tityou....

== Distribution ==
The purple-rumped sunbird is a common resident breeder in southern India, Sri Lanka and Bangladesh. It is found in Gujarat to the west (possibly a recent expansion) and extending into Assam (Hailakandi) or Meghalaya in the east. Records from Myanmar are not certain. This species is found in a variety of habitats with trees, including scrub and cultivation and is usually absent from dense forest.

== Behaviour and ecology ==
They breed through the year and may have two broods, but mainly during the monsoons. The nest is made up of fine plant fibres, cobwebs and is studded on the exterior with lichens, bark pieces, flying seeds and other materials. The nest is constructed by the female alone although the male may fly alongside her. The nest is lined with soft fibres such as from the fuzz covering the seeds of Calotropis. The nest is placed on the end of branch and the entrance usually faces a bush. Nests may sometimes be built close to buildings or under open porches. The female stays in the nest at night a couple of day before laying the eggs. The clutch consists of two eggs which are generally oval, pale greenish and white with spots and streaks, becoming more dense at the broad end. Sometimes, eggs may be plain grey without markings as well. When collecting cobwebs they are often seen at windows of homes, a time when they also sometimes end up tapping the window, possibly at their own reflection. The eggs are usually laid in the morning. The eggs are incubated by both the male and female. The incubation period varies from 14 to 16 days. The chicks fledge in about 17 days and continue to be fed by the male for a few days. Helpers, females or possibly juveniles from the previous brood may sometimes assist the parents in feeding the young. Old nests are sometimes reused. Cases of nests being parasitised by the grey-bellied cuckoo are known. In one case the cuckoo was fed by an adult sunbird as well as an adult common tailorbird.

They pollinate the flowers of many plant species such as Bruguiera, Woodfordia, Hamelia and Sterculia. They tend to perch while foraging for nectar and do not hover as much as the syntopic Loten's sunbird. It has been noted that they maintain special scratching posts, where they get rid of pollen and nectar sticking to their head. When the flowers are too deep to probe, they sometimes pierce the base of the flower and rob the nectar, an action termed as "nectar theft" since the flower's primary purpose of attracting pollinators is foiled. They sometimes visit open crop fields and take honeydew exuded by leafhoppers.

Sunbird may indulge in dew-bathing, or bathing by sliding over drops of rain collected on large leaves.

Like most birds they harbour specific protozoa species in their blood. A species Haemoproteus raymundi has been described from a specimen from Goa but the identification and taxonomic placement of this malaria-like protozoan is disputed.

== Gallery ==
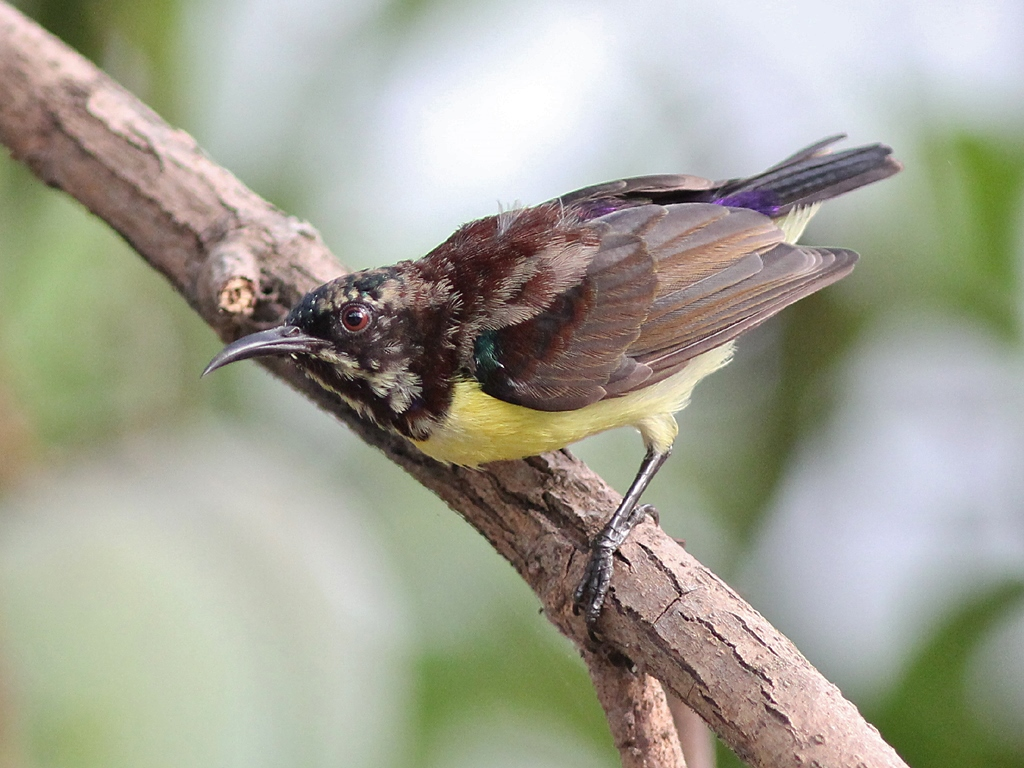
Male in moult

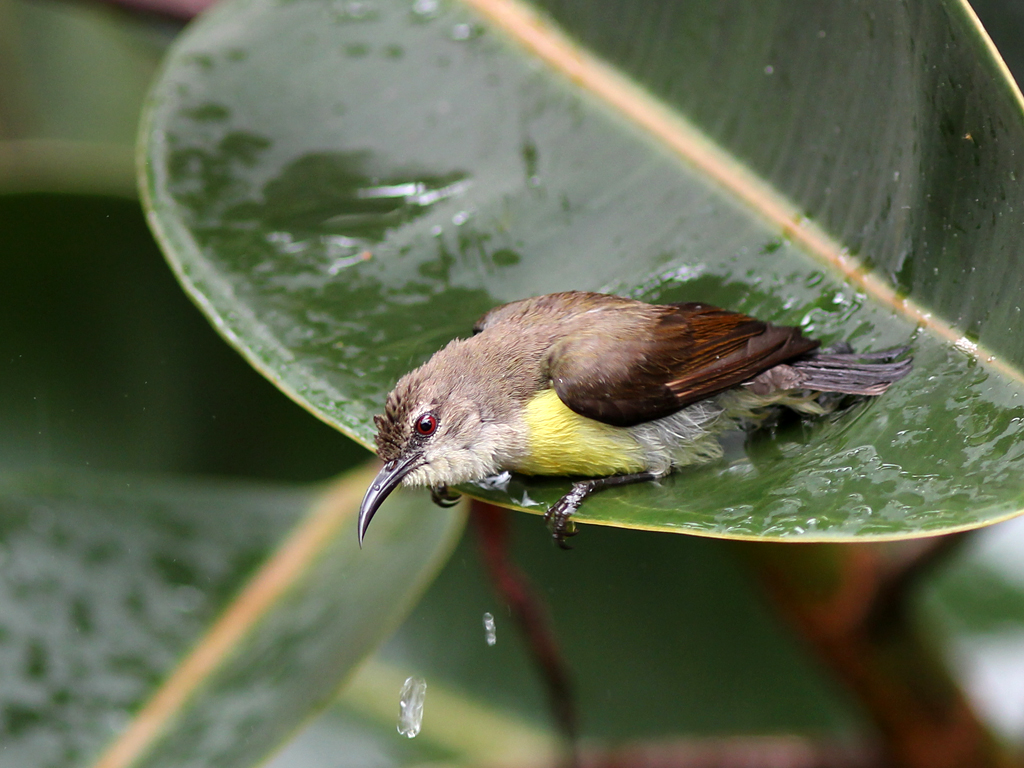
Female dew-bathing on a leaf of Rubber Fig

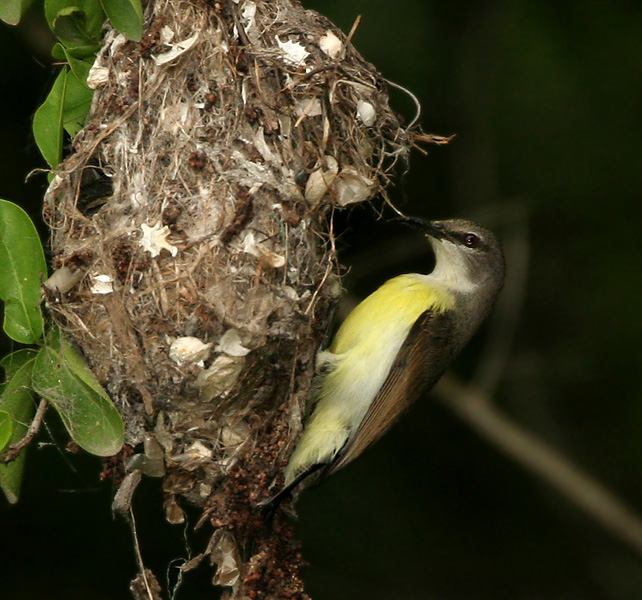
Female at nest. Note the faint supercilium.

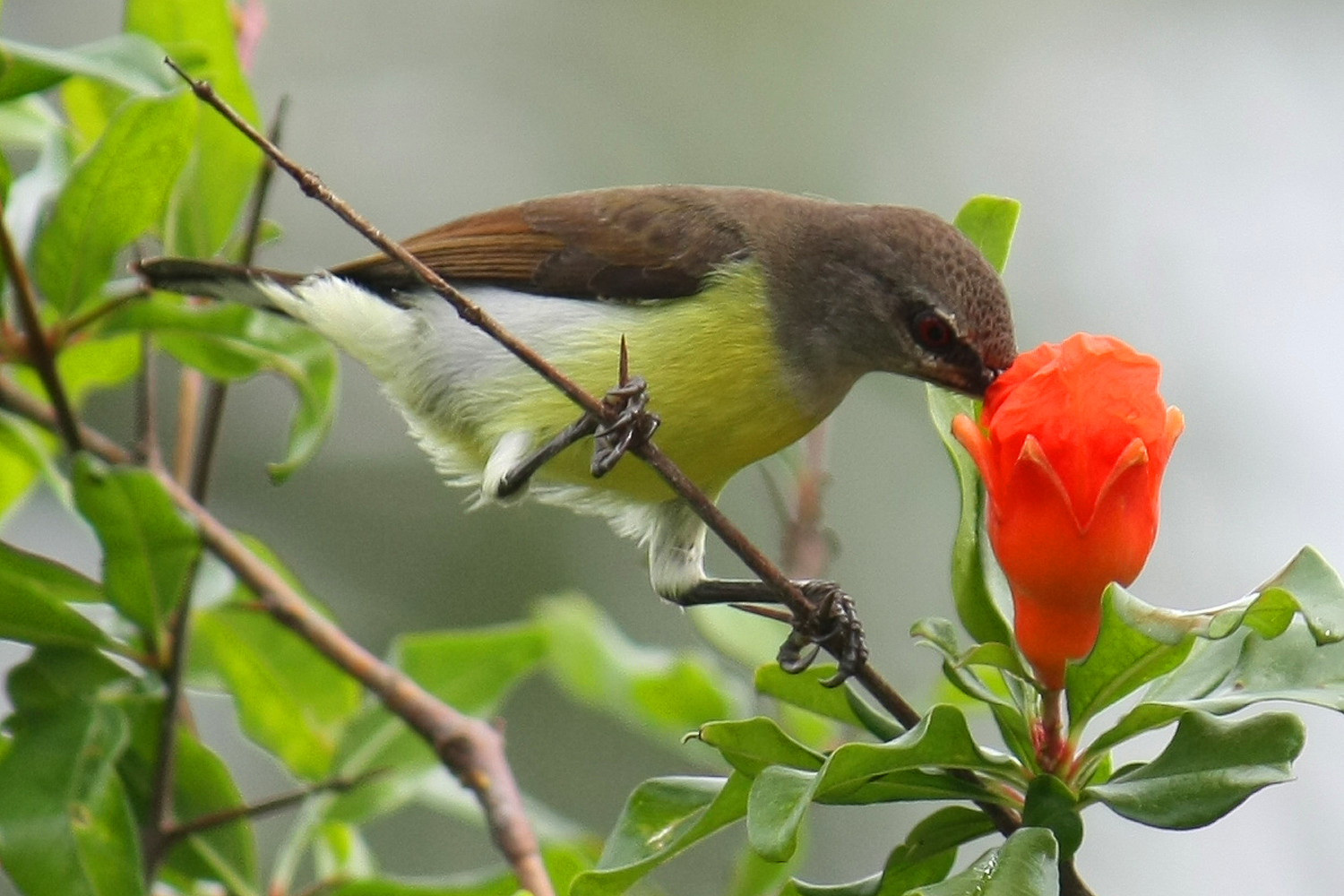
Pollen is brushed on the head when nectar-feeding.

== Other sources ==
- Johnson, J Mangalaraj (1970) Bird notes – Purplerumped Sunbird. Indian Forester 96:336–337.
- Lamba, BS (1978) Nidification of some common Indian birds 13. the Purple-rumped Sunbird, Nectarinia zeylonica Linnaeus. Indian J. For. 1(4):329–344.
- Prasad, A. (2007) Paternal aggressive behaviour towards offspring in Purple-rumped Sunbird Nectarinia zeylonica. J. Bombay Nat. Hist. Soc. 104(1):94
- Jardine, William (1864). Natural history of the Nectariniadae. Henry G. Bohn, London. p. 213.
- Pande, SA (1999). "Nest making and breeding of the Purplerumped Sunbirds (Abstract)". Newsletter for Birdwatchers. 38 (6): 102–103.
- Wesley, HD (1991). "Parental care in the purplerumped sunbird". Newsletter for Birdwatchers. 31 (3&4): 2–3.
- Navarro, S.J.A. (1974). "The adaptive behaviour of the Purplerumped Sunbird". Newsletter for Birdwatchers. 14 (11): 1–3.
- Nair, N.R. (1963). "Purplerumped Sunbird – nesting season". Newsletter for Birdwatchers. 3 (10): 10–11.
- Hill, LA (1966). "Purplerumped Sunbird nesting". Newsletter for Birdwatchers. 6 (10): 5–6.
- Neelakantan, KK (1975). "The Purplerumped Sunbird". Newsletter for Birdwatchers. 15 (1): 8.
