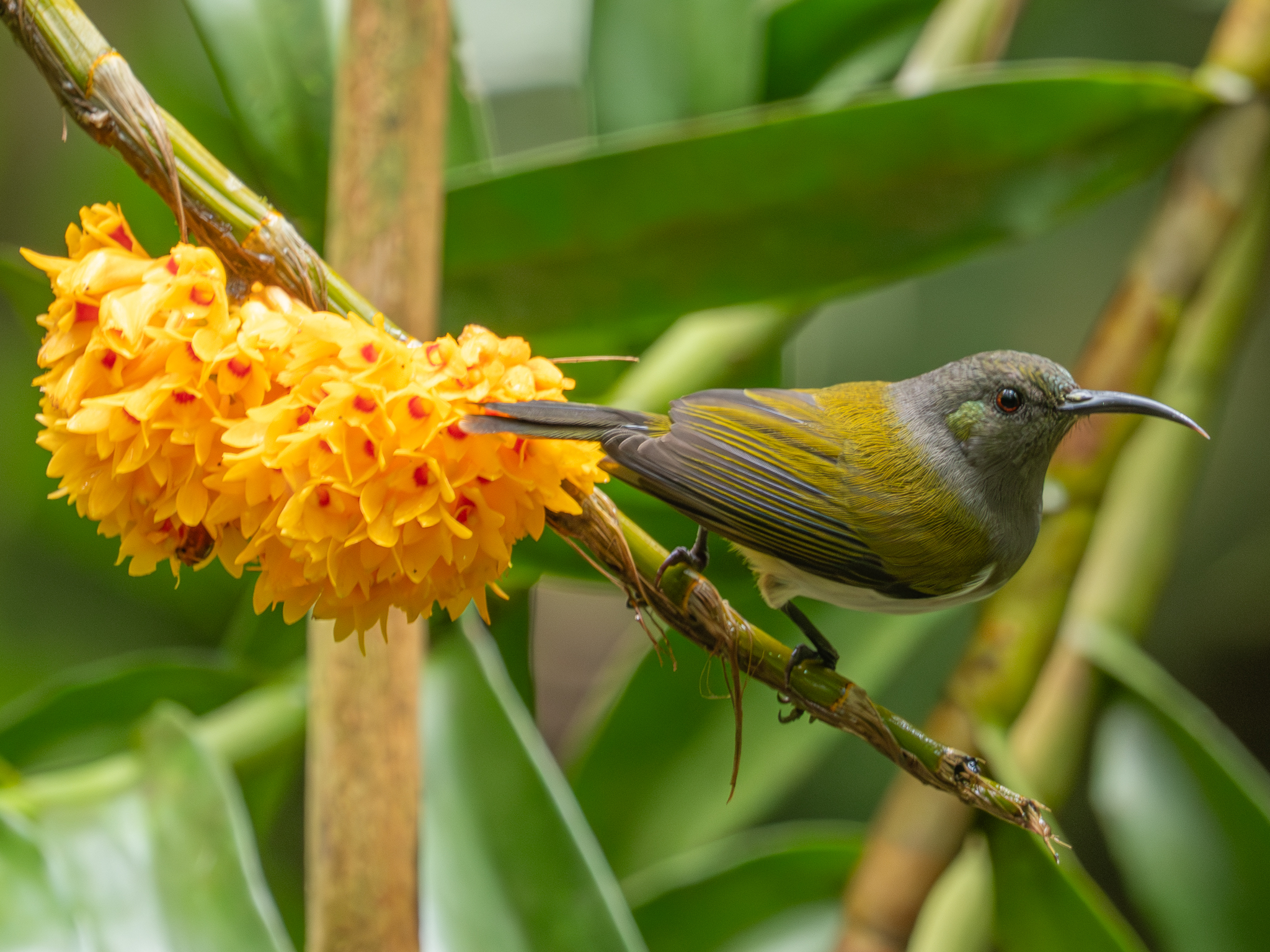
- ssp. primigenia

Conservation status
- Least Concern (IUCN 3.1)

Scientific classification
- Kingdom: Animalia
- Phylum: Chordata
- Class: Aves
- Order: Passeriformes
- Family: Nectariniidae
- Genus: Aethopyga
- Species: A. primigenia

Binomial name
- Aethopyga primigenia (Hachisuka, 1941)

Synonyms
- Aethopyga primigenius (lapsus)

= Grey-hooded sunbird =

Species of bird

The grey-hooded sunbird (Aethopyga primigenia) is a species of bird in the family Nectariniidae. It is endemic to the Philippines found only in the moist montane forests of Mindanao. It is one of the three montane Mindanao endemic sunbirds along with the Lina's sunbird and the Apo sunbird.

== Description and taxonomy ==
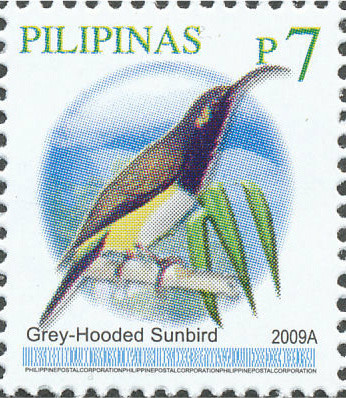
A Philippine stamp in 2009 depicting the Grey-hooded Sunbird

=== Subspecies ===
Two subspecies are recognized:

- Aethopyga primigenia primigenia: Found in West, Central and Southern Mindanao; plainer breast
- Aethopyga primigenia diuatae: Found in Northeast Mindanao; grayer overall appearance, white streak with yellow spot on breast

== Ecology and behavior ==
It is often seen around banana flowers. Presumed to feed on nectar and occasionally insects.

Birds in breeding condition with enlarged gonads collected from November to February. Otherwise, no published information on this species' breeding habits.

== Habitat and Conservation status ==
It occurs in tropical moist montane forest and forest edges above altitudes of 1,000 m, but may reach limits of 1,700 m.

IUCN has assessed this bird as a least-concern species in 2020, with it formerly being near threatened. Despite its limited range it is said to be locally common, possibly occurring in densities of close to 50 birds per km^{2}. The population is estimated at around 20,000 - 49,999 mature individuals. As it occurs in rugged and inaccessible mountains, this has allowed a large portion of its habitat to remain intact. However, there it is still affected by habitat loss through deforestation, mining, land conversion and slash-and-burn - though not to the same extent as in lowland forests.

Several proposals have been made to strengthen conservation action, including granting protection to areas of suitable habitat and regularly monitoring important areas such as Mt. Hamiguitan.

== Gallery ==
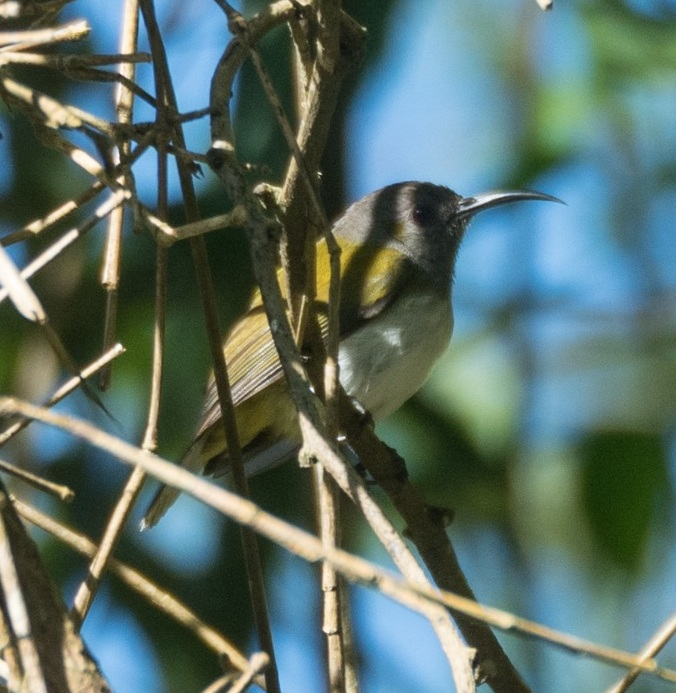

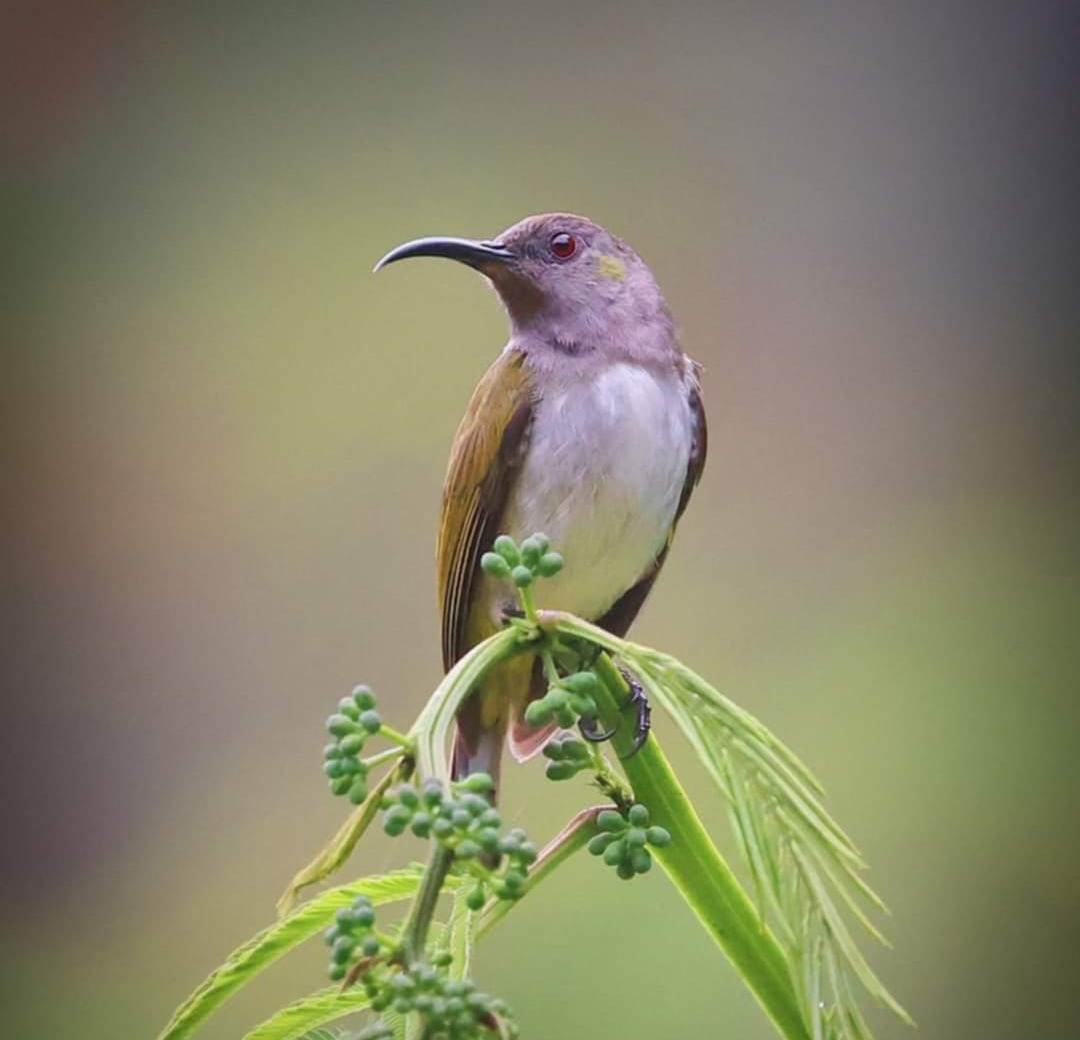

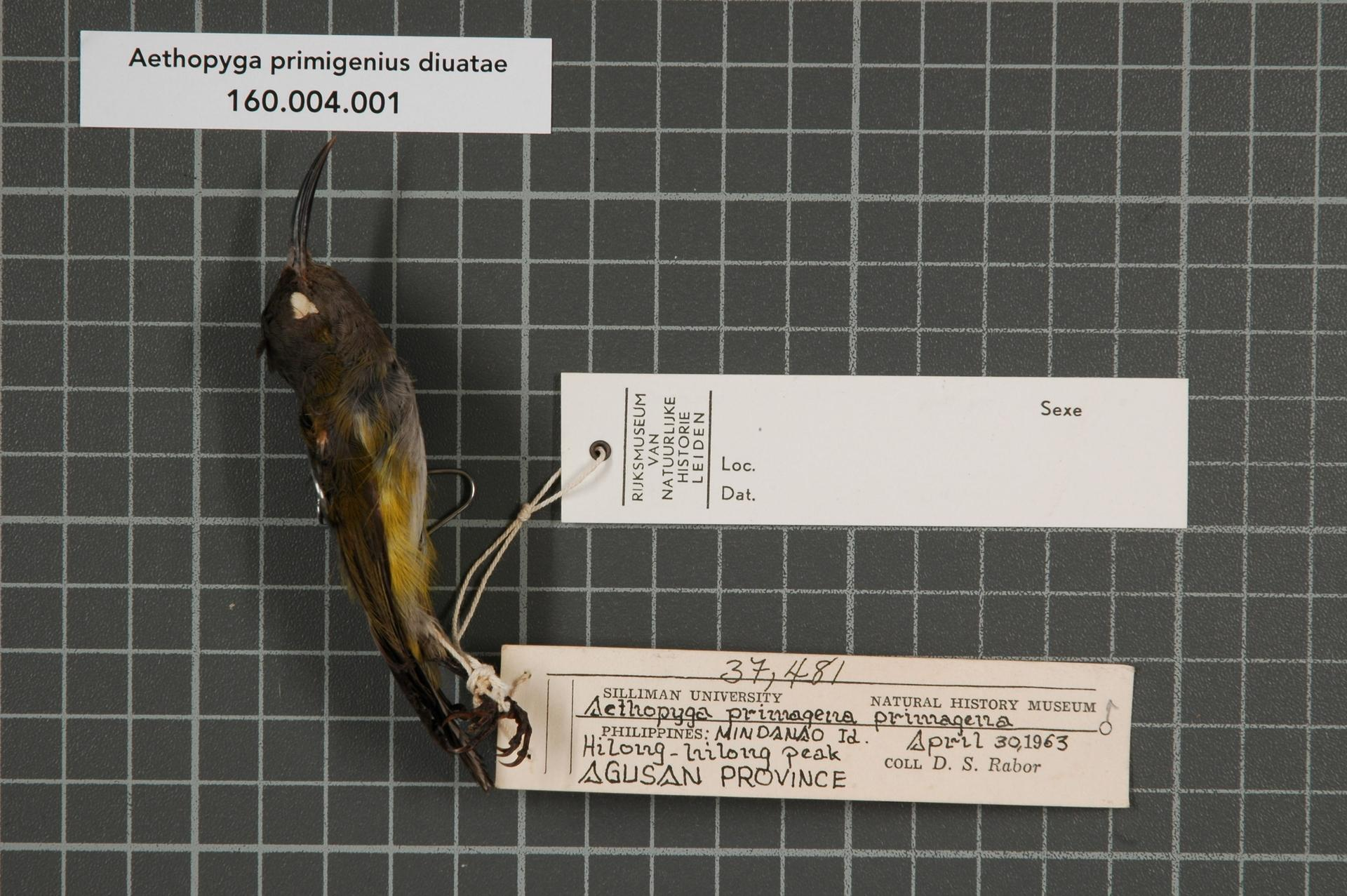
