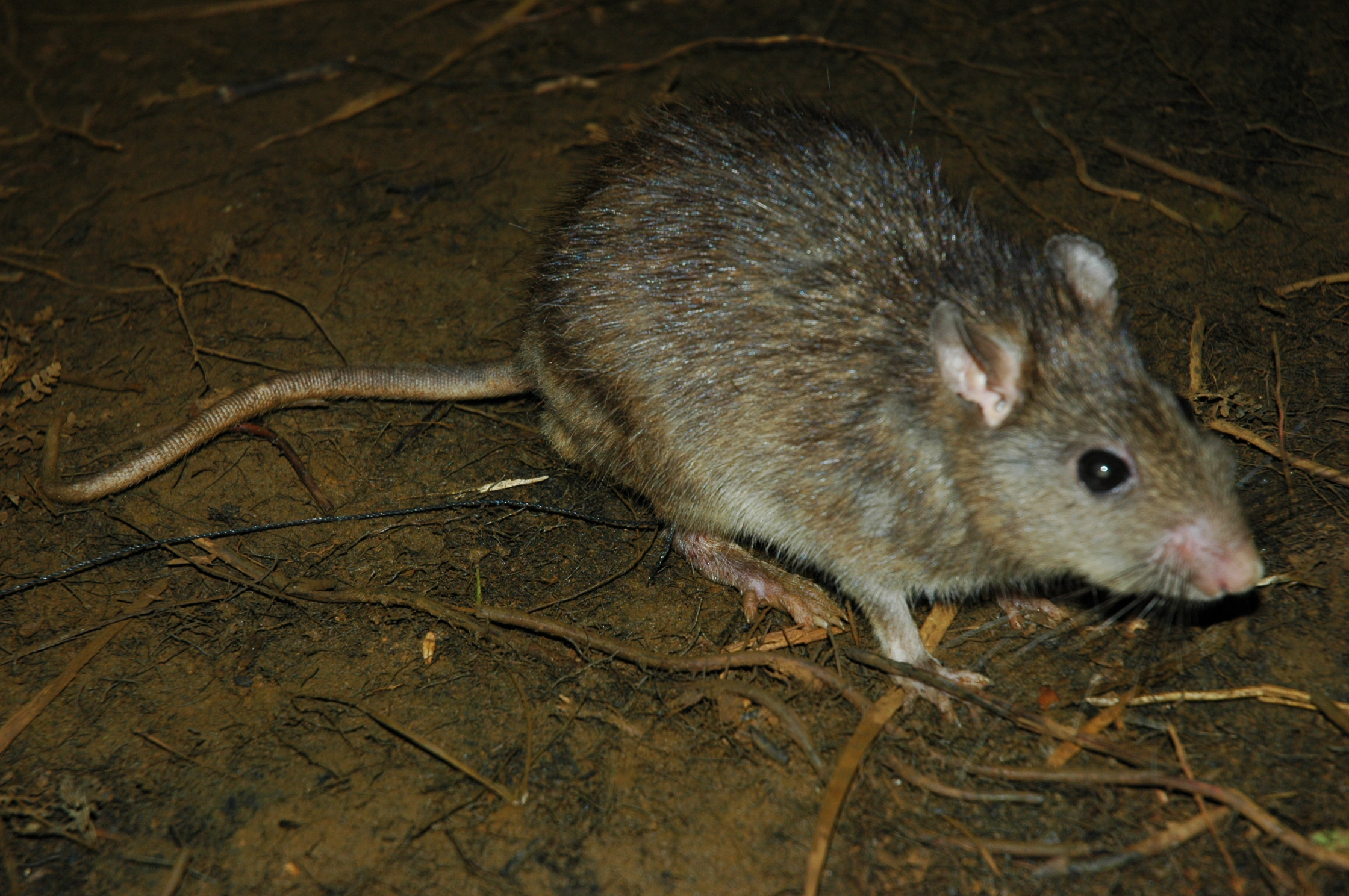

Conservation status
- Least Concern (IUCN 3.1)

Scientific classification
- Kingdom: Animalia
- Phylum: Chordata
- Class: Mammalia
- Infraclass: Placentalia
- Order: Rodentia
- Family: Muridae
- Genus: Bullimus
- Species: B. bagobus

Binomial name
- Bullimus bagobus Mearns, 1905
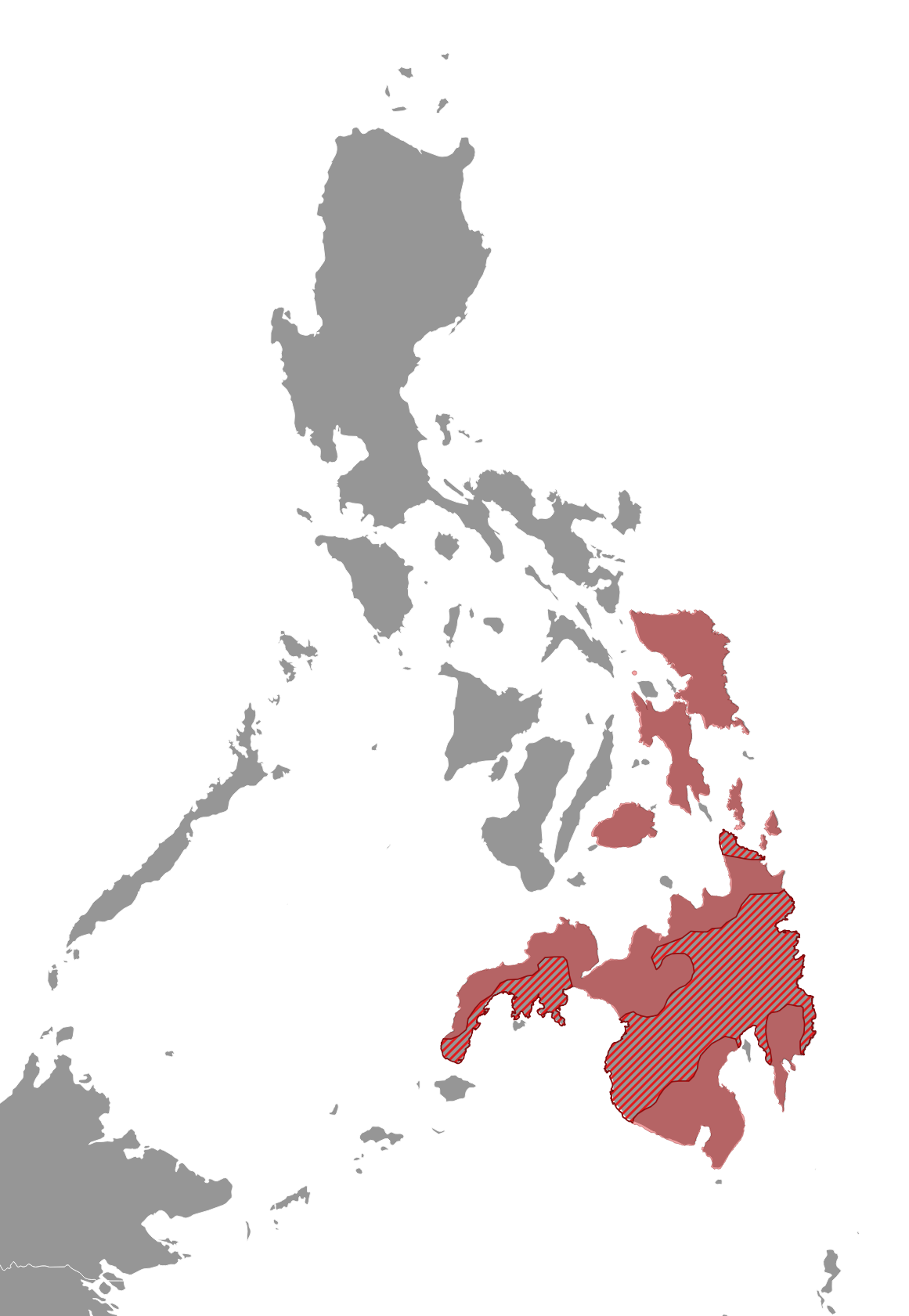

= Bagobo rat =

Species of rodent

The Bagobo rat (Bullimus bagobus) is one of four species of rodent in the genus Bullimus in the Muridae family.

It is locally known as "Kawili"

It is found in the Samar, Leyte, Mindanao and Basilan in the Philippines.
