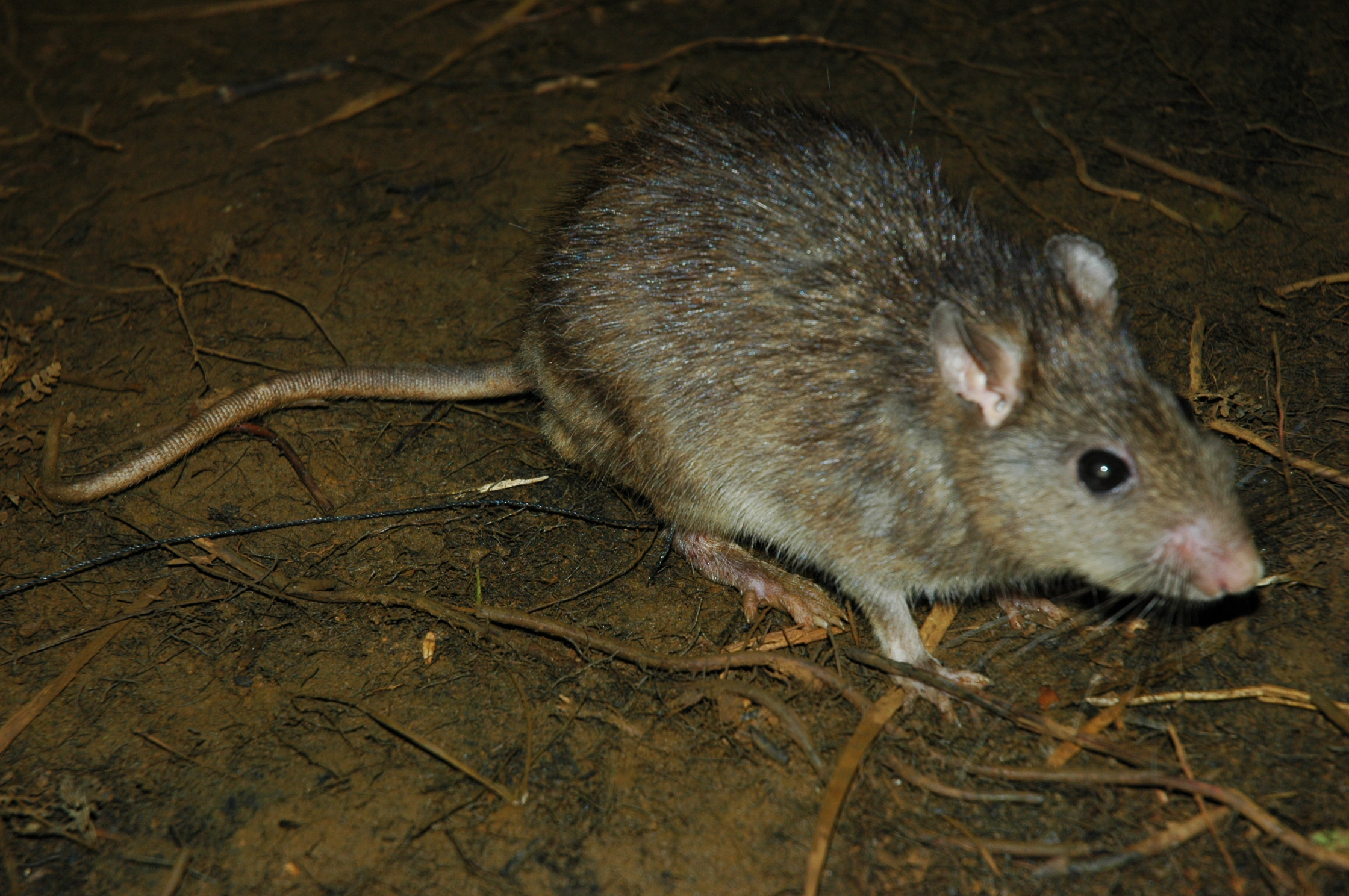
- Bagobo rat (Bullimus bagobus)

Scientific classification
- Domain: Eukaryota
- Kingdom: Animalia
- Phylum: Chordata
- Class: Mammalia
- Order: Rodentia
- Family: Muridae
- Subfamily: Murinae
- Tribe: Rattini
- Genus: Bullimus; Mearns, 1905

Type species
- Bullimus bagobus

Species
- Bullimus bagobus Bullimus carletoni Bullimus gamay Bullimus luzonicus

= Bullimus =

Genus of rodents

Bullimus is an endemic genus of rodent from the Philippines, as first catalogued by Mearns, in 1905.

== Species ==
Genus Bullimus

- Bagobo rat, Bullimus bagobus, Mindanao
- Carleton's forest rat, Bullimus carletoni, Luzon - Described in 2021.
- Camiguin forest rat, Bullimus gamay, Camiguin
- Large Luzon forest rat, Bullimus luzonicus, Luzon
