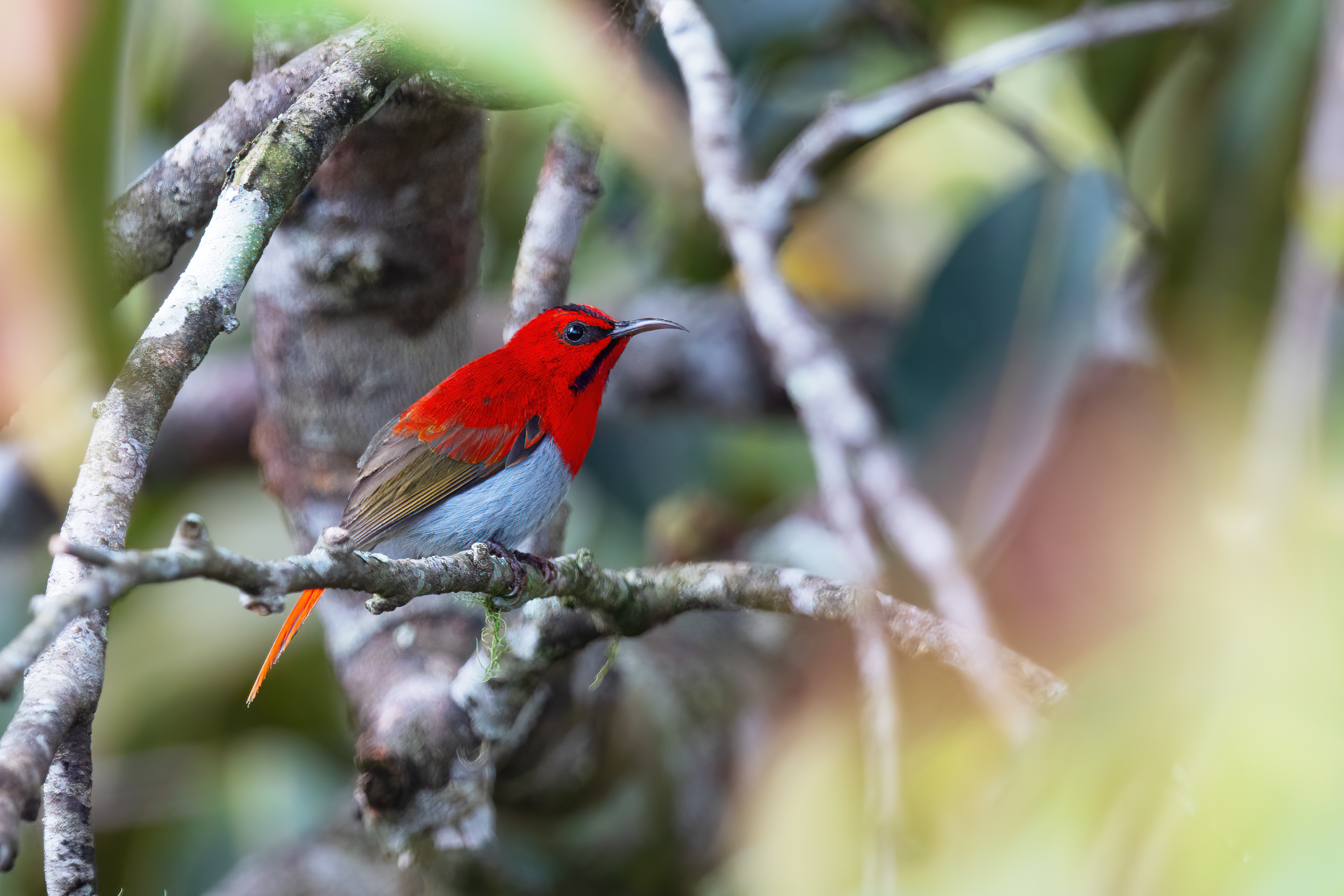

Conservation status
- Least Concern (IUCN 3.1)

Scientific classification
- Kingdom: Animalia
- Phylum: Chordata
- Class: Aves
- Order: Passeriformes
- Family: Nectariniidae
- Genus: Aethopyga
- Species: A. temminckii

Binomial name
- Aethopyga temminckii (Müller, 1843)

= Temminck's sunbird =

Species of bird

Temminck's sunbird (Aethopyga temminckii) is a species of sunbird. It is found in up to 1800 m altitude in Borneo, Sumatra, West Malaysia, and south west Thailand in tropical moist montane forests.

This bird's common name and Latin binomial commemorate the Dutch aristocrat and zoologist Coenraad Jacob Temminck.

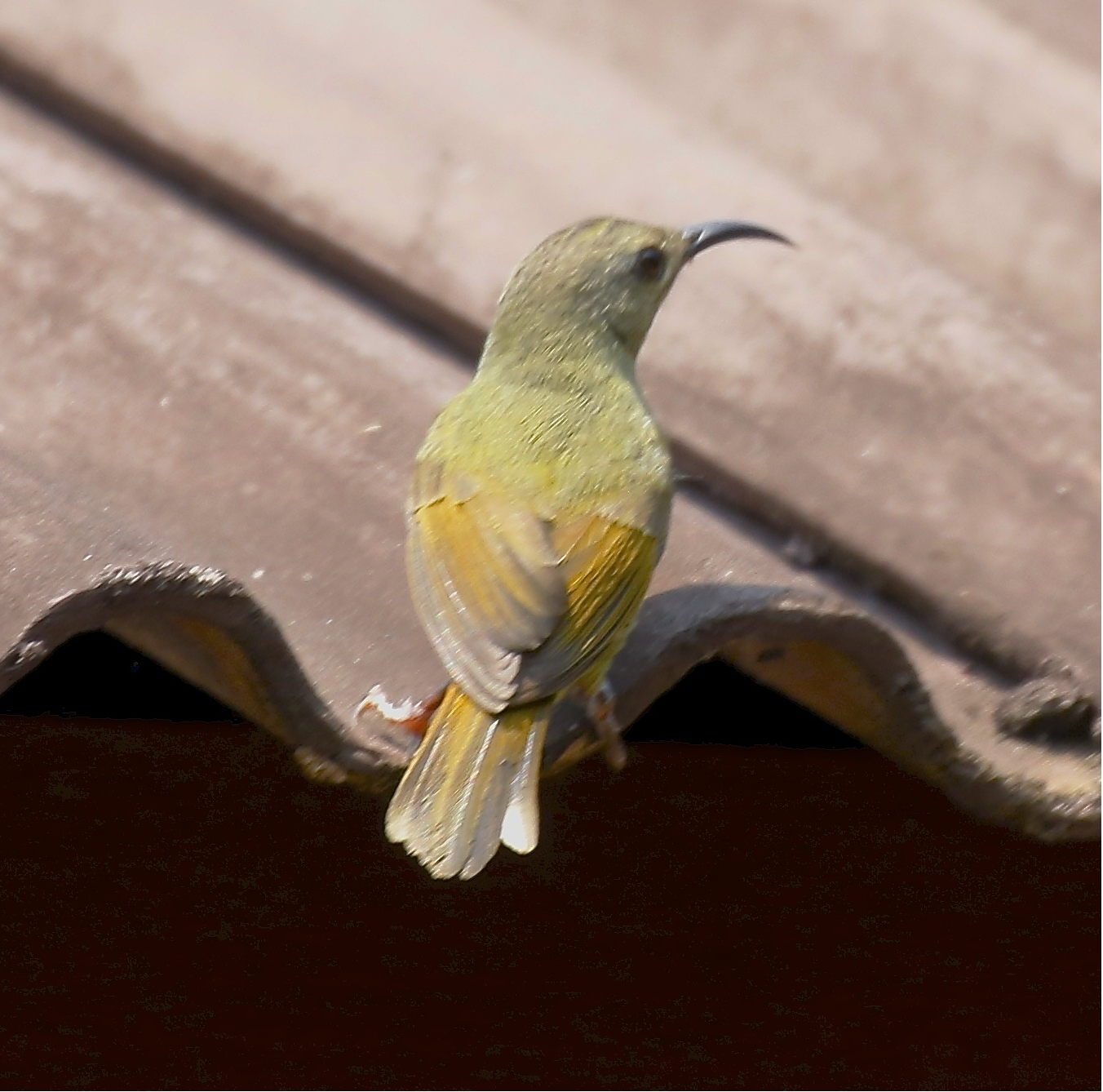
female - Doi Ang Khang Mountain - Thailand.

It has been considered conspecific with Javan sunbird, Aethopyga mystacalis.

The Temminck's sunbird is 10 cm (female) -12.5 cm (male) long. The longer-tailed male is mostly scarlet, except for a greyish belly, yellow and purple bands between the back and tail, and four purple bands on the head emanating from the beak. The female is drab olive, except for rufous fringes to the wing and tail feathers.
