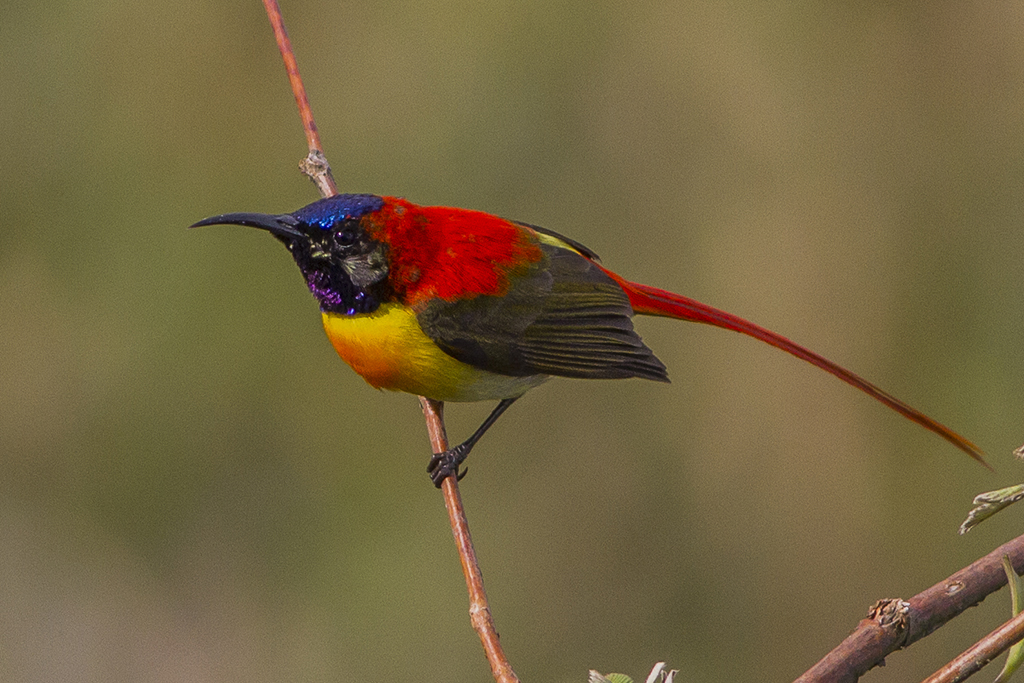
- Male (♂) of the subspecies ignicauda from Sikkim, India
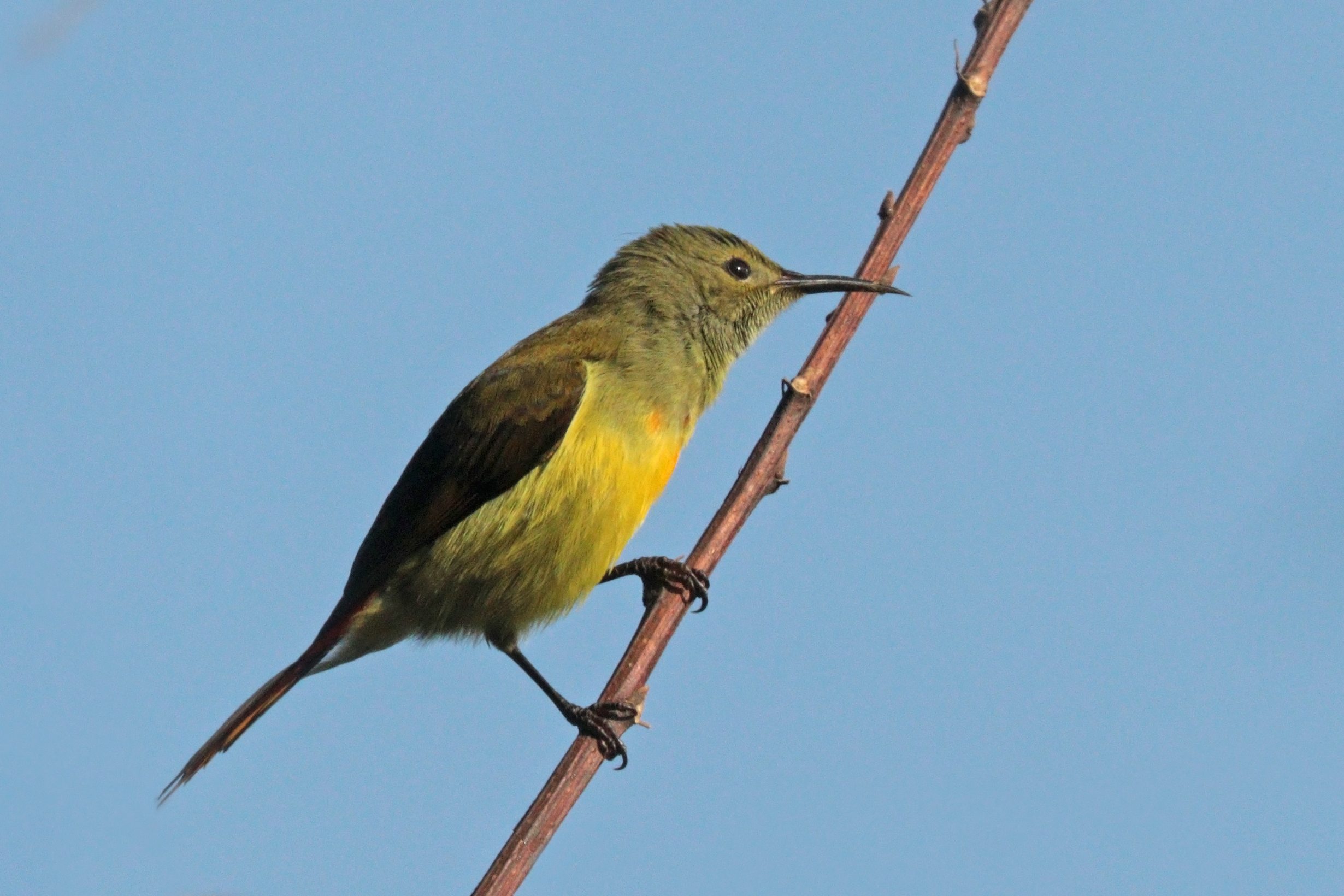
- Female, Mount Phulchowki, Nepal

Conservation status
- Least Concern (IUCN 3.1)

Scientific classification
- Kingdom: Animalia
- Phylum: Chordata
- Class: Aves
- Order: Passeriformes
- Family: Nectariniidae
- Genus: Aethopyga
- Species: A. ignicauda

Binomial name
- Aethopyga ignicauda (Hodgson, 1836)

= Fire-tailed sunbird =

Species of bird

The fire-tailed sunbird (Aethopyga ignicauda) is a species of sunbird in the family Nectariniidae.

It is found in the northern parts of the Indian subcontinent, primarily in the Himalayas, and also in some adjoining regions in Southeast Asia. The species occurs in Bangladesh, Bhutan, India, Myanmar, Nepal, Thailand and Tibet.

Its natural habitats are temperate forests and subtropical or tropical moist montane forests. Breeding males have a scarlet nape and mantle, and a yellow-orange breast and an olive-green belly. They develop a long scarlet tail, and including the tail are about 15 cm long; females are about two-thirds that length. Females have a grey-olive head and throat, and a yellow belly. Females are differentiated from the similar female green-tailed sunbird by a straighter bill, squarer tail (lacking white tips and with trace of brownish orange on the sides) and mor noticeable olive-yellow on the rump. Eclipse males are similar to females but have brighter yellow bellies, scarlet uppertail coverts, and scarlet tail sides. They live in conifer forests at altitudes up to 4,000 meters, descending into the valleys during the cold season, wintering in broadleaved forests. They eat insects, and also nectar. They breed in rhododendron shrub. Both parents take part in feeding the young.

== Gallery ==
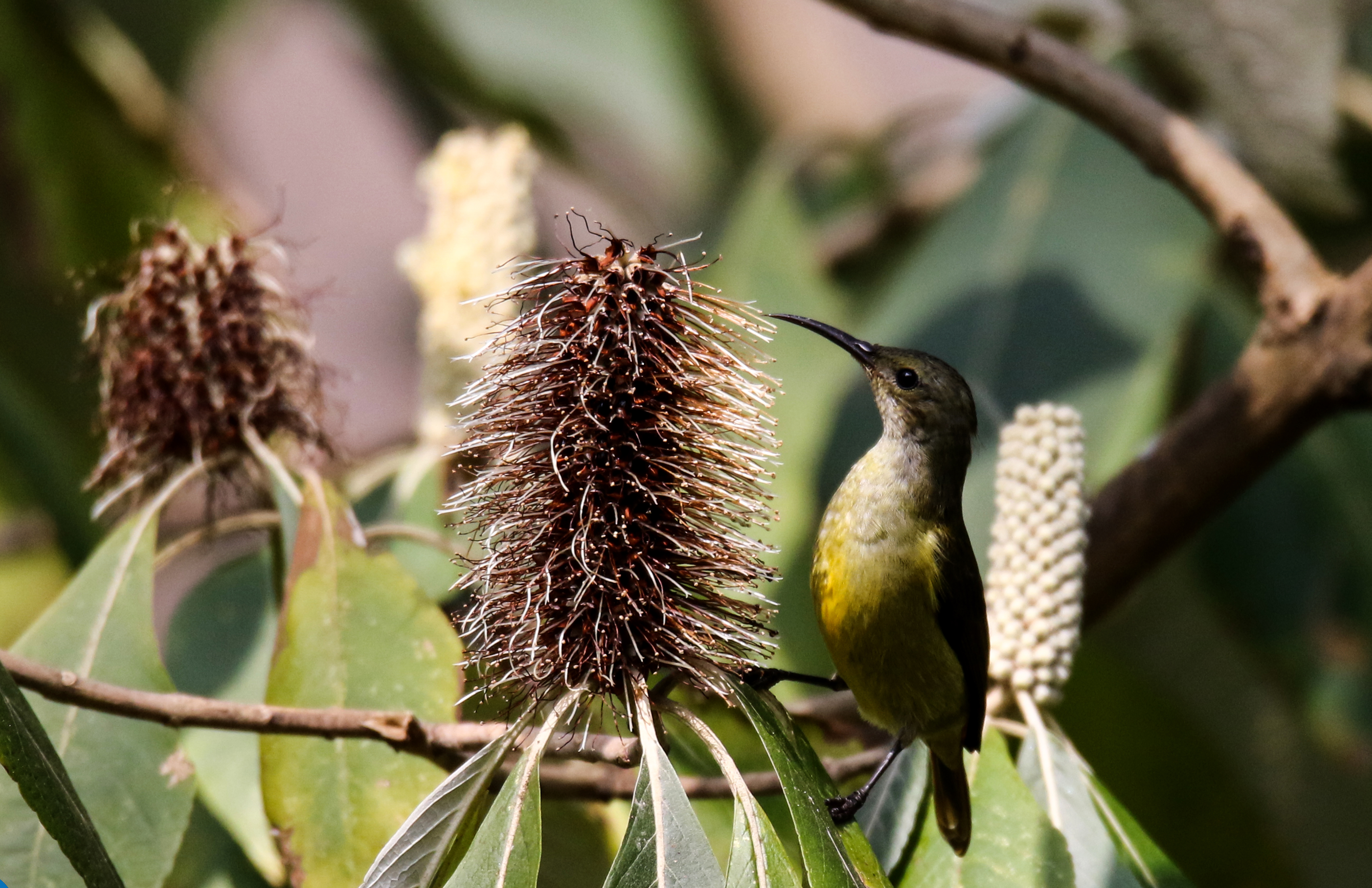
Female fire-tailed sunbird, Nepal

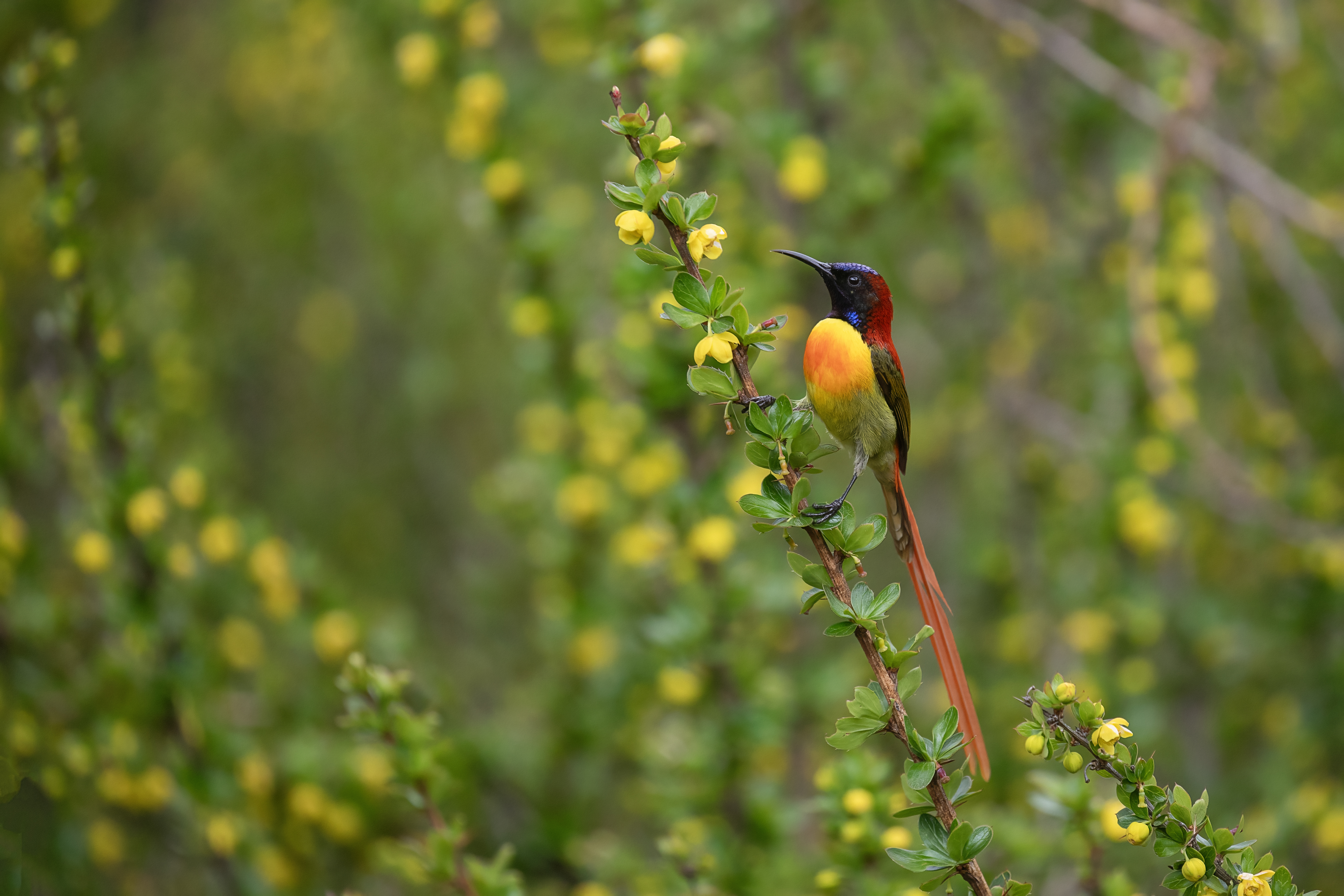
A fire-tailed sunbird rests lightly on a flowering branch inside Sagarmatha National Park, Nepal.
