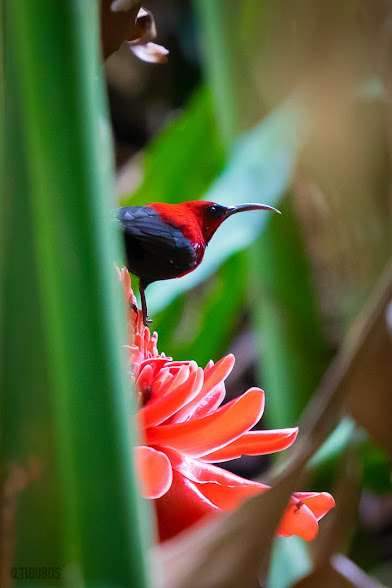
- Male
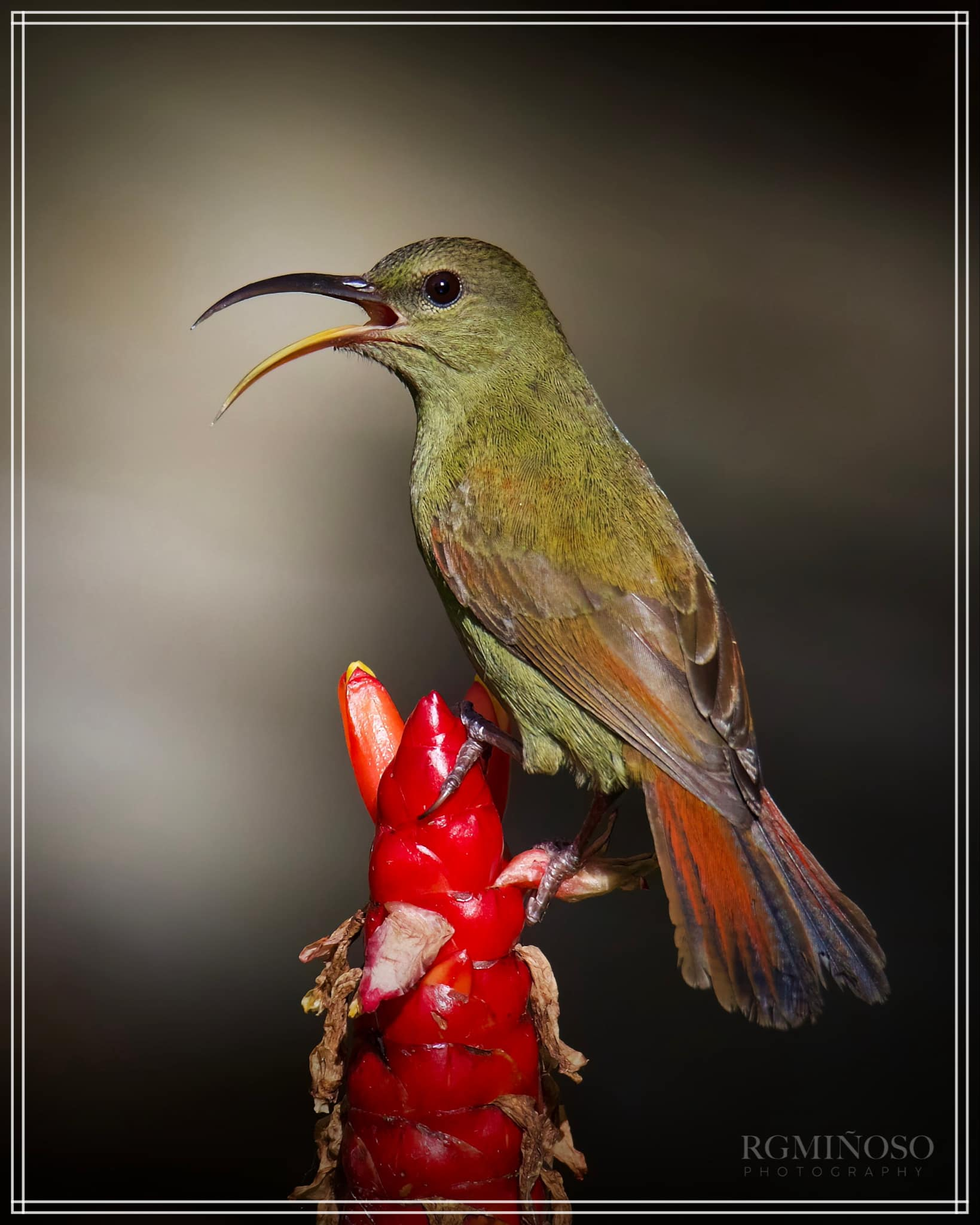
- Female

Conservation status
- Least Concern (IUCN 3.1)

Scientific classification
- Kingdom: Animalia
- Phylum: Chordata
- Class: Aves
- Order: Passeriformes
- Family: Nectariniidae
- Genus: Aethopyga
- Species: A. magnifica

Binomial name
- Aethopyga magnifica Sharpe, 1876

= Magnificent sunbird =

Species of bird

The magnificent sunbird (Aethopyga magnifica) is a striking species of bird in the sunbird family. It is endemic to the Philippines found in the Visayan islands of Negros Island, Panay, Cebu, Tablas Island and Romblon. It was considered a subspecies of the crimson sunbird.

== Description and taxonomy ==
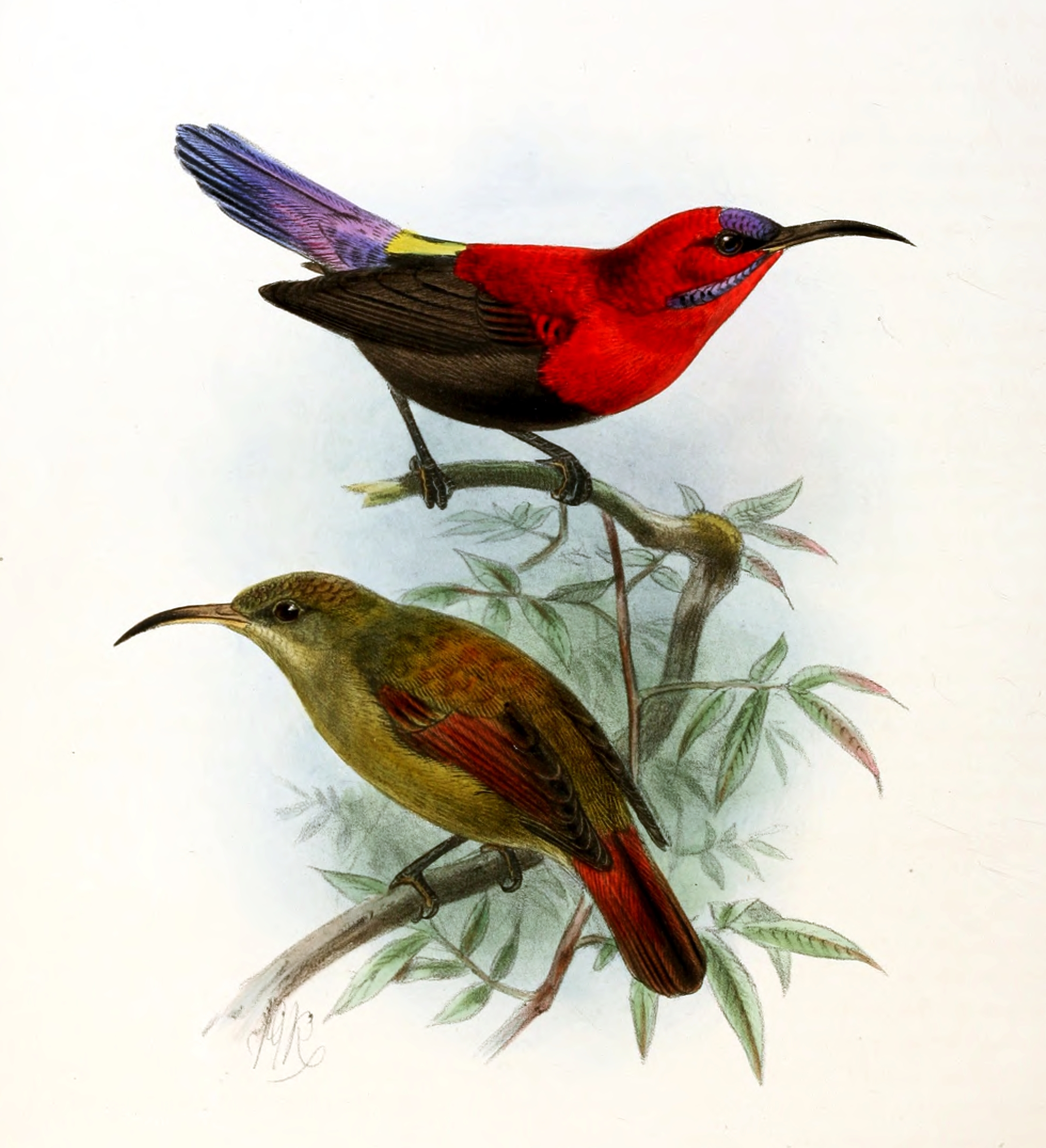
An illustration of a male (top) and female (bottom) by J. G. Keulemans (1880)

This species was once conspecific with the Crimson sunbird but differs with its larger size. Males of the Magnificent sunbird differ with its black belly and purplish tails while females are much darker.

== Ecology and behavior ==
Feed largely on nectar, although they will also take insects, especially when feeding young. Flight is fast and direct on their short wings. Most species can take nectar by hovering like a hummingbird, but usually perch to feed most of the time.

Breeds from February to June. Nest is bag shaped with roofed entrance made of roots, grass, plant fibers woven with spider webs. This nest is typically low and well concealed and close to large tree trunks. Clutch size is typically 2 to 3 reddish brown eggs with brownish red spotting and scribbles.

== Habitat and conservation status ==
It is found in fruiting and flowering trees in primary, secondary and cultivated areas up to 1000 masl.

IUCN has assessed this bird as least concern with the population trend being assessed as stable. This is due to the species being able to tolerate degraded forest and cultivated areas unlike other forest specialists.
