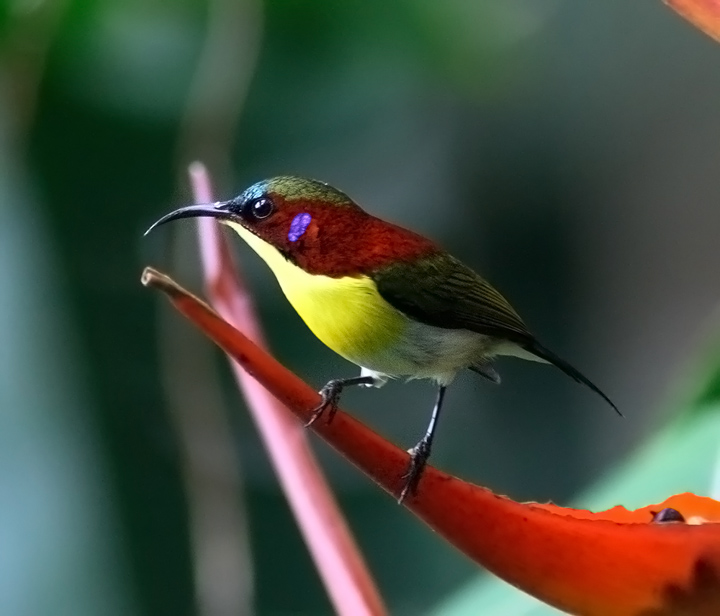
- Male
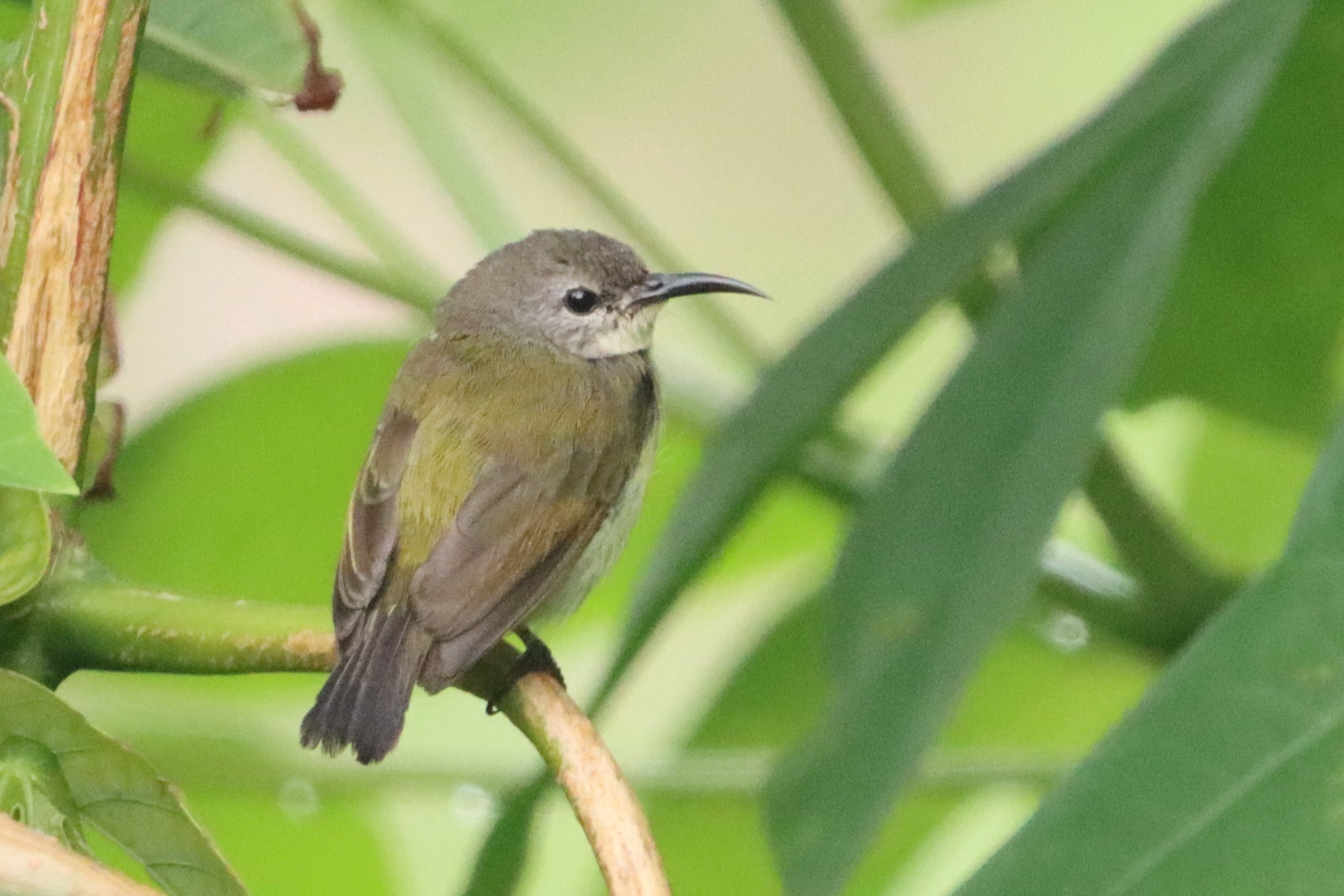
- Female

Conservation status
- Least Concern (IUCN 3.1)

Scientific classification
- Kingdom: Animalia
- Phylum: Chordata
- Class: Aves
- Order: Passeriformes
- Family: Nectariniidae
- Genus: Aethopyga
- Species: A. bella

Binomial name
- Aethopyga bella Tweeddale, 1877

= Handsome sunbird =

Species of bird

The handsome sunbird (Aethopyga bella) is a species of bird in the family Nectariniidae. It is endemic to the Philippines.

Its natural habitats are tropical moist lowland forests and tropical moist montane forests.It has a high pitched voice and it sounds like "chik".

== Description and taxonomy ==
It was formerly conspecific with the Lovely sunbird but is differentiated by its plain yellow breast versus the Lovely sunbirds red streaking.

=== Subspecies ===
Six subspecies are recognised:

- A. b. flavipectus Ogilvie-Grant, WR, 1894 – northern Philippines (northern Luzon)
- A. b. minuta Bourns, FS & Worcester, DC, 1894 – northern Philippines (central Luzon, Mindoro, Polillo, and Marinduque)
- A. b. rubrinota McGregor, RC, 1905 – northern Philippines (Lubang)
- A. b. bella Tweeddale, A, 1877 – east-central and southern Philippines (Samar, Leyte, Dinagat Islands, Siargao, and Mindanao)
- A. b. bonita Bourns, FS & Worcester, DC, 1894 – west-central Philippines (Ticao, Masbate, Panay, Negros and Cebu)
- A. b. arolasi Bourns, FS & Worcester, DC, 1894 – southern Philippines (Sulu Archipelago)

== Ecology and behavior ==
Not much is known about its diet but it is presumed to have the typical flowerpecker diet of small fruits, insects, nectar especially from mistletoes. Typically seen singly, pairs, small groups and joins mixed species flocks. Breeding has been recorded on January, June, July and September. Nests were found with 3 eggs but otherwise breeding is unstudied.

== Habitat and conservation status ==
Its natural habitats are tropical moist lowland forest, montane forest, second growth and plantations up to 2,000 meters above sea level.

The IUCN has classified the species as Least Concern as it has a large range and it is common throughout with the population believed to be stable. However, deforestation in the Philippines continues throughout the country due to slash and burn farming, mining, illegal logging and habitat conversion.

It is found in multiple protected areas such as Bataan National Park, Mount Banahaw, Mount Kitanglad. Mount Apo, Pasonanca Natural Park and Northern Sierra Madre Natural Park but like all areas in the Philippines, protection is lax and deforestation continues despite this protection on paper.
