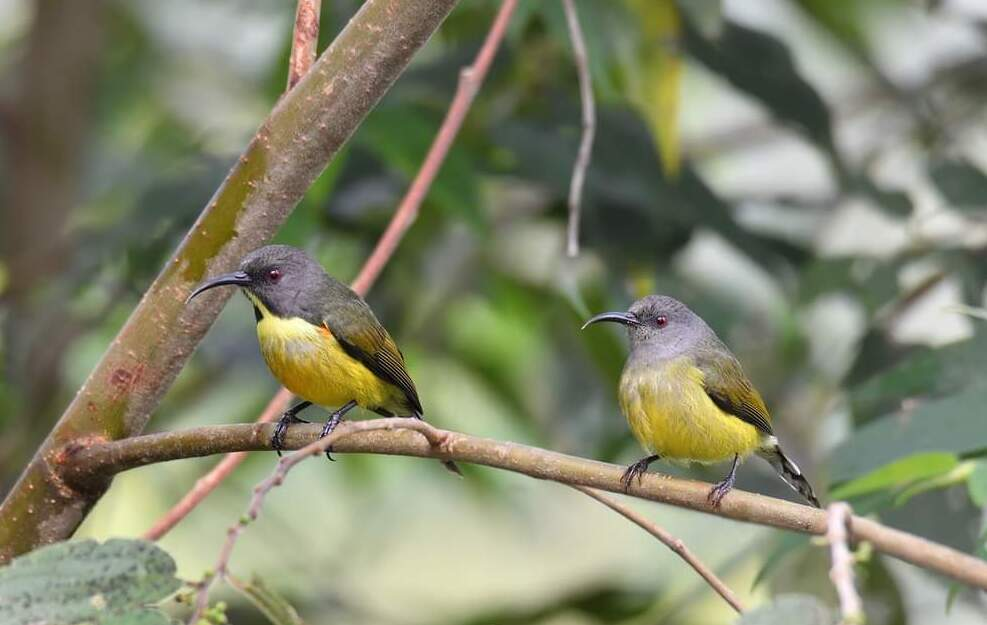
- Male
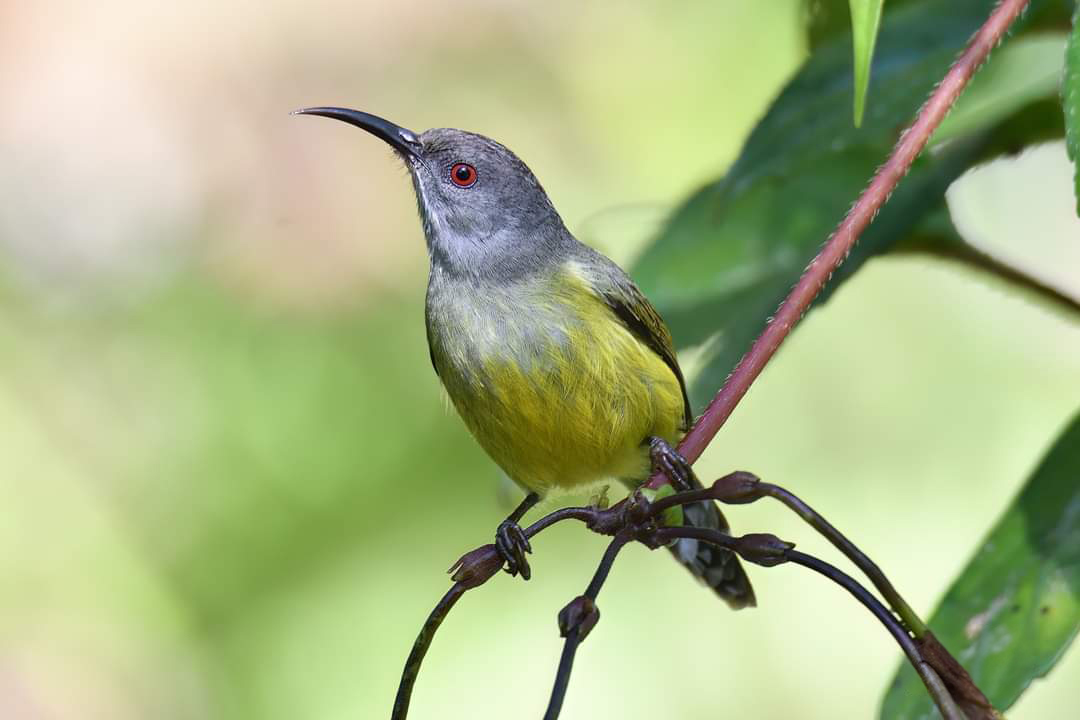
- Female

Scientific classification
- Kingdom: Animalia
- Phylum: Chordata
- Class: Aves
- Order: Passeriformes
- Family: Nectariniidae
- Genus: Aethopyga
- Species: A. tibolii

Binomial name
- Aethopyga tibolii Kennedy, Gonzales & Miranda, 1997

= Tboli sunbird =

Species of bird

The Tboli sunbird (Aethopyga tibolii) is a species of bird in the sunbird family Nectariniidae. It is endemic to the Philippines found only in the mountains of south Mindanao. Its natural habitat is tropical moist montane forest starting from 800 meters above sea level. It was formerly considered to be a subspecies of the Apo sunbird.

== Taxonomy ==
The Tboli sunbird was formally described in 1997 by Robert Kennedy and collaborators based on a specimen collected in mossy forest at an elevation of 1,321 m (4,334 ft), near Mount Busa in the south of the island of Mindanao in the Philippines. They considered it to be a subspecies of the Apo sunbird and coined the trinomial name Aethopyga boltoni tibolii where the epithet tiboli is named after the Tboli people who inhabit southern Mindanao. The Tboli sunbird is now treated as a separate species based on the differences in plumage and vocalizations as well as the divergence of the mitochondrial DNA.

== Ecology and behavior ==
This species is presumed to feed primarily on nectar but will also supplement its diet with insects especially when it is nesting. This species is found singly, in pairs and forms mixed species flocks with other forest birds.

Not much information about this species' ecology has been published aside the paper released when it was described as a subspecies in 1997. The Apo sunbird is better studied and it is highly likely to have the same breeding habits. Apo sunbirds have been recorded breeding in January to July. Its nest was described as built of moss, spider eggs and insect cases.

== Habitat and conservation status ==
The Apo sunbird is a bird local to the island of Mindanao in the Philippines. It can be found in mountainous areas in the southern parts of the island on Mount Matutum and Mount Busa in the provinces of South Cotabato and Sarangani Its natural habitat is in montane rainforest above 800 meters above sea leve which is significantly lower than the boltoni and malindangensis Apo sunbirds which are found above 1,500 meters above sea level.

The Tboli sunbird has not yet been recognized as its own species by the International Union for Conservation of Nature. The Apo sunbird is listed as least concern but was formerly near threatened. Despite its limited range, it is said to be locally common.

As it occurs in rugged and inaccessible mountains, this has allowed a large portion of its habitat to remain intact. However, there it is still affected by habitat loss through deforestation, mining, land conversion and slash-and-burn - just not to the same extent as lowland forest. It is found in the protected areas of Lake Holon and Mount Matutum but actual protection from deforestation is still lax.
