= Large Luzon forest rat =

Large Luzon Forest Rat

Conservation status
- Least Concern (IUCN 3.1)

Scientific classification
- Kingdom: Animalia
- Phylum: Chordata
- Class: Mammalia
- Order: Rodentia
- Family: Muridae
- Genus: Bullimus
- Species: B. luzonicus

Binomial name
- Bullimus luzonicus (Thomas, 1895)
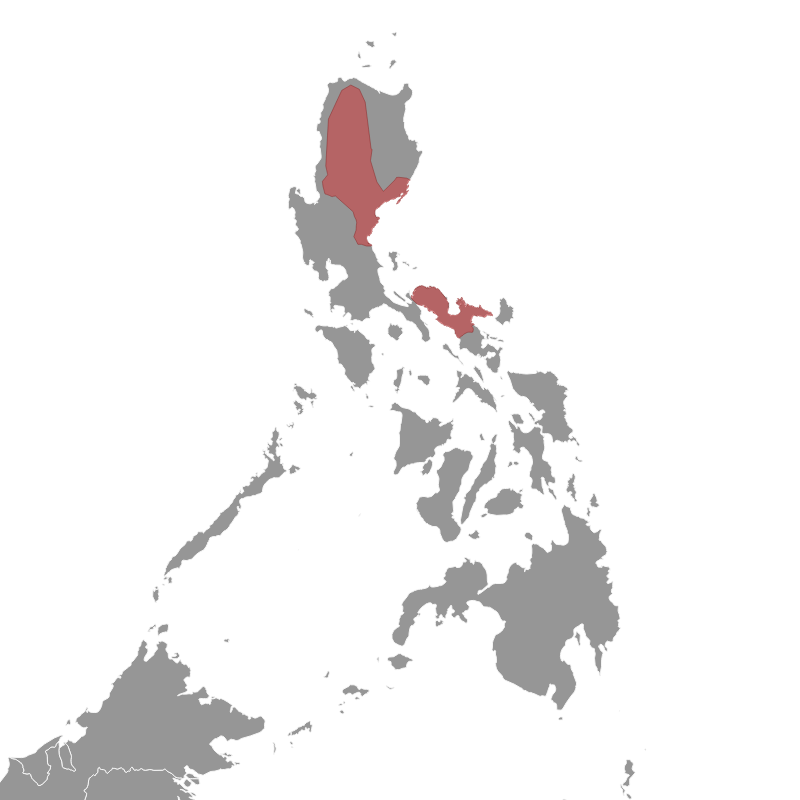

Species of rodent

The Large Luzon Forest Rat, or Luzon Forest Rat (Bullimus luzonicus) is a species of rodent, the first of three to be described in the genus Bullimus. It is in the diverse family Muridae. It is found only in the Philippines. The rat has been recorded in Aurora, Benguet, and Camarines Sur provinces, and in Balbalasang, Kalinga province.
