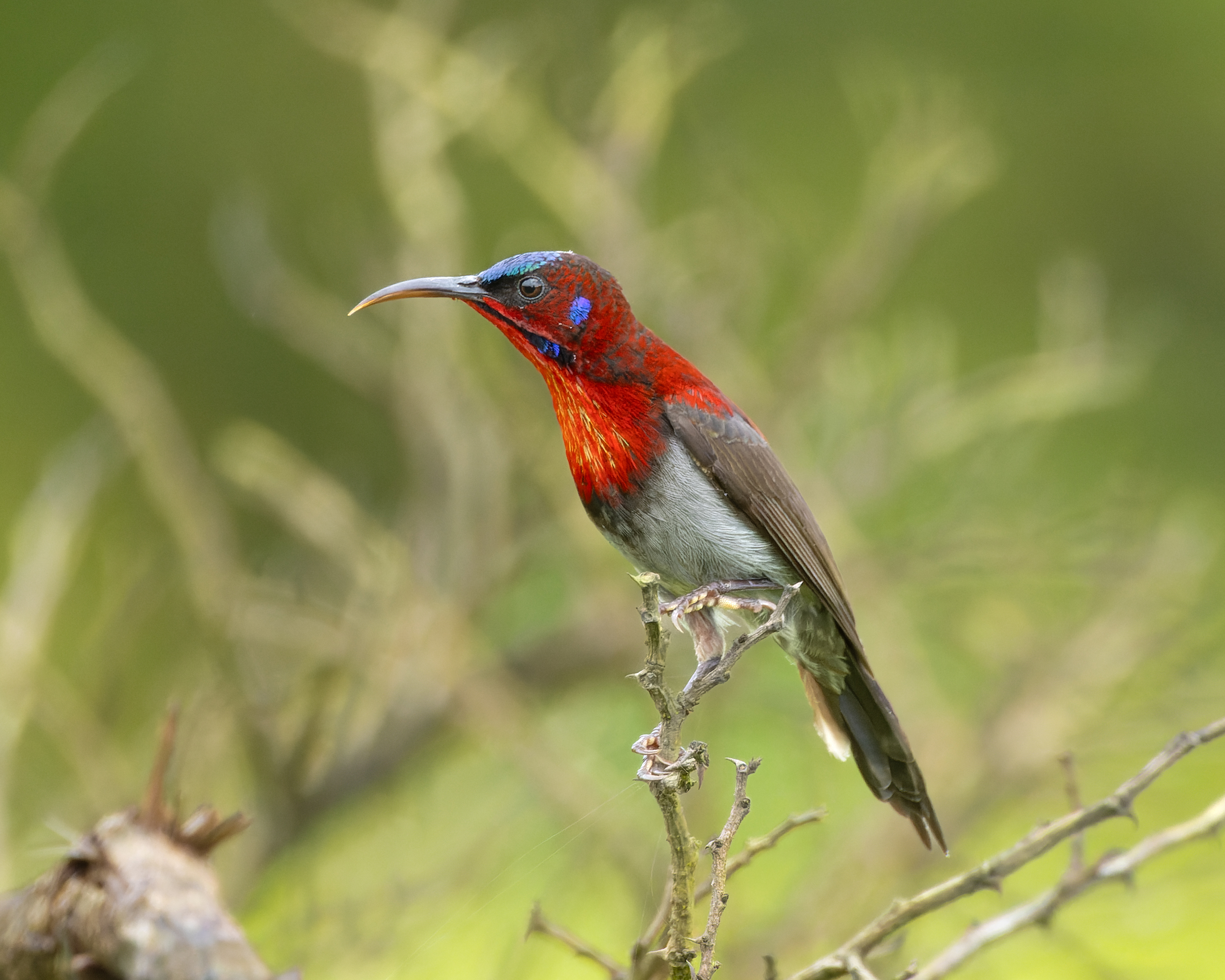
- Male in Mahabaleshwar, Maharashtra, India.

Conservation status
- Least Concern (IUCN 3.1)

Scientific classification
- Kingdom: Animalia
- Phylum: Chordata
- Class: Aves
- Order: Passeriformes
- Family: Nectariniidae
- Genus: Aethopyga
- Species: A. vigorsii

Binomial name
- Aethopyga vigorsii (Sykes, 1832)

= Vigors's sunbird =

Species of bird

Vigors's sunbird (Aethopyga vigorsii), Sahyadri sunbird, or western crimson sunbird, is a species of sunbird which is endemic to the Western Ghats of India. It has been considered as a subspecies of the crimson sunbird (Aethopyga siparaja) but it does not have the central tail as elongated and is restricted in its distribution.

The male has a scarlet throat and breast, while the rest of its under parts are uniformly grey. Its wings are grey-brown and lack yellowish-olive edges. However, it is yellow on the lower back and tail is bottle green.

The female's upperparts are dark olive, while its underparts are grey. A male who has not yet matured is similar to the female, but it has a dull scarlet throat and breast.

The species is distributed mainly in the northern Western Ghats but has been reported from the Nilgiris. It was named after Irish-born zoologist Nicholas Aylward Vigors by Colonel William Henry Sykes.
