= Camiguin forest rat =

Conservation status
- Vulnerable (IUCN 3.1)

Scientific classification
- Kingdom: Animalia
- Phylum: Chordata
- Class: Mammalia
- Order: Rodentia
- Family: Muridae
- Genus: Bullimus
- Species: B. gamay

Binomial name
- Bullimus gamay Rickart, Heaney & Tabaranza, 2002
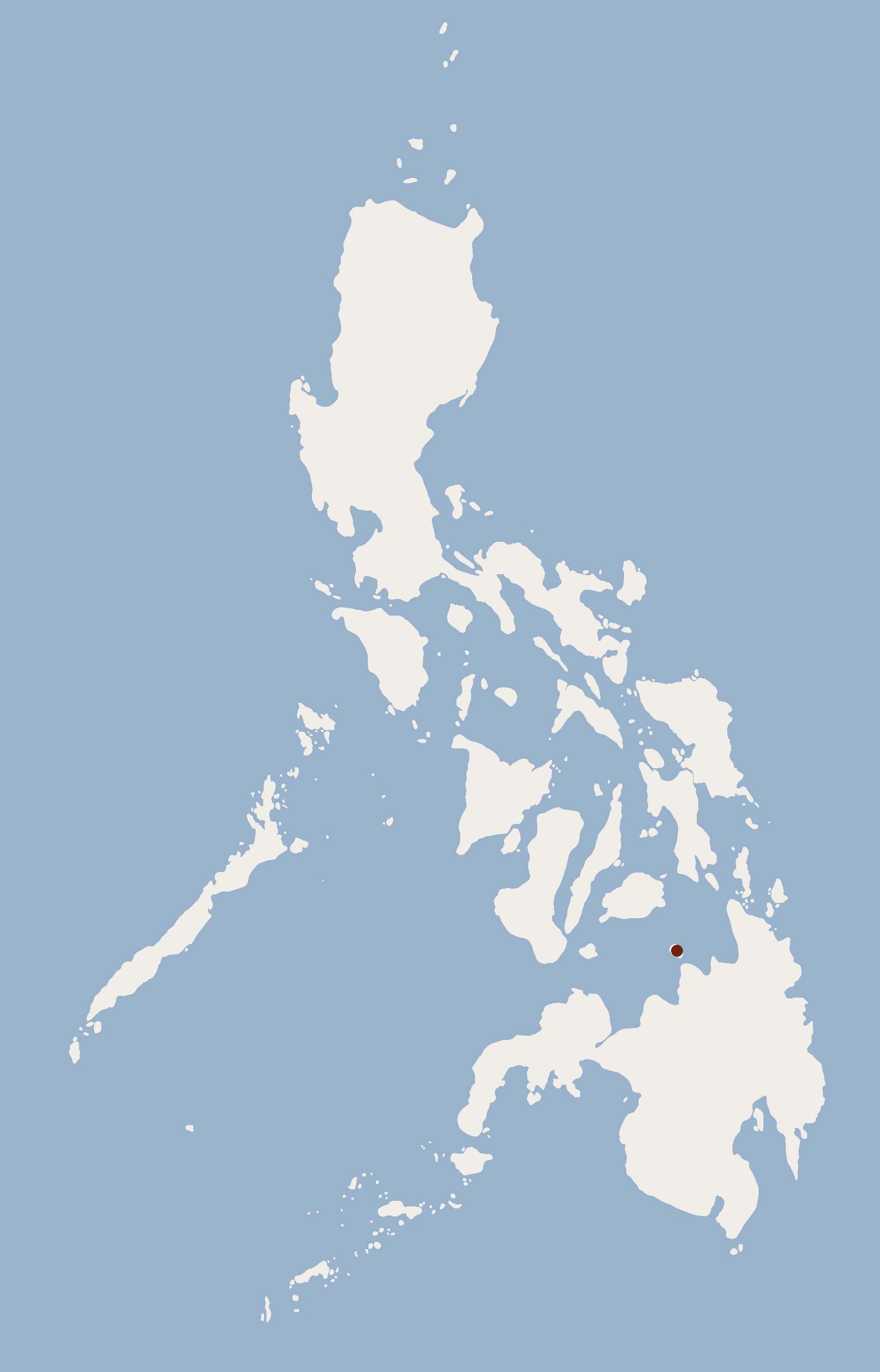
- Distribution of Camiguin forest rat

Species of rodent

Camiguin forest rat, or Camiguin bullimus (Bullimus gamay) is one of four species of rodents in the genus Bullimus. It is endemic to the island of Camiguin, the Philippines.
