= Carleton's forest rat =

Scientific classification
- Kingdom: Animalia
- Phylum: Chordata
- Class: Mammalia
- Order: Rodentia
- Family: Muridae
- Genus: Bullimus
- Species: B. carletoni

Binomial name
- Bullimus carletoni Heaney et al., 2021

Species of rodent

The Carleton's forest rat (Bullimus carletoni) is a species of rodent in the genus Bullimus and the family Muridae. It is reported from the Caramoan Peninsula in southern Luzon, Philippines in the year 2021 by Heaney et al. B. carletoni is associated with partially disturbed forest habitat over limestone and ophiolitic soils. It is a nocturnal animal and endemic to Philippines.
