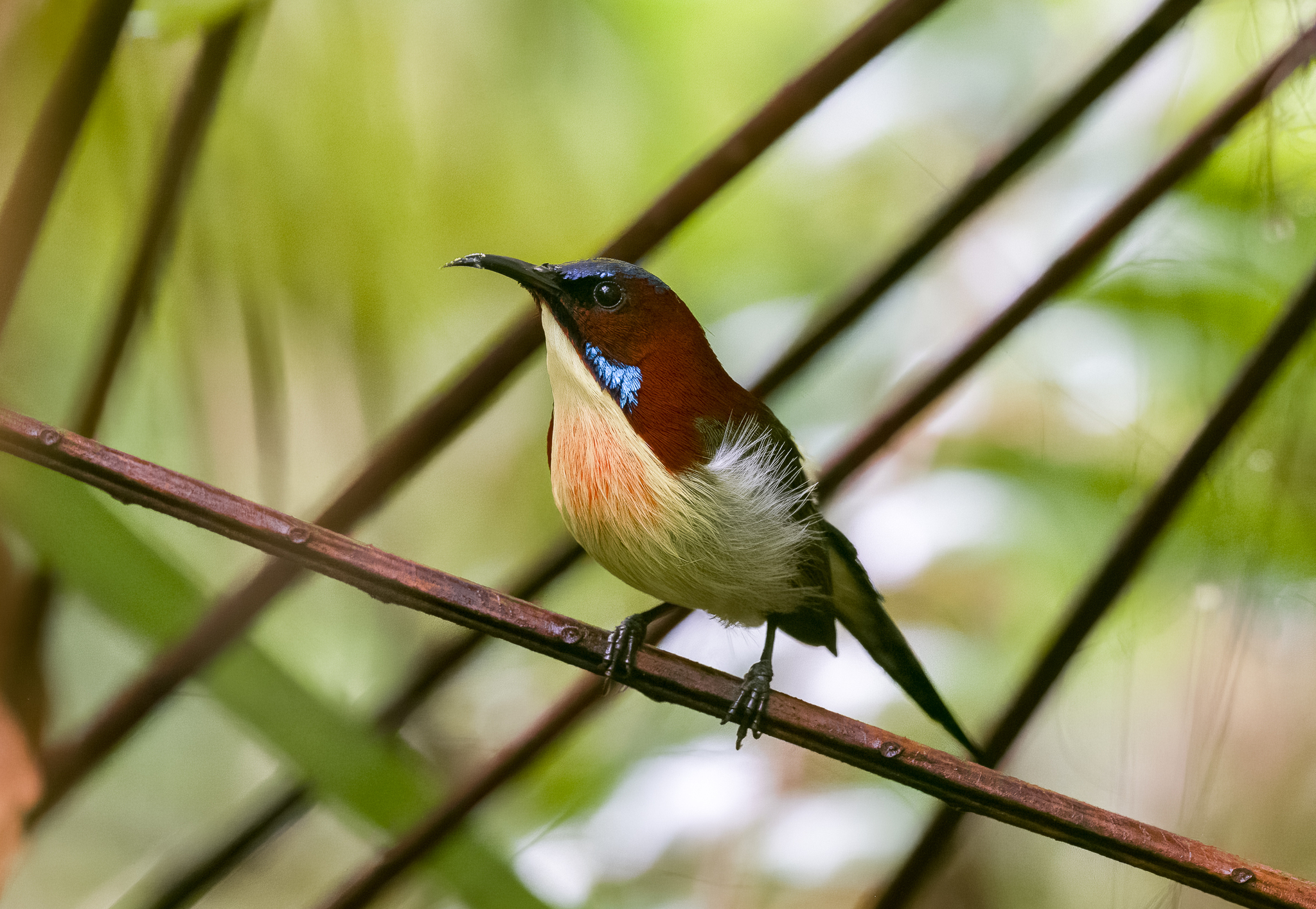

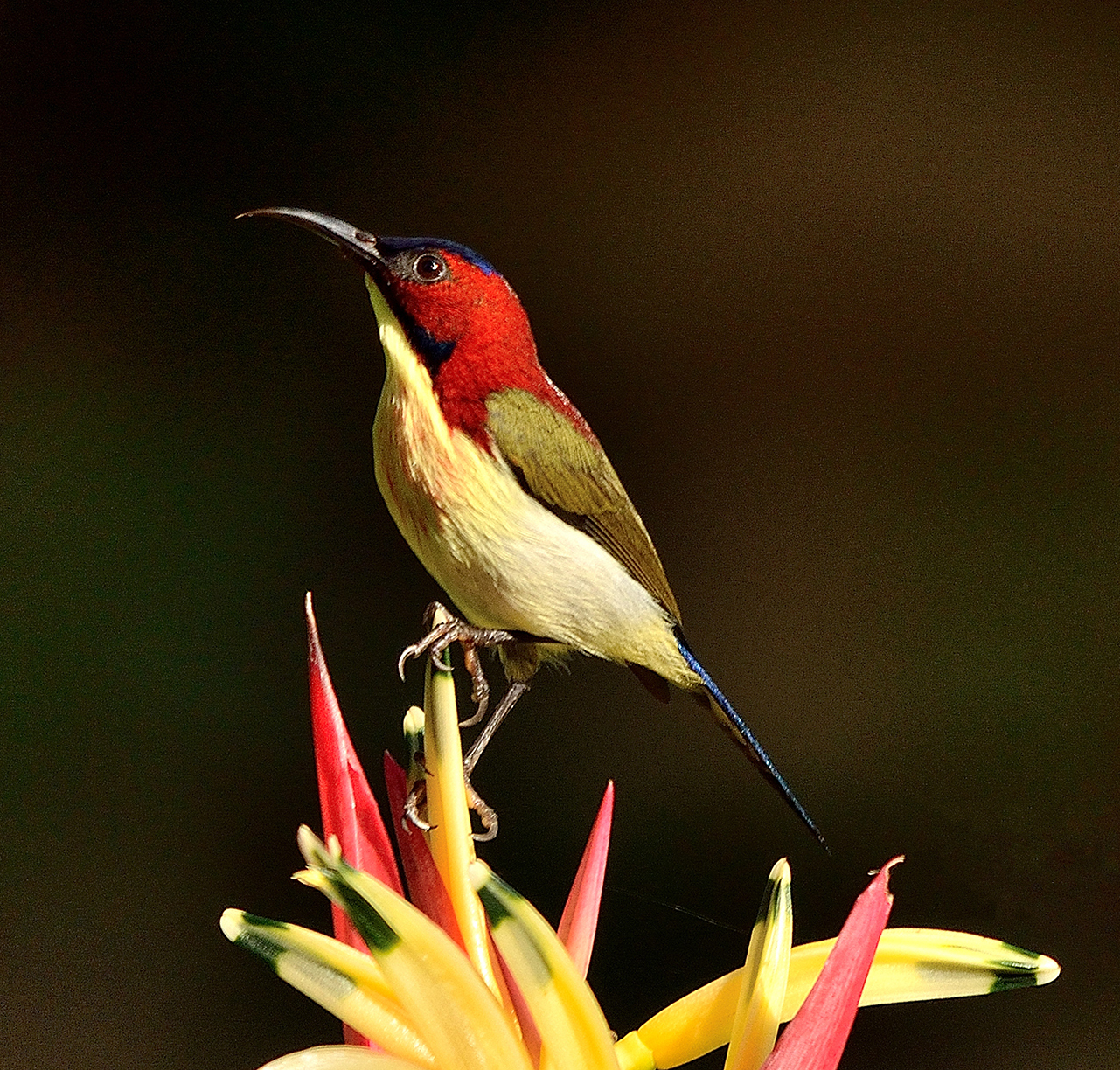
- in Palawan

Conservation status
- Least Concern (IUCN 3.1)

Scientific classification
- Kingdom: Animalia
- Phylum: Chordata
- Class: Aves
- Order: Passeriformes
- Family: Nectariniidae
- Genus: Aethopyga
- Species: A. shelleyi

Binomial name
- Aethopyga shelleyi Sharpe, 1876

= Lovely sunbird =

Species of bird

The lovely sunbird (Aethopyga shelleyi) is a bird species in the family Nectariniidae. It is endemic to the Philippines. Its natural habitats are subtropical or tropical moist lowland forests and tropical moist montane forests.

== Description and taxonomy ==
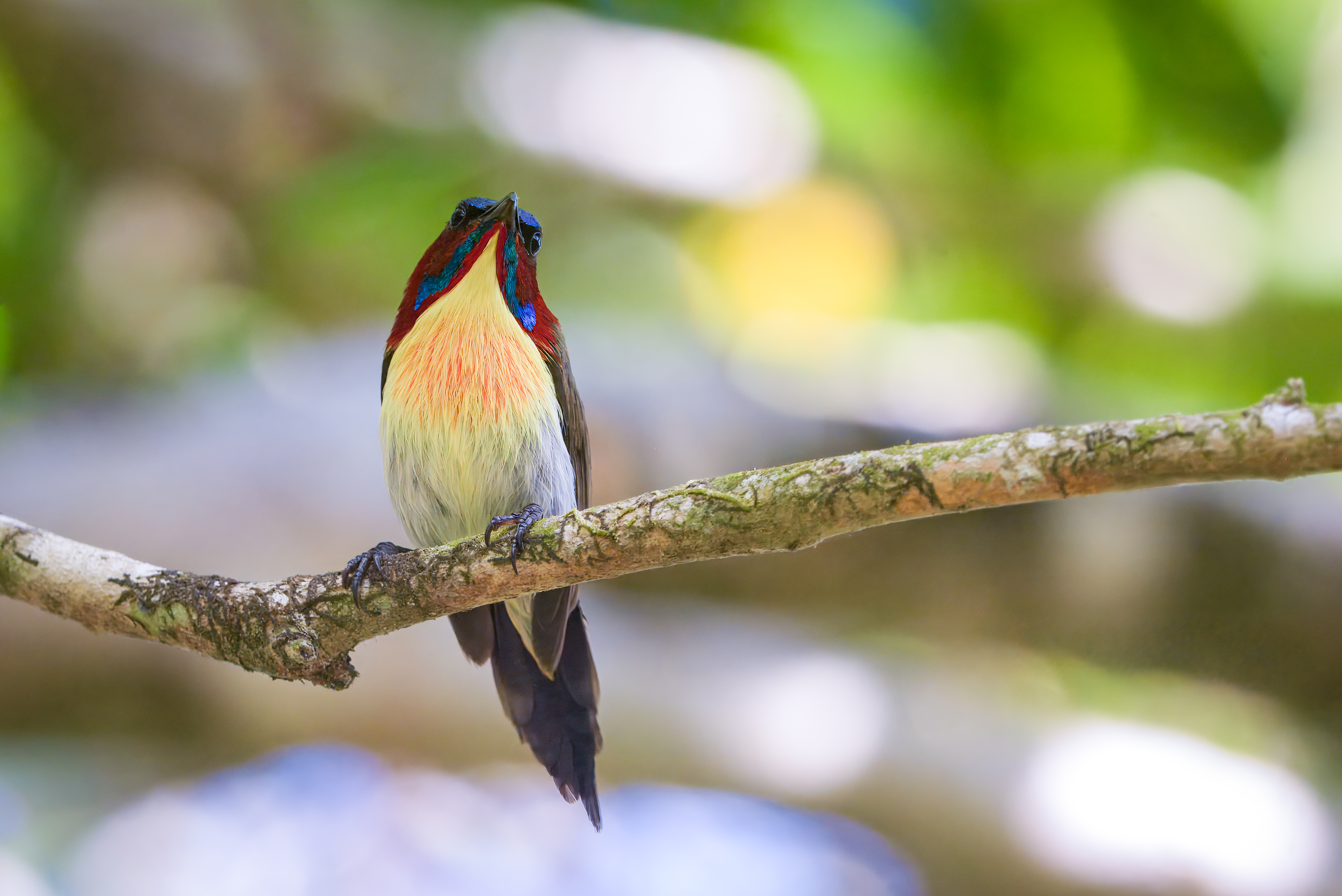
A male lovely sunbird showing the distinctive red streaking on its breast.

The lovely sunbird was formerly considered conspecific with the handsome sunbird but is differentiated by the prominent red streaking on its breast versus the latter's plain yellow breast. Measuring roughly 8 to 11 centimeters in total length, it ranks among the smallest sunbird species endemic to the Philippine archipelago. While the male displays a brilliant crimson back and head alongside its finely streaked yellow chest, the duller female lacks these red breast markings entirely. This species is monotypic.

== Ecology and behavior ==
Not much is known about its diet, but it is presumed to have a typical sunbird diet consisting of small fruits, insects, and nectar, especially from mistletoes. Typically seen singly, in pairs, or small groups, it often joins mixed-species flocks. Breeding has been recorded in February, but otherwise its breeding habits remain unrecorded.

== Habitat and conservation status ==
Its natural habitats are tropical moist lowland forest, montane forest, second growth and plantations up to 2,000 meters above sea level.

The IUCN has classified the species as being of Least Concern as it has a large range and it is common throughout with the population believed to be stable as it is able to tolerate even degraded habitat. However, deforestation in Palawan continues due to slash and burn farming, mining, illegal logging and land conversion.

The whole of Palawan was designated as a Biosphere Reserve; however, protection and enforcement of laws has been difficult and these threats still continue. It occurs in just one protected area in Puerto Princesa Subterranean River National Park.
