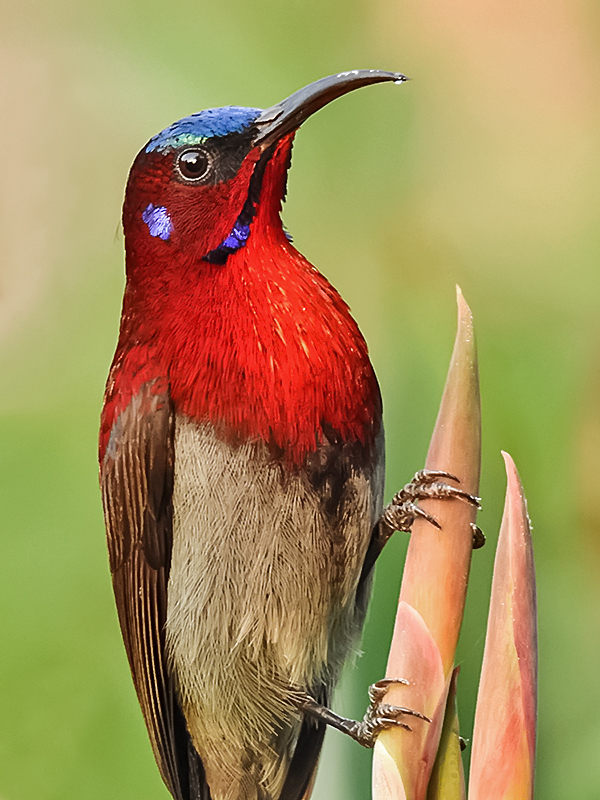
- Vigors's sunbird from Maharashtra, India

Scientific classification
- Kingdom: Animalia
- Phylum: Chordata
- Class: Aves
- Order: Passeriformes
- Family: Nectariniidae
- Genus: Aethopyga; Cabanis, 1851

Type species
- Certhia siparaja (Crimson sunbird) Raffles, 1822

Species
- See text

= Aethopyga =

Genus of birds

Aethopyga is a genus of birds in the sunbird family Nectariniidae. Species in this genus are found in South Asia, Southeast Asia and parts of China. Many species such as the grey-hooded sunbird, Apo sunbird, metallic-winged sunbird, handsome sunbird, and Lina's sunbird are endemic to the Philippines.

== Taxonomy ==
The genus Aethopyga was introduced in 1851 by the German ornithologist Jean Cabanis. The name combines the Ancient Greek aithos meaning "fire" or "burning heat" with pugē meaning "rump". The type species was designated as the crimson sunbird by George Robert Gray in 1855.

=== Species ===
The genus contains 21 species:

Image	Common name	Scientific name	Distribution
	Grey-hooded sunbird	Aethopyga primigenia	Philippines.
	Apo sunbird	Aethopyga boltoni	Philippines
	Tboli sunbird	Aethopyga tibolii	southern Mindanao in the Philippines
	Lina's sunbird	Aethopyga linaraborae	Mindanao in the Philippines
	Flaming sunbird	Aethopyga flagrans	northern Philippines.
	Maroon-naped sunbird	Aethopyga guimarasensis	Philippines (Negros Island, Panay and Guimaras).
	Metallic-winged sunbird	Aethopyga pulcherrima	Philippines.
	Elegant sunbird	Aethopyga duyvenbodei	Indonesia
	Lovely sunbird	Aethopyga shelleyi	Philippines.
	Handsome sunbird	Aethopyga bella	Philippines.
	Mrs. Gould's sunbird	Aethopyga gouldiae	Bangladesh, Bhutan, Laos, Myanmar, Nepal, Thailand, India, Vietnam and Southern China.
	Green-tailed sunbird	Aethopyga nipalensis	Indian subcontinent, stretching eastwards into parts of Southeast Asia.
	White-flanked sunbird	Aethopyga eximia	Indonesia.
	Fork-tailed sunbird	Aethopyga christinae	China, Hong Kong, Laos, and Vietnam.
	Black-throated sunbird	Aethopyga saturata	Bangladesh, Bhutan, Cambodia, China, India, Laos, Malaysia, Myanmar, Nepal, Thailand and Vietnam.
	Crimson sunbird	Aethopyga siparaja	India, through Nepal, Bangladesh and Myanmar to Indonesia and Brunei.
	Magnificent sunbird	Aethopyga magnifica	Negros Island, Panay, Cebu, Tablas Island and Romblon.
	Vigors's sunbird	Aethopyga vigorsii	Western Ghats of India.
	Javan sunbird	Aethopyga mystacalis	Java and Bali, Indonesia.
	Temminck's sunbird	Aethopyga temminckii	Borneo, Sumatra, Malaysia, and south west Thailand
	Fire-tailed sunbird	Aethopyga ignicauda	Bangladesh, Bhutan, India, Myanmar, Nepal, Thailand and Tibet.
