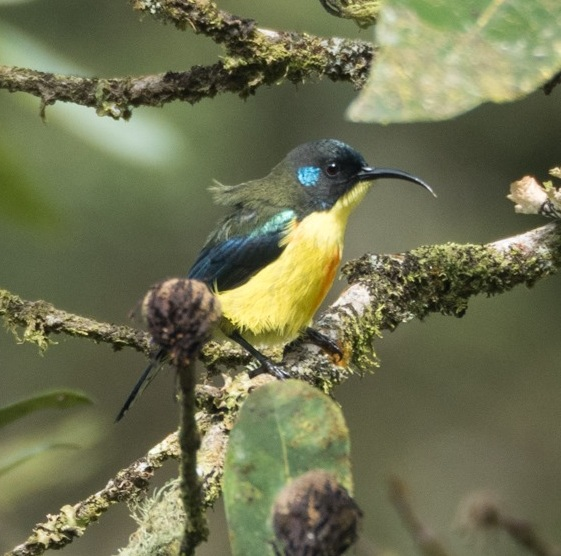
- Male
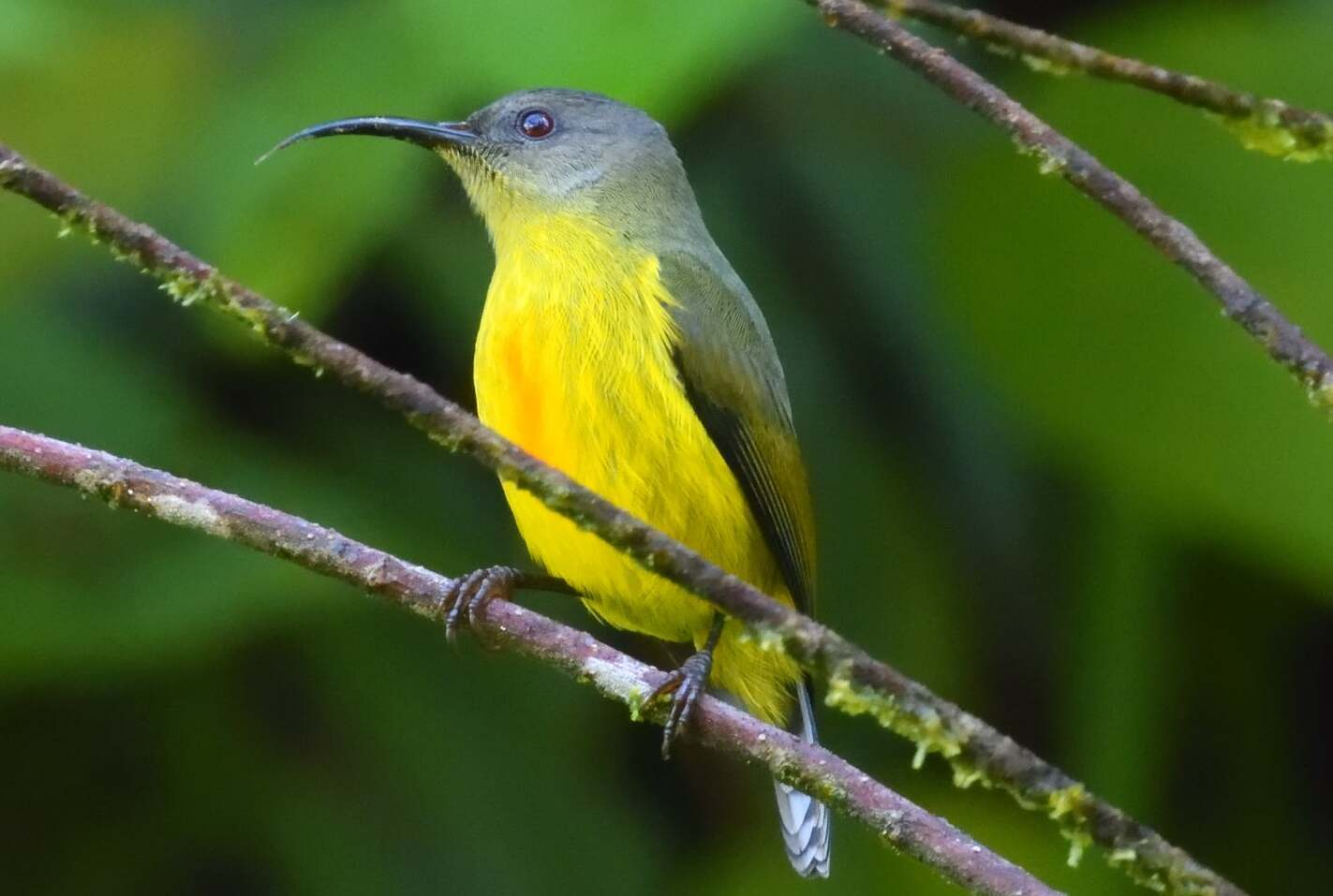
- Female

Conservation status
- Near Threatened (IUCN 3.1)

Scientific classification
- Kingdom: Animalia
- Phylum: Chordata
- Class: Aves
- Order: Passeriformes
- Family: Nectariniidae
- Genus: Aethopyga
- Species: A. linaraborae

Binomial name
- Aethopyga linaraborae Kennedy, Gonzales & Miranda, 1997

= Lina's sunbird =

Species of bird

Lina's sunbird (Aethopyga linaraborae) is a species of bird in the family Nectariniidae. It is endemic to mountains in the island of Mindanao in the Philippines. It is one of the most striking sunbirds in the country with the male having an iridescent blue color and an orange spot on its yellow breast. It is named after Dioscoro S. Rabor's wife, Lina, who assisted Dioscoro on expeditions. Its natural habitat is tropical moist montane forest above 1000m. It is threatened by habitat loss.

== Description and taxonomy ==
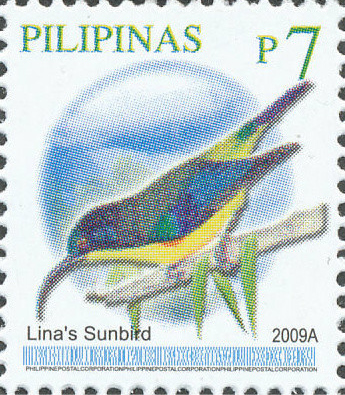
A Philippine stamp in 2009 depicting the Lina's sunbird

This is a small sunbird found only in the highland forests of East Mindanao. This species exhibits sexual dimorphism in which the male has an irridescent blue crown, cheek and wing. The female has an all gray head, olive wings and some faint streaking on the underparts. Both male and female have an orange mark in the middle of the chest, yellow underparts and an olive back. LIke all sunbirds, it has a long curved bill.

Its call is described as a long series of high pitched tweets with an upward inflection.

This species was formerly conspecific with the Apo sunbird but was split by Robert Kennedy, Pedro Gonzales and Hector Miranda in 1997. They decided to name this species after Lina Rabor whose husband is Dioscoro Rabor who is known for as the "Father of Philippine Biology and Conservation" and described 69 bird species

== Ecology and behavior ==
This species has not yet been comprehensively studied. It is presumed to have a typical sunbird diet of primarily nectar and supplemented with the occasional insect.

Males in breeding condition with enlarged testes have been collected n May, but breeding times are not yet fully understood.

== Habitat and conservation status ==
It occupies montane mossy forest from 970 to 2,000 m and above in the mountains of Eastern Mindanao.

IUCN has assessed this bird as near threatened making it the only Philippine sunbird that is not assessed as least concern as its range is heavily restricted to the mountains of east Mindanao. Despite its limited range, it is said to be locally common. As it occurs in rugged and inaccessible mountains, a large portion of its habitat has remained intact. However, it is still affected by habitat loss through deforestation, mining, land conversion and slash-and-burn - just not to the same extent as lowland forest. Mt. Tagubud in New Bataan, where it is mainly seen by birdwatchers, has faced considerable deforestation.
