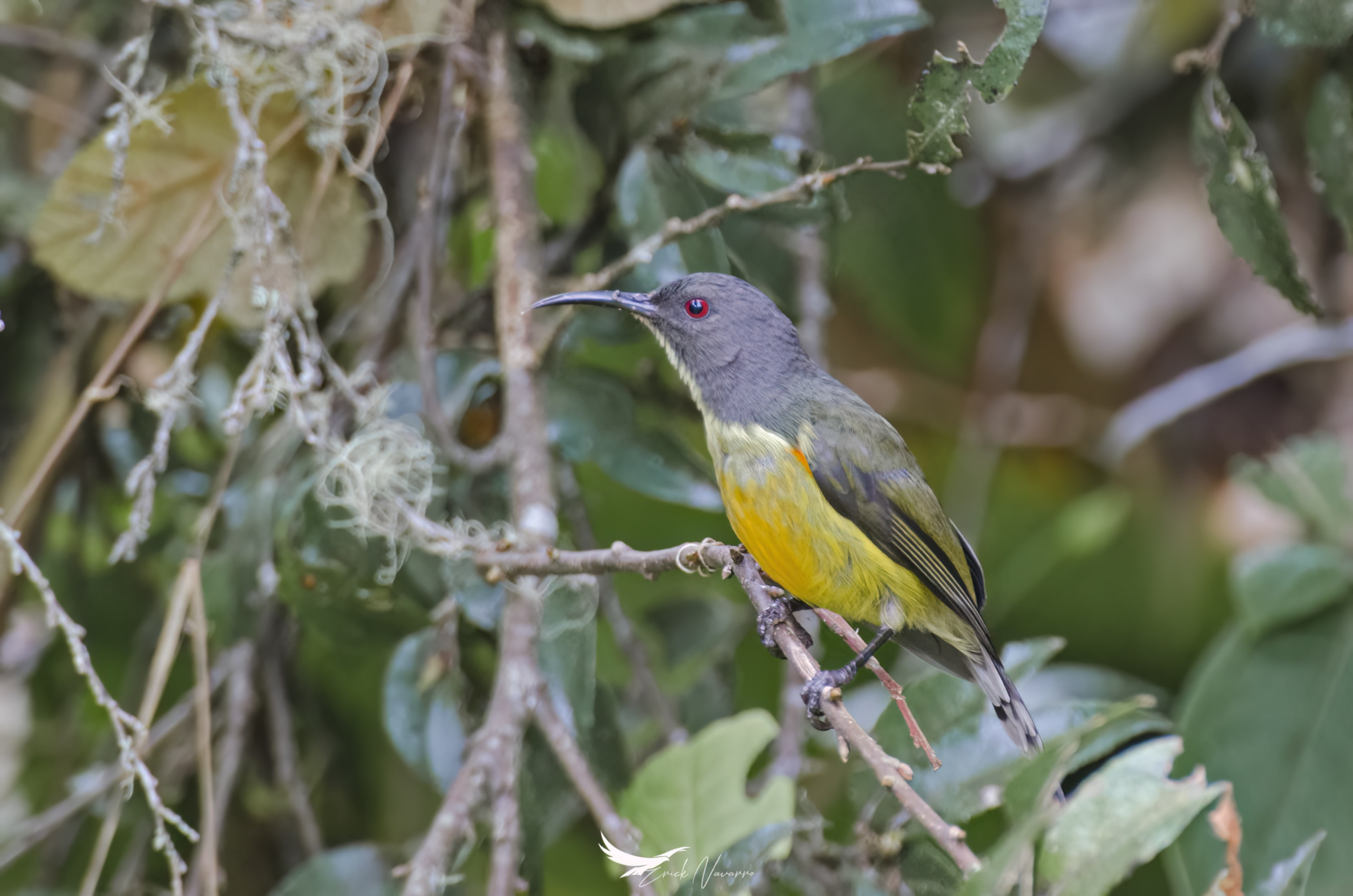
- Male ssp. boltoni

Conservation status
- Least Concern (IUCN 3.1)

Scientific classification
- Kingdom: Animalia
- Phylum: Chordata
- Class: Aves
- Order: Passeriformes
- Family: Nectariniidae
- Genus: Aethopyga
- Species: A. boltoni

Binomial name
- Aethopyga boltoni Mearns, 1905

= Apo sunbird =

Species of bird

The Apo sunbird (Aethopyga boltoni) is a species of bird in the sunbird family Nectariniidae. It is endemic to the island of Mindanao in the Philippines. It is found in tropical moist montane forests at elevations ranging from 820 to 2,000 metres (2,690 to 6,560 ft) above sea level.

== Description ==
The Apo sunbird has a curved bill, yellow chest and olive wings. Unlike females, males have a yellow stripe along their throat, a bluer tail, and an orange tuft in the middle of their chest.

Vocalizations are high-pitched and rapid, with frequent chips.

== Taxonomy ==
The Apo sunbird was formally described in 1905 by the American ornithologist Edgar Alexander Mearns from specimens collected from Mount Apo on the island of Mindanao. He coined the binomial name Aethopyga boltoni.

Two subspecies are recognised:

- A. b. boltoni Mearns, 1905 – east-central, east Mindanao
- A. b. malindangensis Rand & Rabor, 1957 – west Mindanao; slightly brighter and has more orange on the male's breast than the nominate

The Tboli sunbird (Aethopyga tibolii) was formerly recognised as a subspecies.

This species also included the Lina's sunbird until 1997 when it was described as a separate species named in honor of Lina Rabor, Dioscoro S. Rabor's wife who would assist expeditions.

== Ecology and behavior ==
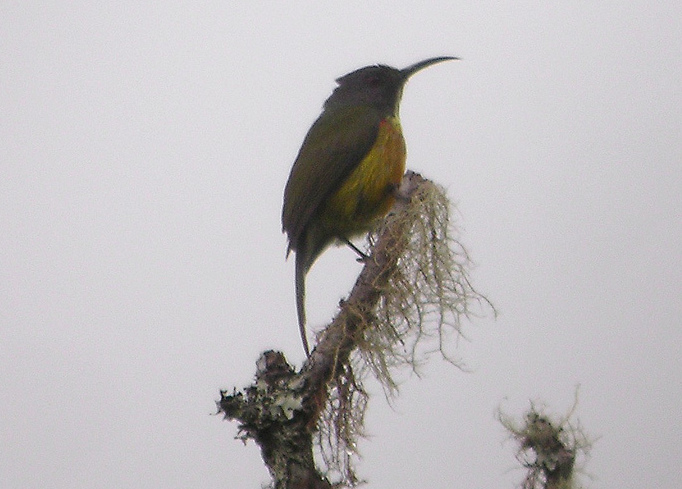
An Apo Sunbird ssp. boltoni

This species is presumed to feed primarily on nectar but will also supplement its diet with insects especially when it is nesting. This species is found both singly and in pairs, and forms mixed species flocks with other forest birds.

The Apo sunbird has been recorded breeding in January through July. Only 2 nests have been found, the first in 1904 and the second in 1995. The nests were suspended high in the air, roughly 24 metres (79 ft). The dimensions of the nest were 8 x 16 cm, with a side entrance of 3 cm, and were constructed of moss, spider eggs, and insect cases.

== Habitat and conservation status ==
The Apo sunbird is a bird local to the island of Mindanao in the Philippines. It can be found in mountainous areas in the western and central parts of the island, specifically Mount Apo, Mount Kitanglad, and Mount Malindang. Its natural habitat is in montane rainforest ranging in altitude from 820 to 2,000 metres (2,690 to 6,560 ft).

The IUCN has classified the species as Least Concern but formerly listed it as near threatened. Despite its limited range, it is said to be locally common. The Apo sunbird occurs at similar densities to its kin, the lovely sunbird at 49.1 individuals per square kilometre. 10% of the mapped area is occupied, which places the number of individuals at 37,000. This would be equal to about 25,000 mature individuals. However, the Apo sunbird is thought to live at slightly lower densities than its counterparts, so it is believed 25,000 mature individuals live in the mountainous region of Mindanao.

As it occurs in rugged and inaccessible mountains, this has allowed a large portion of its habitat to remain intact. However, there it is still affected by habitat loss through deforestation, mining, land conversion and slash-and-burn.
