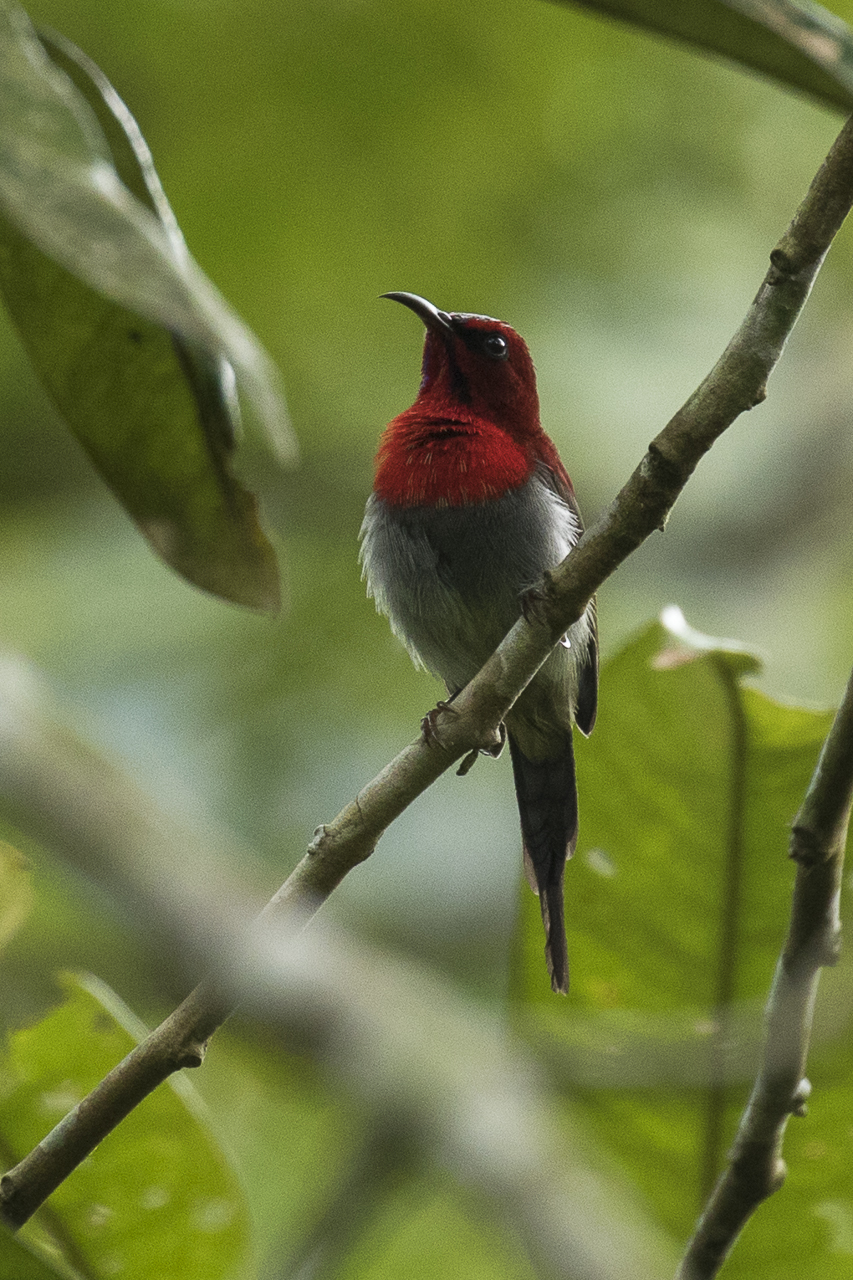
- At Java, Indonesia

Conservation status
- Least Concern (IUCN 3.1)

Scientific classification
- Kingdom: Animalia
- Phylum: Chordata
- Class: Aves
- Order: Passeriformes
- Family: Nectariniidae
- Genus: Aethopyga
- Species: A. mystacalis

Binomial name
- Aethopyga mystacalis (Temminck, 1822)

= Javan sunbird =

Species of bird

The Javan sunbird or scarlet sunbird (Aethopyga mystacalis) is a species of bird in the family Nectariniidae. It is endemic to Java and Bali, Indonesia. Its natural habitats are subtropical or tropical moist lowland forest and subtropical or tropical moist montane forest.
