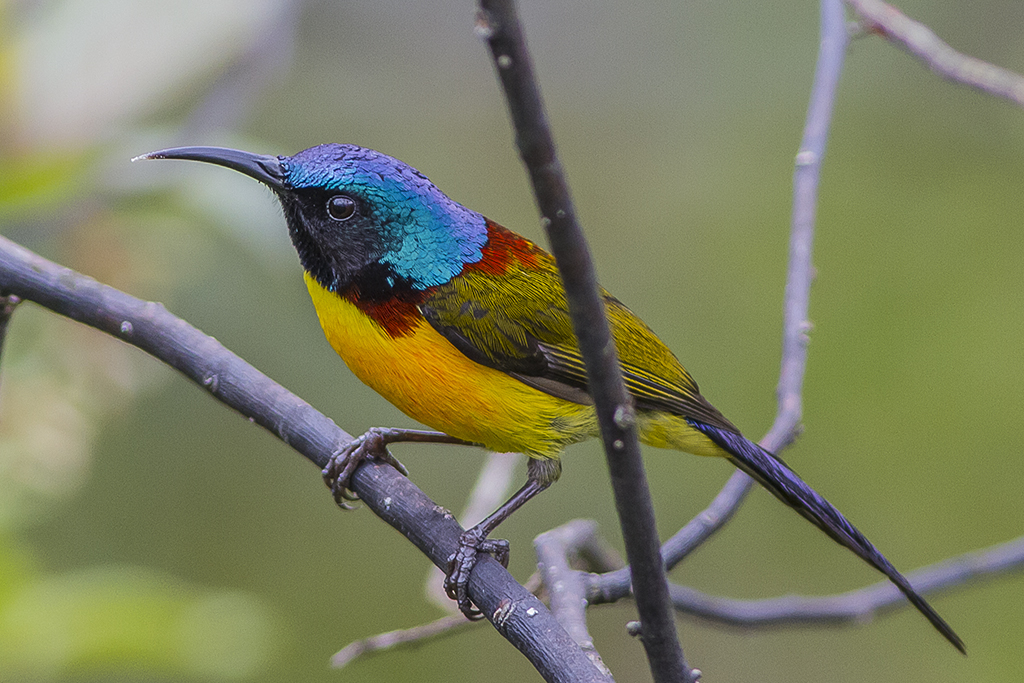
- A. nipalensis nipalensis, male (♂)
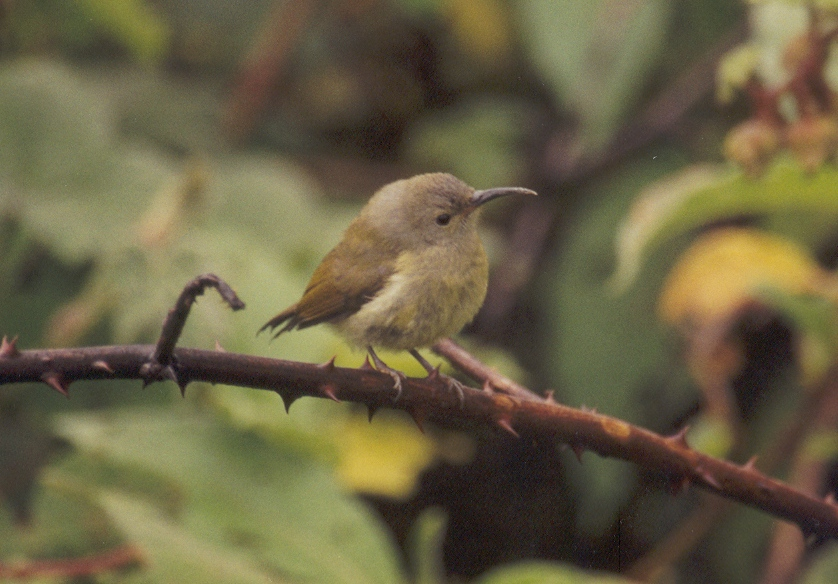
- A. nipalensis angkanensis, female (♀)

Conservation status
- Least Concern (IUCN 3.1)

Scientific classification
- Kingdom: Animalia
- Phylum: Chordata
- Class: Aves
- Order: Passeriformes
- Family: Nectariniidae
- Genus: Aethopyga
- Species: A. nipalensis

Binomial name
- Aethopyga nipalensis (Hodgson, 1836)

= Green-tailed sunbird =

Species of bird

The green-tailed sunbird (Aethopyga nipalensis) or Nepal yellow-backed sunbird is a species of bird in the family Nectariniidae.

It is found in Nepal and the northern regions of the Indian subcontinent, stretching eastwards into parts of Southeast Asia.

Its natural habitats are temperate forests and subtropical or tropical moist montane forests. In southeast Szechwan and Yunnan, it lives in open mountain woods with moss-covered trees, from 1825 to 3350 meters elevation.
