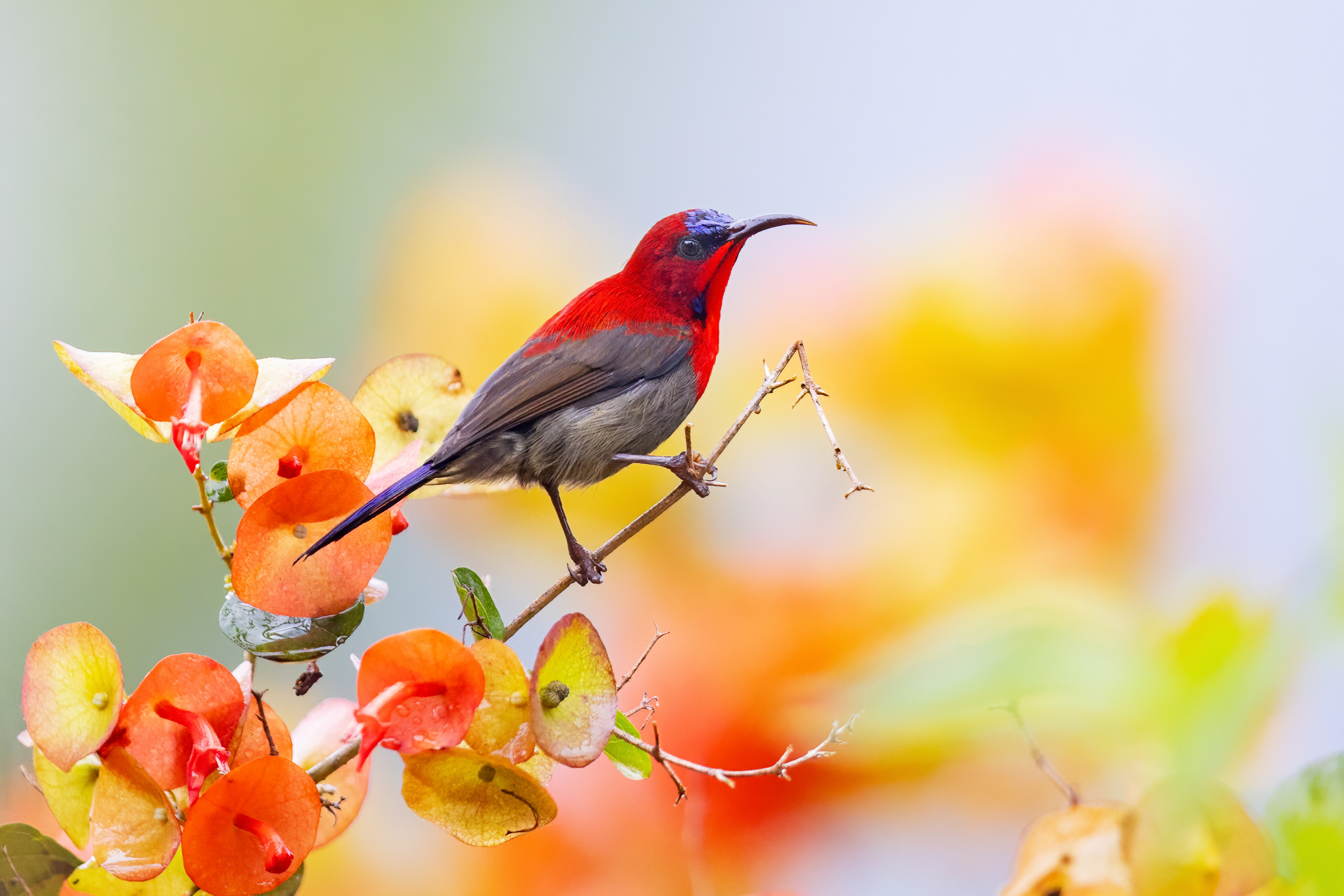
- Male
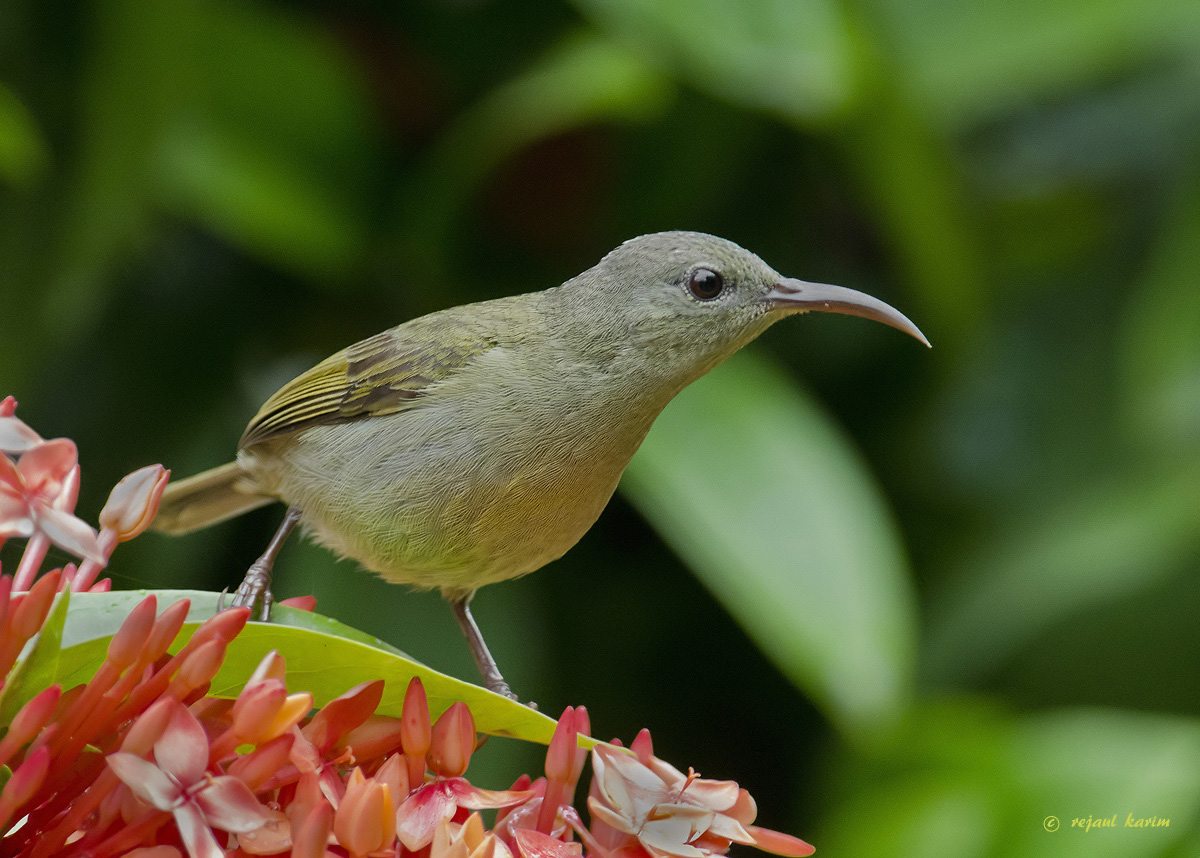
- Female

Conservation status
- Least Concern (IUCN 3.1)

Scientific classification
- Kingdom: Animalia
- Phylum: Chordata
- Class: Aves
- Order: Passeriformes
- Family: Nectariniidae
- Genus: Aethopyga
- Species: A. siparaja

Binomial name
- Aethopyga siparaja (Raffles, 1822)

= Crimson sunbird =

Species of bird

Call of crimson sunbird.

The crimson sunbird (Aethopyga siparaja) is a species of bird in the sunbird family which feed largely on nectar. They may also take insects, especially when feeding their young. Flight is fast and direct on their short wings. Most species can take nectar by hovering like a hummingbird, but usually perch to feed. It is the unofficial national bird of Singapore that is locally known as "Shuge", as declared by the Nature Society Singapore.

== Description ==
Crimson sunbirds are tiny, only 11 cm long. They have medium-length thin down-curved bills and brush-tipped tubular tongues, both adaptations to their nectar feeding. The adult male has a crimson breast and maroon back, with black malar stripes. The rump is yellow and the belly is olive. The female has an olive-green back, yellowish breast and white tips to the outer tail feathers. In most of the range, males have a long green-blue tail, but A.s. nicobarica of the Nicobar Islands and the former subspecies A. vigorsii (Western crimson sunbird) of the Western Ghats of India lack the long central tail feathers. Their call is chee-cheewee.

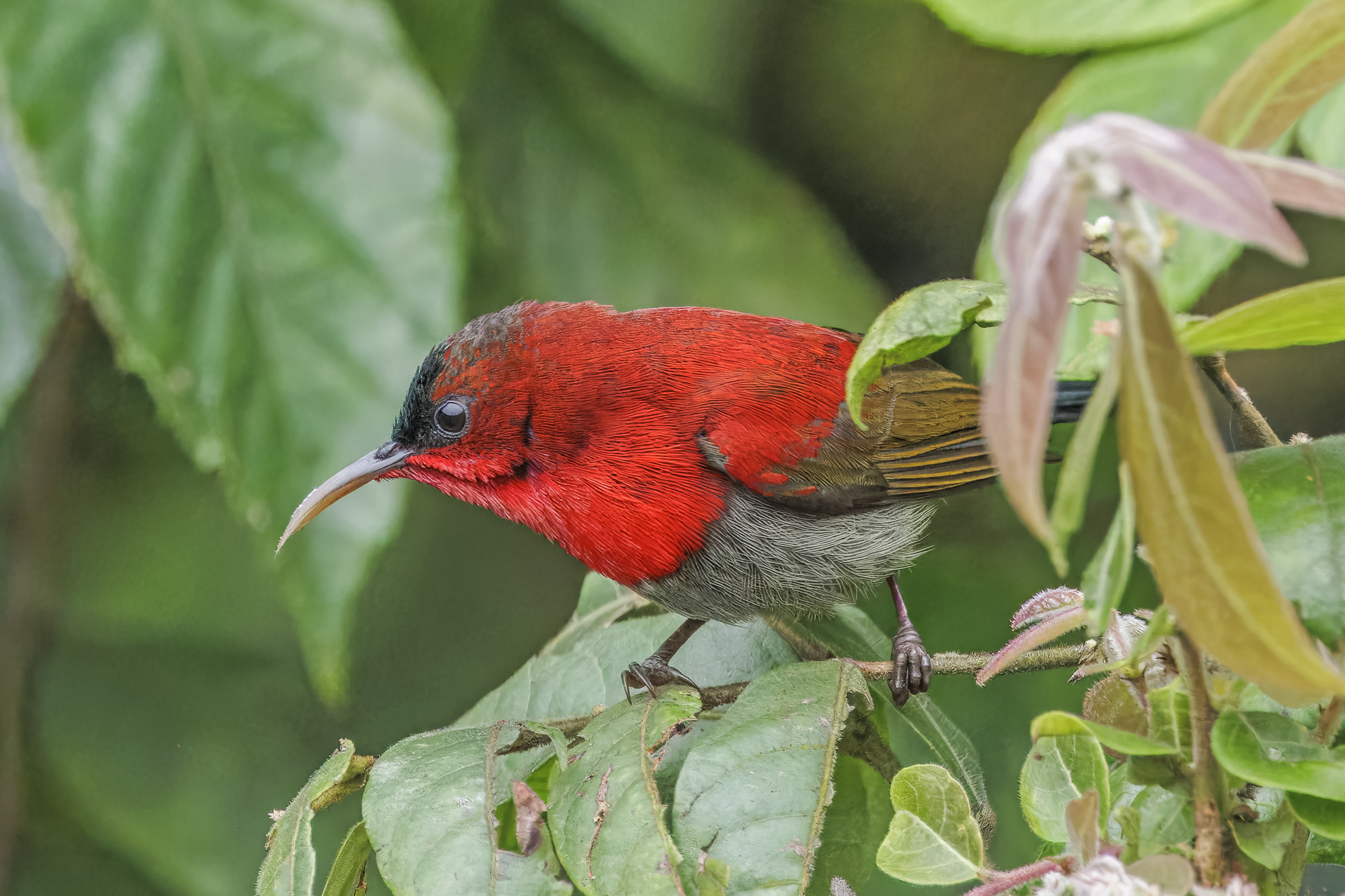
typical side view of male

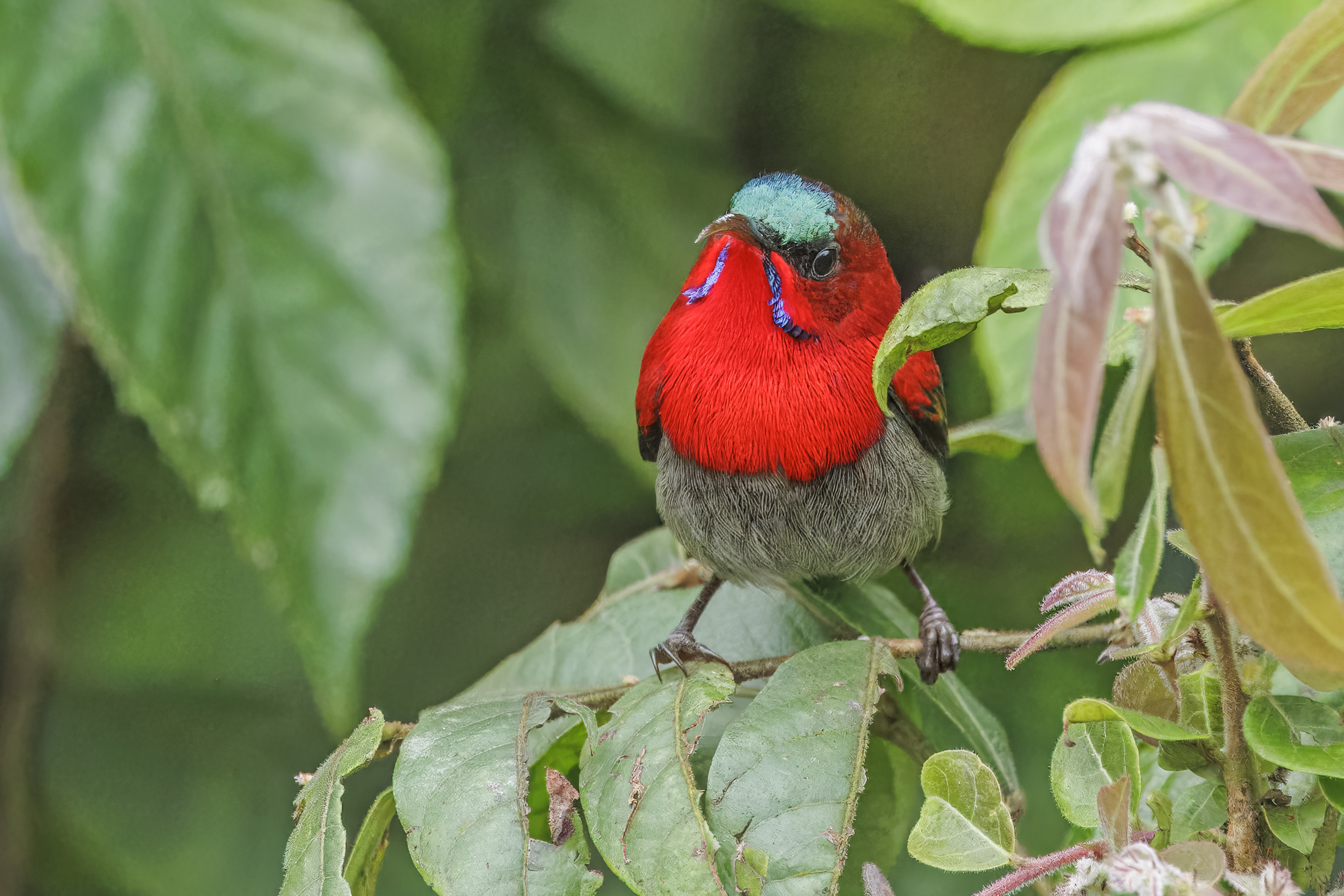
showing irridescent cap and 'moustache'

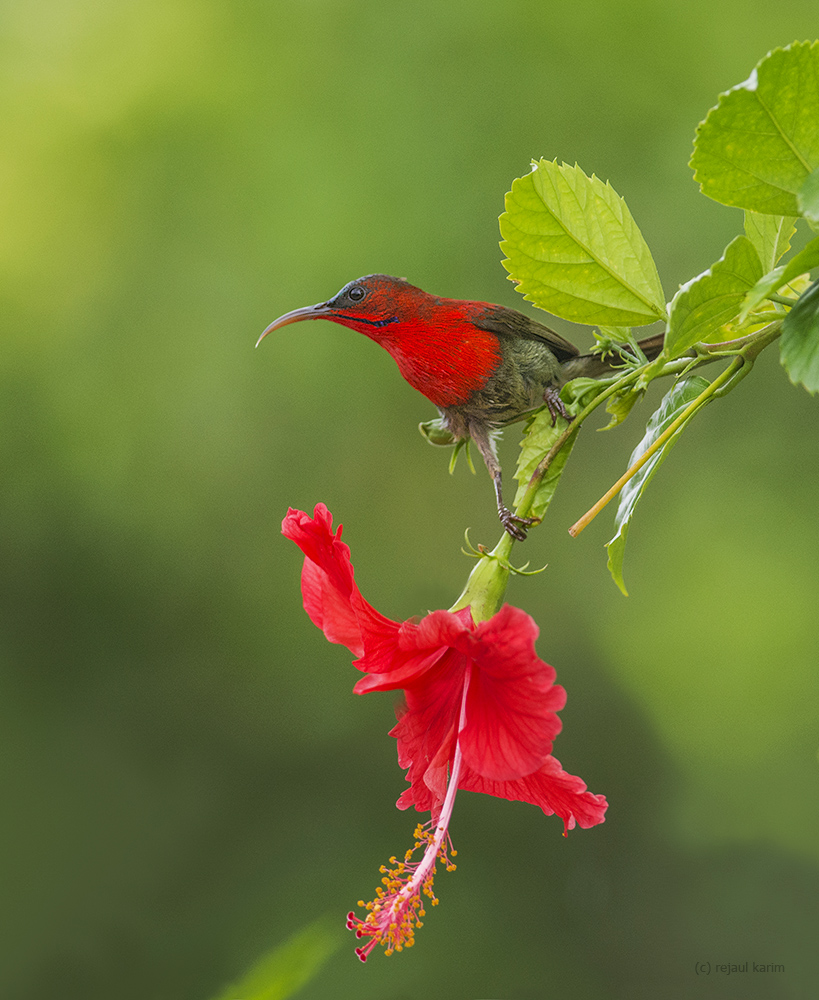
male Feeding on Hibiscus sp.

== Distribution and habitats ==
The crimson sunbird is a resident breeder in tropical southern Asia from India, through Nepal, Pakistan, Bangladesh and Myanmar to Indonesia and Brunei. Two or three eggs are laid in a suspended nest in a tree. This species occurs in forest and cultivated areas.
