= Edgar Alexander Mearns =

American surgeon, ornithologist & field naturalist (1856–1916)

Edgar A. Mearns
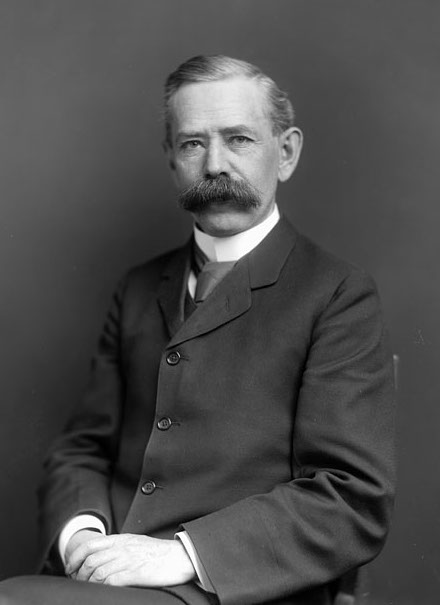
- Born: September 11, 1856; Highland Falls, New York
- Died: November 1, 1916 (aged 60); Washington, D.C.
- Education: Columbia College of Physicians and Surgeons
- Known for: co-founder of the American Ornithologists' Union
- Spouse: Ella Wittich

Edgar Alexander Mearns (September 11, 1856 – November 1, 1916) was an American surgeon, ornithologist and field naturalist. He was a founder of the American Ornithologists' Union.

== Life ==
Mearns was born in Highland Falls, New York, to Alexander and Nancy Reliance Mearns (née Clarswell). His grandfather Alexander was of Scottish origin and moved to Highland Falls in 1815. Edgar Mearns was educated at the Donald Highland Institute (Highland Falls). He attended the Columbia College of Physicians and Surgeons, graduating in 1881.

In 1881, he married Ella Wittich of Circleville, Ohio. The couple had one son and one daughter. Their son was born in 1886 and died in 1912.

Mearns became a doctor in the U.S. Army. From 1882 to 1899 he served the military as a surgeon. From 1899 to 1903, he was a medical officer in several army institutions. From 1903 to 1904 and from 1905 to 1907, he traveled to the Philippines; he had to interrupt his journey in 1904 because he came down with a parasitic disease. In 1905 a trip led him to Guam. As major and surgeon in the army, Mearns was appointed medical officer to the International Boundary Commission; he reported on the fauna and trees of the boundary between Mexico and the United States in his 1907 Mammals of the Mexican Boundary of the United States. In 1909 he retired from the army with a rank of a lieutenant colonel.

Later that year Theodore Roosevelt invited Mearns to accompany the Smithsonian-Roosevelt African Expedition as naturalist. From 1911 to 1912 he was a member of the Childs Frick expedition in Africa to collect and prepare specimens of birds that Frick later presented to the Smithsonian Institution.

Mearns co-founded the American Ornithologists' Union in 1883. He scientifically described several birds and other animal species, like the Taita thrush, the Apo sunbird, the Boran cisticola, the Chihuahuan grasshopper mouse, and the rufous-headed tailorbird. He died in Washington, D.C., at the age of 60.

== Eponyms ==
Several animal taxa are named in honor of Mearns: five birds; seven mammals, including Mearns's pocket gopher (Thomomys bottae mearnsi); and a reptile, Mearns' rock lizard (Petrosaurus mearnsi).
