= Ronald Timoner =

Filipino Roman Catholic Bishop (born 1971)

His Excellency, The Most Reverend Ronald Anthony Timoner DD, STL
- Bishop of Pagadian
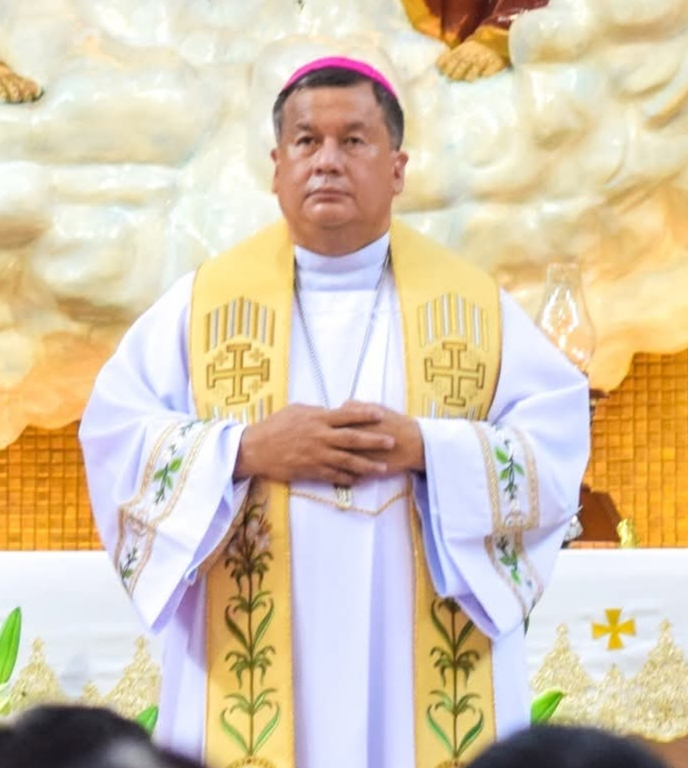
- Timoner in 2025
- Church: Roman Catholic Church
- Province: Ozamis
- Diocese: Pagadian
- Appointed: April 2, 2025
- Installed: August 13, 2025
- Predecessor: Ronald Lunas
- Previous posts: Diocesan Administrator of Daet (2017–19; 2023–25); Vicar General of the Diocese of Daet (2019–2025)

Orders
- Ordination: May 1, 1997 by Benjamin Almoneda
- Consecration: August 13, 2025 by Martin Jumoad

Personal details
- Born: Ronald Anthony Parco Timoner; August 13, 1971 (age 55) Daet, Camarines Norte, Philippines
- Denomination: Roman Catholic
- Residence: Bishop's Residence, Balangasan District, Pagadian City, Philippines
- Education: Holy Rosary Minor Seminary; University of Santo Tomas; Pontifical University of Saint Thomas Aquinas
- Motto: Surge et ambula (Latin for 'Arise and walk') (Note: From Acts 3:6)
- Coat of arms: Ronald Anthony Timoner's coat of arms

Ordination history
History
Priestly ordination
- Ordained by: Benjamin Almoneda
Episcopal consecration
- Principal consecrator: Martin Jumoad
- Co-consecrators: Rex Andrew Alarcon; Gilbert Garcera

Styles of Ronald Anthony P. Timoner
- Reference style: His Excellency; The Most Reverend
- Spoken style: Your Excellency
- Religious style: Bishop

Ronald Anthony "Tonet" Parco Timoner (born August 13, 1971) is a Filipino Catholic prelate who has served as Bishop of Pagadian in the Philippines since 2025.

== Early life and education ==
Timoner was born on August 13, 1971, in Daet, Camarines Norte, Philippines. He studied philosophy at the Holy Rosary Minor Seminary in Naga, Camarines Sur, and theology at the University of Santo Tomas. He earned his licentiate in sacred theology at the Pontifical University of Saint Thomas Aquinas in Rome.

He is the younger brother of Gerard Timoner III, who leads the Dominicans worldwide as the 88th master of the Order of Preachers.

== Priesthood ==
Timoner was ordained to the priesthood on May 1, 1997, for the Diocese of Daet. Early in his ministry, he served as parochial vicar in the parishes in Paracale and Talisay. He later held several key roles at the Holy Trinity College Seminary in Labo, including spiritual director, prefect of discipline, and procurator. From 2004 to 2008, he ministered abroad as chaplain of the Church of Saint Thomas in Milan, Italy.

Upon his return, he was appointed chancellor of the Diocese of Daet, a post he held until 2016, while also taking on the role of director of the SPACFI-Socio-Pastoral Action Center Foundation in Daet beginning in 2015. Since 2017, he has served as parish priest of San Juan Bautista Parish in Daet.

In April 2017, Timoner was appointed as the diocesan administrator of Daet, after Bishop Gilbert Armea Garcera was appointed as archbishop of Lipa. Timoner held that position until Garcera's successor, Rex Andrew Alarcon, was installed in March 2019. On April 2, 2019, Alarcon appointed Timoner as vicar general of the diocese. Upon Alarcon's appointment as archbishop of Cáceres, Timoner was reappointed as the diocesan administrator on May 16, 2024. His second tenure as diocesan administrator ceased after Herman Abcede was installed in May 2025.

== Episcopate ==
On April 2, 2025, Pope Francis appointed Timoner as the sixth bishop of Pagadian, succeeding Ronald Lunas, who died in 2024. His episcopal consecration and canonical installation took place on August 13, 2025, his 54th birthday, at the Santo Niño Cathedral Parish Church in Pagadian. He is the last Filipino bishop appointed by Francis to be consecrated and installed.

== Notes ==
Catholic Church titles
Preceded by Ronald Ignacio Lunas	Bishop of Pagadian; August 13, 2025 – present	Incumbent
