= Cathedral of the Most Holy Trinity in Daet =

Roman Catholic church in Camarines Norte, Philippines

Daet Cathedral
- Cathedral of the Most Holy Trinity
- Catedral de la Santísima Trinidad (Spanish)
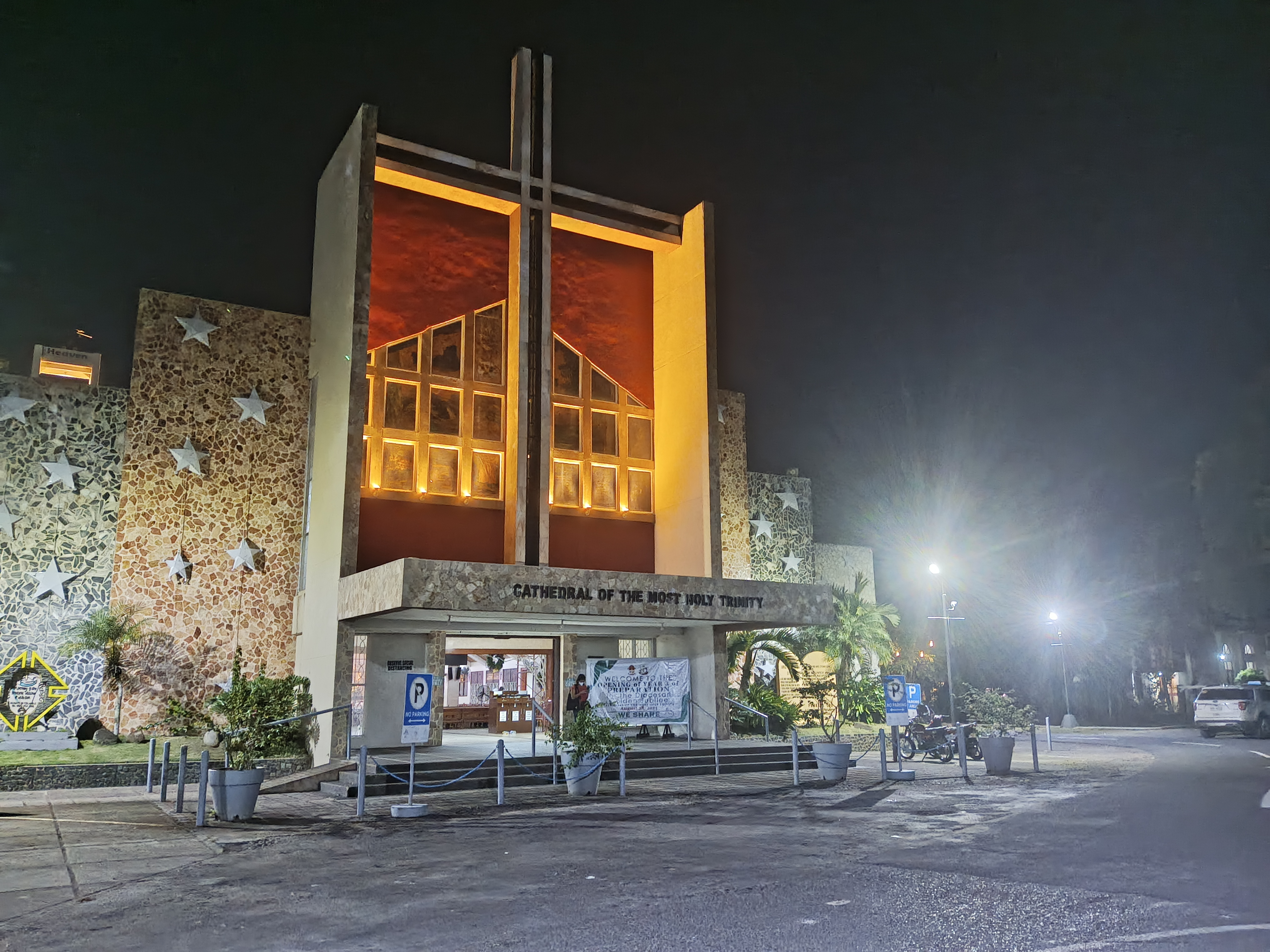
- Cathedral facade at night in 2023

- Location in Camarines Norte Location in Luzon Location in the Philippines
- 14°07′27″N 122°56′53″E
- Location: Gahonon, Daet, Camarines Norte
- Country: Philippines
- Denomination: Roman Catholic

History
- Status: Active
- Founded: September 1, 1984
- Founder(s): Bishop Celestino R. Enverga, D.D.
- Dedication: Most Holy Trinity

Architecture
- Architectural type: Church building
- Groundbreaking: 1974
- Completed: 1984

Specifications
- Materials: Stone, cement and bricks

Administration
- Province: Caceres
- Metropolis: Caceres
- Archdiocese: Caceres
- Diocese: Daet

Clergy
- Bishop(s): Herman G. Abcede, R.C.J.
- Rector: Eduardo G. Regore

The Cathedral of the Most Holy Trinity, also known as Daet Cathedral, is a prominent Latin Rite Roman Catholic cathedral located in Daet, Camarines Norte, Philippines. It was erected in 1984 and serves as the seat of the Diocese of Daet, which was created by a papal bull on May 27, 1974.

== History ==
Daytime image of cathedral

The construction of the parish church took a long time of preparation. It started long before Camarines Norte became a diocese. During the incumbency of Msgr. Antonino O. Reganit as parish priest of Daet, the cathedral compound was acquired from the Magana Family.

On January 25, 1970, a Deed of Donation was signed, transferring two hectares of land from the Magana siblings—Simeona Magana, Lucio Magana (war-time Mayor of Daet), Paciano Magana, Amadeo Magana Sr., and Solomon Magana—to the Catholic Church. This donation, formalized with Msgr. Antonino O. Reganit, then parish priest of Daet, laid the groundwork for the construction of the Pro-Cathedral of Christ the King, which would later become the Cathedral of the Most Holy Trinity in Daet. This pivotal act of generosity marked the beginning of a significant chapter in the religious and cultural history of Camarines Norte.

Construction of a complex building was started, the center of which was the proposed main altar. Reganit died before completion.

September 1, 1974, was the canonical erection day of the diocese, with the ordination and installation of the first bishop, Celestino R. Enverga. Enverga completed construction, with modifications, and launched other infrastructure projects: the bishop's residence with the annexed parish house, the cathedral, the Carillon Multi-purpose hall, the library, museum and printing house, the Blessed Sacrament Chapel, the Kolbe's House (now the Holy Trinity Cathedral Rectory Office), the Bishop Enverga Hall, the concrete fencing of the compound with guard-house in the two gates, and the stand-by power house.

The cathedral church was consecrated on September 1, 1984, on the first decade celebration of the diocese. It was dedicated to the Most Holy Trinity by Jose T. Sanchez, Archbishop of Nueva Segovia, with Wilfredo D. Manlapaz as preacher and Pablo Balon as rector.

On November 2, 1995, a strong typhoon destroyed the cathedral's roof and a series of typhoons damaged the church again in 2005.

== List of recent Rectors ==
- Rev. Fr. Luis M. Puno, Jr. (2006–2008)
- Rev. Fr. Joselito M. Quiñones (2008–2009)
- Most Rev. Gilbert Garcera, D.D. (2009–2017)
- Most Rev. Rex Andrew Alarcon, D.D. (2019-2024)
- Rev Fr. Eduard G. Regore Jr. (2024-Present)
