= Rolando Tria Tirona =

Filipino prelate

The Most Reverend Rolando Octavus Joven Tria Tirona OCD, D.D.
- Metropolitan Archbishop Emeritus of Cáceres
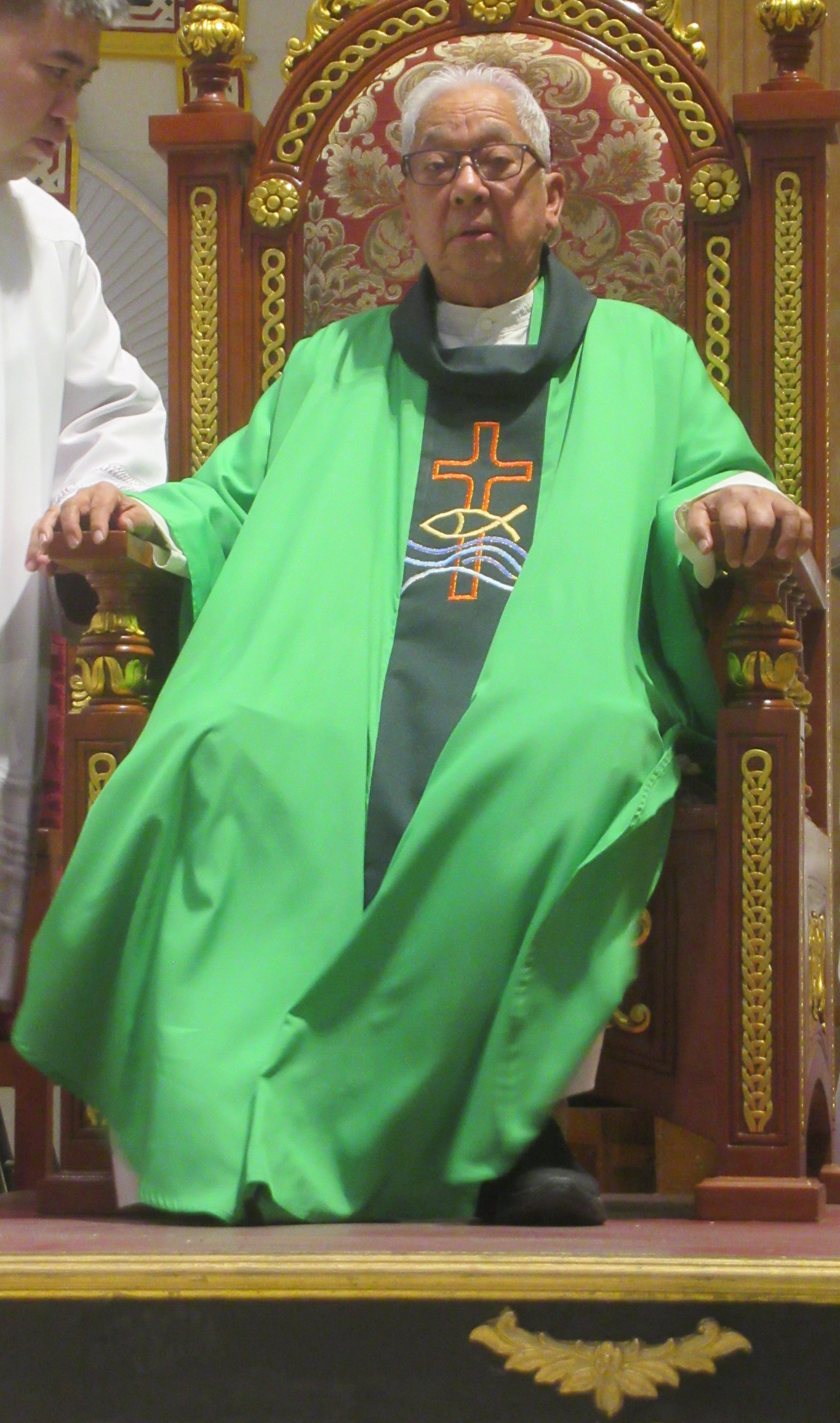
- Tirona (August 2024, Baliwag)
- See: Cáceres
- Appointed: September 8, 2012
- Installed: November 14, 2012
- Retired: February 22, 2024
- Predecessor: Leonardo Z. Legaspi
- Successor: Rex Andrew C. Alarcón
- Previous posts: Auxiliary Bishop of Manila (1994–1996); Titular Bishop of Vulturaria (1994–1996); Bishop of Malolos (1996–2003); Prelate of Infanta (2003–2012)

Orders
- Ordination: April 21, 1974 by Anastasio Cardinal Ballestrero
- Consecration: December 29, 1994 by Jaime Cardinal Sin

Personal details
- Born: Rolando Octavus Joven Tria Tirona; July 22, 1946 (age 80) Kawit, Cavite, Philippines
- Denomination: Roman Catholic
- Education: Centro Escolar University
- Alma mater: San Beda University
- Motto: Christi Sumus ('We Belong to Christ', Romans 14:8)
- Coat of arms: Rolando Octavus Joven Tria Tirona's coat of arms

Ordination history
History
Priestly ordination
- Ordained by: Cardinal Anastasio Ballestrero
Episcopal consecration
- Principal consecrator: Cardinal Jaime Sin
- Co-consecrators: Julio Labayen; Teodoro Buhain Jr.
Episcopal succession
Bishops consecrated by Rolando Tria Tirona as principal consecrator
- Rex Andrew C. Alarcon: March 19, 2019
- Luisito A. Occiano: June 21, 2024
- Styles
- Reference style: The Most Reverend
- Spoken style: Your Excellency
- Religious style: Archbishop

Rolando Octavus Joven Tria Tirona, OCD (born July 22, 1946), is a prelate of the Catholic Church in the Philippines. He is the Metropolitan Archbishop Emeritus of Cáceres in Naga, Philippines, serving from 2012 to 2024. Appointed to succeed the retiring Archbishop Leonardo Legaspi, Tirona resigned on May 2, 2024, and made Rex Andrew Alarcón, then Bishop of Daet, as his successor. Until Alarcón's installation, Tirona continued to serve as the archdiocese's archbishop as Apostolic Administrator.

== Biography ==
Rolando Tirona was born on July 22, 1946, in Kawit, he finished his elementary and secondary education at Centro Escolar University in 1952 and 1958. He completed a degree in political science at San Beda College before he entered San Carlos Seminary in Makati to finish philosophy in 1968. He entered Carmel on August 15, 1964, and solemnly professed vows on February 10, 1968. He was ordained priest on April 21, 1974, in Rome. He was ordained as bishop on December 29, 1994, at the Manila Cathedral.

He served as Auxiliary Bishop of Manila from 1994 to 1996. He was appointed apostolic administrator of Malolos in January 1996 and served as bishop of the Diocese of Malolos from 1996 to 2003. He became the bishop of Infanta in Quezon province for nine years (2003–2012).

== Archbishop of Caceres ==
On September 8, 2012, Pope Benedict XVI elevated Tirona to Archbishop of Caceres, replacing the retiring Leonardo Legaspi.

The Archdiocese of Cáceres is a Metropolitan See that comprises the Bicol region, while directly overseeing the third, fourth and fifth congressional districts of Camarines Sur and is centered in Naga. The Archdiocese, having been founded in 1595 in the Royal City of Nueva Caceres (modern-day Naga), is considered one of the oldest in the Philippines with Cebu, Segovia and Manila, and once had jurisdiction that stretched from Samar in the south to Isabela Province in the north. The seat of the Archdiocese is in Pilgrim City of Naga.

On April 21, 2024, Tria Tirona celebrated the Golden jubilee of his ordination in a thanksgiving Mass at the Naga Cathedral.

Catholic Church titles
Preceded by Cirilo R. Almario Jr.	Bishop of Malolos; December 14, 1996 – June 28, 2003	Succeeded by Jose F. Oliveros
Preceded by Julio Xavier Labayen	Prelate of Infanta; August 27, 2003 – September 8, 2012	Succeeded by Bernardino C. Cortez
Preceded by Leonardo Z. Legaspi	Archbishop of Caceres; November 14, 2012 – February 22, 2024	Succeeded by Rex Andrew Alarcon
