= Porta Mariae =

Roman Catholic memorial arch in Naga, Philippines

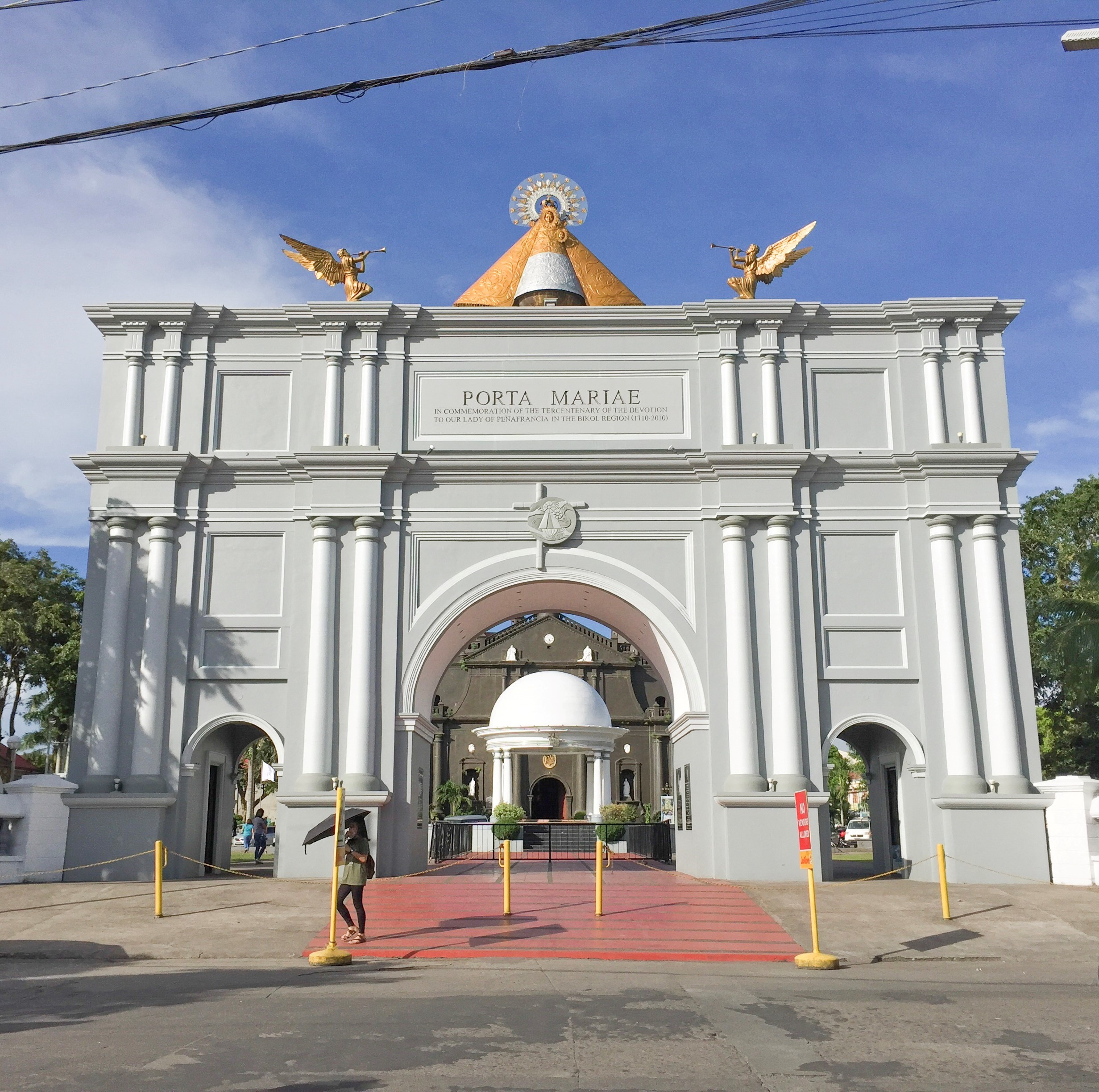
- Porta Mariae in 2018
- Interactive map of the Porta Mariae area

General information
- Type: Memorial arch
- Architectural style: Neoclassicism
- Location: Naga City
- Coordinates: 13°37′39″N 123°11′12″E
- Inaugurated: September 9, 2010
- Owner: Roman Catholic Archdiocese of Caceres

Height
- Height: 11 m (36 ft)

Dimensions
- Other dimensions: Wide: 18 m (59 ft); Deep: 4 metres (13 ft)

Design and construction
- Architect: Gian Paolo P. Priela
- Structural engineer: Noriel L. Villar

The Porta Mariae (Latin, "Marian Gate") is a memorial arch in Naga City commemorating the tercentenary of the devotion to Our Lady of Peñafrancia.

The arch, 18 metres (59 ft) wide, 4 metres (13 ft) deep and 11 metres (36 ft) high, is surmounted by a 10 feet (3 m) tall brass image of Our Lady of Peñafrancia and two angels on each side. The main portal’s two small gates each accommodate three persons, while the central portal accommodates at least eight persons.

The arch was commissioned by the Archdiocese of Cáceres, and its construction was financed by the Peñafrancia Devotees of Metro Manila Foundation Inc. with General Salvador Mison as its director. It was designed by architect Gian Paolo P. Priela and completed under the direction of engineer Noriel L. Villar. The Porta Mariae was blessed and inaugurated by Archbishop Leonardo Legaspi on 9 September 2010.
