= Timoner =

Timoner is a surname found in Spanish-heritage populations and among Ashkenazi Jews (region of Tymanivka, Ukraine).

- Chana Timoner (born 1951), Jewish U.S. Army chaplain
- Gerard Timoner (born 1958), Filipino priest, head of the Dominicans
- Guillermo Timoner (1926–2023), Spanish cyclist
- Ondi Timoner (born 1972), U.S. film director
- Ronald Timoner (born 1971), Filipino bishop, younger brother of Fr. Gerard Timoner
