= Herman Abcede =

Filipino Roman Catholic Bishop (born 1965)

His Excellency, The Most Reverend Herman Guinto Abcede RCJ, D.D., JCL
- Bishop of Daet
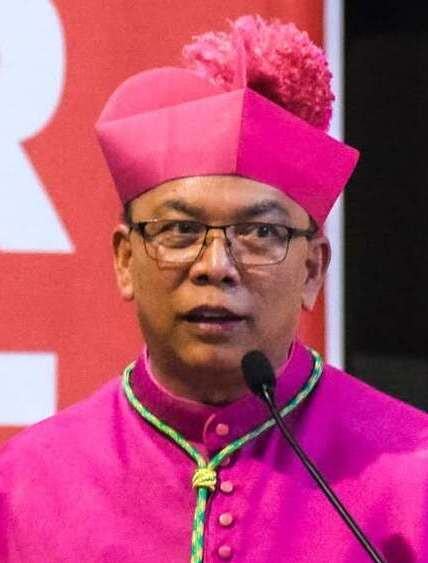
- Abcede in 2025
- Province: Cáceres
- See: Daet
- Appointed: March 4, 2025
- Installed: May 1, 2025
- Predecessor: Rex Andrew Alarcon
- Previous posts: Superior, Community of Our Lady of the Most Holy Rosary, Parañaque City (2023–2025)

Orders
- Ordination: June 8, 1996 by Benjamin Almoneda
- Consecration: May 1, 2025 by Rex Andrew Alarcon

Personal details
- Born: Herman Guinto Abcede; April 13, 1965 (age 61) Vinzons, Camarines Norte, Philippines
- Denomination: Roman Catholic
- Residence: Bishop’s Residence, Diocesan House, Diocesan Compound, Brgy. Gahonon, Daet, 4600 Camarines Norte
- Education: University of Santo Tomas; Don Bosco School of Theology; Pontifical Lateran University
- Motto: Rogate ergo Dominum messis (Latin for 'Pray to the Lord of the harvest') (Note: From Matthew 9:38)
- Coat of arms: Herman Guinto Abcede's coat of arms

Ordination history
History
Episcopal consecration
- Principal consecrator: Rex Andrew Alarcon
- Co-consecrators: Gilbert Garcera; Jesse Mercado

Styles of Herman G. Abcede
- Reference style: His Excellency; The Most Reverend
- Spoken style: Your Excellency
- Religious style: Bishop

Herman Guinto Abcede RCJ (born April 13, 1965) is a Filipino Catholic prelate serving as Bishop of Daet since 2025.

== Early life and education ==
Abcede was born in Vinzons, Camarines Norte, in the Diocese of Daet. He graduated high school at Vinzons Pilot High School and studied philosophy at the University of Santo Tomas in Manila, continued formation at the Rogationist Seminary of Manila, and later pursued theological studies at the Don Bosco School of Theology in Parañaque. He earned his licentiate in canon law from the Pontifical Lateran University in Rome.

== Priesthood ==
Abcede professed perpetual vows in 1991 and was ordained a priest on June 8, 1996.

Throughout his priestly ministry, Abcede held numerous pastoral, administrative, and academic roles within the Rogationists of the Heart of Jesus congregation. He began as a collaborator at Our Lady of the Most Holy Rosary in Parañaque from 1996 to 1997. He then served as assistant to the treasurer and counsellor at St. Anthony's Boys Village in Silang, Cavite. From 1997 to 2000, he worked as treasurer and director of spiritual affairs at the Rogationist Academy in Silang.

In 2000, he was appointed superior and held that role until 2003. In 2002, he also served as treasurer. During this period, he taught and acted as prefect of studies at the Blessed Hannibal Formation Center in Cebu. From 2003 to 2007, he was assigned as counsellor and secretary for the Philippine sector under the Indian Delegations of the Rogationists. In 2004, he served as counsellor at the Blessed Hannibal Rogate Center in Parañaque. He also took on pastoral leadership as administrator of St. Francis Xavier in Parang, Bataan from 2005 to 2007.

From 2007 to 2010, he was counsellor to the delegate for the Philippines. In 2007, he also served as treasurer and vice rector of the Rogationist College and house councillor at St. Anthony's Boys Village in Silang. He continued to lead various communities, serving as superior and treasurer of St. Anthony's Boys Village and as rector of the Rogationist Academy in Toril, Davao from 2008 to 2009, and once again in Silang from 2009 to 2010.

He was named major superior of the Rogationists' Philippine Quasi Province in 2010 and later became the first provincial superior of the newly erected St. Matthew Province, a role he held until 2018. Beyond his provincial leadership, he has been a member of the Association of Major Religious Superiors in the Philippines (AMRSP) and the Canon Law Society of the Philippines (CLSP).

He also served in the Matrimonial Tribunal of the Diocese of Parañaque as a defender of the bond since 2018, and was appointed as ecclesiastical judge of the same tribunal in 2021. Before his appointment as bishop, he has been the superior of the Community at Our Lady of the Most Holy Rosary, Parañaque City since 2023.

== Episcopal ministry ==
On March 4, 2025, Pope Francis named him as the new bishop of Daet, succeeding Rex Andrew Alarcon, who was transferred to the Archdiocese of Cáceres in 2024. He received episcopal consecration and took possession of the diocese on May 1, 2025, coinciding with the feast of Saint Joseph the Worker.

== See also ==
- Roman Catholic Diocese of Daet
- Ronald Timoner
- Rex Andrew Alarcon
- Gilbert Garcera

== Notes ==
Catholic Church titles
Preceded by Rex Andrew Alarcon	Bishop of Daet; May 1, 2025 – present	Incumbent
