= Gerard Francisco Timoner III =

Filipino Catholic priest and Dominican master (born 1968)

The Very Reverend Gerard Timoner III OP
- Master of the Order of Preachers
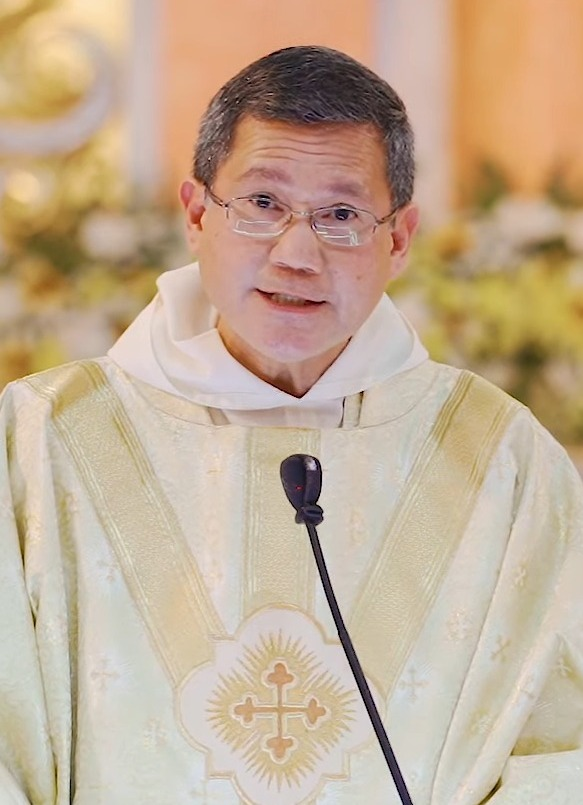
- Timoner in 2023
- Church: Latin Church
- Elected: 13 July 2019
- Predecessor: Bruno Cadoré
- Previous posts: Vice rector for Religious Affairs and Rector of the Central (Interdiocesan) Seminary at the University of Santo Tomas (2007–2012)

Orders
- Ordination: 14 May 1995

Personal details
- Denomination: Roman Catholic
- Born: Gerard Francisco Parco Timoner III; 26 January 1968 (age 58); Daet, Camarines Norte, Philippines
- Education: Philippine Dominican Center of International Studies; Catholic University of Nijmegen; University of Santo Tomas
- Relatives: Ronald Anthony Timoner (brother)

Gerard Francisco Parco Timoner III OP (born 26 January 1968) is a Filipino Catholic priest who has served as the 88th Master of the Order of Preachers, better known as the Dominicans, since 13 July 2019. He is the first Asian to hold the position.

Timoner is also a professor of theology at the University of Santo Tomas in Manila and since 2014 a member of the International Theological Commission.

== Early life and education ==
Gerard Francisco P. Timoner III was born on 26 January 1968 in Daet, Camarines Norte, Philippines to Francisco Timoner Jr. and Lilia Parco. He attended the Augustinian-administered La Consolacion College – Daet, graduating first honors from grade school in 1981, and as high school valedictorian in 1985. He obtained his licentiate in philosophy at the Philippine Dominican Center for International Studies in 1991 and a licentiate in theology at the University of Santo Tomas in 1994. He joined the Dominicans in 1985 and professed his vows in 1989. His brother, Ronald Anthony, is a bishop who, during his priesthood, served in the Diocese of Daet as its vicar general and diocesan administrator before being appointed as Bishop of Pagadian.

== Vocation ==
Timoner was ordained a priest in 1995. He earned additional degrees in sacred theology and intercultural theology at the Catholic University of Nijmegen in 2004.

On 23 September 2014, Pope Francis named him a member of the International Theological Commission. He is the fourth Filipino to have that distinction.

In December 2018, he was one of the leaders of a delegation of priests that searched the Dominican Mausoleum in Rome's Campo Verano cemetery for the remains of the first native-born Filipino ever consecrated a bishop, Jorge Barlin (born 1850–1909), who served as the Bishop of Nueva Caceres until his death in the city in 1909.

He was Prior Provincial of the Dominican Province of the Philippines and then Socius of the Master for Asia-Pacific before being elected Master of the Order on 13 July 2019. As the head of the Dominicans, he is also the ex officio Grand Chancellor of the Pontifical University of St. Thomas Aquinas.

== See also ==
- Ronald Anthony Timoner
- Diocese of Daet

Catholic Church titles
Preceded by Bruno Cadoré	Master of the Order of Preachers; 2019–present	Succeeded by Incumbent
