= Tinja, Tunisia =

Tinja (تينجة) Thimida
- Commune and town
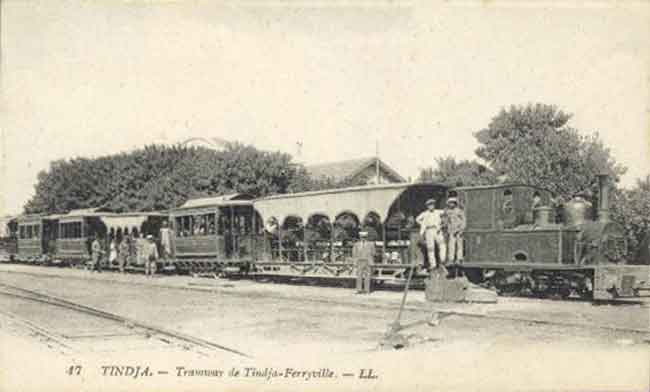
- Tinja, about 1900
- Interactive map of Tinja
- Country: Tunisia
- Governorate: Bizerte Governorate

Population (2014)
  - Total: 21,167
- Time zone: UTC+1 (CET)

Tinja or Tindja (تينجة) is a town and commune (municipality) in the Bizerte Governorate, in northern Tunisia, on the shores of Lake Ichkeul. Its name derives from that of the ancient Roman era city of Thimida, a former bishopric which remains a Latin Catholic titular see.

== Location and description ==
Tindja is located 37°09′37″N, 9°45′51″E and the mayor is Mohamed Ridha Mehedhbi. Like Menzel Bourguiba, which is four kilometers away, Tinja is located in the isthmus separating Lake Ichkeul and Lake Bizerte connected to the Mediterranean Sea. Its name comes from the Wadi Tinja which flows into the lake while a 5-kilometer canal blocked by an eponymous lock regulates the water exchange between the freshwater lake and the saltwater lagoon. Indeed, the lock open during the winter allows the exchanges between the two environments, in particular to maintain a sufficient degree of salinity of the waters of the lake to avoid the atrophy of the fauna and the flora. Fisheries are exploited at the canal level.

As of 2004 it had a population of 17,454.

Attached administratively to the Bizerte Governorate, it is the seat of a delegation and a municipality with 21,139 inhabitants in 2014.

A major industrial area is established and should benefit from the rehabilitation of the road linking Tinja to Menzel Bourguiba and then joining the Tunis-Bizerte (A4) motorway.

The area is a UNESCO Wetland of International Importance under the Ramsar Convention.

== History ==
Tindja was the capital of Hiempsal I, king of Numidia (died c. 117 BC), son of Micipsa and grandson of Masinissa, killed by the famous Jugurtha for the succession of the throne of Numidia.

Under Roman rule there was a town at Tinja. The ruins of Henchir-Tindja at Tinja have been identified with the Roman era civitas(town) of Thimida, which flourished from 330 BC to 640 AD. At this time, the town was the seat of an ancient Catholic diocese

A second Roman settlement called Gunela was located across the river, in what is today the southern suburbs of Tindja.

In the 12th century al Idrissi reports the city caught an abundance of fish from the lake. In the 18th century Dureau de la Malle reported that the townspeople take fish eggs of mullet. In 1896 France established a Naval base nearby resulting in European immigration. Within 20 years the population was three-quarters European.

== Titular see ==
The Ancient diocese was nominally restored in 1933 as a titular bishopric under the names Thimida (Latin) / Timida (Curiate Italian) / Thimiden(sis) (Latin adjective). It has had the following incumbents, so far of the fitting Episcopal (lowest) rank :

- Bienvenido Solon Tudtud (1968.02.05 – 1987.06.26) as Auxiliary Bishop of Dumaguete (Philippines) (1968.02.05 – 1971.02.17), later Bishop-Prelate of Territorial Prelature of Iligan (Philippines) (1971.02.17 – 1977.04.25), Bishop-Prelate of Marawi (Philippines) (1977.04.25 – death 1987.06.26)
- Benjamin J. Almoneda (1989.12.19 – 1991.06.07) as Auxiliary Bishop of Daet (Philippines) (1989.12.19 – 1991.06.07); later succeeded as Bishop of Daet (1991.06.07 – retired 2007.04.04)
- Patrick Taval, Sacred Heart Missionaries (M.S.C.) (1999.06.22 – 2007.12.06) as Auxiliary Bishop of Rabaul (Papua New Guinea) (1999.06.22 – 2007.12.06); later Coadjutor Bishop of Kerema (Papua New Guinea) (2007.12.06 – 2010.03.13), succeeding as Bishop of Kerema (2010.03.13 – death 2013.04.29)
- Victor Gnanapragasam, Missionary Oblates of Mary Immaculate (O.M.I.) (2010.04.29 – ...), as first Apostolic Vicar of Quetta (Pakistan); previously only Apostolic Prefect of Quetta (2001.11.09 – 2010.04.29).

== See also ==
- List of Catholic dioceses in Tunisia
- Thimida Regia, another former Roman city and bishopric, now also a Latin Catholic titular see
- List of cities in Tunisia
