= Ramon Arguelles =

Catholic bishop (born 1944)

The Most Reverend Ramón C. Argüelles D.D., S.T.L.
- Archbishop-Emeritus of Lipa
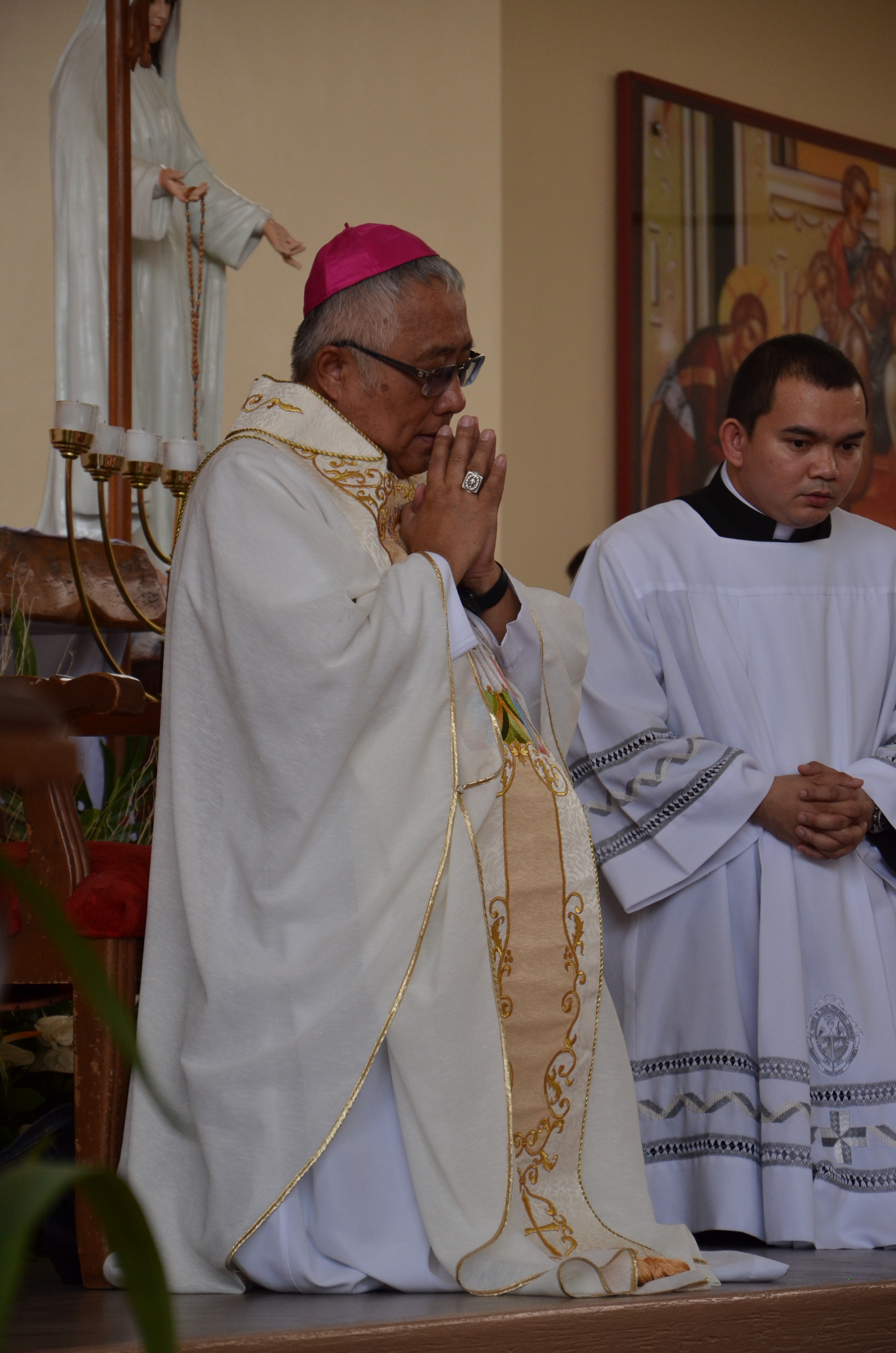
- Argüelles in 2016
- Church: Catholic Church
- See: Lipa (emeritus)
- Appointed: March 15, 2004
- Installed: July 16, 2004
- Retired: February 2, 2017
- Predecessor: Gaudencio Rosales
- Successor: Gilbert Garcera
- Previous posts: Priest, Archdiocese of Manila (1969–1993); Auxiliary Bishop of Manila (1994–1995); Bishop, Military Ordinariate of the Philippines (1995–2004)

Orders
- Ordination: December 21, 1969
- Consecration: January 6, 1994 by Pope John Paul II

Personal details
- Born: November 12, 1944 (age 82) Batangas, Batangas, Commonwealth of the Philippines
- Denomination: Roman Catholic
- Motto: Servus, ancillae filius ('I am Your servant, the son of Your handmaid', Wisdom 9:5)

Ordination history
History
Episcopal consecration
- Principal consecrator: Pope John Paul II
- Co-consecrators: Giovanni Battista Re; Josip Uhač
- Styles
- Reference style: The Most Reverend
- Spoken style: Your Excellency
- Religious style: Archbishop

Ramón Cabrera Argüelles, D.D., S.T.L. (born November 12, 1944) is a Filipino cleric who served as Archbishop of the Metropolitan Archdiocese of Lipa in the province of Batangas on the island of Luzon, Philippines from 2004 to 2017. Prior to his appointment as archbishop, he was an auxiliary bishop of the same diocese, appointed to that position on November 26, 1993.

Argüelles first appeared in the news for urging Filipinos to boycott Madonna's concert and for calling for prayers for President Ferdinand Marcos after the latter's burial at the Heroes' Cemetery was permitted by the Supreme Court. On April 21, 2017, Arguelles accepted his resignation as Archbishop of Lipa and installed Bishop of Daet Gilbert Garcera as his successor. The cleric is also known for his opposition of national issues such as divorce, the death penalty and the Reproductive Health Law.

== Biography ==
Arguelles attended Batangas South Elementary School from grades 1 to 4 (1951–1955) and St. Bridget's College from grade 5 to 2nd year high school (1955–1959). He finished 2nd to 5th year high school at Our Lady of Guadalupe Minor Seminary in Makati (1959–1963). He studied philosophy (1963–1966) and theology (1966–1970) at the San Carlos Seminary in Makati. During his childhood, he served as an altar boy.

Arguelles studied for the Bachelor of Sacred Theology and Licentiate in Sacred Theology at the Pontifical University of St. Thomas Aquinas (the Angelicum) in Rome (1972–1976) where he also studied sociology (1974–1976). He studied French at the Universite d'Ete in Paris, France (1973); German at the Goethe Institute, Passau, Germany (Summer 1976); Teresa de Avila at the Centre Spirituel, France (1981–1982); Tertianship at the Nemi Renewal Institute, Rome (July–December 1988); Poustinia at Madonna House, Comberemere, Ontario, Canada (December 1988-February 1989); and apostolic spirituality at St. Bueno's, North Wales (February–May 1989).

Arguelles was ordained a priest on December 21, 1969. Arguelles' priestly ministry began when he served as assistant parish priest at San Jose de Navotas in Navotas (1970–1972). He also served at these parishes in Germany: Hoxter 1 Luchtringen (1973–1974); Clemenskirche, Hannover (1975); and Grosskollnbach/Isar (1976). He then served as rector of San Carlos Seminary from 1982 to 1986.

Arguelles was also a prefect and acting pastor of the Guadalupe Minor Seminary (1977–1978). For three years, he was priest-in-charge of the Fil-Mission (Mission Society of the Philippines) Seminary in Tagaytay (1978–1981) where he was also professor of Introduction to the Scriptures. He served as rector of San Carlos Seminary in Makati (1982–1986) and professor of spirituality at the Summer Institute (1983–1985). He was parish priest and chaplain at the University of the Philippines Diliman in Quezon City (1986–1988) and then became parish priest of Our Lady of Mt. Carmel, Quezon City. On November 26, 1993, Pope John Paul II elevated him to the office of bishop, and appointed him titular Bishop of Roscrea.

Pope John Paul II appointed him an auxiliary bishop of Manila on November 27, 1993, and he was consecrated at St. Peter's Basilica in Rome. He also served as rector of the Colegio Filipino in Rome (1990–1994) and became chaplain of Filipinos in that country for two years (1990–1992). He was appointed head of the Military Ordinariate of the Philippines on August 25, 1995, and served until 2004. In 2004, he was named Archbishop of Lipa succeeding Gaudencio Rosales, who became Archbishop of Manila in 2003.

Since 1995, Arguelles has been chairman of the Catholic Bishops' Conference of the Philippines' Episcopal Commission on Migrants and Itinerant Peoples (ECMI). Since 1988 he has been spiritual director of the National Service Committee of the National Charismatic Renewal Movement.

== See also ==
- Our Lady Mediatrix of All Graces

Academic offices
Preceded by Gaudencio Rosales	Rector of San Carlos Seminary; 1980–1982	Succeeded by Francisco Mendoza de Leon
Preceded by Benjamin Almoneda	Rector of Pontificio Collegio Filippino; 1990–1994	Succeeded by Jesse Mercado
Catholic Church titles
Preceded by Pedro G. Magugat	Military Ordinary of the Philippines; August 25, 1995 – July 16, 2004	Succeeded by Leopoldo S. Tumulak
Preceded by Gaudencio Rosales	Archbishop of Lipa; July 16, 2004 – April 21, 2017	Succeeded by Gilbert Garcera
