= Rex Andrew Alarcon =

Filipino Roman Catholic Archbishop (born 1970)

His Excellency, The Most Reverend Rex Andrew Alarcon D.D.
- Metropolitan Archbishop of Nueva Cáceres
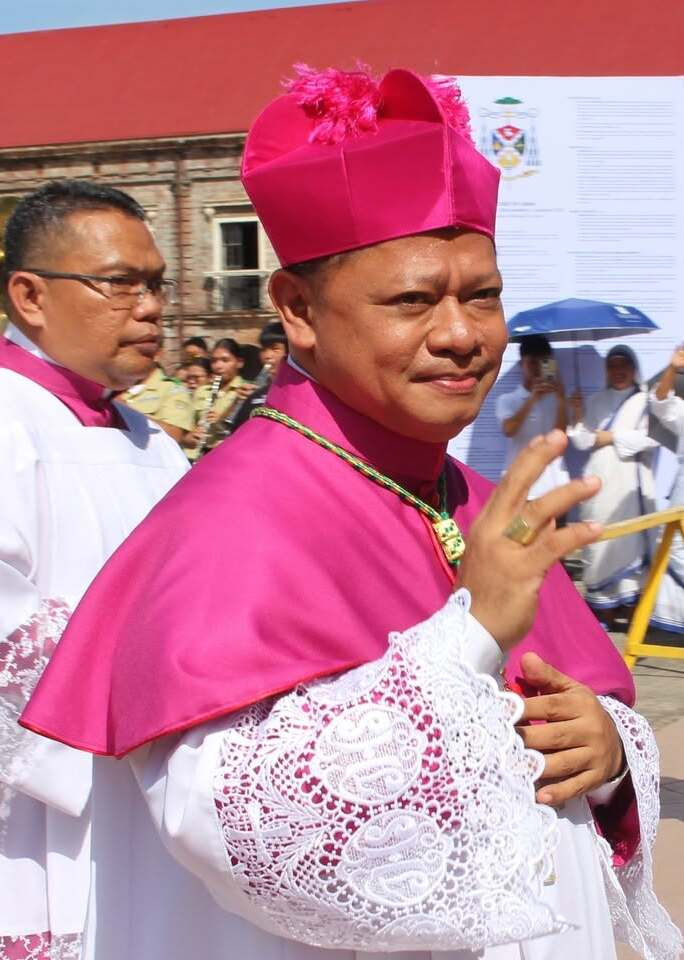
- Alarcon in 2024
- Appointed: February 22, 2024
- Installed: May 2, 2024
- Predecessor: Rolando J. Tria Tirona
- Other posts: Chairman, Episcopal Commission on Social Communications, CBCP (2025–present)
- Previous posts: Bishop of Daet (2019–2024); Chairman, Episcopal Commission on Youth, CBCP (2019–2025)

Orders
- Ordination: November 9, 1996 by Leonardo Z. Legaspi
- Consecration: March 19, 2019 by Rolando J. Tria Tirona

Personal details
- Born: August 6, 1970 (age 56) Daet, Camarines Norte, Philippines
- Residence: Archbishop's Palace, Naga, Camarines Sur
- Motto: Servus tuus sum (Latin for 'I am your servant') (Note: From Psalm 116:16)
- Coat of arms: Rex Andrew Alarcon's coat of arms

Ordination history
History
Diaconal ordination
- Ordained by: Jaime Cardinal Sin
Priestly ordination
- Ordained by: Leonardo Z. Legaspi
Episcopal consecration
- Principal consecrator: Rolando J. Tria Tirona
- Co-consecrators: Adolfo Tito Yllana; Manolo Alarcon de los Santos
Episcopal succession
Bishops consecrated by Rex Andrew Alarcon as principal consecrator
- Herman Abcede, RCJ: May 1, 2025

Styles of Rex Andrew Alarcon
- Reference style: His Excellency; The Most Reverend
- Spoken style: Your Excellency
- Religious style: Archbishop

Rex Andrew Clement Alarcon (born August 6, 1970) is a Filipino prelate of the Catholic Church. He is the fifth Metropolitan Archbishop of Cáceres, appointed by Pope Francis in 2024 to succeed Rolando Tria Tirona. Prior to his appointment, he served as Bishop of Daet from 2019 to 2024.

== Biography ==
Alarcon, born to Juanita C. Clement and Armando A. Alarcon on August 6, 1970 in Daet, Camarines Norte, finished his grade school studies at the Naga Parochial School. He then finished his high school education and philosophy degree at the Holy Rosary Minor Seminary. After being ordained to the priesthood on November 9, 1996, he attained his licentiate and master's degree in theology from the University of Santo Tomas.

After ordination, he served as parochial vicar at the St. John the Evangelist Metropolitan Cathedral and Parish in Naga City, and professor-formator at the Holy Rosary Minor Seminary until 1997.

From 1997 to 1999 he served as secretary to then-Archbishop Leonardo Z. Legaspi.

From 1999 and 2001 he studied at the Pontifical Gregorian University in Rome, Italy, where he obtained his licentiate in church history. Upon his return, he became a professor at the Holy Rosary Minor Seminary.

Since 2002 he has been the director of the Stewardship Program of the Archdiocese of Cáceres (SPARC). In 2007, he was appointed as the fourth director of his alma mater, the Naga Parochial School. Concurrently, he also served as president of the Catholic Educational Association of Cáceres and Libmanan, as well as the Bicol Association of Catholic Schools.

In 2013, Archbishop Rolando J. Tria Tirona appointed him superintendent of the Catholic schools of the archdiocese. He also served as a member of the College of Consultants, and spokesperson for the archdiocese. Since 2016 he has been chairman of the National Advocacy Commission of the Catholic Educational Association of the Philippines.

=== Bishop of Daet ===
After 22 years as a priest of the Archdiocese of Cáceres, on January 2, 2019, Pope Francis appointed him as the fourth bishop of the Diocese of Daet. He was the youngest bishop in the Philippines at the time of his appointment. He was ordained bishop on the Feast of Saint Joseph, March 19, 2019, at the Naga Metropolitan Cathedral, with Adolfo Tito Yllana, Apostolic Nuncio to Australia, and Manolo A. de los Santos, Bishop of Virac, as principal co-ordaining prelates. Apostolic Nuncio Gabriele Giordano Caccia represented the Holy See. Alarcon was installed a day later at the Cathedral of the Most Holy Trinity, and was attended by some 2,000 people.

In May 2019, he joined the second batch of Philippine bishops who went to Rome for an Ad Limina visit to Pope Francis.

=== Metropolitan Archbishop of Cáceres ===
On February 22, 2024, the Feast of the Chair of Saint Peter, Pope Francis appointed Alarcon as the fifth Archbishop of Cáceres, following Rolando Tirona's resignation almost two years after reaching the mandatory resignation age of 75. Alarcon was installed at the Naga Metropolitan Cathedral on May 2, 2024. He received the pallium — the symbol of his authority as metropolitan archbishop — from Pope Francis on June 29, the Solemnity of Saints Peter and Paul, in Rome. In line with Francis' revised policy in 2015 on the investiture of the pallia to be done in a separate ceremony in the archbishops' home dioceses, Archbishop Charles John Brown, the Apostolic Nuncio to the Philippines invested the pallium on Alarcon on September 21, 2024.

In June 2025, during the Jubilee Year of Hope, Alarcon and his archdiocese hosted the National Youth Day (NYD) 2025, a local replication of the World Youth Day. The event was originally scheduled for 2021, during the quincentennial commemorations of the arrival of Christianity in the Philippines, but was postponed due to the COVID-19 pandemic.

== Notes ==
Catholic Church titles
Preceded by Gilbert Garcera	Bishop of Daet; March 20, 2019 – May 1, 2024	Succeeded by Herman Abcede
Preceded by Rolando Tirona	Archbishop of Cáceres; May 2, 2024 – present	Incumbent
