= Benjamin Almoneda =

Filipino Roman Catholic Bishop (1930–2023)

The Most Reverend Benjamin Almoneda D.D., STL
- Bishop Emeritus of Daet
- Province: Caceres
- See: Daet
- Appointed: June 7, 1991
- Installed: September 1, 1991
- Retired: April 4, 2007
- Predecessor: Celestino Rojo Enverga
- Successor: Gilbert Armea Garcera
- Previous posts: Auxiliary Bishop of Daet and Titular Bishop of Thimida (1989–1991)

Orders
- Ordination: March 22, 1958
- Consecration: January 6, 1990 by Pope John Paul II

Personal details
- Born: Benjamin de Jesus Almoneda; April 11, 1930 Naga, Camarines Sur, Philippine Islands
- Died: January 6, 2023 (aged 92) Manila, Philippines
- Denomination: Roman Catholic
- Motto: De Spiritu Sancto Ex Maria Virgine "[Conceived] by the Holy Spirit, born of the Virgin Mary" (Nicene Creed)
- Coat of arms

Styles of Benjamin Almoneda
- Reference style: His Excellency; The Most Reverend
- Spoken style: Your Excellency
- Religious style: Bishop

Benjamin de Jesus Almoneda (April 11, 1930 – January 6, 2023) was a Filipino bishop of the Roman Catholic Church who served as the second bishop of the Diocese of Daet from 1991 to 2007. He also served as the first auxiliary bishop of the same diocese before becoming its ordinary.

== Early life and education ==
Almoneda was born in Naga, Camarines Sur on April 11, 1930. He studied at Central School in Naga from 1937 to 1941. In 1943, he entered the Holy Rosary Minor Seminary and continued his education at Ateneo de Naga from 1946 to 1950, earning a Bachelor of Arts degree.

From 1950 to 1958, he studied theology at San Jose Seminary in Quezon City. He then went on to earn a Licentiate in Sacred Theology, specializing in Pastoral Theology, from the Pontifical Lateran University in Rome from 1960 to 1962. He also took courses in catechetic at Lumen Vitae in Brussels, Belgium.

== Priesthood ==
Almoneda was ordained to the priesthood on March 22, 1958, at the Naga Cathedral in Naga City. After his further studies, he served as Spiritual Director of Holy Rosary Minor Seminary from 1963 to 1966, then as Rector of the same seminary from 1966 to 1970. From 1970 to 1972, he was assigned Pastor of Concepcion Parish in Naga.

He served the Catholic Bishops' Conference of the Philippines (CBCP) as Executive Secretary of Episcopal Commission on Education and Religious Instruction (ECERI) from 1972 to 1973 and again from 1976 to 1977. He served as Secretary General of CBCP from 1974 to 1975. From 1978 to 1980, he became Rector of the Shrine of St. Francis of Assisi in Naga. He later served as Pastor in Saint Anthony of Padua Parish in Iriga City from 1980 to 1982.

He was appointed Rector of Collegio Filippino in Rome from 1982 to 1990.

== Episcopal Ministry ==
On December 19, 1989, Pope John Paul II appointed him as auxiliary bishop of Daet and titular bishop of Thimida. He was consecrated bishop on January 6, 1989, at St. Peter's Basilica by Pope John Paul II himself.

He succeeded Bishop Celestino R. Enverga as Bishop of Daet on June 7, 1991, and was installed on September 1, 1991. He served the diocese until Pope Benedict XVI accepted his retirement on April 4, 2007, upon reaching the canonical retirement age of 75, and was succeeded by Bishop Gilbert Garcera.

After his retirement he still continued his ministry in seminary formation. He was appointed by then Cardinal Gaudencio Rosales as Spiritual Director of the Redemptoris Mater Missionary Seminary of Manila.

== Death ==
Bishop Almoneda died on January 6, 2023, in Manila, Philippines, at the age of 92.

Catholic Church titles
| Preceded by Celestino Rojo Enverga | Bishop of Daet; September 1, 1991 – April 4, 2007 | Succeeded by Gilbert Armea Garcera |
| Preceded by Bienvenido Solon Tudtud | — TITULAR — Bishop of Thimida; January 6, 1990 – June 7, 1991 | Succeeded by Patrick Taval |
