= Bruno Cadoré =

The Reverend Bruno Cadoré OP
- Master of the Order of Preachers
- Church: Catholic Church
- Predecessor: Carlos Azpiroz Costa
- Successor: Gerard Timoner III

Orders
- Ordination: 28 September 1986

Personal details
- Born: 14 April 1954 (age 72) Le Creusot, Burgundy, France
- Denomination: Roman Catholic
- Occupation: Medical Doctor

Bruno Cadoré OP (born 14 April 1954) is a French Catholic priest of the Dominican Order who served as the religious order's Master from 2010 to 2019.

Cadoré trained as a physician, specialising in the field of bioethics.

== Biography ==
Bruno Cadoré was born at Le Creusot, France, in 1954. After qualifying as a medical doctor Cadoré entered the Dominican novitiate in 1979. Professing his vows in 1980, he was ordained a priest in 1986, and received a doctorate in moral theology from the University of Fribourg in 1992. Prior to his election as Master of the Order, Cadoré served as Prior Provincial of the Dominican Province of France. Previously he was director of the Medical Ethics Center of the Université Catholique de Lille.

Cadoré was elected to a nine-year term as the 87th Master of the Order of Preachers at the General Chapter of the Order in Rome, on 5 September 2010, and thereby ex officio Grand Chancellor of the Pontifical University of St. Thomas Aquinas, Angelicum. During his term of office as Master of the Order, Cadoré was chancellor of the Colegio de San Juan de Letran and the University of Santo Tomas in Manila, Philippines. Upon completion of his nine-year mandate, he was succeeded by Gerard Timoner. He is the author of With Him: Listening to the Underside of the World (Bloomsbury Continuum 2019).

== See also ==
- Catholic Church in France

Catholic Church titles
Preceded by Carlos Azpiroz Costa	Master of the Order of Preachers; 2010–2019	Succeeded by Gerard Timoner
