= Archbishop of Lipa =

- Archbishopric

catholic
- Incumbent: Gilbert Armea Garcera

Location
- Country: Philippines
- Ecclesiastical province: Lipa

Information
- Established: Bishopric in 1910; Archbishopric in 1972
- Archdiocese: Archdiocese of Lipa
- Cathedral: Metropolitan Cathedral of San Sebastian

Website
- Archbishop of Lipa

The Roman Catholic Archbishop of Lipa is the head of the Roman Catholic Archdiocese of Lipa and the Metropolitan Bishop of the suffragan dioceses of Boac, Gumaca, Lucena and the Prelature of Infanta.

Gilbert Garcera is the incumbent archbishop of Lipa since 2017.

== History ==
When the original Diocese of Lipa was created on April 10, 1910, the Bishop of Lipa had authority over a very vast region of a mostly homogenous Tagalog population. The Bishop used to oversee the Roman Catholics in the provinces of Batangas, Laguna, Tayabas (now Quezon, including the present-day Aurora), Marinduque and Mindoro.

In 1936, the first territorial re-organisation of the Roman Catholic Archdiocese of Lipa was promulgated with the creation of the Apostolic Prelature of Calapan, thus separating the province of Mindoro from the Archdiocese. This was followed by the creation of the Diocese of Lucena and the Prelature of Infanta in 1950.

Another re-organisation happened in 1967 when the province of Laguna was raised to the rank of a diocese under the titular Diocese of San Pablo. The Diocese of Boac in Marinduque was created in 1977 and that of Gumaca in 1984. Both dioceses were part of the Diocese of Lucena before their establishment. In 1983 the new Apostolic Vicariate of San Jose in Occidental Mindoro was created.

Today, the Archdiocese of Lipa is for the province of Batangas alone. But the population has multiplied many times over. The archdiocese is divided into 6 vicariates, each headed by a vicar forane. Except for the parishes in Vicariate IV, which are run by the Oblates of St. Joseph, all other parishes are run by the diocesan clergy. There are 49 parishes in all, served by 143 priests; 122 of them diocesan. There are 13 religious brothers, and 197 religious sisters. Catholic schools number 23, high school seminaries 2 and college seminaries 3. Two pastoral centers are being maintained.

== Past and Present Prelates of Lipa ==
No.	Incumbent	Tenure		Notes
No.	Incumbent	From	Until	Notes
1	Giuseppe Petrelli †	Apr 12, 1910 Appointed	Mar 30, 1915	Appointed as the first Bishop of the Archdiocese of Lipa; later appointed as official to the Roman Curia
2	Alfredo Florentin Verzosa †	06 Sept 1916	Feb 25, 1951	Retired from office
3	Alejandro Ayson Olalia †	Dec 28, 1953	Jan 2, 1973	Elevated to the rank of Archbishop when Lipa became an Archdiocese on 20 June 1972; died in office
4	Ricardo Jamin Vidal †	Aug 22, 1973	Apr 13, 1981	Later appointed as the Archbishop of Cebu
5	Mariano Garcés Gaviola †	Apr 13, 1981	Dec 30, 1992	Retired from office
6	Gaudencio Borbon Rosales	Dec 30, 1992	Sept 15, 2003	Later appointed as the Archbishop of Manila
7	Ramon Cabrera Arguelles	Jul 16, 2004	Apr 21, 2017	Retired from office
8	Gilbert Armea Garcera	Apr 21, 2017	Present	Former Bishop of Daet; later appointed as the Fifth Archbishop of Lipa and Eighth Local Ordinary
