= Pedro Paulo Santos =

The Most Reverend Pedro Paulo S. Santos
- Archbishop of Caceres
- Province: Camarines Sur
- See: Caceres
- Installed: September 16, 1938
- Term ended: April 6, 1965 (Died)
- Predecessor: Most Rev. Francisco Sales Alicante Reyes, D.D.
- Successor: Most Rev. Teopisto Valderrama Alberto, D.D.

Orders
- Ordination: March 15, 1913
- Consecration: August 15, 1938 by Guglielmo Piani, SDB

Personal details
- Born: June 29, 1889 Porac, Captaincy General of the Philippines
- Died: April 6, 1965 (aged 75) Naga, Camarines Sur, Philippines
- Denomination: Catholic
- Residence: Naga City
- Motto: Cor Jesu in te Confido (lit. 'Sacred Heart of Jesus, I trust in Thee.')
- Coat of arms

Styles of Pedro Paulo Santos
- Reference style: The Most Reverend
- Spoken style: Your Excellency
- Religious style: Archbishop

Pedro Paulo Songco Santos (June 29, 1889 – April 6, 1965) was a Filipino prelate of the Roman Catholic Church in the Philippines. He was best known for his tenures as the 31st bishop and later elevated as the first archbishop of Caceres.

== Early life and education ==
Santos was born in Porac, Pampanga on June 29, 1889. At age 11, he enrolled at the Ateneo de Manila in June 1900. Four years later, he was accepted at the Central Seminary of Saint Francis Xavier.

== Career ==
On March 15, 1913, he was ordained priest by Archbishop Jeremias Harty, at the age of 24. He was immediately assigned as Assistant Priest and at the same time as sub-secretary to the Archbishop of Manila.

Just a few months into his job, he secured his first parochial assignment in his own province as Assistant Priest of Mexico, Pampanga in October. In November 1914, he was appointed chaplain of the chaplaincy of barrio Calulut, San Fernando, Pampanga. There, he undertook the construction of a church enabling the chaplaincy to become a parish. He then assumed the post as its first parish priest.

On July 9, 1917, he was assigned to Bacolor by the Michael O’Doherty, Archbishop of Manila. It was in this town that he set up the first of the schools he would organize later in his life: St. Mary's Academy, founded in 1922. The high school closed in 1925 when a branch of St. Scholastica's College opened in San Fernando, but the elementary level operation continued, interrupted only by the war. During his long tenure in Bacolor, he also repaired the church and constructed a rectory.

In September 1932 Santos was assigned to the parish of Angeles. He established catechetical centers in Angeles barrios and encouraged the practice of spiritual retreats. He fostered the growth of the Solidarity of the Children of Mary and published “Ing Cuyug”, (The Echo), a missionary newsletter that he circulated to thousands of subscribers. He organized fund-raising programs for the restoration of the old convent occupied by the Benedictine Sisters, the Holy Family Academy, founded in 1910 by Augustinian Sisters. In 1933 he also co-founded Holy Angel College (with Juan Nepomuceno), later to become a university, the biggest in Central Luzon. Santos was appointed Vicar Forane of the northeast district of the province.

== As bishop of Caceres and the elevation as archdiocese ==
On May 21, 1938, Santos was named Bishop of Nueva Caceres (Naga) by Pope Pius XI. He was consecrated at the Manila Cathedral on August 15 by the Apostolic Delegate, Msgr. Guillermo Piani. On September 16, 1938, he was installed in his Diocesan See. He was named as Archbishop of Caceres in 1951.

In 1956 he went back to San Fernando to lead the canonical coronation of the Virgen de los Remedios, the holy image that became the guiding light of the Cruzada de Caridad y Bena Voluntad. He died in 1965, aged 75.

Catholic Church titles
Preceded by Francisco Sales Alicante Reyes, D.D.	Archbishop of Caceres; 1938 to 1965	Succeeded by Teopisto Valderrama Alberto, D.D.
Academic offices
