= Gilbert Garcera =

Filipino Roman Catholic Archbishop (born 1959)

His Excellency, The Most Reverend Gilbert Armea Garcera D.D.
- Metropolitan Archbishop of Lipa
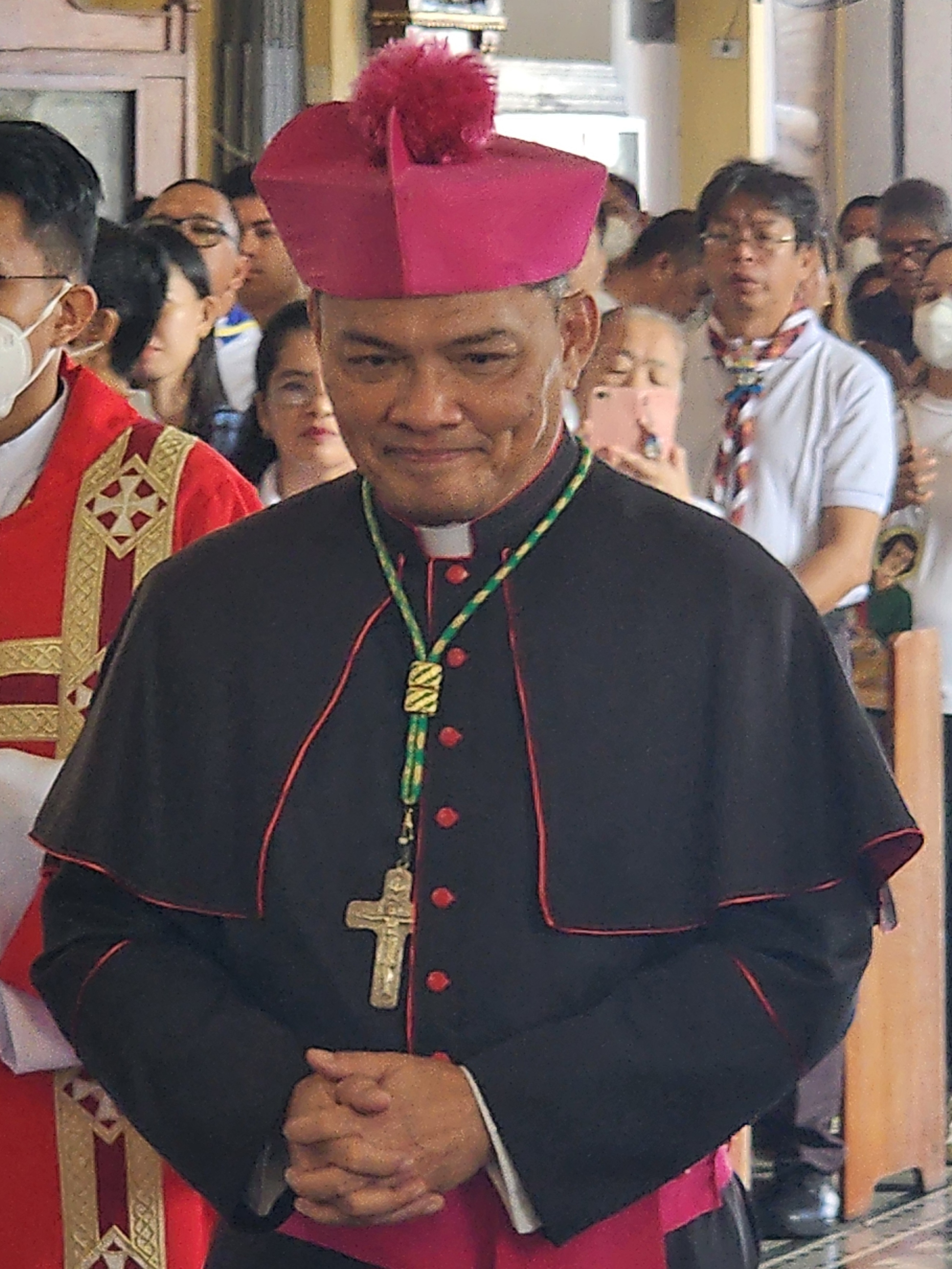
- Garcera in 2024
- Archdiocese: Lipa
- Appointed: February 2, 2017
- Installed: April 21, 2017
- Predecessor: Ramon Arguelles
- Other posts: President, CBCP (2025–present)
- Previous posts: Priest, Archdiocese of Cáceres (1983–2007); Bishop of Daet (2007–2017); Chairman, CBCP Episcopal Commission on Family and Life (2017–2021)

Orders
- Ordination: May 29, 1983 by Teopisto Valderrama Alberto
- Consecration: June 29, 2007 by Leonardo Legaspi

Personal details
- Born: February 2, 1959 (age 67) Magarao, Camarines Sur, Philippines
- Denomination: Roman Catholic
- Education: Holy Rosary Major Seminary
- Motto: Ad omnia mittam te (Latin for 'To wherever I will send you, you will be going') (Note: From Jeremiah 1:17)
- Coat of arms: Gilbert Armea Garcera's coat of arms

Ordination history
History
Priestly ordination
- Ordained by: Teopisto Valderrama Alberto
Episcopal consecration
- Principal consecrator: Leonardo Legaspi
- Co-consecrators: Benjamin Almoneda; Orlando Quevedo
Episcopal succession
Bishops consecrated by Gilbert Garcera as principal consecrator
- Edwin Panergo: December 01, 2025

Styles of Gilbert A. Garcera
- Reference style: His Excellency; The Most Reverend
- Spoken style: Your Excellency
- Religious style: Archbishop, Monsignor

Gilbert Armea Garcera (born February 2, 1959) is a Filipino Catholic prelate. He has been the metropolitan archbishop of Lipa since 2017, and president of the Catholic Bishops' Conference of the Philippines since 2025. His previous assignment was as the bishop of the Diocese of Daet in Camarines Norte.

== Biography ==
Gilbert Armea Garcera was born in Magarao, Camarines Sur, to Celestino Borja Garcera and Nenita Romero Armea. He finished his elementary education in 1971 at Naga Parochial School, Naga City and his secondary education in 1975 at Holy Rosary Minor Seminary in Naga City. He continued his studies at Holy Rosary Minor Seminary where he completed a Bachelor of Philosophy in 1979 and a Bachelor of Sacred Theology in 1983 at the Holy Rosary Major Seminary. The same year, on May 29, he was ordained a priest for the Archdiocese of Cáceres.

He received his master's degree in Religious Studies from the Ateneo de Manila University, Quezon City, in 1992, with the thesis "A Proposed Basic Catechetical Formation Program for the Deaf."

In 2004, he completed his Doctor of Philosophy in Organization Development (OD) at the Southeast Asia Interdisciplinary Development Institute (SAIDI), Antipolo, with his dissertation "An OD Intervention in Evolving the Desired Organizational Culture of the Episcopal Commissions of the Catholic Bishop’s Conference of the Philippines (CBCP)."

=== Presbyterate ===
Garcera's first assignment after his presbyteral ordination was as the assistant parish priest at the Metropolitan Cathedral of Saint John the Evangelist in Naga City, then vice rector of the Basilica Minore of Our Lady of Penafrancia from 1991 to 1992. He was assigned as rector of San Francisco Parish in Naga City in 1997, where he became the parish priest after a year.

He was assigned in several ministerial and pastoral duties in the Archdiocese of Caceres. He was appointed the Archdiocesan Director of Caceres Catechetical Ministry from 1987 to 1995. He became a member of the Presbyteral Council of Caceres from 1985 to 1998 and the Commission on Communications from 1988 to 1991. He was elected in the Board of Trustees of Naga Parochial School, Naga City from 1995 to 2001.

From 1992 to 1995, he became the administrative director / personnel officer in Radio Veritas Asia, then from 2001 to 2003, he was appointed as the assistant secretary general and assistant treasurer of the Catholic Bishops' Conference of the Philippines and managing editor of CBCP Monitor. He was a member of the Catechism for Filipino Catholics (CFC) Speakers' Bureau of the Episcopal Commission on Catechesis and Catholic Education (ECCCE) from January 2003 up to the present.

He became the national director, ad interim of the Pontifical Missionary Societies of the Philippines in Manila and executive secretary, ad interim of the Episcopal Commission on Mission of the Catholic Bishops’ Conference of the Philippines from 2002 to 2003.

He was appointed as the national director of the Pontifical Missionary Societies of the Philippines in Manila, member of the Superior Council and member of the Asian Delegate for the Restricted Council of Pontifical Missionary Societies from 2004 up to the present.

He was chosen to chair the Congress Program Committee for the Asian Mission Congress in Thailand from January to October 2006, and became a member of the Supreme Committee of Pontifical Missionary Societies, Rome from 2005 to 2010.

=== Bishop of Daet ===
On April 4, 2007, he was appointed third bishop of Daet by Pope Benedict XVI after the resignation of his predecessor, Benjamin J. Almoneda, was approved. He was ordained bishop on June 29, 2007, at the Basilica Minore of Our Lady of Peñafrancia, Naga City by Leonardo Z. Legaspi, Metropolitan Archbishop of Caceres, together with Benjamin J. Almoneda, Bishop Emeritus of Daet, and Orlando Quevedo, Archbishop of Cotabato.

In October 2015, Garcera was among the six Filipinos out of the 270 cardinals and bishops and 18 couples from the world allowed by Pope Francis to attend the historic Synod of Bishops on the Family at the Vatican. He chaired the CBCP Episcopal Commission on Family and Life from 2017 to 2021 and was a member of the CBCP Permanent Council.

=== Archbishop of Lipa ===
On February 2, 2017, Pope Francis accepted the resignation of Ramon Arguelles, who had led the archdiocese for 13 years, and appointed Garcera as his successor. On April 21, he was installed as the archdiocese's sixth archbishop. He and fellow archbishop Martin Jumoad of Ozamis received the pallium — the symbol of their authority as metropolitan archbishop — from Pope Francis on June 29, 2017, the Solemnity of Saints Peter and Paul, in Rome. In line with Francis' revised policy in 2015 on the investiture of the pallia to take place in a separate ceremony in the archbishops' home dioceses, Archbishop Gabriele Giordano Caccia, the Apostolic Nuncio to the Philippines, invested the pallium on Garcera on January 17, 2018.

At the 130th plenary assembly of the CBCP in Anda, Bohol, Garcera was elected as its president on July 5, 2025, succeeding Pablo Virgilio David. He assumed his position on December 1. His election broke tradition of electing the CBCP vice president (Mylo Hubert Vergara at the time) to succeed as president.

== Notes ==
Catholic Church titles
| Preceded by Benjamin Almoneda | Bishop of Daet; June 30, 2007 – February 2, 2017 | Succeeded by Rex Andrew Alarcon |
| Preceded by Ramon Arguelles | Archbishop of Lipa; April 21, 2017 – present | Incumbent |
| Preceded by Pablo Virgilio David | CBCP president December 1, 2025 – present | Incumbent |
