= Naga Cathedral =

Roman Catholic cathedral in Naga City, Philippines

The Naga Metropolitan Cathedral
- Metropolitan Cathedral and Parish of Saint John the Evangelist
- Kalakhang Katedral at Parokya ni San Juan Evangelista (Filipino); Catedral Metropolitana y Parroquia de San Juan Evangelista (Spanish)
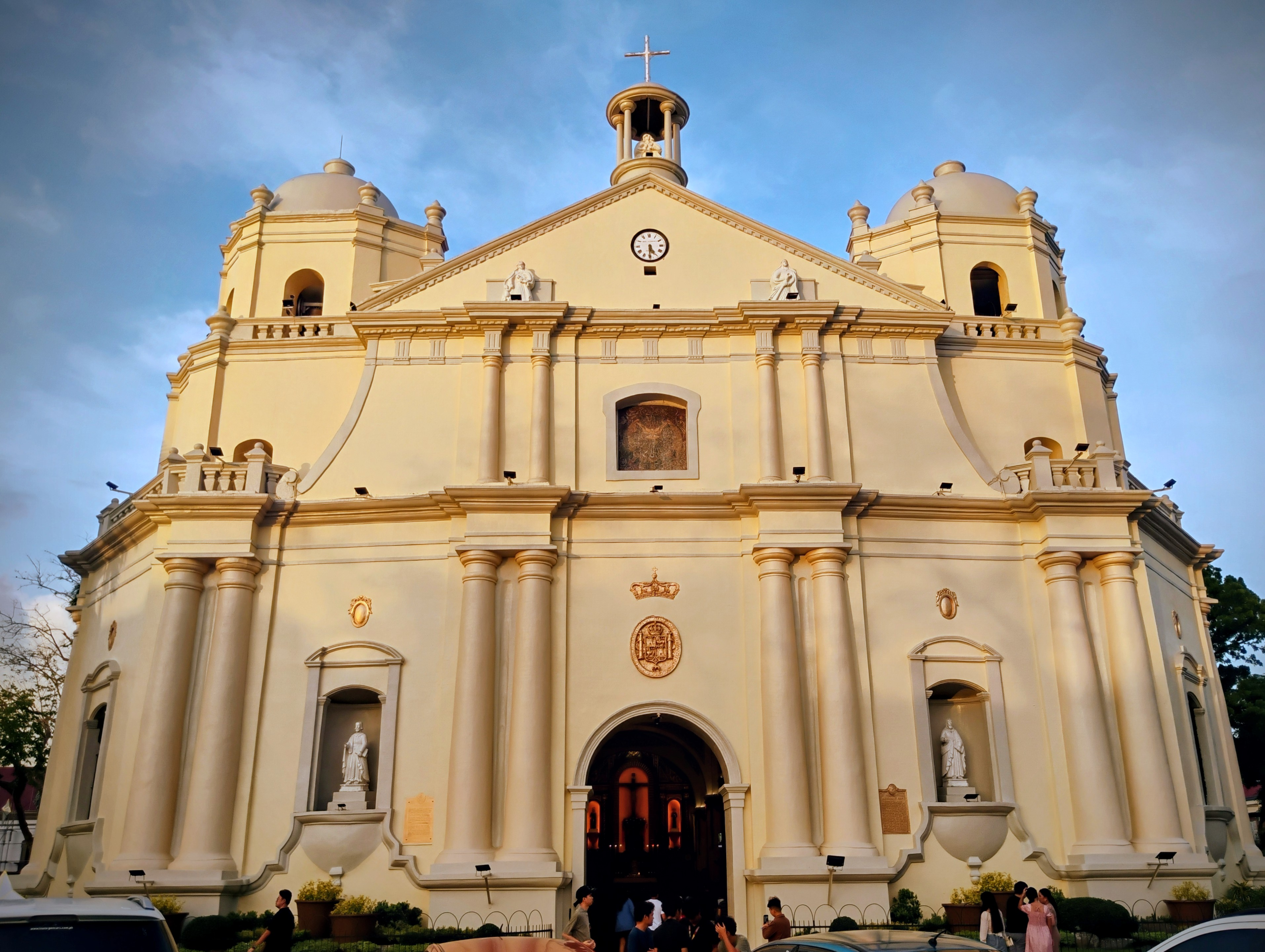
- Cathedral facade in 2025

- Location in Luzon Location in the Philippines
- 13°37′42″N 123°11′14″E
- Location: Naga, Camarines Sur
- Country: Philippines
- Denomination: Roman Catholic

History
- Status: Cathedral
- Dedication: John the Evangelist
- Dedicated: February 6, 1988; 38 years ago (restoration)
- Earlier dedication: April 27, 1843; 183 years ago

Architecture
- Functional status: Active
- Architect: Bernardo dela Concepción
- Architectural type: Church building
- Style: Earthquake Baroque-Romanesque
- Groundbreaking: 1808; 218 years ago
- Completed: 1843; 183 years ago

Specifications
- Capacity: 1,450 sitting, 2,300 standing
- Materials: Coral, bricks, cement

Administration
- Province: Cáceres
- Metropolis: Cáceres
- Archdiocese: Cáceres
- Parish: St. John the Evangelist

Clergy
- Archbishop: Rex Andrew Alarcon
- Rector: Domingo R. Florida
- Vicar(s): Michael Angelo C. Escriba; Leoneil Arce B. Belen

The Metropolitan Cathedral and Parish of Saint John the Evangelist, also known as The Naga Metropolitan Cathedral, is a Roman Catholic cathedral in Naga, Camarines Sur, Philippines. It is the seat of the Archdiocese of Cáceres. The first church was established after the creation of the archdiocese as the Diocese of Nueva Cáceres in 1595. The present cathedral was built in 1808, and was completed and consecrated in 1843.

Rex Andrew Alarcon is the present Archbishop of Cáceres, and Domingo R. Florida is the current rector and parish priest of The Naga Metropolitan Cathedral.

== History ==
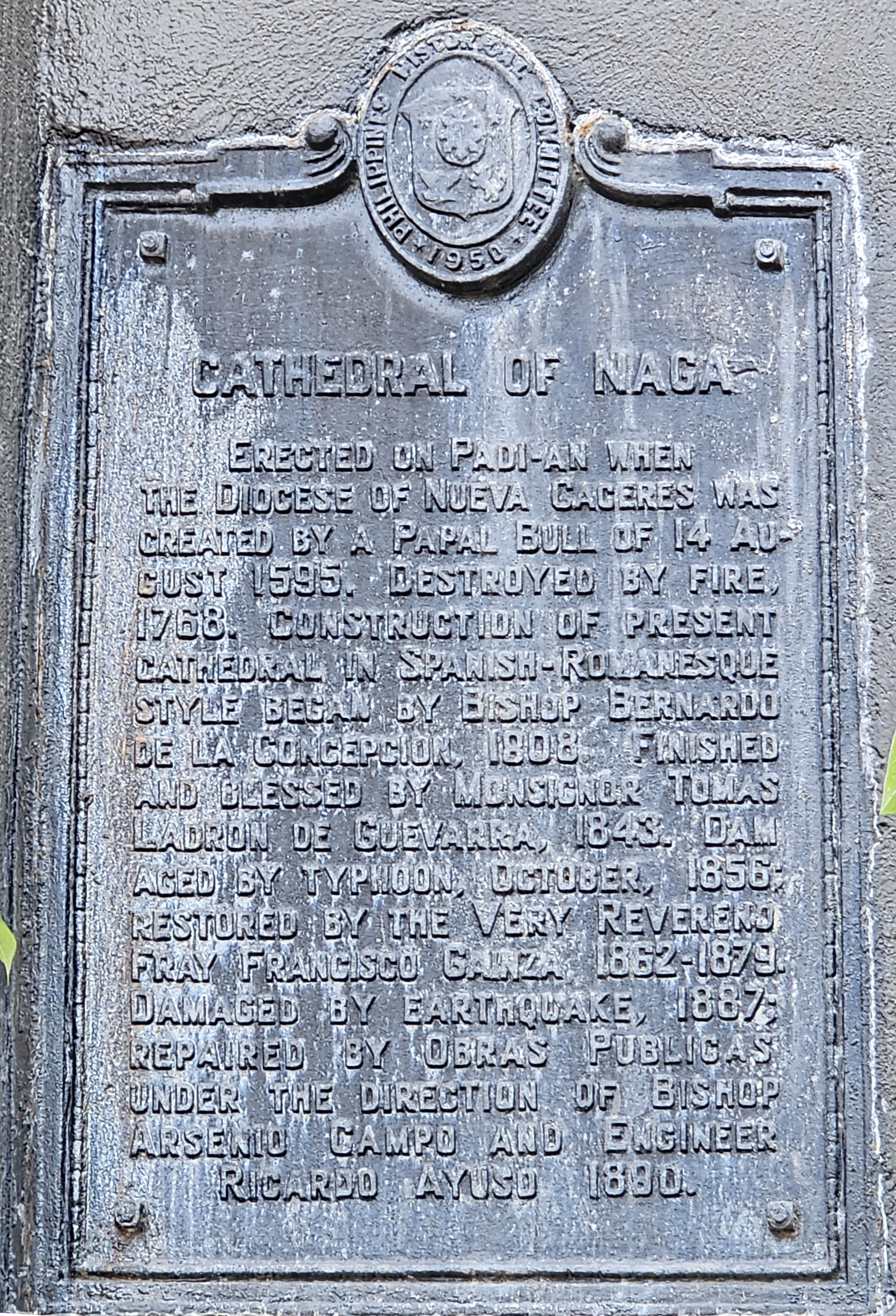
Church PHC historical marker installed in 1950

The first cathedral built for Naga was founded after the Diocese of Cáceres was established in 1595. It is a suffragan of the Diocese of Manila created by papal bull of August 14, 1595, which also elevated the Diocese of Manila into an archdiocese. The church was destroyed by fire in 1768.

The construction of the present cathedral in Spanish Romanesque Revival style was begun by Bishop Bernardo de la Concepción in 1808. An earthquake in 1820 damaged the cathedral. It was finished and consecrated under the administration of Tomás Ladrón de Guevara in 1843. It was damaged by a typhoon in October 1856, and restored by Francisco Gainza in 1862–1879. It was damaged by an earthquake in 1887, and repaired by Obras Publicas under the direction of Bishop Arsenio del Campo and Ricardo Ayuso in 1890.

During the episcopate of Leonardo Legaspi, the cathedral was restored beginning in April 1987 under the supervision of Jaime M. San Andres, parish priest of the Saint John the Evangelist Parish, Naga. On February 6, 1988, during the feast of Saint Pedro Bautista, titular patron of the archdiocese, the metropolitan cathedral was again inaugurated and rededicated by Archbishop Legaspi together with other Bicolano bishops and priests.

== Architecture and design ==
The church presently has a generally cruciform plan and is Romanesque in ornamentation. It is a large stone construction with gabled galvanized iron sheets for roofing, the walls outside has a grey color. Above the crossing is a rectangular dome topped by a cupola.

The front façade has a high arch entrance with two-level, twin pilasters flanking both sides. It has a gentle curvature on both front corners to create the illusion of a softened façade. The façade is topped by a pediment surmounted by a round cupola, with its roof supported by tiny columns. The pediment is flanked by two short, symmetric hexagonal belfries on both ends. The front façade has an overall squat look typical of Earthquake Baroque architecture. The front façade also holds the coat of arms of Castile and León.

Inside the cathedral are arcades to counter the effects of earthquakes that damaged the cathedral in 1820; above the nave and both left and right aisles are supported by four massive series of arches and columns. Each of the massive interior columns, arches, including the ceilings are decorated by trompe-l'œil paintings that were recently done. Both sides have stained glass windows.

== Gallery ==
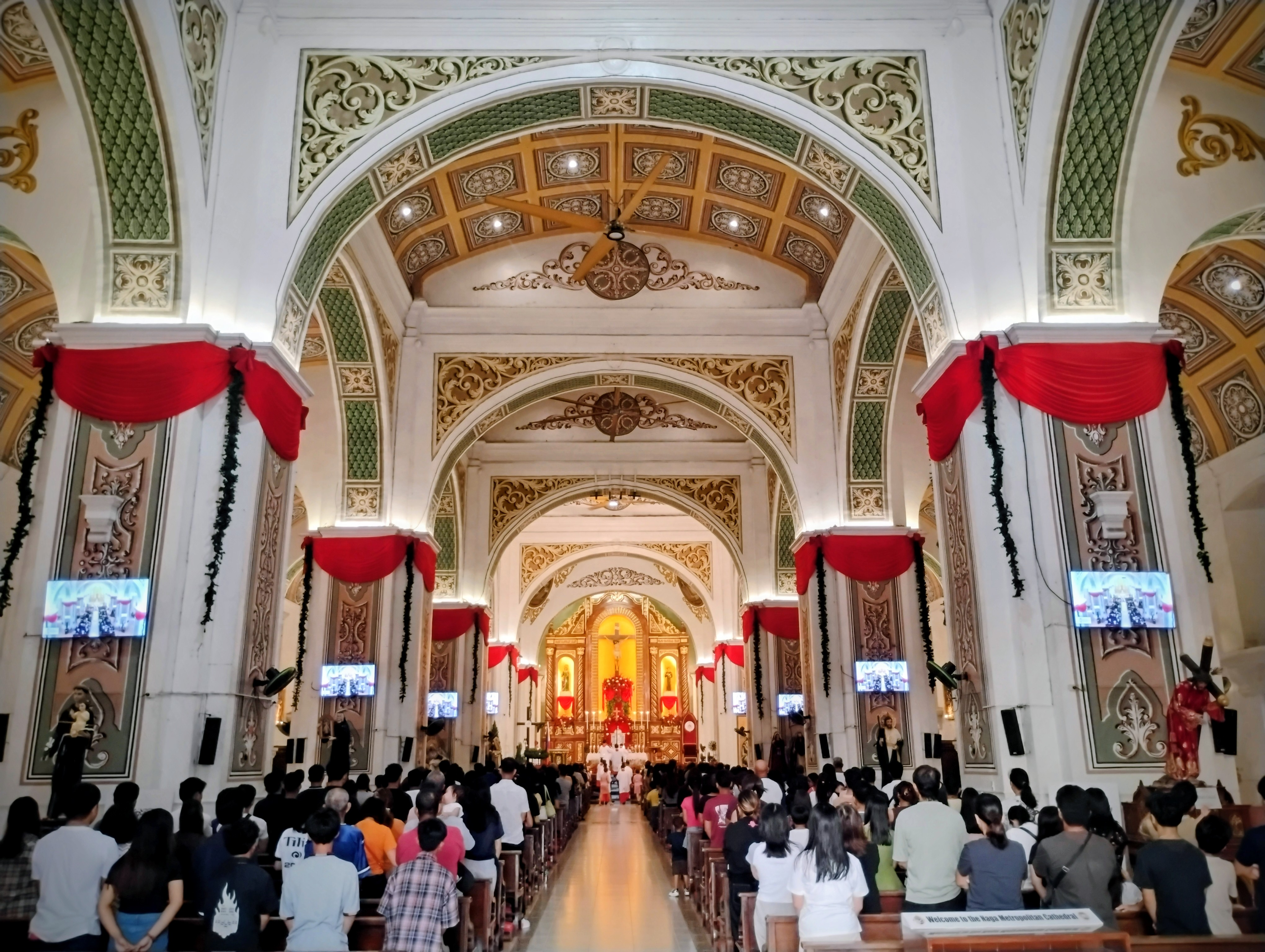
Interior of the cathedral

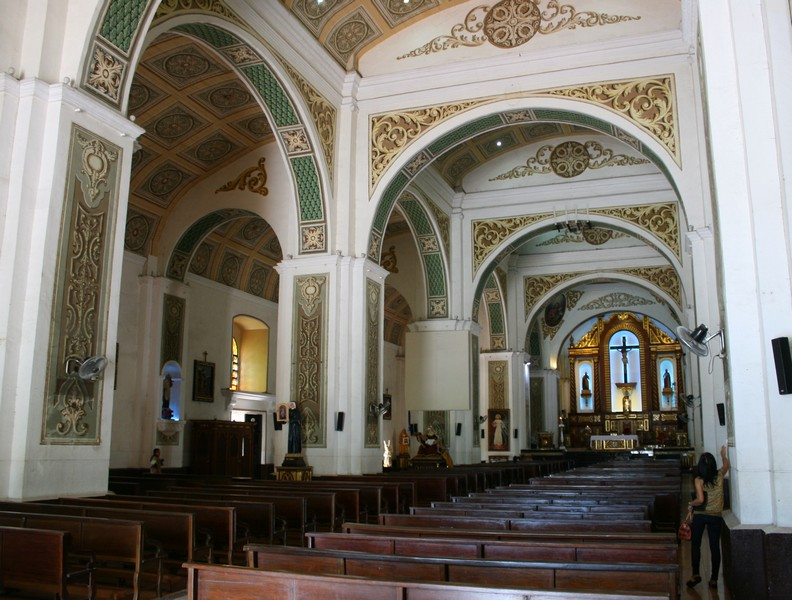
The massive arcades and columns inside the cathedral, designed to counter the effects of earthquakes

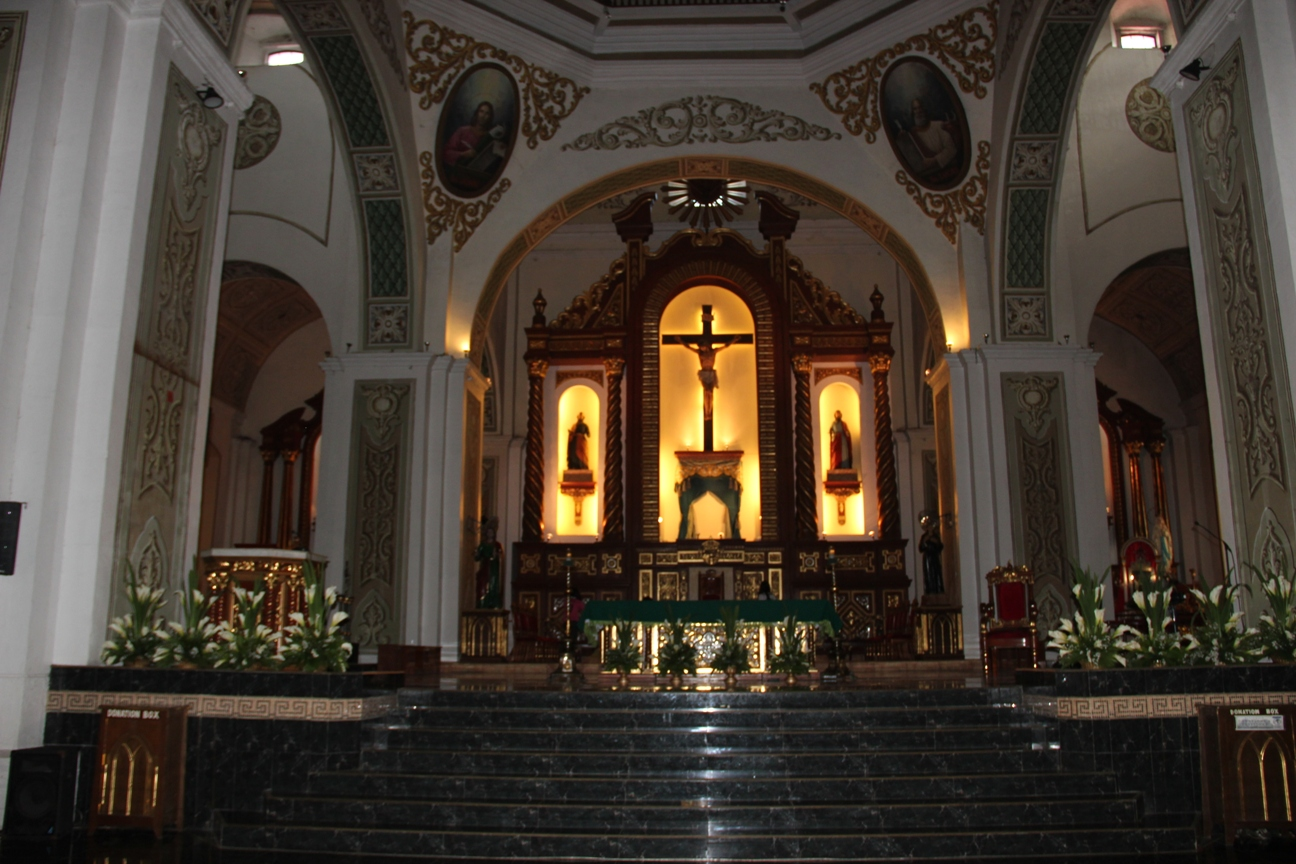
The main altar and reredos of the cathedral
