= Leonardo Legaspi =

Filipino archbishop

The Most Reverend Leonardo Z. Legaspi OP, D.D., S.Th.D, Ph.D.
- Archbishop of Caceres
- Province: Camarines Sur
- See: Caceres
- Installed: January 18, 1984
- Term ended: November 14, 2012
- Predecessor: Teopisto Valderrama Alberto
- Successor: Rolando Joven Tria Tirona
- Other post: Auxiliary Bishop of Manila

Orders
- Ordination: December 17, 1960
- Consecration: August 8, 1977 by Bruno Torpigliani

Personal details
- Born: 25 November 1935 Meycauayan, Bulacan, Commonwealth of the Philippines
- Died: 8 August 2014 (aged 78) Manila, Philippines
- Denomination: Roman Catholic
- Education: University of Hong Kong; University of Santo Tomas
- Motto: Illuminare Omnes (lit. 'A Light to All')
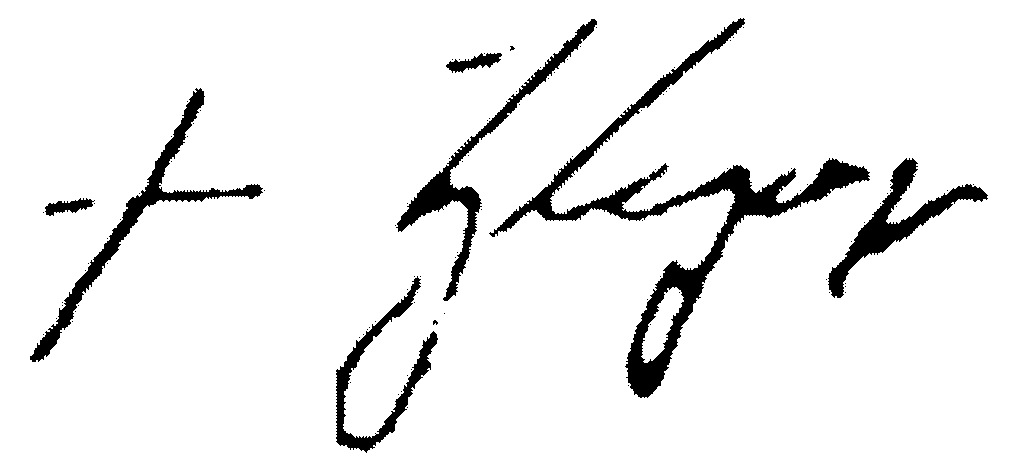
- Signature: Leonardo Z. Legaspi's signature

- Coat of arms: Leonardo Z. Legaspi's coat of arms

Styles of Leonardo Z. Legaspi, OP
- Reference style: The Most Reverend
- Spoken style: Your Excellency
- Religious style: Archbishop

Ordination history of Leonardo Legaspi
History
Episcopal consecration
- Consecrated by: Bruno Torpigliani
Episcopal succession
Bishops consecrated by Leonardo Legaspi as principal consecrator
- Bishop Gilbert Garcera: June 29, 2007

Leonardo Zamora Legaspi, OP (25 November 1935 – 8 August 2014) was a Filipino prelate of the Roman Catholic Church in the Philippines. He was best known for his tenure as the third archbishop of Caceres from 1984 to 2012 and being the first Filipino appointed as Rector Magnificus of the University of Santo Tomas in 1970.

Legaspi's episcopal ministry began in 1977 when he was appointed as auxiliary bishop of Manila and as titular bishop of Elefantaria in Mauritania. He also served as president of the Catholic Bishops Conference of the Philippines from 1988 to 1991.

== Early life and education ==
Legaspi was born in Meycauayan, Bulacan on 25 November 1935. After his high School education at St. Mary's Academy in Meycauayan, he went to the University of Hong Kong where he obtained an A.B. degree in Philosophy in 1955.

In 1960, he joined the Dominican Order, and in the following year he received a Licentiate of Sacred Theology (S.T.L.) from the University of Santo Tomas in 1962, and subsequently a S.T.D. degree the same year. After receiving his B.S. degree in Educational Management at the Harvard Graduate School of Business Administration in 1971, he again studied at the University of Santo Tomas and earned his Ph.D. degree in 1975.

== Career ==
In 1968, he served as the first Filipino Rector Magnificus of the University of Santo Tomas's Central Seminary, and in 1970, he was appointed the first Filipino Rector Magnificus of the University of Santo Tomas. On 30 June 1977, he was designated as Titular Bishop of Elefantaria in Mauritania and Auxiliary Bishop of Manila.

Later, he was installed in Solemn Ceremonies as the 33rd Bishop and third Archbishop of the Caceres at the Metropolitan Cathedral of Saint John the Evangelist, Naga City, on 18 January 1984. In 1987, he openly gave sermons that denounced the violence committed by members of the New People's Army, the armed wing of the Communist Party of the Philippines, and was assigned bodyguards in late December after receiving death threats. He served as the president of the Catholic Bishops Conference of the Philippines from 1988 to 1991 and president of the Second Plenary Council of the Philippines in 1991.

== Retirement and Death ==
On 8 September 2012, Pope Benedict XVI accepted his retirement as archbishop of Caceres, and named Bishop Rolando Joven Tria Tirona, OCD, as archbishop-elect. Tirona, who until then had been the bishop-prelate of the Roman Catholic Territorial Prelature of Infanta in the Philippines, immediately succeeded to the see upon accpeting his appointment and was formally installed as archbishop of Caceres on 14 November 2012.

On his 37th episcopal anniversary and Feast of Saint Dominic, 8 August 2014, Legaspi died at age 78 on 5:00 a.m. at the University of Santo Tomas Hospital of lung cancer.

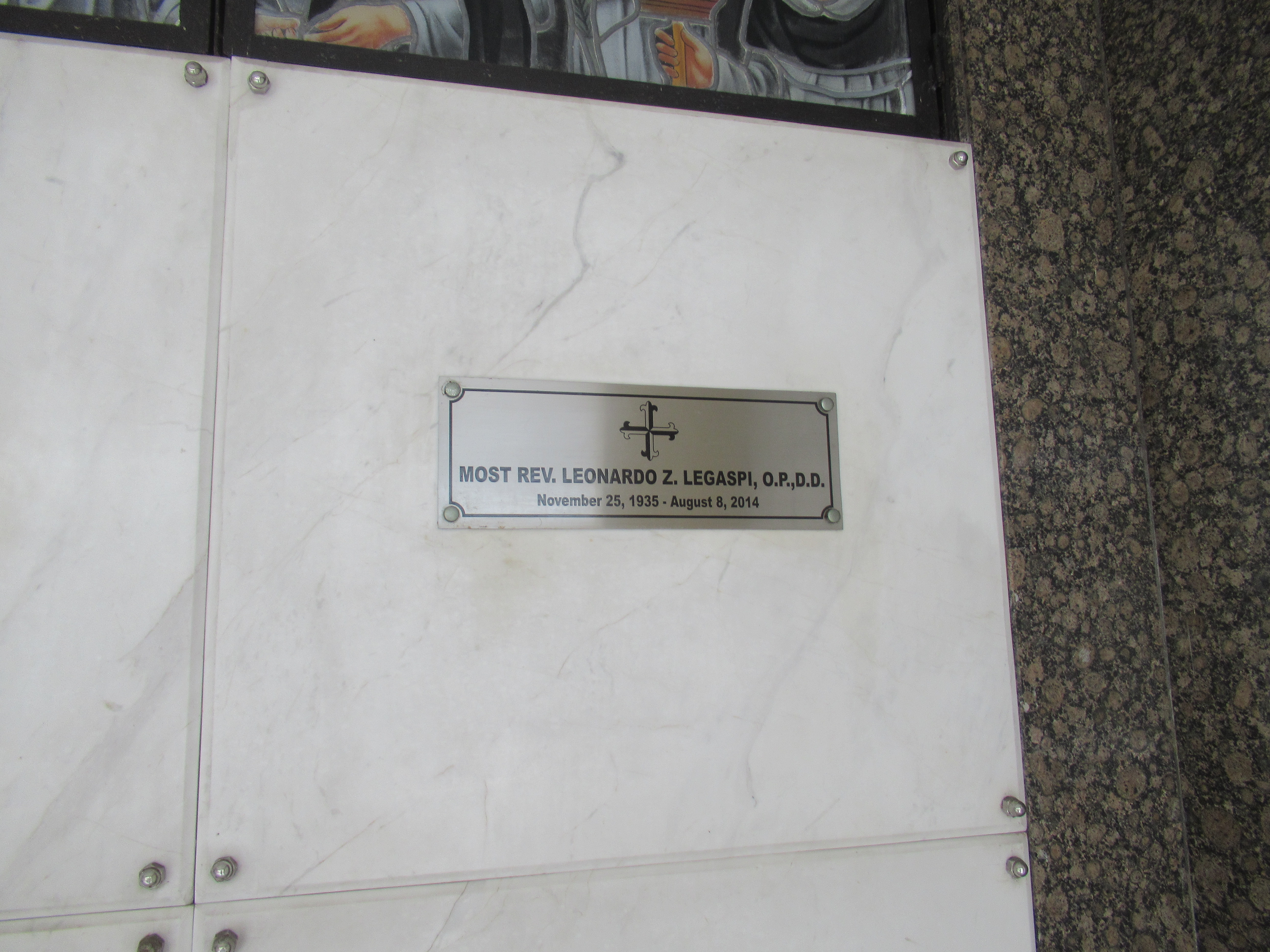
Santuario de Santo Domingo Columbarium Leonardo Legaspi tomb

== Honors and awards ==
- Ten Outstanding Young Men of the Philippines Award for Education (1974)
- Grand Cross, Order of Alfonso X the Wise (1974)
- Tanglaw Awards (1974)
- Kyung Hee University's Highest (Golden) Award (1974)
- Rizal Pro Patria Award (1975)
- International Association of University Presidents Award (1976)

== Honorary degrees ==
- Doctor of Education Honoris Causa, National University, Manila
- Doctor of Laws Honoris Causa, Angeles University, Pampanga
- Doctor of Humanities, University of Northeastern Philippines

Religious titles
Preceded by Teopisto Valderrama Alberto	Archbishop of Caceres; 1984 to 2012	Succeeded by Rolando Joven Tria Tirona, OCD
Preceded by Ricardo Vidal	CBCP President; 1987–1991	Succeeded by Carmelo Dominador Flores Morelos
Academic offices
Preceded by Fr. Jesús Diaz, OP	Rector Magnificus of the University of Santo Tomas; 1971–1977	Succeeded by Fr. Frederik Fermin, OP
