= Diocese of Daet =

Latin Catholic diocese in Camarines Norte, the Philippines

Coordinates: 14.1242°N 122.9484°E

Diocese of Daet Dioecesis Daëtiensis: Diyosesis ng Daet; Diócesis de Daet

Catholic
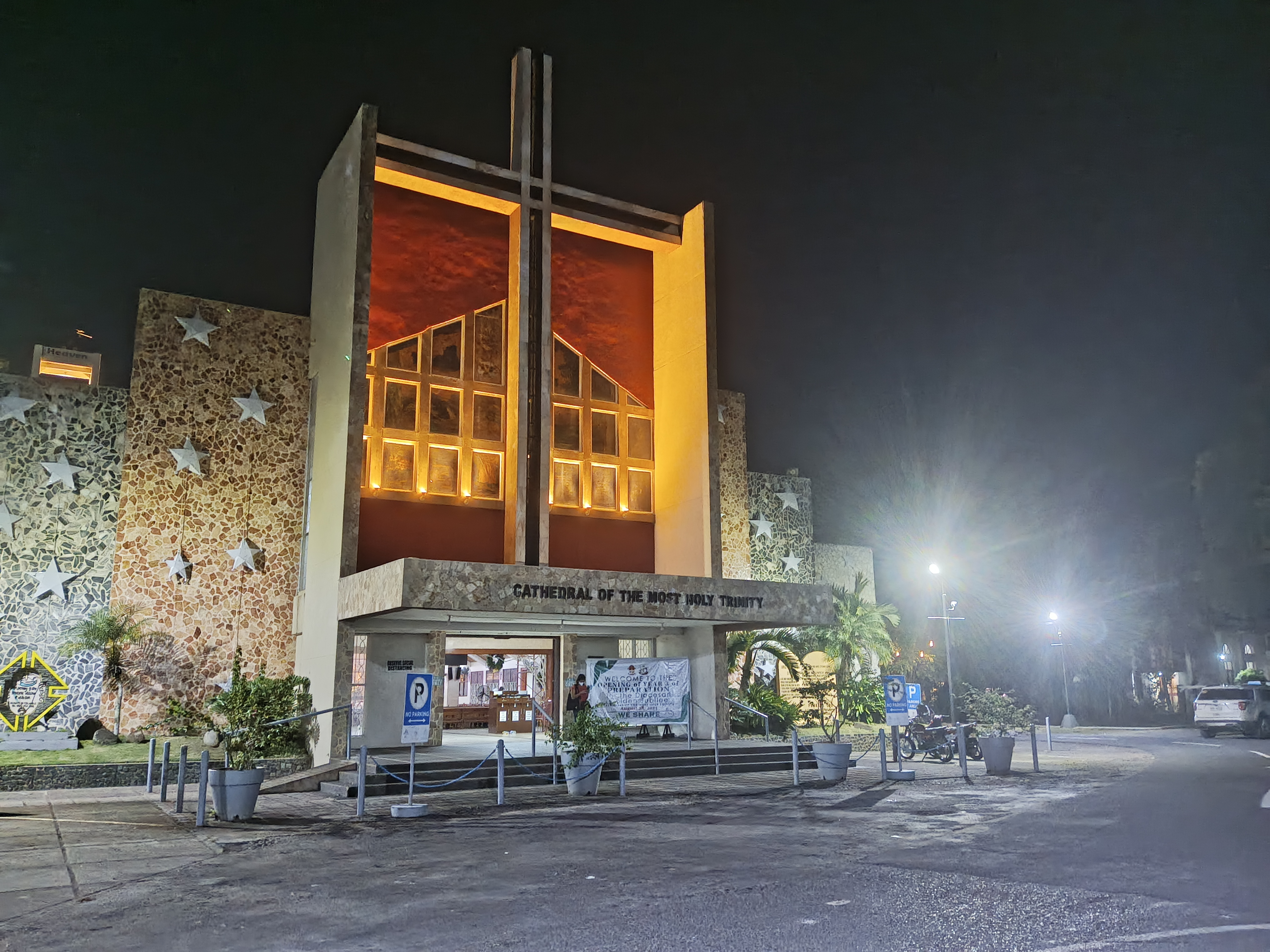
- Daet Cathedral façade at night

- Coat of arms

Location
- Country: Philippines
- Territory: Camarines Norte
- Ecclesiastical province: Caceres
- Metropolitan: Caceres

Statistics
- Area: 2,200 km^{2} (850 sq mi)
- Population: Total; Catholics: (as of 2021); 637,000; 578,000 (90.7%)
- Parishes: 30 (27 full-pledged parishes, 3 quasi-parishes)
- Schools: 11

Information
- Denomination: Catholic
- Sui iuris church: Latin Church
- Rite: Roman Rite
- Established: May 27, 1974; 52 years ago (canonically erected on September 1, 1974)
- Cathedral: Cathedral of the Most Holy Trinity
- Patron saint: St. Joseph the Worker; Our Lady of Candelaria

Current leadership
- Pope: Leo XIV
- Bishop: Herman Abcede
- Metropolitan Archbishop: Rex Andrew Alarcon
- Bishops emeritus: Benjamin Almoneda Auxiliary Bishop Emeritus (1989-2007)

Map
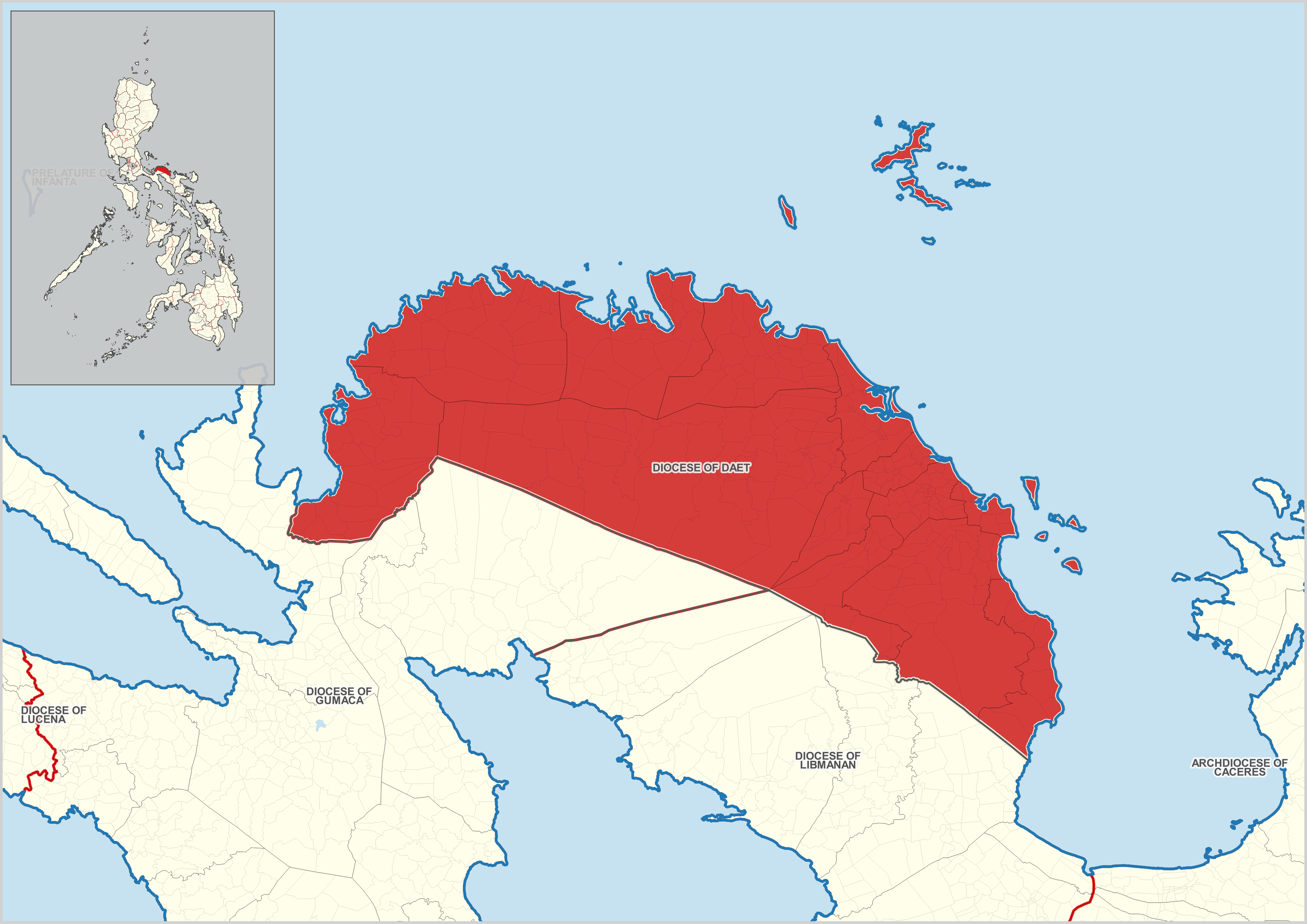

Website
- https://dioceseofdaet.org (archived)

The Diocese of Daet (Latin: Dioecesis Daëtiensis) is a Latin Catholic diocese of the Catholic Church in the Philippines. It is named after its episcopal see, Daet, a town in the province of Camarines Norte in the Philippines.

The Diocese of Daet, with jurisdiction over the Province of Camarines Norte and suffragan to the Archdiocese of Caceres, was created on May 27, 1974, by Pope Paul VI, with Celestino R. Enverga as the first bishop of the diocese.

== History ==
On September 1, 1974, the Diocese of Daet was formally established along with the installation of its first bishop, Celestino Rojo Enverga, a native of Jose Panganiban, Camarines Norte. The Diocese of Daet was entrusted to the care of St. Joseph the Worker.

Through the apostolic constitution “Requirit Maximopere”, Pope Paul VI separated Daet from the Archdiocese of Caceres, thereby creating Daet as a new diocese which became a suffragan of the Archdiocese of Caceres.

Since the Augustinian missionaries Diego de Espinar and Francisco Merino had established Christian communities in Paracale in 1571, it took 393 years for Camarines Norte, the land of gold and pineapple, to be erected as a diocese.

Ordained in 1706, Don Gregorio Cabalquinto from the town of Paracale was the first Bicolano priest.

The history of the diocese can be divided into three periods. The first period spans from 1974 to 1984.

According to Bishop Celestino Enverga, two years after the canonical erection in 1974, there was a diocesan house complex, a charity clinic, and a haven for homeless people discharged from hospitals. After four years the Most Holy Trinity Cathedral was set up. There was a public library; a diocesan museum, a printing press, and statues,

The first decade of the diocese gave birth to three parishes: the Parish of St. Roche, Batobalani on May 31, 1976; the Parish of San Lorenzo Ruiz on July 2, 1983; and the Parish of St. Nicholas of Tolentino, Colasi on July 23, 1983.

The first decade was characterized by construction of structures: the first phase of the diocesan house was completed in 1977 and the Holy Trinity Cathedral was ready for its dedication by September 1, 1984.

The second period runs from 1985 to 1994, starting with the foundation by Enverga of the Religious Order of Kolbean Sisters.

On October 16, 1990, the Diocese of Daet became a vacant see (sede vacante) because of death of Enverga. Bishop Almoneda, then the auxiliary bishop of the Diocese of Daet, became the diocesan administrator, and on July 6, 1991, he became the second Bishop of the Diocese of Daet.

Celestino Enverga died in 1990 and Bishop Benjamin J. Almoneda was appointed as the second bishop of Daet in 1991

The nine barangays from the Diocese of Gumaca were annexed to the Parish of Sta. Elena; the Parish of the Most Holy Trinity was established in 1991, the vision-mission statement of the diocese was formulated in 1991; the Holy Trinity Preparatory Seminary, the first seminary in the diocese, was opened in 1992, the first Diocesan Pastoral Assembly was held in 1992; the Bishop Enverga and the Carillon Halls were inaugurated in 1993; and the Second General Pastoral Assembly was convened in 1994.

Almoneda prioritized catechesis among his pastoral program. Three years after he took office, the Mater Vitae Catechetical Center was inaugurated in 1994.

In the second decade of the diocese the focus shifted from structures to evangelization, reaching its apex in the First Diocesan Synod of Daet.

In the decade from 1995 to 2004 the First Diocesan Synod of Daet was held.

New parishes were set up: the Parishes of St. James the Great of Calabaca, Capalonga, Our Lady of Good Voyage of Calaguas, St. Philip of San Felipe of Basud, Holy Family of Talobatib, Our Lady of All Nations of Tabugon, the Chaplaincy of St. Roch of Tabas, the Quasi Parish of the Divine Mercy and the Parish of San Lorenzo, the Deacon. SPACFI was inaugurated in this period.

To accommodate the increasing number of priestly vocations, in 1997 Almoneda started the Holy Trinity College Seminary project; construction of the seminary compound started in 1999, and took about six years.

Bishop Nestor Carino was appointed auxiliary bishop of Daet in 2003.

After parish consultations from 2001 to 2002, the Synodal sessions were held from 2002 to 2003. The decrees of the synod were promulgated in January 2004, a common pastoral direction of the diocese was defined, and the pastoral program for the next five years defined.

From fourteen parishes and three vicariates in 1974 the diocese grew to 24 canonically erected parishes, 5 quasi-parishes plus one chaplaincy and five vicariates, with concomitant personnel increases.

In December 2004 the Pearl Jubilee Celebration started by launching the MSK in Labo; on April 11, 2005, on the occasion of the 75th birthday of Almoneda, the Our Lady of Gudalupe Chapel was dedicated; in May 2005 the diocesan catechetical day was celebrated; on May 28, the Pearl Jubilee Santacruzan was held.

The 3rd bishop of Daet was Gilbert A. Garcera, who left to become archbishop of Lipa on February 2, 2017. On January 2, 2019, the Vatican announced that Pope Francis appointed Rex Andrew C. Alarcon as the new bishop of the diocese. February 22, 2024, Pope Francis appointed Alarcon as archbishop of Nueva Caceres. On March 4, 2025, Pope Francis appointed Herman G. Abcede as the 5th bishop of the diocese.

== Ordinaries ==
=== Bishops ===
Bishop			Period in office	Notes	Coat of arms
1		Celestino Rojo Enverga	September 1, 1974 – October 16, 1990 (16 years, 45 days)	Died in office	
2		Benjamin de Jesus Almoneda	September 1, 1991 – April 4, 2007 (15 years, 215 days)	Retired	
3		Gilbert Armea Garcera	June 30, 2007 – February 2, 2017 (9 years, 217 days)	Appointed archbishop of Lipa	
4	Most Rev. Rex Andrew Alarcon, DD	Rex Andrew Clement Alarcon	March 20, 2019 – February 22, 2024 (4 years, 339 days)	Appointed archbishop of Caceres	
5		Herman Guinto Abcede, R.C.J.	May 1, 2025 – present (1 year, 143 days)		

=== Auxiliary bishops ===
Bishop		Period in office	Titular see	Notes	Coat of arms
1	Benjamin de Jesus Almoneda	January 6, 1990 – June 7, 1991 (1 year, 152 days)	Thimida	Appointed bishop of Daet	
2	Nestor Celestial Cariño	June 11, 2003 – April 1, 2005 (1 year, 294 days)	Acholla	Appointed bishop of Legazpi	

== Priests of this diocese who became bishops ==
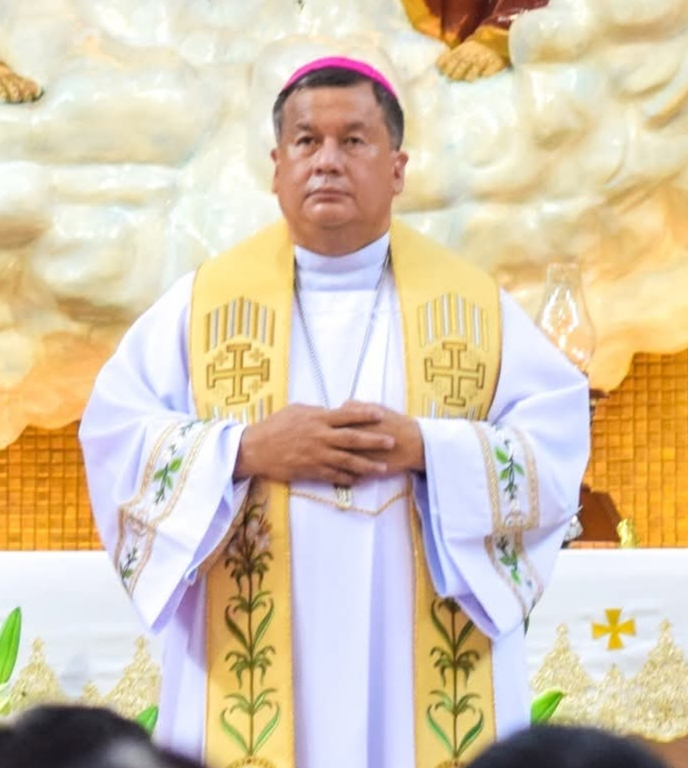
Most Rev. Ronald Anthony Timoner during the installation of Rev. Fr. Herman G. Abcede, RCJ on May 1, 2025 as the bishop of Daet

- Ronald Anthony Timoner – former diocesan administrator and vicar general, later became the sixth bishop of Pagadian (2025–present)

== See also ==
- Catholic Church in the Philippines
