= Archdiocese of Cáceres =

Latin Catholic archdiocese in the Philippines

Coordinates: 13.6280°N 123.1870°E

Metropolitan Archdiocese of Nueva Cáceres Archidiœcesis Metropolitæ Cacerensis Arkidiosesis Metropolitano kan Cáceres Kalakhang Arkidiyosesis ng Cáceres Arquidiócesis Metropolitano de Cáceres

Catholic
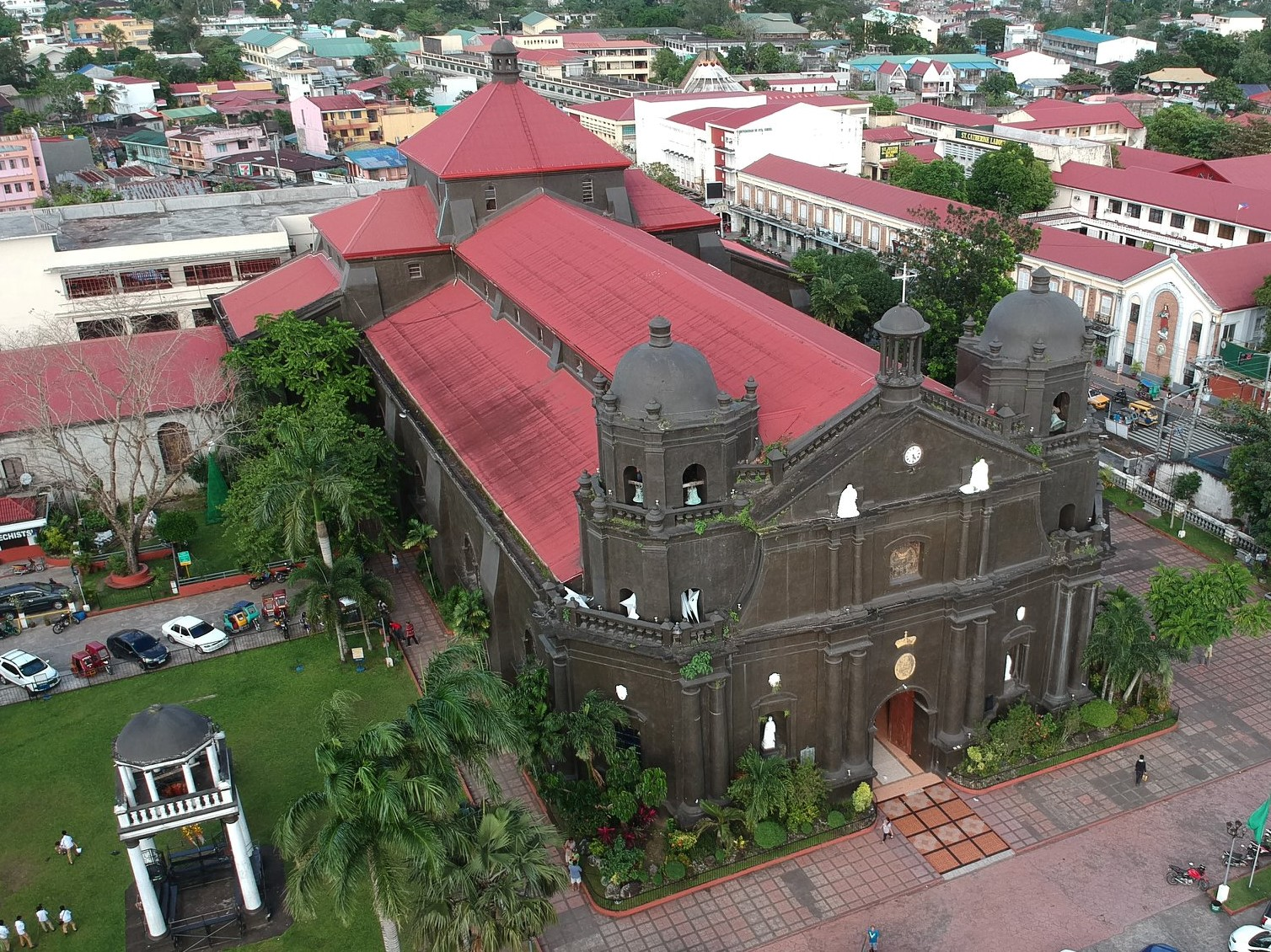
- Naga Cathedral

- Coat of arms

Location
- Country: Philippines
- Territory: Camarines Sur (except Del Gallego, Libmanan, Lupi, Milaor, Minalabac, Pamplona, Pasacao, Ragay, San Fernando and Sipocot)
- Ecclesiastical province: Cáceres
- Metropolitan: Cáceres
- Headquarters: Archbishop's Residence, Elias Angeles St., Pilgrim City of Naga

Statistics
- Area: 3,207 km^{2} (1,238 sq mi)
- Population: Total; Catholics: (as of 2021); 1,950,250; 1,742,065 (89.3%)
- Parishes: 92
- Churches: 110
- Congregations: 39
- Schools: 12

Information
- Denomination: Catholic
- Sui iuris church: Latin Church
- Rite: Roman Rite
- Established: August 14, 1595; 431 years ago (diocese); June 29, 1951; 75 years ago (archdiocese)
- Cathedral: Metropolitan Cathedral and Parish of Saint John the Evangelist
- Titular patrons: Our Lady of Peñafrancia; John the Evangelist; Pedro Bautista
- Secular priests: 193

Current leadership
- Pope: Leo XIV
- Metropolitan Archbishop: Rex Andrew Clement Alarcon
- Suffragans: Herman G. Abcede (Daet); Joel Z. Baylon (Legazpi); José R. Rojas (Libmanan); Sede Vacante (Masbate); Jose Alan V. Dialogo (Sorsogon); Luisito A. Occiano (Virac)
- Vicar General: Joseph Wilfred V. Almoneda
- Bishops emeritus: Rolando Joven Tria Tirona

Map
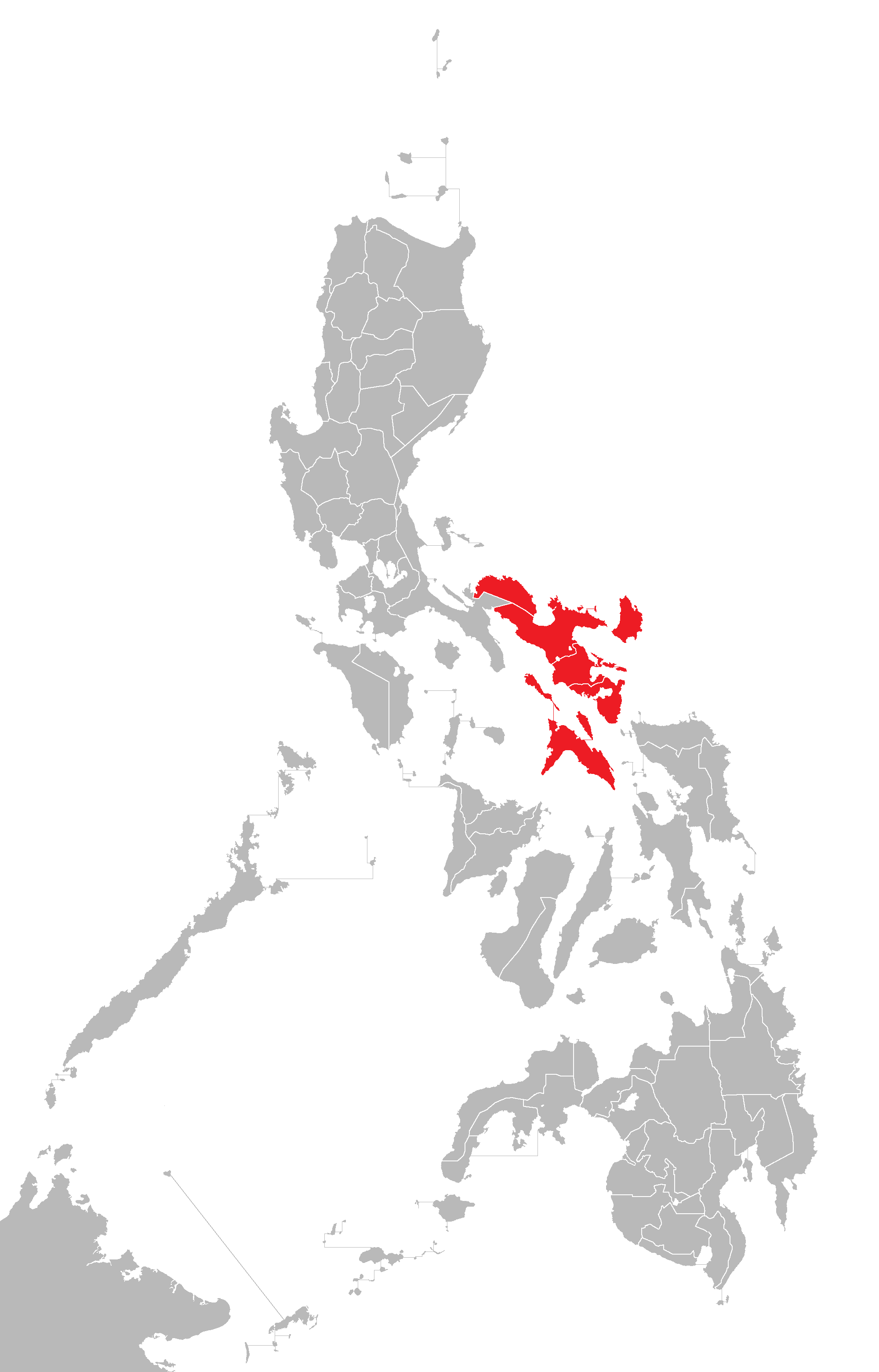
- Jurisdiction of the metropolitan see within the Philippines.

Website
- Archdiocese of Cáceres

The Metropolitan Archdiocese of Cáceres is a Latin Church archdiocese of the Catholic Church in the Philippines. It is a metropolitan see that comprises the Bicol Region, while directly overseeing the third, fourth, and fifth congressional districts of Camarines Sur, the cities of Naga and Iriga and the municipality of Gainza. The archdiocese, having been founded in 1595 in Nueva Cáceres (now Naga), is also considered one of the oldest dioceses in the Philippines with Cebu, Segovia and Manila, and once had jurisdiction that stretched from Samar in the south and Isabela Province in the north. The seat of the archdiocese is currently located in Naga, also known as the Queen City of Bicol.

The Archdiocese of Nueva Caceres is also home to Our Lady of Peñafrancia, the patroness of the Bicol Region, and is considered to be one of the largest Marian pilgrimages in Asia.

== History ==
The Diocese of Cáceres was established as the suffragan of Manila on August 14, 1595 by virtue of the papal bull Super specula militantis ecclesiae issued by Pope Clement VIII. The diocese extended over the provinces of Camarines and Albay as far as and including the islands of Ticao, Masbate, Burias and Catanduanes; the province of Tayabas as far as and including Lucban; and, in the contracosta of Mauban to Binangonan, Polo, Baler and Casiguran. The official name given to the ecclesiastical jurisdiction is "Ecclesia Cacerensis in Indiis Orientalius". The name was taken from Nueva Cáceres (now Naga City), also indicated as the seat of the diocese.

Luís de Maldonado was appointed the first Bishop of Cáceres.

It was elevated to the status of archdiocese on June 29, 1951, through the virtue of the papal bull "Quo in Philippine Republica" by Pope Pius XII. The papal bull also created its two suffragan sees—the Diocese of Legazpi and Sorsogon.

Leonardo Legaspi, who was also the first Filipino Rector Magnificus of the Pontifical and Royal University of Santo Tomas, and the first vicar of the Dominican Province of the Philippines once served as archbishop of the archdiocese.

According to a Holy See Press Office Vatican Information Service (VIS) online news release on Saturday, September 8, 2012, Pope Benedict XVI had appointed Bishop Prelate of the Roman Catholic Territorial Prelature of Infanta Rolando J. Tria Tirona as Metropolitan Archbishop of the Roman Catholic Archdiocese of Cáceres to succeed the retiring Archbishop Legaspi.

== Coat of arms ==
A pallium divides the shield into three fields. The rose and the blue background represent Our Lady of Peñafrancia, the patroness of the Bicol region.

The silver eagle against the gold background represents John the apostle and evangelist, the titular of the cathedral at Naga. The open book represents the Gospel. The thunderbolt alludes to the nickname "Boanerges" given by Jesus to John and his brother James, meaning "sons of thunder".

The three mountains represent Mounts Mayon, Isarog, and Bulusan. Above the mountains are the insignia of the Franciscan Order and below the mountains is a green palm branch that alludes to Pedro Bautista, martyred in Japan, with others, among on February 5, 1597, who was erroneously considered first bishop-elect for the see of Nueva Caceres at the time of his martyrdom and hence is venerated as the secondary patron of the cathedral.

== Ordinaries ==
=== Bishops of Cáceres ===
Name	From (Note: Denoting the date of the bishop's appointment.)	Until
Luis Maldonado, O.F.M.	August 30, 1595	1596
Francisco Ortega, O.S.A.	September 13, 1599	1602 — died
Baltazar de Cobarrubias y Múñoz, O.S.A.	January 13, 1603	June 6, 1605 — appointed, Bishop of Antequera, Oaxaca, México
Pedro de Godinez, O.F.M.	December 12, 1605	1611 — died
Pedro Matía, O.F.M.	September 17, 1612	1615 — died
Diego Guevara, O.S.A.	August 3, 1616	1623 — died
Luis de Cañizares, O.M.	July 1, 1624	June 19, 1628 — appointed, Coadjutor Bishop of Comayagua, Honduras
Francisco de Zamudio y Avendaño, O.S.A.	July 10, 1628	1639 — died
Nicolás de Zaldívar y Zapata, O.S.A.	May 2, 1644	1646 — died
Antonio de San Gregorio, O.F.M.	November 17, 1659	1661 — died
Andrés González, O.P.	September 10, 1685	February 14, 1709 — died
Domingo de Valencia	January 10, 1718	June 21, 1719 — died
Felipe Molina y Figueroa	November 20, 1724	May 1, 1738
Isidro de Arevalo	August 29, 1740	1751 — died
Manuel de Matos, O.F.M.	February 11, 1754	February 24, 1767 — died
Antonio de Luna, O.F.M.	December 19, 1768	April 16, 1773 — died
Andrés de Echeandía, O. de M.	September 11, 1775	
Francisco de Maceira, O.F.M.	December 15, 1777	
Juan Antonio Gallego y Orbigo, O.F.M.	December 14, 1778	December 15, 1788 — appointed, Archbishop of Manila
Domingo Collantes, O.P.	December 15, 1788	July 23, 1808 — died
Bernardo de la Inmaculada Concepción García Hernández, O.F.M. (Fernandez Perdigon)	September 23, 1816	October 9, 1829 — died
Juan Antonio Lillo, O.F.M.	February 28, 1831	December 3, 1840 — died
Vicente Barreiro y Pérez, O.S.A.	January 19, 1846 — appointed	April 14, 1848 — appointed, Bishop of Nueva Segovia
Manuel Grijalvo y Mínguez, O.S.A.	April 14, 1848	November 13, 1861 — died
Francisco Gaínza y Escobás, O.P.	March 5, 1862	July 31, 1879 — died
Casimiro Herrero y Pérez, O.S.A.	October 1, 1880	November 12, 1886 — died
Arsenio del Campo y Monasterio, O.S.A.	November 25, 1887	July 20, 1903 — resigned
Jorge Barlin y Imperial	December 14, 1905	September 4, 1909 — died
John Bernard MacGinley	April 2, 1910	March 24, 1924 — appointed, Bishop of Monterey-Fresno, California, U.S.
Francisco Sales Reyes y Alicante	June 20, 1925	December 15, 1937 — died
Pedro Paulo Songco Santos	May 21, 1938	June 29, 1951 — elevated Archbishop of Caceres

=== Metropolitan Archbishops of Cáceres ===
No.	Name	From (Note: Denoting the date of the archbishop's canonical installation.)	Until (Note: Denoting the date of the archbishop's retirement or death.)	Coat of Arms
1	Pedro Paulo Songco Santos	June 29, 1951	April 6, 1965 (died in office)	
2	Teopisto Valderrama Alberto	April 6, 1965 (succeeded)	October 20, 1983 (resigned)	
3	Leonardo Zamora Legaspi	January 18, 1984	September 8, 2012 (retired)	
4	Rolando Joven Tria Tirona	November 14, 2012	February 22, 2024 (retired)	
5	Rex Andrew Clement Alarcon	May 2, 2024	present	

== Coadjutor Archbishop ==
- Teopisto V. Alberto (1959–1965)

== Auxiliary bishops ==
- Juan Antonio Lillo (1828–1831), appointed bishop here
- Jose Tomas Sanchez (1968–1971), appointed Coadjutor Bishop of Lucena
- Concordio M. Sarte (1973–1977), appointed Bishop of Legazpi
- Sofio G. Balce Jr. (1980–1988), appointed Coadjutor Bishop of Cabanatuan
- Jose R. Rojas Jr. (2005–2008), appointed Prelate of Libmanan

== Other priests of this diocese who became bishops ==
- Santiago Caragnan Sancho, appointed Bishop of Tuguegarao in 1917
- Casimiro Magbanua Lladoc, appointed Bishop of Bacolod in 1933
- Flaviano Barrechea Ariola, appointed Bishop of Legazpi in 1952
- Wilfredo Dasco Manlapaz, appointed auxiliary bishop of Maasin in 1980 & appointed 3rd Bishop of Tagum until his retirement in 2018
- Manolo Alarcon de los Santos, appointed Bishop of Virac in 1994
- Adolfo Tito Camacho Yllana, appointed nuncio and titular archbishop in 2001
- Gilbert Armea Garcera, appointed Bishop of Daet in 2007 and Archbishop of Lipa in 2017.
- Rex Andrew Clement Alarcon, appointed Bishop of Daet in 2019 and Archbishop of Caceres in 2024.
- Luisito Andal Occiano, appointed Bishop of Virac in 2024.

== Curia ==
- Vicar-General – Joseph Wilfred V. Almoneda
- Chancellor – Darius S. Romualdo
- Private Secretary to the Archbishop – John Dexter Peñaflor
- Oeconomus – Eugene A. Lubigan
- Judicial Vicar – Jhun Oliva

== Suffragan dioceses ==
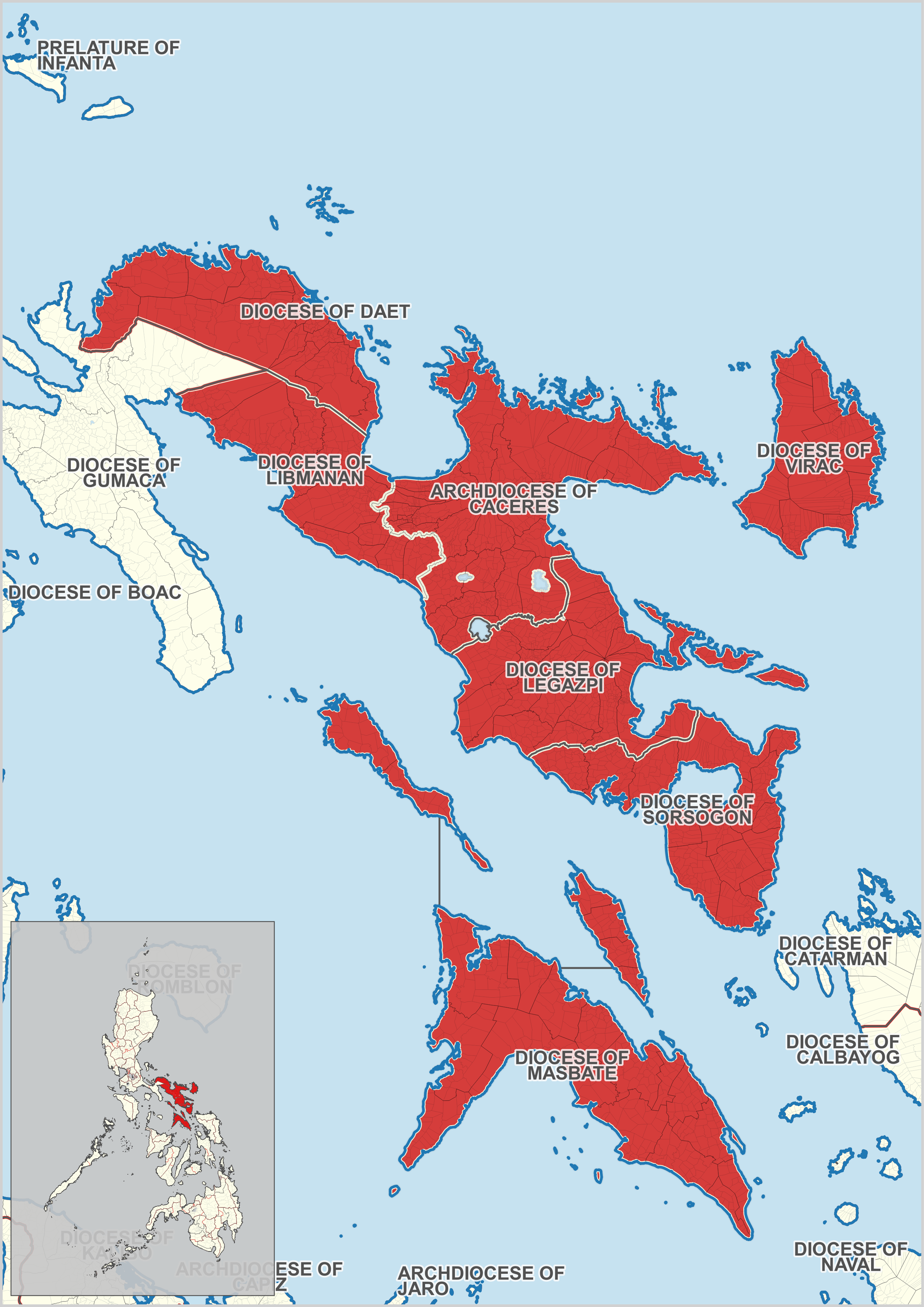
Territorial jurisdiction of the Ecclesiastical Province of Caceres.

- Daet (comprises the entire province of Camarines Norte)
- Legazpi (comprises the entire province of Albay)
- Libmanan (comprises the 1st and 2nd Districts of Camarines Sur)
- Masbate (comprises the entire province of Masbate)
- Sorsogon (comprises the entire province of Sorsogon)
- Virac (comprises the entire province of Catanduanes)

== Seminaries ==
- Holy Rosary Major Seminary
  - Concepcion Pequeña, Naga City 4400
- Holy Rosary Minor Seminary
  - Metropolitan Cathedral Complex
  - Elias Angeles St., Naga City 4400
- Holy Rosary Preparatory Seminary
  - San Jose, Camarines Sur, 4423

== See also ==
- Catholic Church in the Philippines
