= Mount Bernacci =

Mountain in Camarines Sur, Philippines

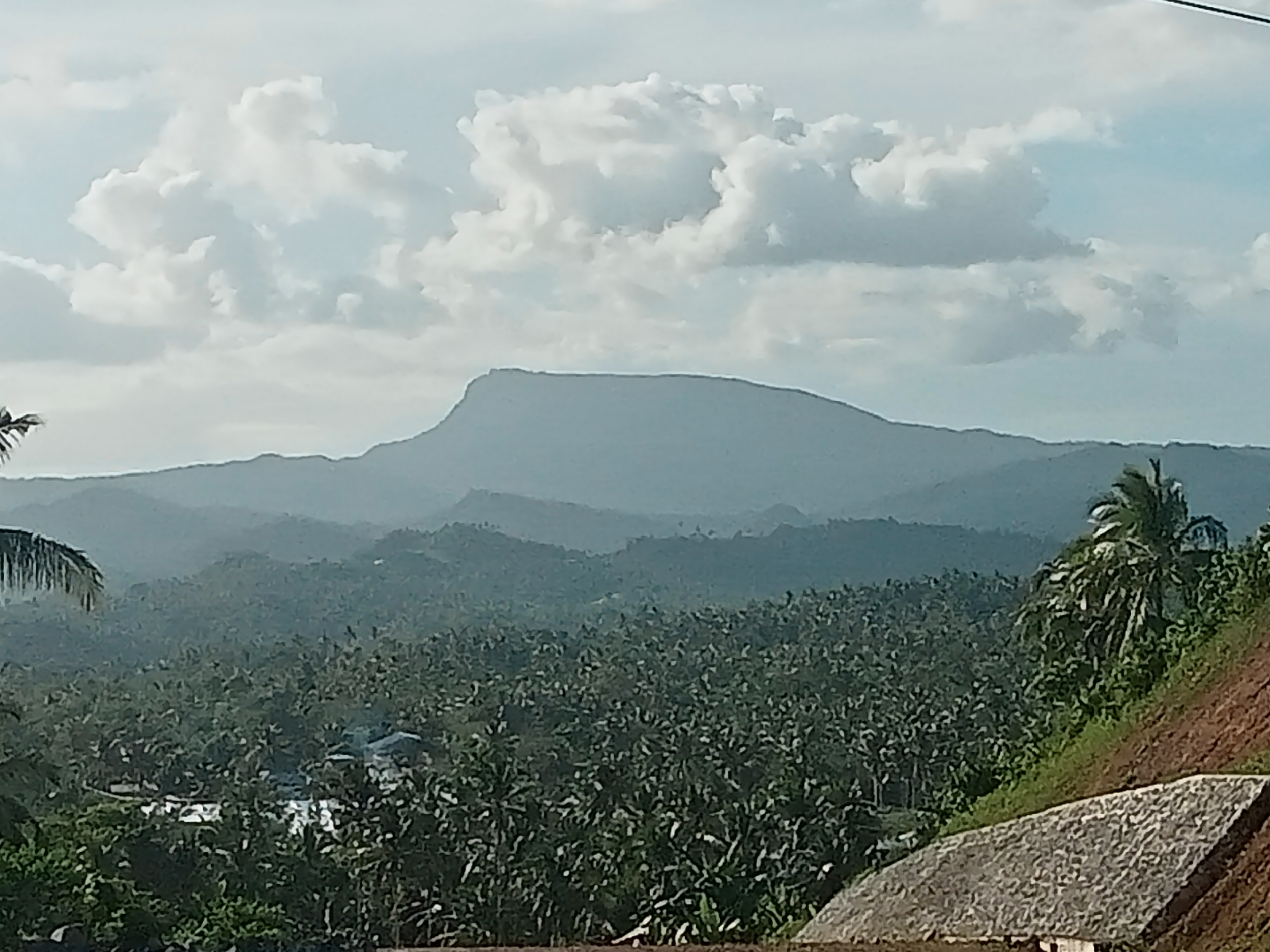
- Mount Bernacci seen from Pasacao

Highest point
- Elevation: 756 m (2,480 ft)
- Prominence: 694 m (2,277 ft)
- Parent peak: Mount Labo
- Isolation: 21.2 mi (34.1 km)
- Listing: Mountains in the Philippines
- Coordinates: 13°36′36.36″N 122°58′9.76″E

Naming
- Native name: Tangcong Vaca (Central Bikol)
- English translation: Cow's hump

Geography
- Location within Luzon Location within Philippines
- Country: Philippines
- Region: Bicol Region
- Province: Camarines Sur
- Municipality: Libmanan; Pasacao
- Parent range: Ragay Hills

Climbing
- First ascent: Unknown

Mount Bernacci (locally known as Tangcong Vaca) is a mountain in Camarines Sur, Philippines, characterized by its mesa-like profile. It rises to 756 metres (2,480 ft) above sea level. The mountain served as the base of operations for the Tangcong Vaca Guerilla Unit during the Japanese occupation, taking name from the massif.

In local folklore, the mountain is linked with the nearby Libmanan Caves National Park, and were collectively referred to as Mount Hantu or Amtig.

== Etymology ==
Mount Bernacci, locally known as Tangcong Vaca, which translates to “cow’s hump,” is named for its resemblance to the hump of a Brahman cattle.

The mountain and the nearby Libmanan caves are collectively referred to as Hantik in the local folklore. The origin of its current name, however, remains unknown.

== Geography and watersheds ==
Mount Bernacci rises to 756 metres (2,480 ft) and is located on the between Libmanan and Pasacao, covering an area of 29.75 square kilometres (11.49 sq mi). The mountain is notable for its mesa-like shape with a steep slope on its eastern side. Its geological structure consists of sedimentary strata, including massive limestone formations.

The mountain serves as an important watershed for the region, with its forests feeding several bodies nearby. Notable water features include the Caranan, Tinalmud and Itulan rivers, Caliryuhan Lake, and the Herodes and Tinandayagan waterfalls. The mountain forms part of the larger Libmanan-Pulantana Watershed, one of the major basins of the Bicol River, covering about 71,000 hectares.

=== Climate ===
Mount Bernacci has a tropical rainforest climate.

Climate data for Mount Bernacci
Month	Jan	Feb	Mar	Apr	May	Jun	Jul	Aug	Sep	Oct	Nov	Dec	Year
Mean maximum °C (°F)	22 (72)	22 (72)	24 (75)	26 (79)	26 (79)	25 (77)	24 (75)	24 (75)	24 (75)	24 (75)	23 (73)	22 (72)	26 (79)
Mean minimum °C (°F)	17 (63)	17 (63)	18 (64)	19 (66)	20 (68)	20 (68)	20 (68)	20 (68)	20 (68)	19 (66)	19 (66)	18 (64)	17 (63)
Average precipitation mm (inches)	133 (5.2)	70 (2.8)	65 (2.6)	53 (2.1)	116 (4.6)	176 (6.9)	216 (8.5)	179 (7.0)	210 (8.3)	206 (8.1)	200 (7.9)	176 (6.9)	1,800 (70.9)
Source: meteoblue.com

== Biodiversity ==
=== Birds ===
Sightings of several bird species, majority of which are endemic to the Philippines and northern Luzon, have been recorded on the mountain, this includes rufous coucal (Centropus unirufus), Philippine trogon (Harpactes ardens), coppersmith barbet (Psilopogon haemacephalus), Philippine hanging parrot (Loriculus philippensis), yellow-bellied whistler (Pachycephala philippinensis), blue-headed fantail (Rhipidura cyaniceps), black-naped monarch (Hypothymis azurea), yellow-wattled bulbul (Poliolophus urostictus), white-browed shama (Copsychus luzoniensis), bicolored flowerpecker (Dicaeum bicolor), grey-throated sunbird (Anthreptes griseigularis), and flaming sunbird (Aethopyga flagrans).

== Infrastructure ==
A wind farm project has also been announced for construction on top of the mountain, which is estimated to generate 71.40 megawatts of electricity.

== Mythology ==
The mountain, along with the nearby cave system, was referred to as Mount Hantik in the Bikolano epic Ibalong. The name derives from a large species of ants, the Oecophylla smaragdina inhabiting the caves, where Handyong drove and buried alive the cunning serpents that disguised themselves as maidens. The epic also recounts that Mount Hantik, together with Mount Kulasi (now Colasi Peak) and Isarog, erupted around 4,500 years ago.

According to oral folklore, the summit of the mountain was thought to contain a massive lagoon, which fed tributaries and helped sustain the flow of the Bicol River, underscoring the mountain’s cultural and ecological significance.

== Incidents ==
On March 8, 1965, a Filipinas Orient Airways Douglas DC-3A crashed and burned in the slope of Mount Bernacci, as it was approaching Naga Airport. The total fatalities were 10, including 3 crewmembers.

On December 15, 1993, a Philippine Air Force C-130H Hercules crashed on Mount Bernacci. The plane left Manila at 2:17 pm to deliver relief supplies to an area devastated by Typhoon Lola. The total fatalities were 30, including 6 crewmembers.
