= Dalupaon Elementary School =

Public elementary school in Camarines Sur, Philippines

- Dalupaon Elementary School (DES)

Location
- Dalupaon, Pasacao,, Camarines Sur, Philippines
- Coordinates: 13°33′04″N 122°56′49″E

Information
- Type: Government
- Motto: In hoc signo vinces ("In this sign, you will conquer")
- Established: 1966
- Principal: Mrs. Mercedita C. Bajan
- Colors: Blue and White
- Nickname: Dalupians
- Hymns: "Alma Mater Song" "Dalupians"

The Dalupaon Elementary School (DES) is a government primary school in Pasacao, Camarines Sur, Philippines. It was formally recognized as an elementary school in 1972 at Barangay Dalupaon.

The Dalupians is the official primary student publication of the Dalupaon Elementary School.

This school is a historical landmark known for keeping the remnants of a huge sawmill called "Camarin" by Spaniards and natives of Dalupaon. This was used by Spaniards in constructing two galleons during the governorship of Juan de Silva (1609-1616) that were named Nuestra Señora de Guadalupe and Santo Ángel de la Guarda. These two are among the List of ships of the line of Spain.
