= Dalupaon National High School =

Public high school in Camarines Sur, Philippines

- Dalupaon Barangay High School (DBHS)

Location
- Dalupaon, Pasacao,, Camarines Sur, Philippines
- Coordinates: 13°33′07″N 122°56′50″E

Information
- Type: Government
- Motto: In hoc signo vinces ("In this sign, you will conquer")
- Established: 1972
- Principal: Bayani B. Belga
- Grades: 7 to 12
- Colors: Blue and White
- Nickname: Dolphians
- Hymns: "Alma Mater Song" "The Dolphian's Victory"
- Website: www.dnhs.edu.ph

The Dalupaon National High School (DNHS) is a government secondary school in Pasacao, Camarines Sur, Philippines. It was founded in February 1972 at Barangay Dalupaon.

The Dolphians, founded in 2002, is the official secondary student publication of the Dalupaon National High School.
