= Prospero Nale Arellano =

- Prelate of Libmanan
- Church: Catholic Church
- See: Territorial Prelature of Libmanan
- In office: 9 December 1989 – 19 May 2008
- Predecessor: Prelature established
- Successor: José Rojas Rojas

Orders
- Ordination: 30 March 1963 by Pedro Paulo Santos
- Consecration: 19 March 1990 by Bruno Torpigliani

Personal details
- Born: 17 January 1937 Bombon, Camarines Sur, Commonwealth of the Philippines, United States
- Died: 1 February 2014 (aged 77) Bombon, Camarines Sur, Republic of the Philippines

Prospero Nale Arellano (17 January 1937 – 1 February 2014) was a Filipino Roman Catholic bishop.

Ordained to the priesthood in 1963, Arellano was appointed bishop of the Roman Catholic Diocese of Libmanan, Philippines in 1989 and resigned in 2008.
