= José Rojas Rojas =

Filipino Catholic bishop (born 1956)

The Most Reverend José Rojas Rojas Jr. D.D., S.T.D.
- Bishop of Libmanan
- Church: Roman Catholic Church
- Province: Caceres
- Diocese: Libmanan
- Appointed: March 25, 2009
- Installed: June 19, 2009
- Predecessor: Position established (Note: Prospero N. Arellano was his direct predecessor when the diocese was a territorial prelature at the time.)
- Previous posts: Auxiliary Bishop of Caceres (2005–2008); Territorial Prelate of Libmanan (2008–2009)

Orders
- Ordination: March 29, 1981 by Teopisto Valderrama Alberto
- Consecration: September 15, 2005 by Antonio Franco

Personal details
- Born: August 18, 1956 (age 70) Cebu City, Philippines
- Denomination: Roman Catholic
- Parents: José Rojas Sr. and Emiliana Rojas
- Education: Katholieke Universiteit Leuven; University of Santo Tomas
- Motto: Ipsi Gloria in Saecula "To Him be glory forever"
- Coat of arms

Styles of José R. Rojas Jr.
- Reference style: His Excellency; The Most Reverend
- Spoken style: Your Excellency
- Religious style: Bishop

José Rojas Rojas Jr. (born August 18, 1956) is a Filipino bishop of the Roman Catholic Church who has served as the first diocesan bishop of Libmanan since 2009. He previously served as territorial prelate of the then-Prelature of Libmanan from 2008 until its elevation to a full-fledged diocese in 2009.

== Early life and education ==
José Jr. was born on August 18, 1956, in Cebu City, Philippines, to parents José Rojas Sr. and Emiliana Rojas. His early education took place at Naga Parochial School from 1962 to 1968. He continued his studies at the Holy Rosary Minor Seminary in Naga City, Camarines Sur where he completed his secondary education in 1973.

He pursued his philosophical and theological studies at the Holy Rosary Major Seminary in Naga City from 1973 to 1980. After completing his seminary education, he earned a Bachelor of Sacred Theology from the University of Santo Tomas in 1980, followed by a Licentiate in Sacred Theology in 1982 from the same institution.

Furthering his academic pursuits, he obtained a Master of Arts in Religious Education from the University of Santo Tomas in 1982. He then proceeded to Belgium, where he earned a Master of Arts in Religious Studies in 1985, a Doctorate in Religious Studies in 1987, and a Doctorate in Sacred Theology in the same year from the Katholieke Universiteit Leuven.

== Priesthood ==
Rojas was ordained as a priest on March 29, 1981, at the Metropolitan Cathedral in Naga City by Archbishop Teopisto Valderrama Alberto. In the summer of that year, he served as a parochial vicar at Our Lady of Peñafrancia Parish in Naga City. The following year, he was appointed Priest-in-Charge of GRS in Ragay, Camarines Sur.

Beginning in 1982, he taught at the Holy Rosary Major Seminary, eventually becoming vice rector and professor from 1987 to 1989. He later served as rector of the seminary from 1989 to 1998, overseeing the formation of future priests. During this period, he was also chairman of the Commission on Priestly Formation and a judge in the Ecclesiastical Marriage Tribunal from 1991 to 1994.

Beyond his academic roles, he chaired several key commissions, including the Committee on the Conservation of the Holy Rosary Minor Seminary as a National Historical Landmark in 1989 and the Committee on the Consolidation of Resolution under the Archdiocesan Pastoral Council of Caceres in 1991. His contributions extended to media and social communications, serving as an auxiliary member of the Caceres Commission on Communication in 1992 and an associate judge in the Caceres Ecclesiastical Tribunal in 1998.

From 1998 to 2008, he was assigned as the parish priest of Our Lady of the Immaculate Conception Parish in Naga City while simultaneously serving as vicar general of the Archdiocese of Caceres. He took on leadership roles in the Jubilee Executive Committee for the Golden Jubilee of Caceres from 1999 to 2001 and later chaired the Second Archdiocesan Pastoral Council in 2000. His pastoral responsibilities expanded when he became director of the Caceres Family Ministry in 2001 and a member of the International Commission on Bioethics in 2004.

== Episcopal ministry ==
On July 25, 2005, Pope Benedict XVI appointed Rojas as Auxiliary Bishop of the Archdiocese of Caceres and Titular Bishop of Idassa, he was the first appointee of Pope Benedict XVI. His episcopal consecration took place on September 15, 2005, with Archbishop Antonio Franco presiding over the ceremony.

Three years later, on May 19, 2008, he was appointed as the Bishop-Prelate of the then Territorial Prelature of Libmanan. He was officially installed on July 2, 2008, and following the elevation of Libmanan to a diocese on March 25, 2009, he became its first diocesan bishop.

Within the Catholic Bishops' Conference of the Philippines, he was the vice-chairman of the Episcopal Commission on Bioethics from 2005 to 2013. He also served as the Chairman of the Episcopal Commission on Doctrine of the Faith from 2019 to 2025.

== Notes ==
Catholic Church titles
| Preceded by Bogdan Bejze | — TITULAR — Titular Bishop of Idassa; September 15, 2005 – May 19, 2008 | Succeeded by Vincent Jordy |
| Preceded by Prospero N. Arellano | Prelate of Libmanan; July 2, 2008 – March 25, 2009 | Succeeded by Himself as Bishop of Libmanan |
| New title | Bishop of Libmanan; June 19, 2009 – present | Incumbent |
