= Libmanan =

Municipality in Camarines Sur, Philippines

- Municipality
- Municipality of Libmanan
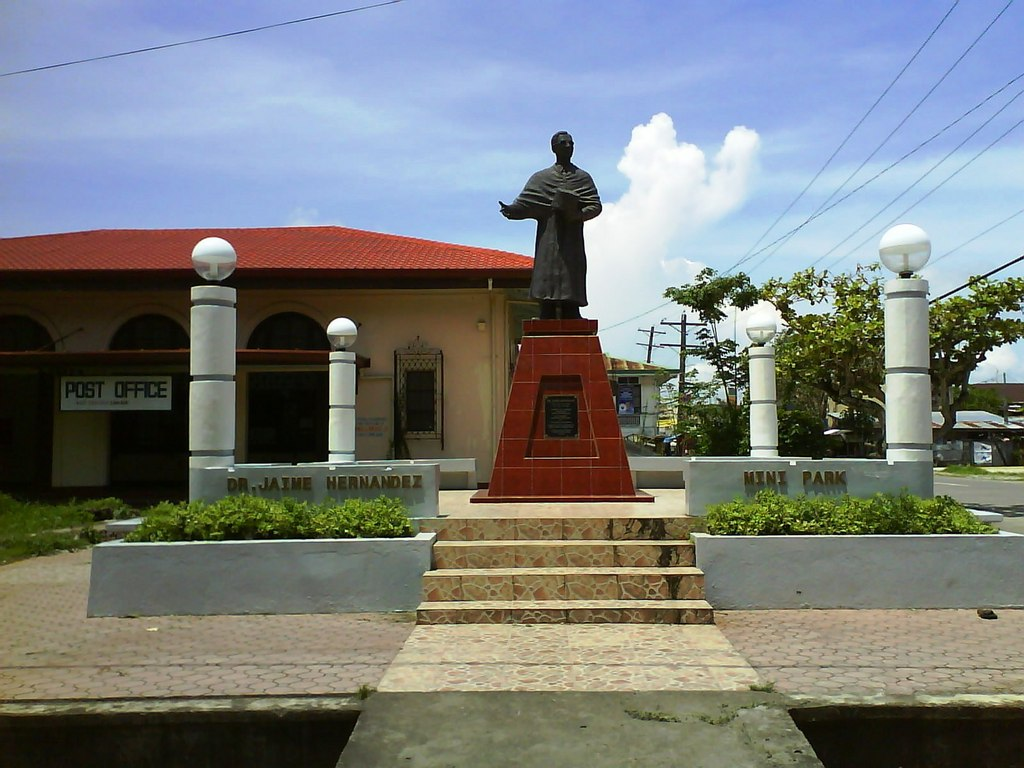
- J. Hernandez Park Libmanan

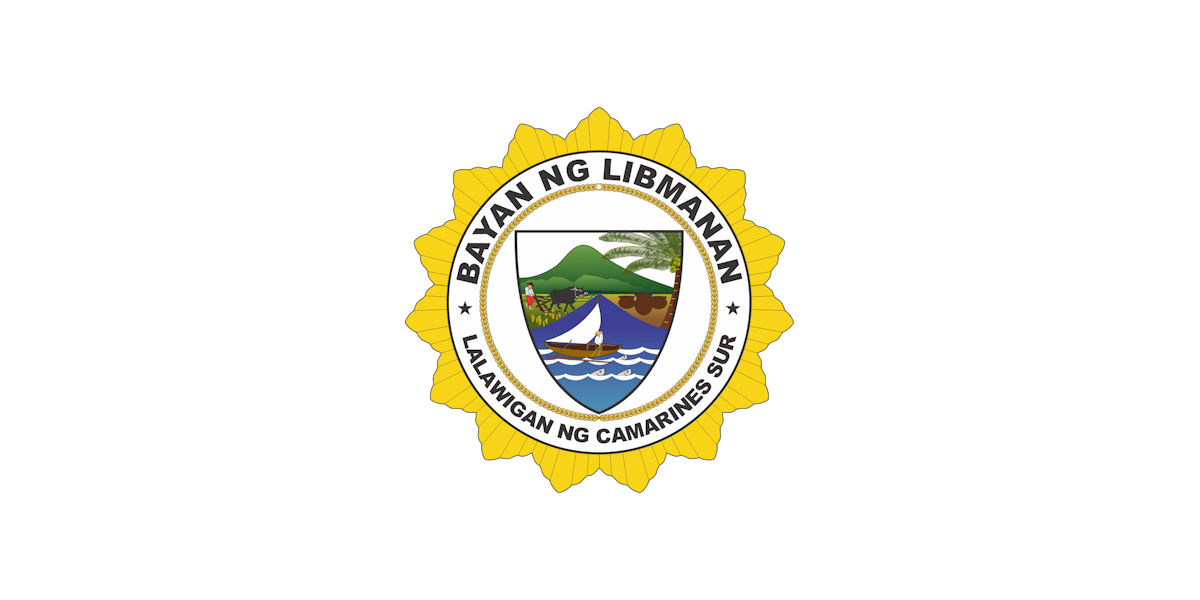
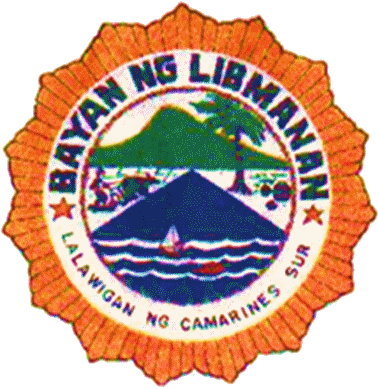
- Flag Seal
- Nickname: Rice Granary of Camarines Sur
- Map of Camarines Sur with Libmanan highlighted
- Interactive map of Libmanan
- Location within the Philippines
- Coordinates: 13°41′47″N 123°03′36″E
- Country: Philippines
- Region: Bicol Region
- Province: Camarines Sur
- District: 2nd district
- Founded: April 3, 1574
- Barangays: 75 (see Barangays)

Government
  - Type: Sangguniang Bayan
  - Mayor: Edelson M. Marfil
  - Vice Mayor: Ariel Oriño
  - Representative: Vincenzo Renato "Luigi" Reyes Villafuerte
  - Municipal Council: Members: Gerymar M. Atienza II; Gerardo "Don Don" M. Atienza Jr.; Jerry R. Tendero; Alex Mendoza; Fredis R. Opancia; Richard Datoon; Jose San Buenaventura; Romel T. Bulaong
  - Electorate: 72,704 voters (2025)

Area
  - Total: 342.82 km^{2} (132.36 sq mi)
- Elevation: 7.0 m (23.0 ft)
- Highest elevation (Mount Bernacci): 55 m (180 ft)
- Lowest elevation: −2 m (−6.6 ft)

Population (2024 census)
  - Total: 113,254
  - Density: 330.36/km^{2} (855.63/sq mi)
  - Households: 25,798

Economy
  - Income class: 1st municipal income class
  - Poverty incidence: 29.81% (2023)
  - Revenue: ₱ 440.3 million (2024)
  - Assets: ₱ 1,241 million (2024)
  - Expenditure: ₱ 449.6 million (2024)

Service provider
  - Electricity: Camarines Sur 1 Electric Cooperative (CASURECO 1)
- Time zone: UTC+8 (PST)
- ZIP code: 4407
- PSGC: 0501718000
- IDD : area code: +63 (0)54
- Native languages: Central Bikol; Tagalog

Libmanan, officially the Municipality of Libmanan (Central Bikol: Banwaan kan Libmanan; Tagalog: Bayan ng Libmanan), is a municipality in the province of Camarines Sur, Philippines. According to the 2024 census, it has a population of 113,254 people.

Its history dates back before the beginning of Spanish colonization. The municipality is home to a number of beautiful historic Art Deco buildings including the palatial Morales Ruins which soar over the road entering Libmanan proper.

== History ==
Libmanan was a barrio of Quipayo in 1580 with the name of "Pinaglabanan". Records from a historian Mauro B. Avila, revealed that the municipality was named Libmanan on September 15, 1574. Missionaries started working in Libmanan in 1589 and the area's church was dedicated to St. James the Apostle.

German ethnographer Fedor Jagor described visiting Libmanan in his 1875 work "Travels in the Philippines", wherein he visited the local parish priest and learned from him about an ancient human settlement that had been dug up in 1851 during road construction in the Poro area of the southwest close near the Tres Marias islands: the excavation consisted of "numerous remains of the early inhabitants—skulls, ribs, bones of men and animals, a child’s thighbone inserted in a spiral of brass wire, several stags’ horns, beautifully-formed dishes and vessels, some of them painted, probably of Chinese origin; striped bracelets, of a soft, gypseous, copper-red rock, gleaming as if they were varnished; small copper knives, but no iron utensils; and several broad flat stones bored through the middle; besides a wedge of petrified wood, embedded in a cleft branch of a tree." The 1818 Spanish census recorded the area as having 1,490 native families and 1 Spanish-Filipino family.

During the occupation of their country by the United States, the Philippine Legislature greatly expanded the network of railroads throughout the island of Luzon, and a railway headed to the city of Legazpi, Albay and Naga, Camarines Sur was built through Libmanan to provide direct access to those cities. This railway was damaged severely during World War II, but partially restored using American funds thereafter, providing transportation service down the Bicol Peninsula off and on until ending in 2012 despite plans to rehabilitate the route.

The historic Morales Ruins Art Deco mansion at the heart of the town was built in 1937 by the Rev. Friar Mariano Roldan for his parents, and was eventually sold to the Morales family whose name the ruins now bear. It is noted for art deco frescos which are emblematic of the period in which it was built, one of which includes a defiantly displayed Filipino national flag, which would have been disallowed by the American and Japanese occupiers of the time.

Even during the time of the Spaniards, the town of Libmanan was already considered the "rice basket" of the province. This generous production of rice is attributed to the fertile soil and the town's abundant water supply. In 1991 the area's irrigation canals (shared with its northern neighbor Cabusao, Camarines Sur) were sufficient to water 2996 hectares of land during the dry season.

Barangay Poblacion is often referred by locals as "Libmanan" while the surrounding urban Barangays are referred to as "Metropolitan Libmanan" or "Greater Poblacion Area" unofficial.

== Geography ==
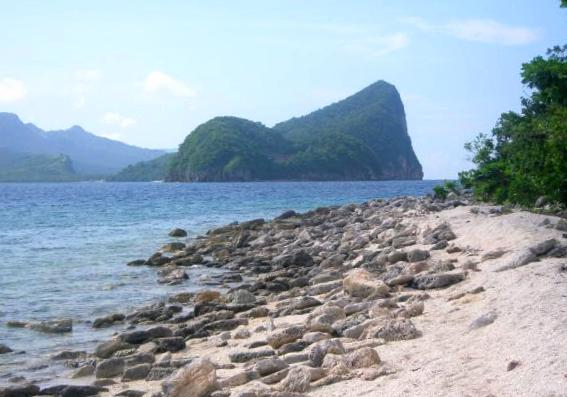
Puro Island in Ragay Gulf

Libmanan has three sectors: built up areas, flat land areas and mountainous land. 13,940 ha are flat land 19,239 ha are mountainous land and the remaining 1,103 ha are built up areas, totalling in 34,282 hectares.

Libmanan is the largest municipality in Camarines Sur in terms of population, and the second largest in terms of land area. It stretched across nearly the whole width of the Bicol peninsula, from where it borders Cabusao Municipality on the San Miguel Bay all the way out to Ragay Gulf, including three islands known locally as the 'Tres Marias', including one island known as 'puro island'. The main town, or 'poblacion', is located along the Libmanan River on the lowland alluvial plain adjacent to Cabusao.

Heading to the southern coast from the poblacion the municipality becomes hilly. In this hilly region between the poblacion and the highway lies the Libmanan Caves National Park. Continuing on towards the coast from the hills, the municipality becomes truly mountainous beginning in Barangay Malinao beyond the Pan-Philippine Highway, where the "Boro-Boro Spring Resort" is located; a series of waterfalls that are a locally popular swimming destination. Beyond Malinao the upland region features the mountain 'Mount Bernacci (Tancong Vaca' - in the local dialect meaning 'the cow's hump') - which is a local landmark visible from most locations on the Pan-Philippine Highway in western Camarines Sur and was a base of operations for local guerrillas fighting the Japanese during World War II. Up to the present day, the area around Tancong Vaca has remained an area of conflict between anti-government insurgents and the Philippine National Police.

The municipality's rural barangays lie behind Mount Bernacci, and mostly lack access to paved roads, of which there is only one which terminates in the fishing village of Barangay Bahao, within sight of the tres Marias.

=== Climate ===
Climate data for Libmanan, Camarines Sur
Month	Jan	Feb	Mar	Apr	May	Jun	Jul	Aug	Sep	Oct	Nov	Dec	Year
Mean daily maximum °C (°F)	33 (91)	31 (88)	35 (95)	37 (99)	38 (100)	37 (99)	36 (97)	34 (93)	35 (95)	34 (93)	33 (91)	32 (90)	35 (94)
Mean daily minimum °C (°F)	27 (81)	27 (81)	29 (84)	31 (88)	32 (90)	32 (90)	30 (86)	29 (84)	30 (86)	29 (84)	28 (82)	28 (82)	29 (85)
Average precipitation mm (inches)	44.2 (1.74)	52.17 (2.05)	45.43 (1.79)	54.15 (2.13)	92.29 (3.63)	182.23 (7.17)	289.11 (11.38)	260.6 (10.26)	180.07 (7.09)	340.22 (13.39)	98.7 (3.89)	337.4 (13.28)	1,976.57 (77.8)
Average rainy days	21	22	19	19	24	26	30	29	27	29	24	29	299
Source: World Weather Online (modeled/calculated data, not measured locally)

=== Barangays ===
Libmanan is politically subdivided into 75 barangays. Each barangay consists of puroks and some have sitios.

Currently, there are 5 of which located in the coastal areas and the remaining 70 barangays are distributed in the low land and upland portions of the municipality. Its town center, poblacion or centro, is 7.7 kilometres (4.8 mi) away from the National Highway. The road leading to Poblacion and other major baranggays is marked by a memorial for the Ten Outstanding Young Men trophy awarded to a past mayor and local hero, former Camarines Sur Governor Jose Bulaong.

- Aslong
- Awayan
- Bagacay
- Bagadion
- Bagamelon
- Bagumbayan
- Bahao
- Bahay
- Beguito Nuevo
- Beguito Viejo
- Bigajo Norte
- Bigajo Sur
- Bikal
- Busak
- Caima
- Calabnigan
- Camambugan
- Cambalidio
- Candami
- Candato
- Cawayan
- Concepcion
- Cuyapi
- Danawan
- Duang Niog
- Handong
- Ibid
- Inalahan
- Labao
- Libod I
- Libod II
- Loba-loba
- Mabini
- Malansad Nuevo
- Malansad Viejo
- Malbogon
- Malinao
- Mambalite
- Mambayawas
- Mambulo Nuevo
- Mambulo Viejo
- Mancawayan
- Mandacanan
- Mantalisay
- Padlos
- Pag-Oring Nuevo
- Pag-Oring Viejo
- Palangon
- Palong
- Patag
- Planza
- Poblacion
- Potot
- Puro-Batia
- Rongos
- Salvacion
- San Isidro
- San Juan
- San Pablo
- San Vicente
- Sibujo
- Sigamot
- Station-Church Site
- Taban-Fundado
- Tampuhan
- Tanag
- Tarum
- Tinalmud Nuevo
- Tinalmud Viejo
- Tinanquihan
- Udok
- Umalo
- Uson
- Villasocorro
- Villadima (Santa Cruz)

== Demographics ==
Population census of Libmanan

Year	Pop.	±% p.a.
1903	17,416	—
1918	11,729	−2.60%
1939	23,000	+3.26%
1948	43,482	+7.33%
1960	52,512	+1.58%
1970	62,762	+1.80%

Year	Pop.	±% p.a.
1975	66,601	+1.20%
1980	68,413	+0.54%
1990	77,565	+1.26%
1995	85,337	+1.81%
2000	88,476	+0.78%
2007	92,839	+0.67%

Year	Pop.	±% p.a.
2010	100,002	+2.74%
2015	108,716	+1.60%
2020	112,994	+0.82%
2024	113,254	+0.06%

Source: Philippine Statistics Authority

=== Religion ===
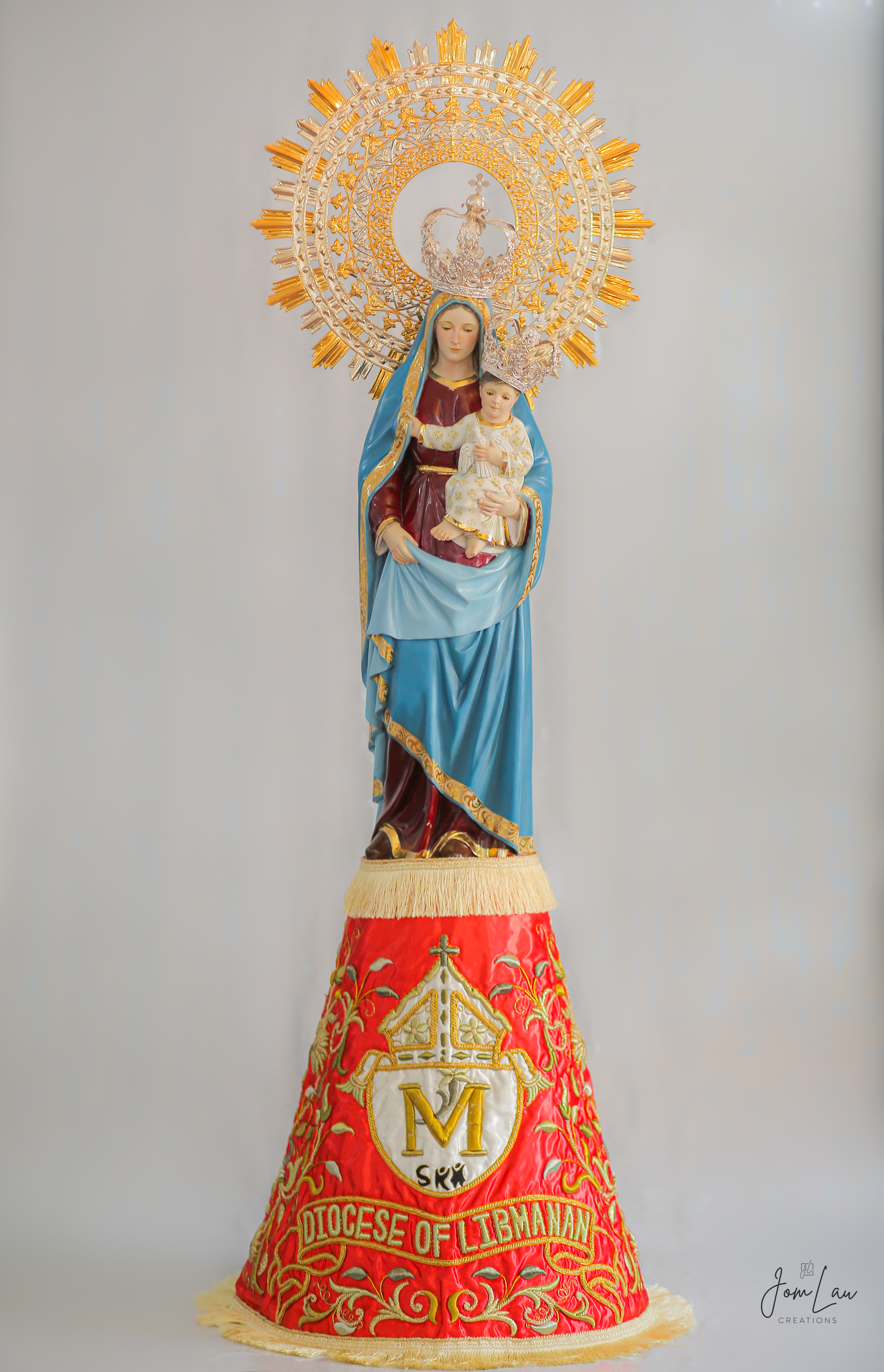
The pontifically crowned statue of Nuestra Señora del Pilar de Libmanan who is the Queen and Patroness of the Diocese of Libmanan

The religious needs of its people and those of neighboring towns prompted the erection of the Prelature of Libmanan in 1990 and installation the first bishop, Msgr. Prospero N. Arellano. On 25 March 2009 Pope Benedict XVI elevated the prelature to become a diocese with Bishop Jose Rojas Rojas becoming its first bishop.

The Catholic Bishops' Conference of the Philippines lists the following Catholic church parishes of Libmanan:

Parish	Barangay	Fiesta Day
St. James the Apostle	Libmanan Centro	July 25
Our Lady of Pillar	San Isidro	October 12
St. Vincent Ferrer	San Vicente	April 25
St. Anthony de Padua	Mambulo Nuevo	1st Tuesday of June

Churches in Libmanan:

- Santiago el Mayor Cathedral-Parish (est.1586)
- San Vicente Ferrer Parish (est.1954)
- Nuestra Señora del Pilar Shrine-Parish (est.1985)
- Nuestra Señora de Lourdes Parish (est.2000)
- San Antonio de Padua Parish (est.2001)
- San José el Patriarca Parish (est.2003)
- San Francisco de Asís Parish (est.2020)

== Economy ==
Poverty incidence of Libmanan (%)

Source: Philippine Statistics Authority

Libmanan, one of the largest and most populous municipalities in the province, benefits from the transportation being offered by the Libmanan River, the railroad, and the national highway. Though rail service through Libmanan no longer connects directly to Manila there are still commuter trips available bringing passengers to nearby Naga, Camarines Sur and the route that was reopened in 2015 bringing them all the way to Legazpi, Albay.

Generally, Libmanan soil is adapted for growing different agricultural products. Portions are also adopted to pottery-the making of which has been a local industry for centuries. Libmanan has been the “rice-basket” not only of the province but of Southern Luzon-even during the Spanish regime. In spite of problems encountered by rice farmers, Libmanan maintains its status of being the rice granary of the province.

Libmanan is the heart of the provinces of Camarines Sur, Quezon and Camarines Norte making the municipality the rice basket of Southern Luzon, other than these provinces products can also reach Metro Manila.

Barangays of Bahao, Mambulo Nuevo, San Isidro, Bahay and Sibujo act as rural financial centers.

== Infrastructure ==
Libmanan is connected to Naga City through the Pan Philippine highway or AH26. The Poblacíon can be accessed through Bagacay Road (From South) and the Main Libmanan road (from North). Libmanan has 4 main roads longest one is the Pan Philippine highway that stretches from Beguito Viejo to Mambulo Nuevo second one is Libmanan Canaman Cabusao road that runs from Poblacion Area of Libmanan to Cabusao. Third is Bagacay Road that runs from Barangay Bagacay to the intersection of Libmanan road. The western and coastal Barangays can be reached through the new Bahao road that was constructed in 2019 this road not only serves as an enhancement to tourism but also to trade and industry, however some barangays of Libmanan still need an improvement on road infrastructure otherwise those Barangays will progress slow or even stagnant economy.

== Heritage ==
Morales Mansion

The town possess one of the most important cultural examples of ancestral houses in western Camarines Sur. Among these architectural marvels are the 1920s municipal hall building with its arcade-embellished facade, the 1875 Dilanco House which is the oldest structure in the town and was home to three former municipal mayors, the 1937 Morales Ruins which is the most culturally-important Art Deco building in the town, the Nacieno House which is another Art Deco ancestral house, and the 1926 Jaucian House Jose Jaucian Sr. Another ancestral house that was demolished in the late 1970s is the house built by Don Celedonio Reyes, it was demolished to make way for more modern buildings opf the Bicol Central Academy.

Most heritage houses in the town have already been abandoned, including the Morales Ruins, Nacieno House, and the Dilanco House. In 2013, a campaign was administered by some locals to transform the Morales Ruins into a municipal museum, along with other heritage houses in the town to spur a heritage-based tourism industry and to conserve the remaining immovable cultural heritage of the town.

== Government ==
List of former chief executives:

- 1732-1755: Capt. Josep Domingo Ramos
- 1756-1758: Capt. Feipe Medina
- 1759-1760: Capt. Jose Guevarra
- 1761: Capt. Sebastian De la Cruz
- 1762-1763: Capt. Pascual de Lajor
- 1764: Capt. Luis Arambulo
- 1765: Capt. Francisco Severo
- 1766: Capt. Pedro Simon
- 1767-1768: Capt. Miguel Damiano
- 1769: Capt. Antonio De Leon
- 1770-1771: Capt. Domingo De la Concepcion
- 1772: Capt. Francisco Catimbang
- 1773: Capt. Francisco Del Llagas
- 1774-1777: Capt. Domingo De la Cruz
- 1778: Capt. Francisco Del Llagas
- 1779: Capt. Matias Cabanos
- 1780: Capt. Antonio De Leon
- 1781: Capt. Miguel Damiano
- 1782: Capt. Matias Cabanos
- 1783: Capt. Antonio De Leon
- 1784: Capt. Domingo De la Concepcion
- 1785: Capt. Victorino Simon
- 1786: Capt. Pedro Gonzales
- 1787: Capt. Tomas Baldesoto
- 1788: Capt. Domingo De la Concepcion
- 1789: Capt. Luis Arambulo
- 1790: Capt. Domingo De la Concepcion
- 1791: Capt. Nicholas Tolentino
- 1792: Capt. Victorino Simon
- 1793: Capt. Francisco Del Llagas
- 1794: Capt. Juan De la Cruz
- 1795-1796: Capt. Mateo De la Concepcion
- 1797: Capt. Miguel De la Concepcion
- 1798: Capt. Marcelino De la Trinidad
- 1799: Capt. Pedro Baldesoto
- 1800: Capt. Francisco Espiritu
- 1801: Capt. Clemente Eugenio
- 1802: Capt. Francisco del Llagas
- 1803: Capt. Juan San Antonio
- 1804: Capt. Luis Balaguer
- 1805: Capt. Melchor de los Reyes
- 1806: Capt. Francisco del Llagas
- 1807: Capt. Mariano de los Nieves
- 1808: Capt. Juan San Antonio
- 1809: Capt. Santiago Arambulo
- 1810: Capt. Melchor de los Reyes
- 1811: Capt. Tomas de la Soledad
- 1812: Capt. Fabiano de Galicia
- 1813: Capt. Esteban Anunciacion
- 1814: Capt. Juan Ramirez
- 1815: Capt. Antonio San Pascual
- 1816: Capt. Miguel Juliano Francisco
- 1817: Capt. Jose del Puerto
- 1818: Capt. Francisco Santa Maria
- 1819: Capt. Pedro Alcantara
- 1820: Capt. Pedro Sabino
- 1821: Capt. Ambrosio de la Cruz
- 1822: Capt. Francisco Custudio
- 1823: Capt. Placido Anunciacion
- 1824: Capt. Matias Manga
- 1825: Capt. Maximo Fernandez
- 1826: Capt. Augustin Tolentino
- 1827: Capt. Placido Anunciacion
- 1828: Capt. Pedro San Pablo Alcantara
- 1829: Capt. Maximo Fernandez
- 1830: Capt. Mariano Villanueva
- 1831: Capt. Vicente Cabanos
- 1832: Capt. Ludovico Lopez
- 1833: Capt. Martin Gonzales
- 1834: Capt. Carlos de los Santos
- 1835: Capt. Andres Espiritu
- 1836: Capt. Pater de Avila
- 1837: Capt. Hilario Domingo
- 1838: Capt. Santiago Aguirre
- 1839-1840: Capt. Maximo Hernandez
- 1841: Capt. Luis Alcantara
- 1842: Capt. Sebastian Baldesoto
- 1843: Capt. Placido Anunciacion
- 1844: Capt. Francisco Espiritu
- 1845: Capt. Marianon Natividad
- 1846: Capt. Isidro Archangel
- 1847: Capt. Rufino Nacianceno
- 1848: Capt. Anacleto de los Santos
- 1849: Capt. Facundo del Pascual
- 1850: Capt. Francisco Gonzales
- 1851-1852: Capt. Pacifico Roldan
- 1853: Capt. Bruno Sol
- 1854: Capt. Salvador Espiritu
- 1855: Capt. Mariano Albacarte
- 1856: Capt. Aniceto Floresca
- 1857: Capt. Victoriano Bautista
- 1858: Capt. Casiano Flores
- 1859: Capt. Mariano Septimo
- 1860: Capt. Mariano Rubi
- 1861: Capt. Domingo Durante
- 1862: Capt. Ramon Hernandez
- 1863-1864: Capt. Juan Hernandez
- 1865-1866: Capt. Tomas Durante
- 1867-1868: Capt. Juan Razonable
- 1869-1870: Capt. Mariano Angeles
- 1871-1872: Capt. Agaton Ursua
- 1873-1874: Capt. Juan Sanchez
- 1875-1878: Capt. Rufino Hernandez
- 1879-1880: Capt. Rafael Nacianceno
- 1881-1882: Capt. Anacleto Atendido
- 1883-1884: Capt. Rufino Hernandez
- 1885-1886: Capt. Agustin Abellera
- 1887: Capt. Vicente Ursua
- 1888-1889: Capt. Agaton Ursua
- 1890-1891: Capt. Norberto Durante
- 1892-1893: Capt. Celedonio Reyes
- 1894: Capt. Raymundo Espiritu
- 1895-1898: Capt. Casimiro Onate
- 1899-1901: Pres. Celedonio Reyes
- 1902-1903: Pres. Francisco Ursua
- 1904-1905: Pres. Nicolas Ortiz
- 1906-1907: Pres. Ligorio Colores
- 1908-1910: Pres. Nicolas Ortiz
- 1911-1912: Pres. Antonio Peredo
- 1913-1915: Pres. Vicente Aureus
- 1916-1921: Pres. Ramon Hernandez
- 1922-1926: Pres. Marciano Bagadion
- 1927-1931: Pres. Macario Zeda
- 1932-1937: Mayor Teodoro Dilanco
- 1938-1940: Mayor Francisco Frondozo
- 1941-1942: Mayor Teodoro Dilanco
- 1943-1945: Mayor Eliseo Portin
- 1946-1947: Mayor Policarpo Benitez
- 1948-1951: Mayor Policarpo Benitez
- 1952-1955: Mayor Teofilo Dilanco
- 1956-1959: Mayor Teofilo Dilanco
- 1960-1971: Mayor Amadeo Castaneda
- 1972-1979: Mayor Jose Bulaong, M.D.
- October 1979-April 1980: Actg. Mayor Jose Villaluz, M.D.
- 1980-1986: Mayor Jose Bulaong, M.D.
- March 1986-November 1987: Mayor Juan Echano (OIC)
- December 1987-June 1988: Mayor Ramon Villaluz
- 1988-1998: Mayor Teodoro Dilanco III
- 1998-June 2001: Mayor Gerardo Atienza Sr.
- July 2001-June 2010: Mayor Rodolfo Jimenez Sr.
- July 2010–June 2016: Mayor Marilyn Jimenez
- July 2016–June 2022: Mayor Bernard Brioso
- July 2022–June 2025: Mayor Jesus Camara
- July 2025 – present: Mayor Edelson Marfil

== Education ==
There are two schools district offices which govern all educational institutions within the municipality. They oversee the management and operations of all private and public, from primary to secondary schools. These are the:

- Libmanan North Schools District
- Libmanan South Schools District

The Department of Education (Philippines) lists the following schools for Libmanan:

=== Primary and elementary schools ===
- Arborvitae Plains Montessori
- Aslong Elementary School
- Awayan Elementary School
- Bagacay Primary School
- Bagadion Elementary School
- Bagamelon Elementary School
- Bahao Elementary School
- Bahay Elementary School
- Beguito Nuevo Elementary School
- Beguito Viejo Elementary School
- Bigajo Sur Primary School
- Bikal Elementary School
- Caima Elementary School
- Calabnigan Elementary School
- Camambugan Elementary School
- Camdilancha Elementary School
- Candami Elementary School
- Candato Elementary School
- Cawayan Elementary School
- Colegio del Santisimo Rosario
- Concepcion Elementary School
- Don Jose Ursua Elementary School
- Duang Niog Elementary School
- Ezer Christian School
- Fortunate Rays Learning Center
- Fundado Elementary School
- Ibid Elementary School
- Inalahan Elementary School
- Labao Elementary School
- Libmanan North Central School
- Libmanan South Central School
- Loba-Loba Elementary School
- Malansad Nuevo Elementary School
- Malansad Viejo Elementary School
- Malbogon Elementary School
- Mambalite Primary School
- Mambayawas Elementary School
- Mambulo Nuevo Elementary School
- Mambulo Viejo Elementary School
- Mancawayan Elementary School
- Mandacanan Primary School
- Mantalisay Elementary School
- Marian Formation Centers
- New Anglo-Fil-Chinese School Foundation
- Odoc Elementary School
- Padlos Elementary School
- Pag-Oring Nuevo Elementary School
- Palangon Elementary School
- Palong Primary School
- Patag Elementary School
- Potot Elementary School
- Salvacion Elementary School
- San Juan Elementary School
- San Pablo Integated School
- San Vicente Elementary School
- Sigamot Elementary School
- Sixto Bulaong Elementary School
- Sogod Elementary School
- St. Joseph Academy
- Sta. Cruz Elementary School
- Tampuhan Elementary School
- Tanag Elementary School
- Tarum Elementary School
- Tinalmud Elementary School
- Tinanquihan Primary School
- Trade Frontier Kids Academy
- Umalo Elementary School
- Uson Elementary School
- Villa Socorro Elementary School
- Villadima Elementary School

=== Secondary schools ===
- Bagadion High School
- Bahao National High School
- Bahay Provincial High School
- Bicol Central Academy
- Calabnigan Green Meadows High School
- Carmel National High School
- Central Bicol State University (High School)
- Colegio del Santisimo Rosario
- Don Mariano C. San Juan High School
- Don Teofilo H. Dilanco Memorial High School
- Dr. Nelson A. Mejia National High School
- Eduardo V. Agomaa National High School
- Genova Technological Institute
- Homobono H. Gonzalez National High School
- Malansad National High School
- Malansad Nuevo National High School
- Mambayawas High School
- Mambulo Nuevo National High School
- Mantalisay National High School
- Northern Plain High School
- Pag-Oring Nuevo National High School
- Palangon High School
- San Isidro National High School
- San Juan National High School
- San Pablo Integrated School

=== Higher educational institutions ===
- Camarines Sur Institute of Fisheries & Marine Sciences
- Governor Mariano E. Villafuerte Community College
- Luis H. Dilanco Sr. Foundation College

== Churches ==
- Catedral de Santiago el Mayor Apóstol - Poblacion (est. 1586)
- San Vicente Ferrer Parish - San Vicente (est. 1954)
- Santuario Diocesano de Nuestra Señora del Pilar - San Isidro (est. 1985)
- Nuestra Señora de Lourdes Parish - Bahao (est. 2000)
- San Antonio de Padua Parish - Mambulo Nuevo (est. 2001)
- San José el Patriarca Parish - Bahay (est. 2003)
- San Francisco de Asís Parish - Cambalidio (est. 2020)
