= Diocese of Libmanan =

Latin Catholic diocese in the Philippines

Coordinates: 13.6928°N 123.0590°E

Diocese of Libmanan Dioecesis Libmanana Diosesis kan Libmanan Diyosesis ng Libmanan

Catholic
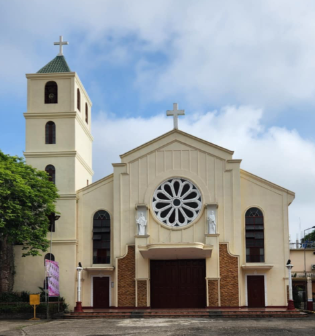
- St James The Greater Parish Cathedral

- Coat of arms

Location
- Country: Philippines
- Territory: Western Camarines Sur (Cabusao, Del Gallego, Libmanan, Lupi, Milaor, Minalabac, Pamplona, Pasacao, Ragay, San Fernando, Sipocot)
- Ecclesiastical province: Caceres
- Metropolitan: Caceres

Statistics
- Area: 1,862 km^{2} (719 sq mi)
- Population: Total; Catholics: (as of 2021); 539,854; 500,984 (92.5%)

Information
- Denomination: Catholic
- Sui iuris church: Latin Church
- Rite: Roman Rite
- Established: June 19, 2009
- Cathedral: Cathedral of St. James the Apostle

Current leadership
- Pope: Leo XIV
- Bishop: José R. Rojas
- Metropolitan Archbishop: Archbishop Rex Andrew Alarcon
- Vicar General: Camilo B. Palma, Jr.

Map
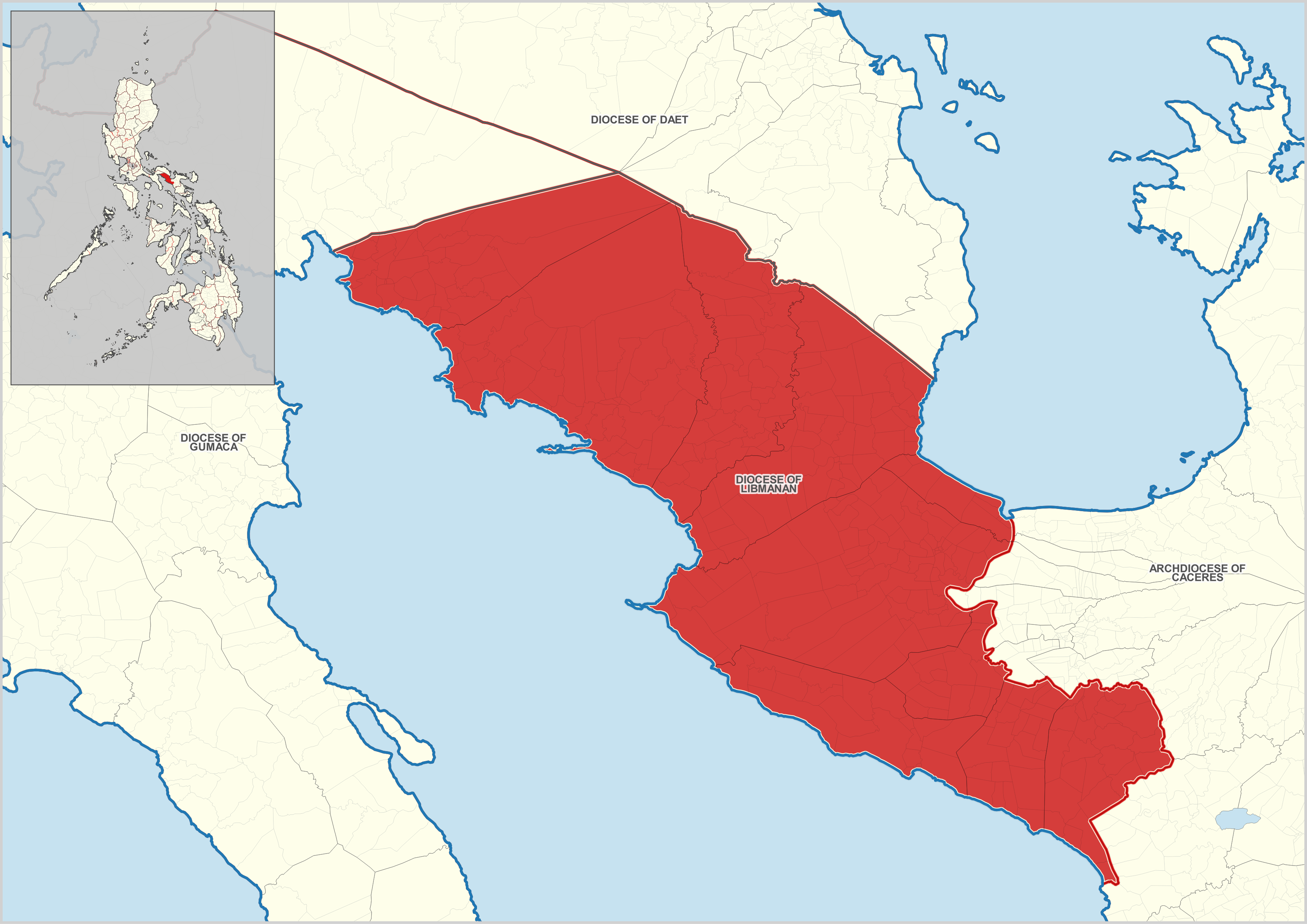
- Territorial jurisdiction of the Diocese of Libmanan

The Diocese of Libmanan (Latin: Dioecesis Libmanana) is a Latin Catholic diocese located in the municipality of Libmanan in the ecclesiastical province of Caceres in the Philippines.

== History ==
- December 9, 1989: Established as the Territorial Prelature of Libmanan from the Metropolitan Archdiocese of Caceres
- March 19, 1990: Canonical Erection of the Prelature of Libmanan
- March 19, 1990: Episcopal Ordination of Most Rev. Prospero N. Arellano, D.D.
- July 2, 2008: Canonical Possession and Installation of the second bishop-prelate, Most Rev. Jose R. Rojas Jr. D.D.
- March 25, 2009: Elevated to the rank of a diocese.
- June 19, 2009: Canonical Erection of the Diocese of Libmanan.
- December 9, 2014: Silver Jubilee of the See of Libmanan.

== Ordinaries ==
No	Name	In office	Coat of arms
1.	Bishop Prospero Nale Arellano	December 9, 1989 – May 19, 2008	
2.	Bishop José Rojas Rojas Jr.	May 19, 2008 – present	

== Images of The Libmanan Cathedral ==
Pictures of The Interior Of The Libmanan Cathedral

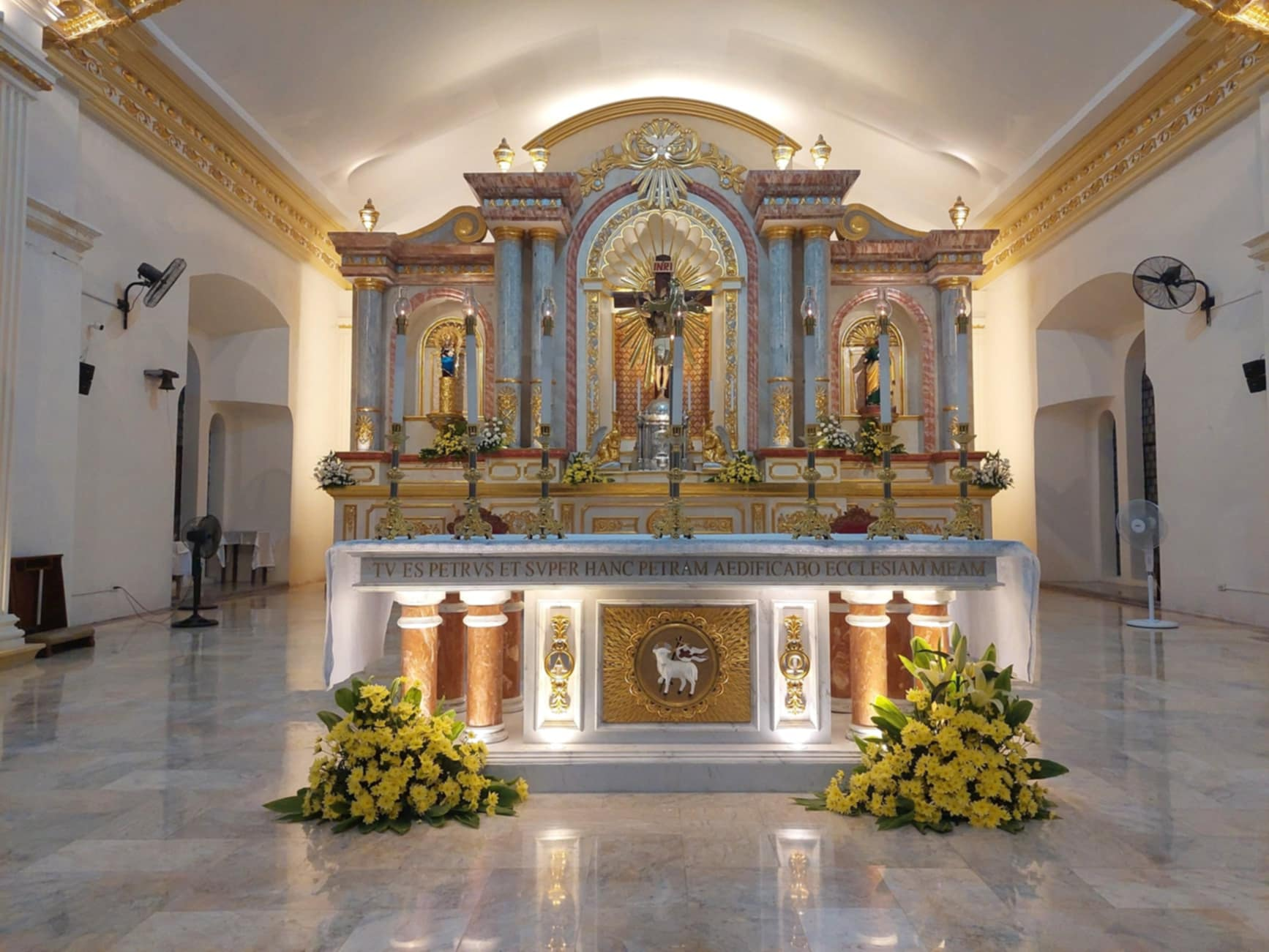
High Altar of The Libmanan Cathedral

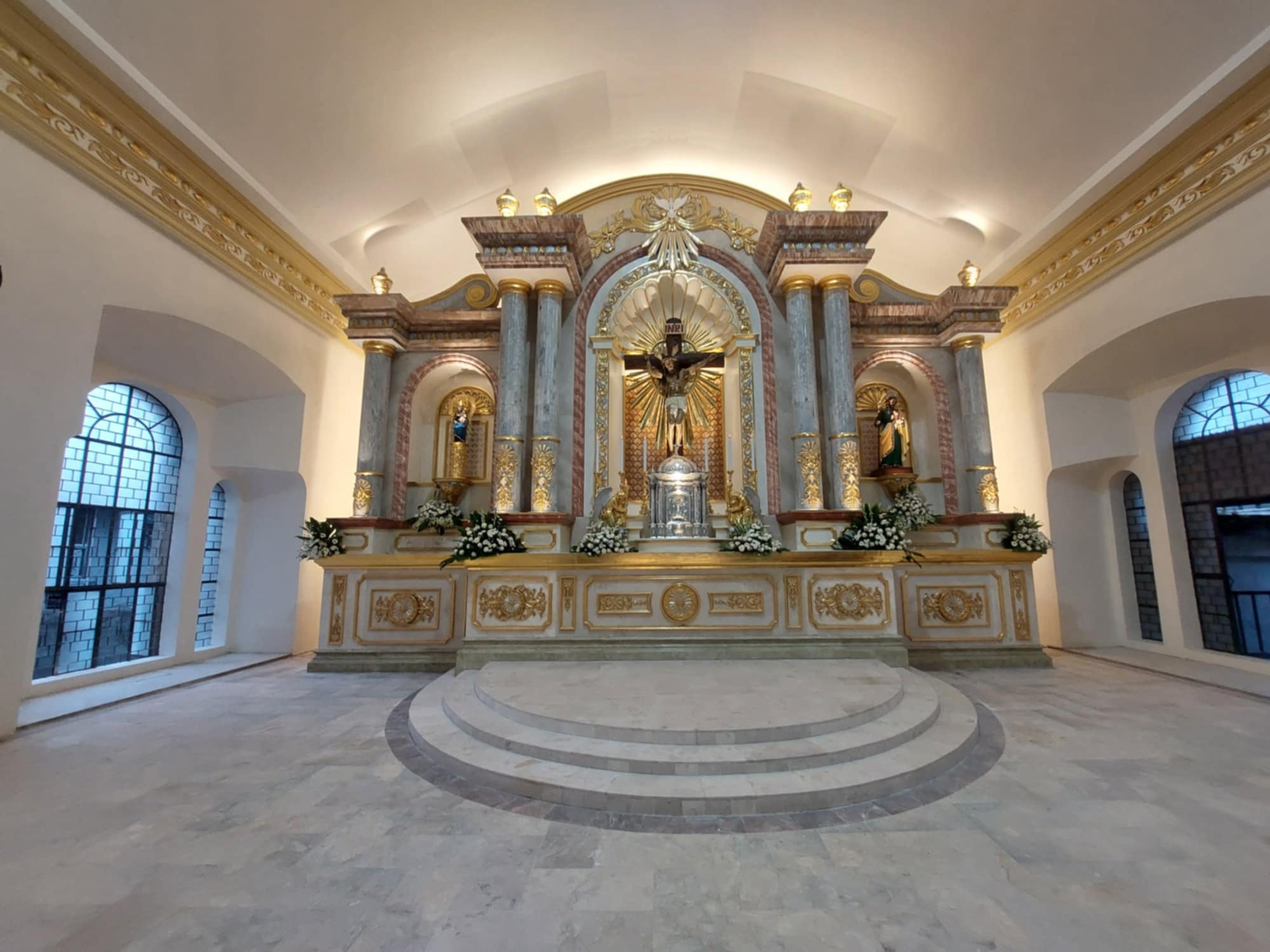
The Retablo Mayor of The Libmanan Cathedral

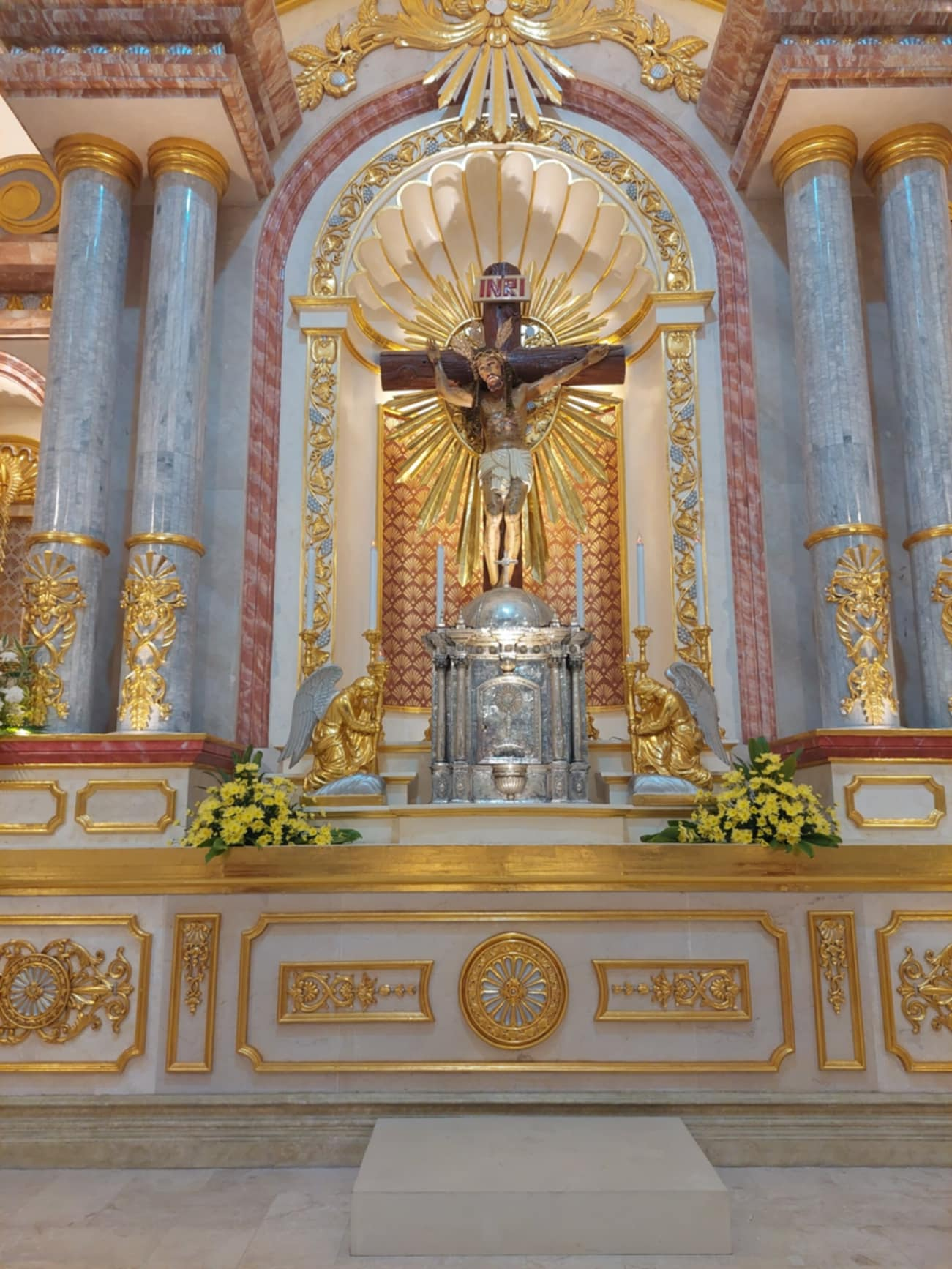
Close-up look of The Tabernacle and Crucifix of The Libmanan Cathedral

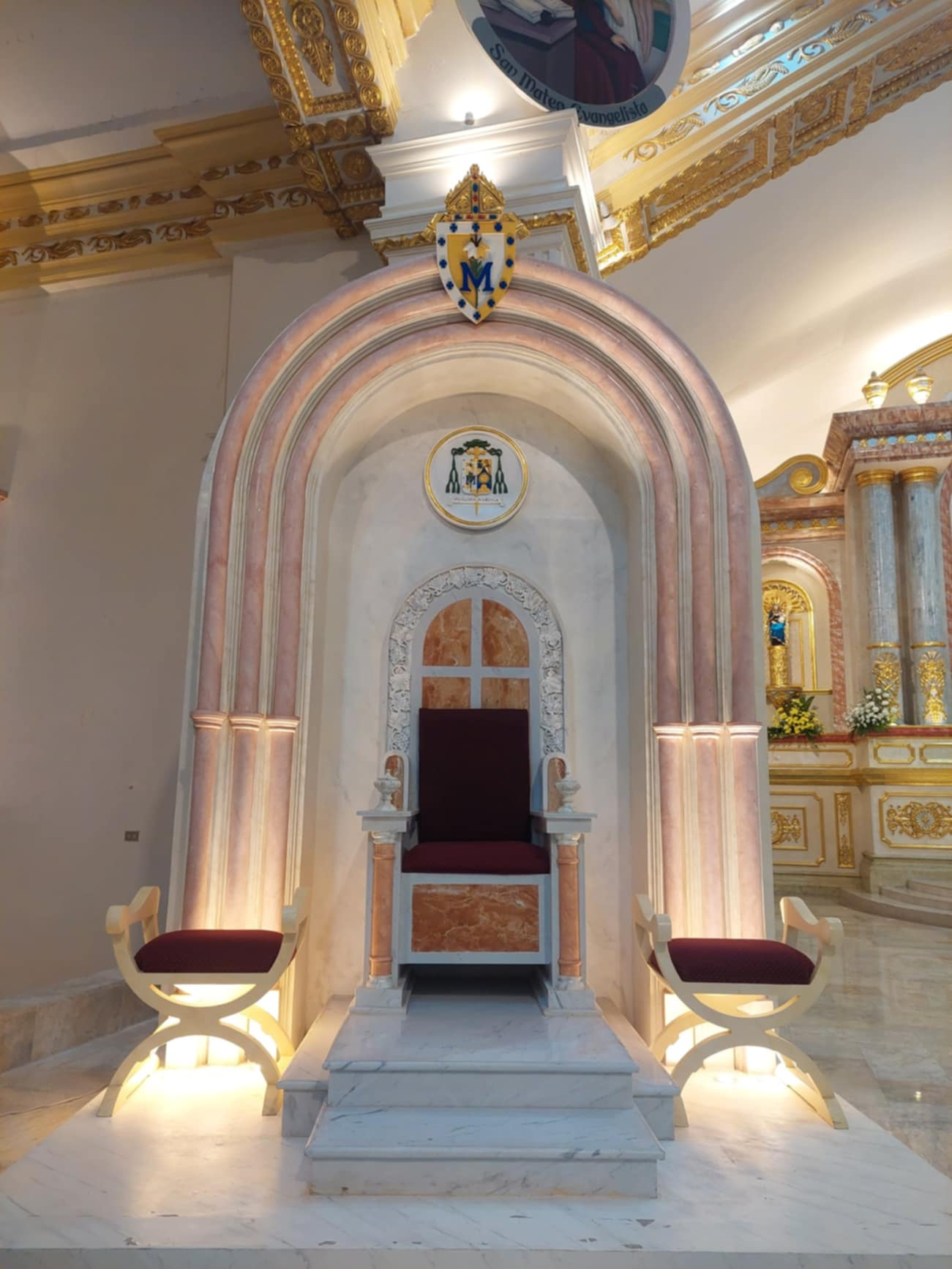
Cathedra Of The Libmanan Cathedral

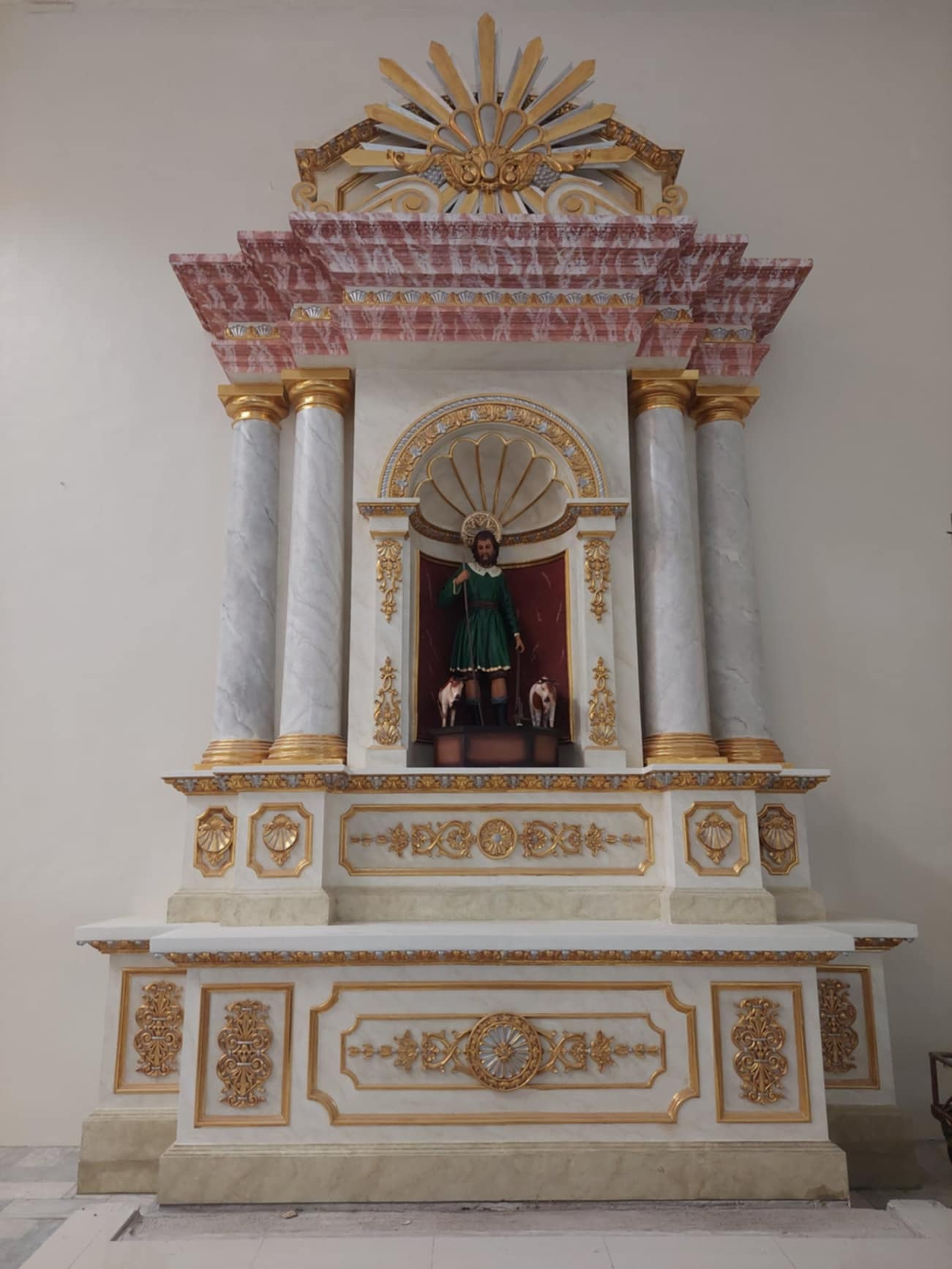
Retablo Minore of St Isidore of Seville, Secondary Patron saint of The Libmanan Cathedral Parish

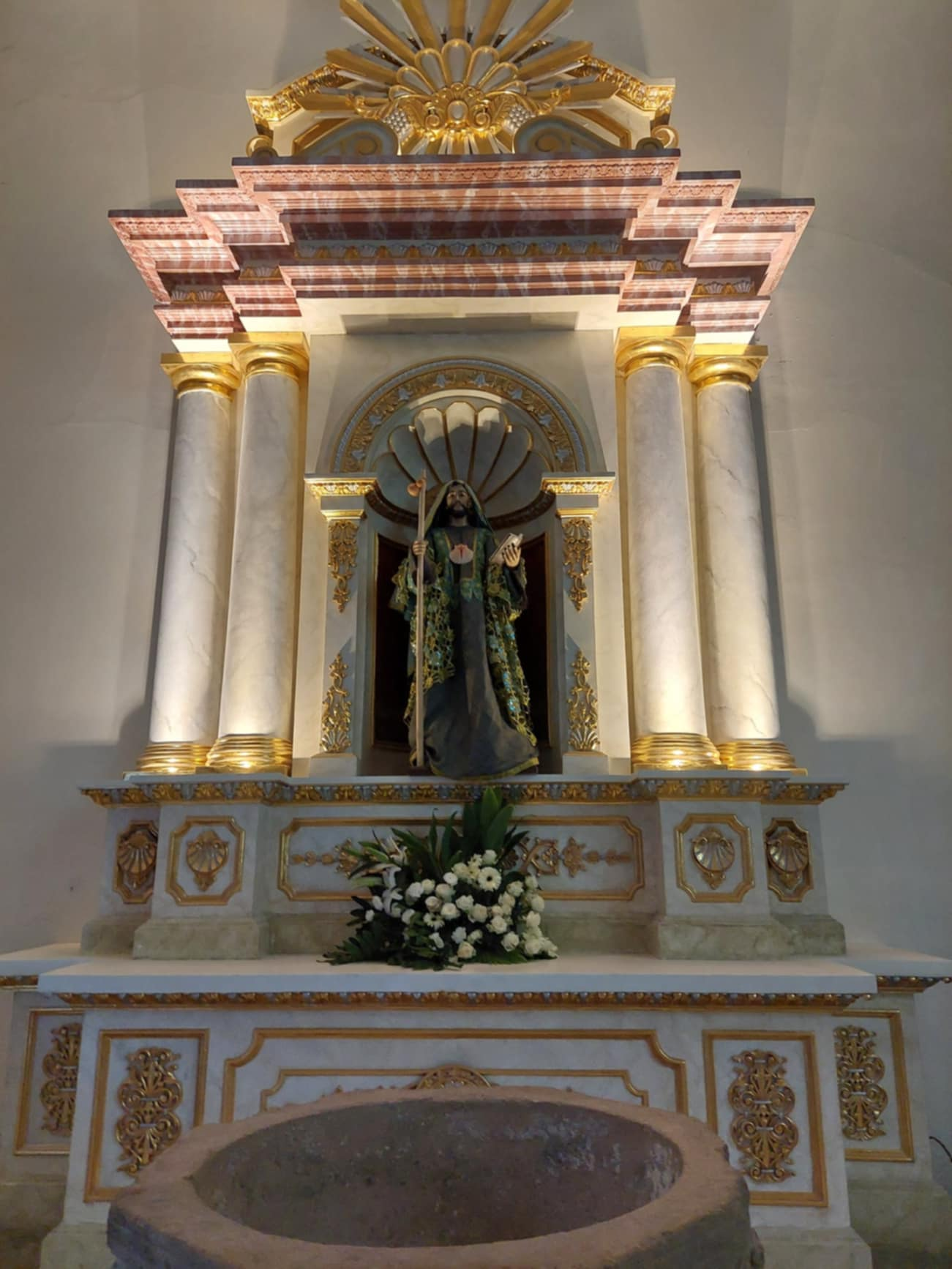
The Retablo Minore of St James The Greater, Patron of The Libmanan Cathedral Parish

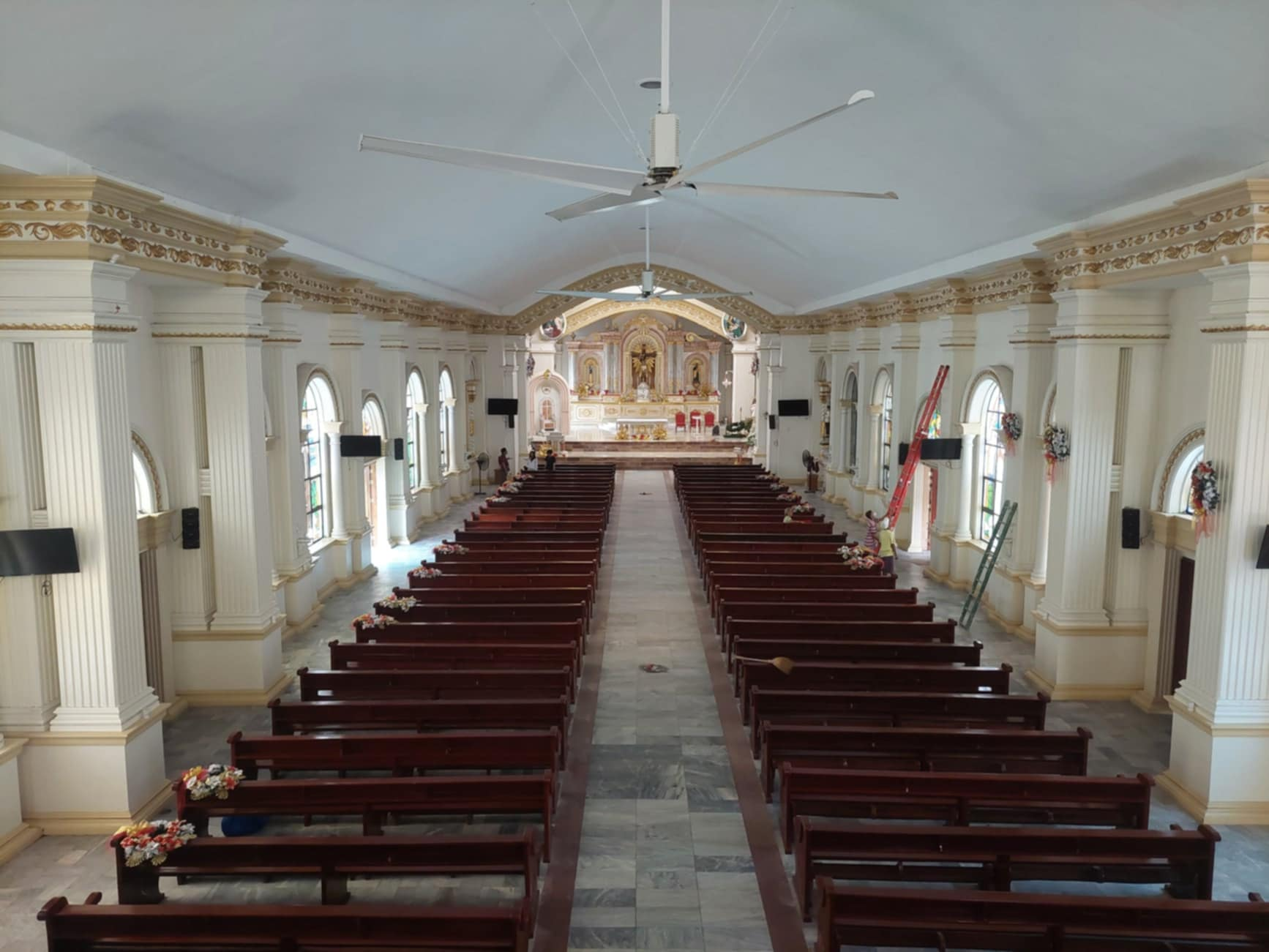
The Nave of The Libmanan Cathedral

== Seminaries ==
- Saint Benedict Diocesan Seminary
  - Maharlika Highway, Del Pilar, San Fernando, Camarines Sur
- Saint Joseph Pre-Seminary
  - Sto. Dominggo, Milaor, Camarines Sur
- St. James the Greater Minor Seminary
  - Station Church Site, Libmanan, Camarines Sur
