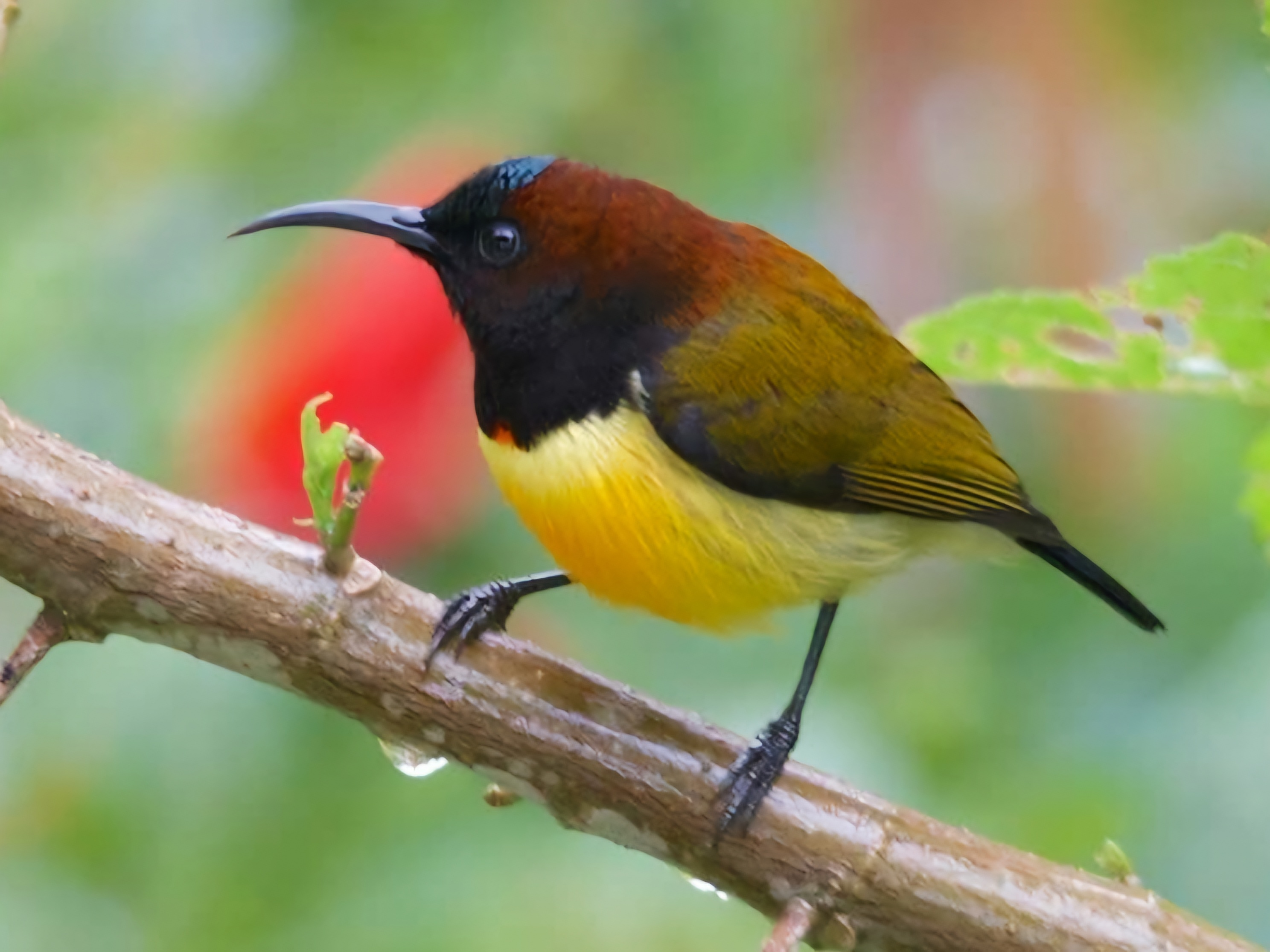
- Male ssp. daphoenonota
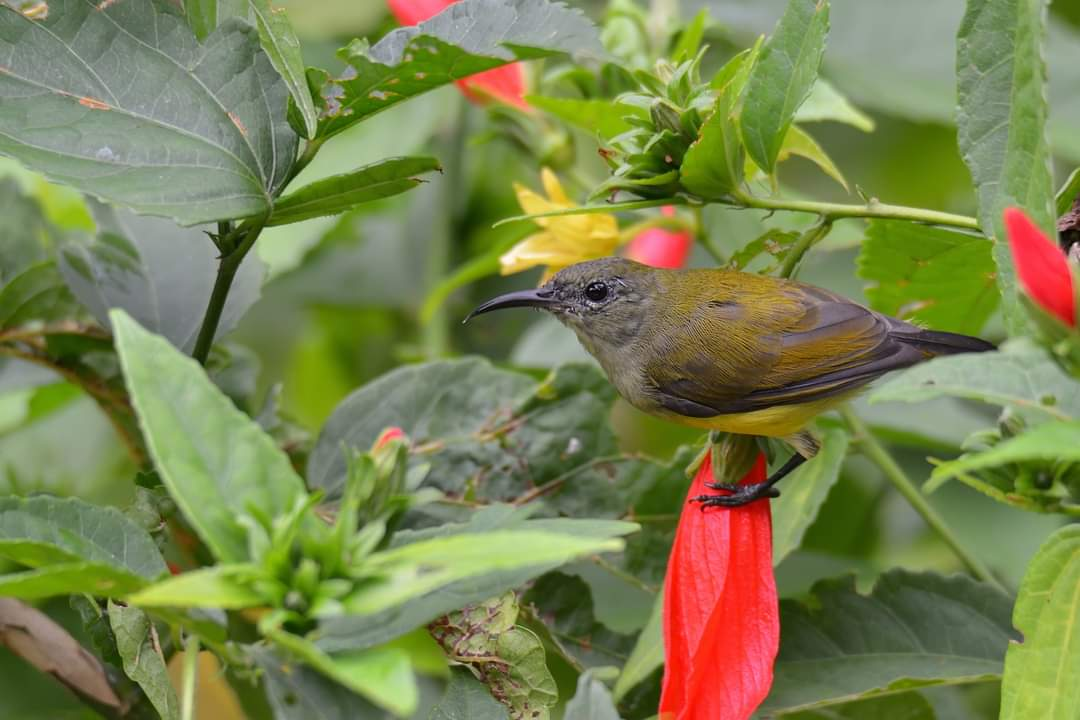
- Female ssp. daphoenonota

Conservation status
- Least Concern (IUCN 3.1)

Scientific classification
- Kingdom: Animalia
- Phylum: Chordata
- Class: Aves
- Order: Passeriformes
- Family: Nectariniidae
- Genus: Aethopyga
- Species: A. guimarasensis

Binomial name
- Aethopyga guimarasensis (Steere, 1890)
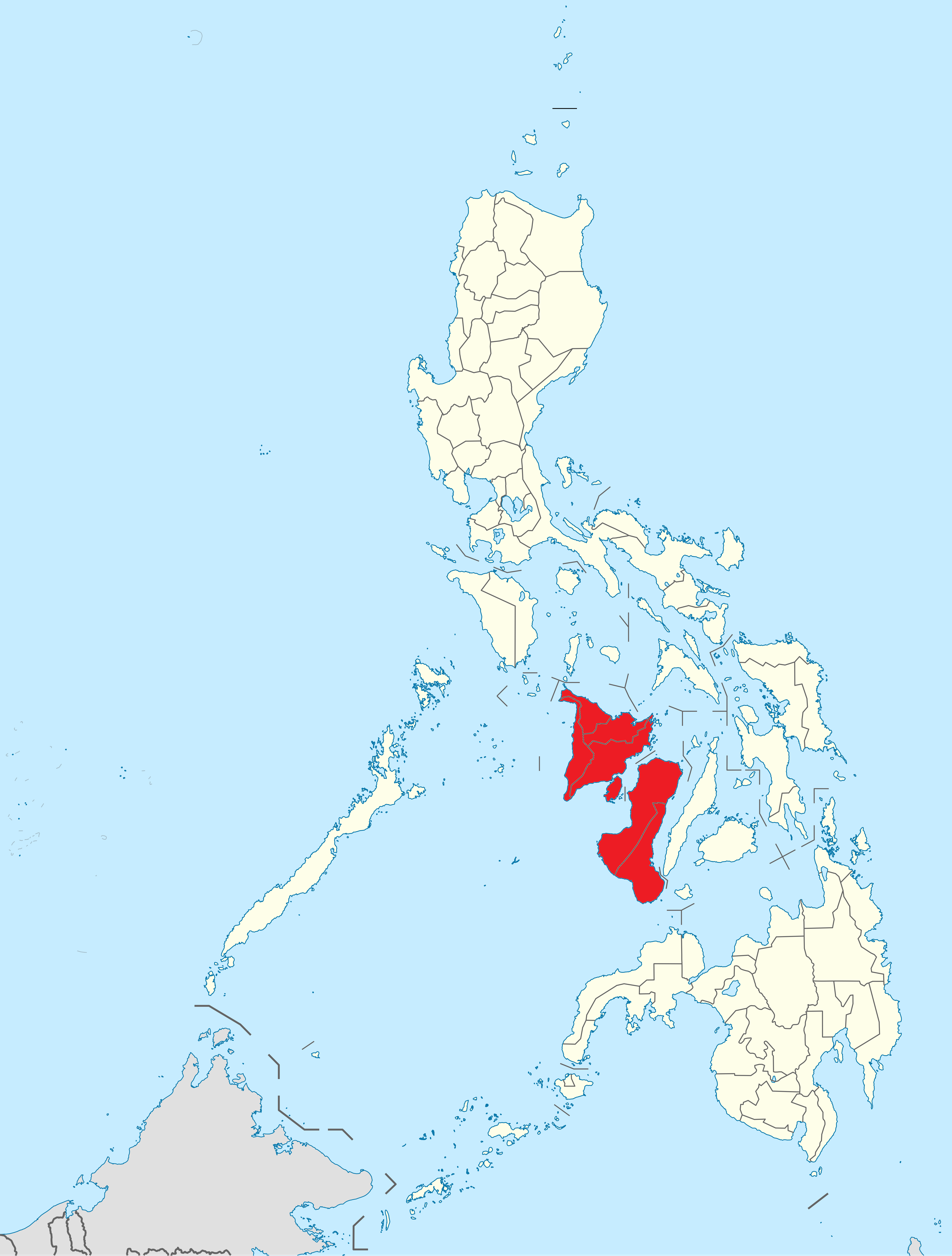

= Maroon-naped sunbird =

Species of bird

The maroon-naped sunbird (Aethopyga guimarasensis) is a species of bird in the family Nectariniidae. It is endemic to the Philippines found on the islands of Negros Island, Panay and Guimaras. Its natural habitat is tropical moist lowland forests.

== Description and taxonomy ==
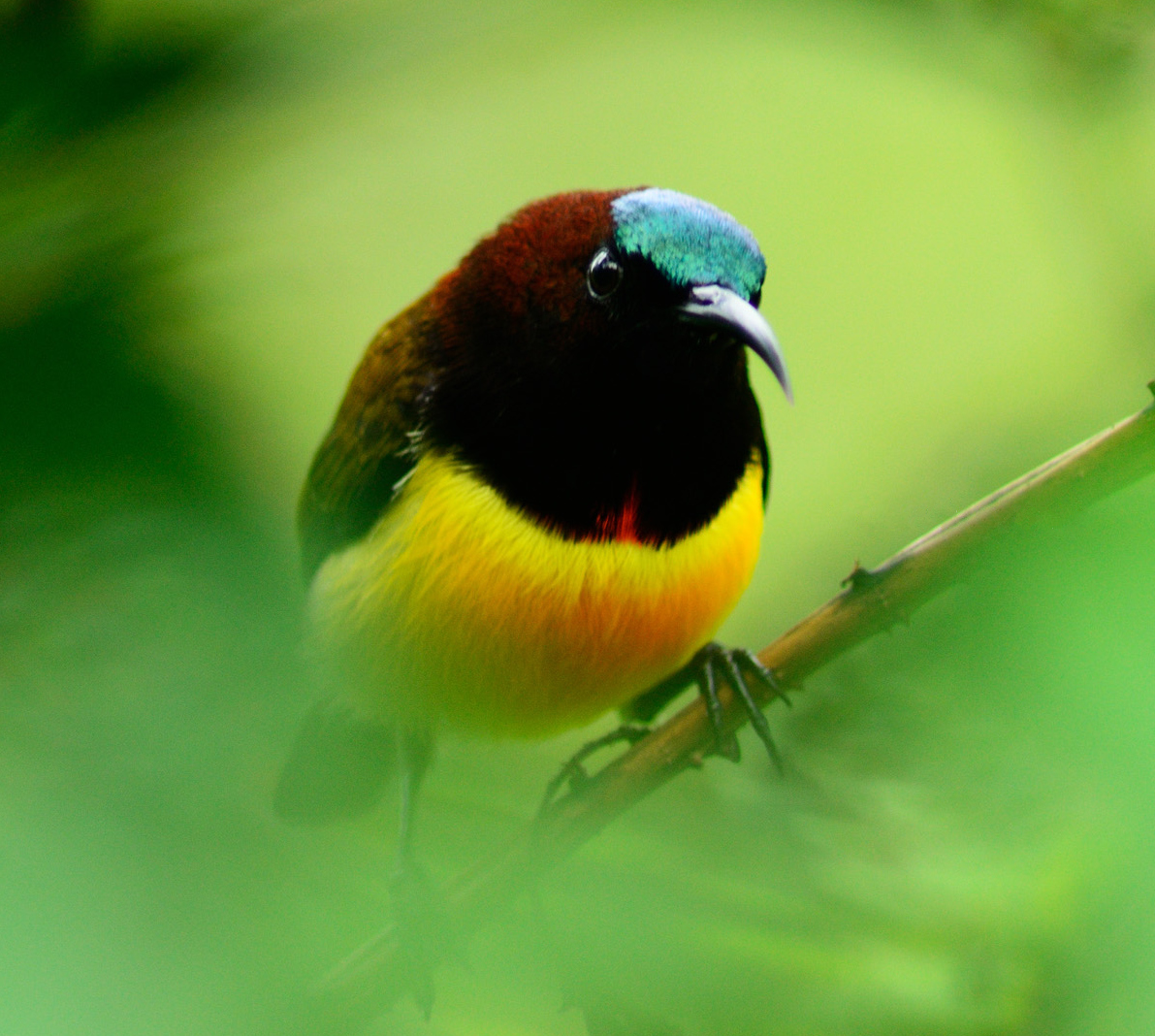
A male ssp. daphoenonota

Described on Ebird as "A small bird of forest and edge from the lowlands to low elevations in the mountains on the western Visayas. Has a fairly long and slightly curved bill, yellow underparts, and olive wings. Male has a black face, throat, and chest, with a purple mustache stripe and a green crown. Male is similar to Olive-backed Sunbird, but has a red spot on the chest and reddish coloration on the upper back and back of the head. The drab female resembles the female Handsome Sunbird, but lacks the yellow rump. Voice includes a jumbled, high-pitched song and a slightly wheezy, high-pitched "tsee-tsee-tsee."

It was previously conspecific with the Flaming sunbird but it differs in molecular genetics, a much glossier crown, the eponymous maroon nape and a much brighter yellow belly.

=== Subspecies ===
Two subspecies are recognized:

- A. g. guimarasensis – Found on Panay and Guimaras
- A. g. daphoenonota – Found on Negros; More maroon on its nape and mantle and has more orange on chest than nominate.

== Ecology and behavior ==
Not much is directly known about its diet but often seen feeding on nectar of the non-native Hibiscus and pressumed to feed on insects and even seeds. Typically seen alone or in pairs but also joins mixed-species flocks

== Habitat and conservation ==
Its natural habitat is moist tropical primary and secondary forest up to 1,350 meters above sea level.

International Union for Conservation of Nature has assessed this bird as least-concern species but with a declining population.

This species' main threat is habitat loss with wholesale clearance of forest habitats as a result of logging, agricultural conversion and mining activities occurring within the range. Negros Island is one of the most deforested areas in the country due to its sugar industry and logging with most of its forests being totally lost before the 21st century. Forest cover on Negros and Panay is just 3% and 6% respectively and these figures are still declining.

It occurs in a few protected areas within Mt. Kanlaon Natural Park and Northern Negros Natural Park; however, protection and enforcement against deforestation is lax. It also occurs in the proposed Central Panay Mountain Range Park which contains the largest block of remaining forest in the Western Visayas, and the tourist destination of Twin Lakes (Mount Talinis). Both sites benefit from conservation funding but are still under threat by deforestation.
