= Libmanan Caves National Park =

National park in the Philippines

- IUCN category III (natural monument or feature)
- Location within Philippines
- Location: Camarines Sur, Philippines
- Nearest city: Naga, Camarines Sur, Philippines
- Coordinates: 13°41′N 122°59′E
- Area: 19.4 hectares (48 acres)
- Established: February 6, 1934
- Governing body: Department of Environment and Natural Resources

Libmanan Caves National Park is a protected area of the Philippines located in Barangay Sigamot in the municipality of Libmanan, Camarines Sur in Bicol Region. It is centered on the massive 2,856-meter-long Colapnitan Cave, the tenth longest cave in the Philippines. The park itself covers a total area of 19.4 hectares across the hilly farmlands of Libmanan, known to host at least 18 more limestone caves of varying lengths, shapes and wonder. It was established in 1934 by virtue of Proclamation No. 654.

The park is famous as the habitat of thousand of bats whose guano has been gathered from the cave for decades. It is also home to swiftlets and some great long-armed spiders of the species Phrynus, known to be poisonous.

== See also ==
- List of national parks of the Philippines
