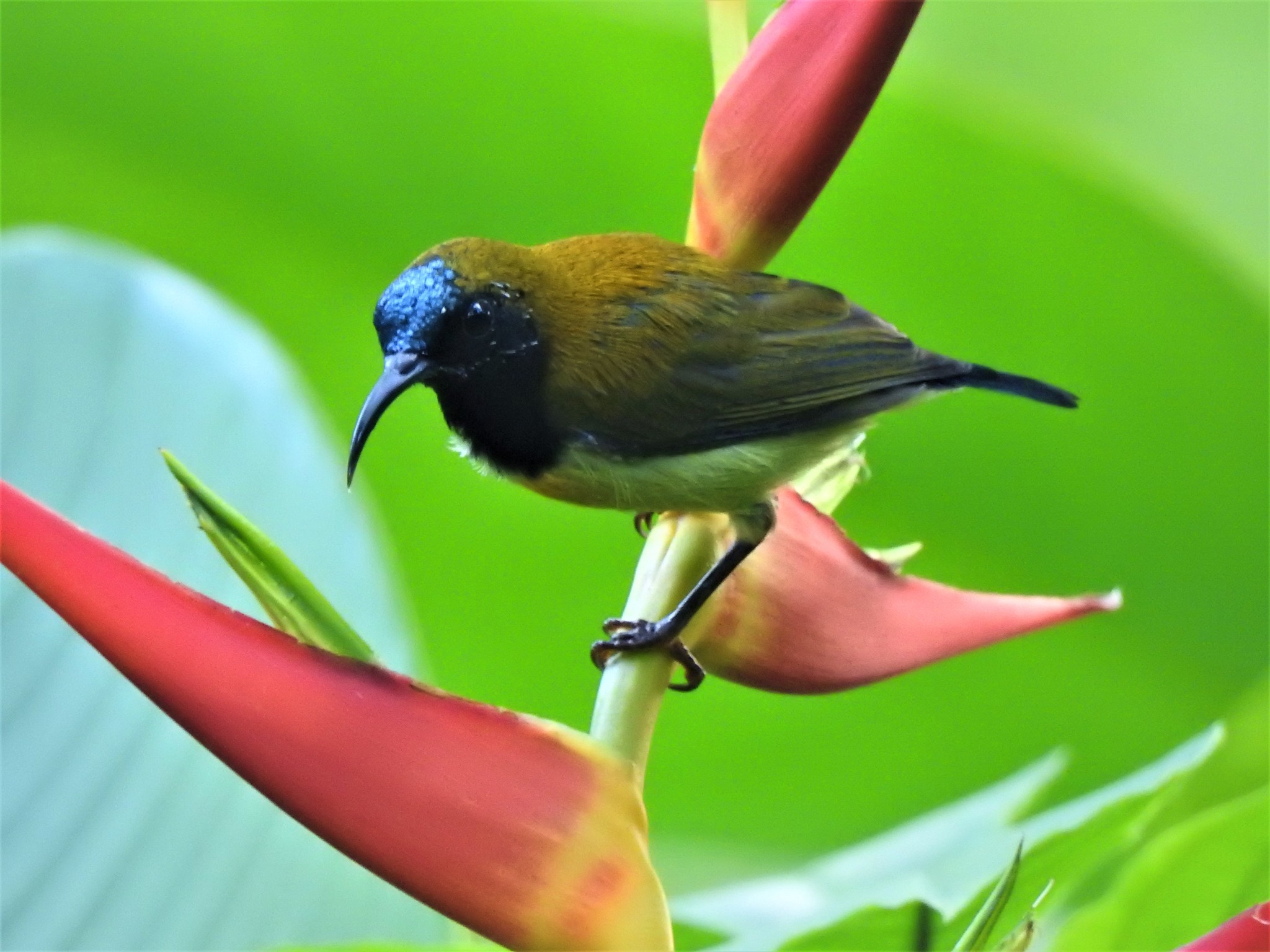
- Male
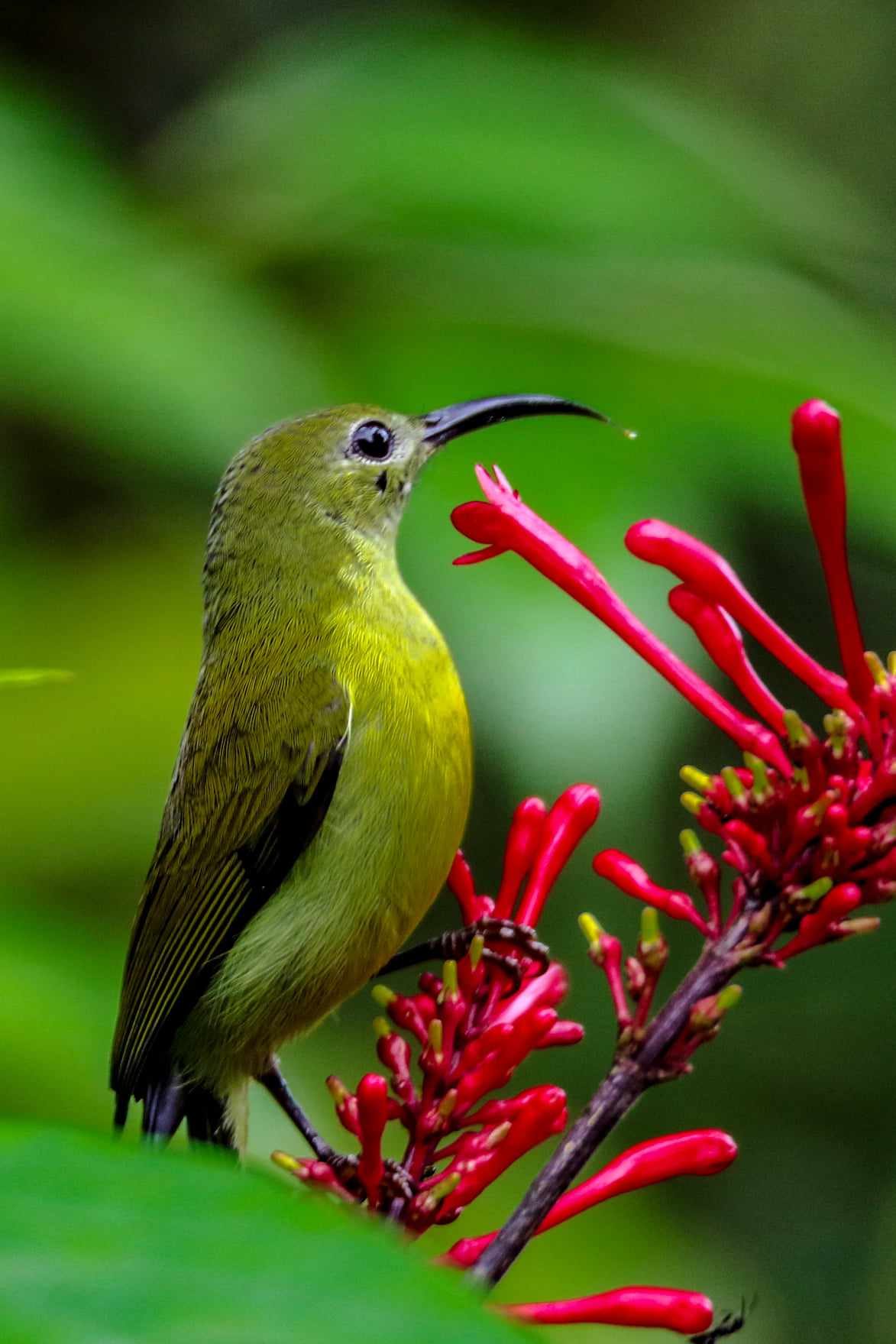
- Female

Conservation status
- Least Concern (IUCN 3.1)

Scientific classification
- Kingdom: Animalia
- Phylum: Chordata
- Class: Aves
- Order: Passeriformes
- Family: Nectariniidae
- Genus: Aethopyga
- Species: A. flagrans

Binomial name
- Aethopyga flagrans Oustalet, 1876

= Flaming sunbird =

Species of bird

The flaming sunbird (Aethopyga flagrans) is a species of bird in the family Nectariniidae. It is endemic to the northern Philippines found on the islands of Luzon and Catanduanes. Its natural habitat is tropical moist lowland forests. It was formerly conspecific with the Maroon-naped sunbird.

== Description and taxonomy ==
Described on Ebird as "A small bird of forest and edge from the lowlands to low elevations in the mountains on Luzon and Catanduanes. Has a fairly long, curved bill, olive upperparts, and a yellowish upper belly. Male has a blackish tail, face, throat, and chest, with green iridescence on the forecrown and purple on the throat. Similar to Olive-backed Sunbird, but has a red chest spot, an orange wash on the upper belly, and no white outer tail feathers. Female has a gray throat and lacks the yellow brow. Voice includes a high-pitched double-noted call, "chik-chik!"

It was previously conspecific with the Maroon-naped sunbird but it differs in molecular genetics, a less glossy crown, the a greenih instead of maroon nape and duller yellow belly.

=== Subspecies ===
This species is now monotypic but two subspecies were formerly recognized:

- A. f. flagrans – Found on Northeast Luzon
- A. f. decolor – Found South Luzon and Catanduanes;

Subspecies weakly differentiated and have been synonymized.

== Ecology and behavior ==
Not much is directly known about its diet but often seen feeding on nectar of the non-native Hibiscus and pressumed to feed on insects and even seeds. Typically seen alone or in pairs but also joins mixed-species flocks

== Habitat and conservation status ==
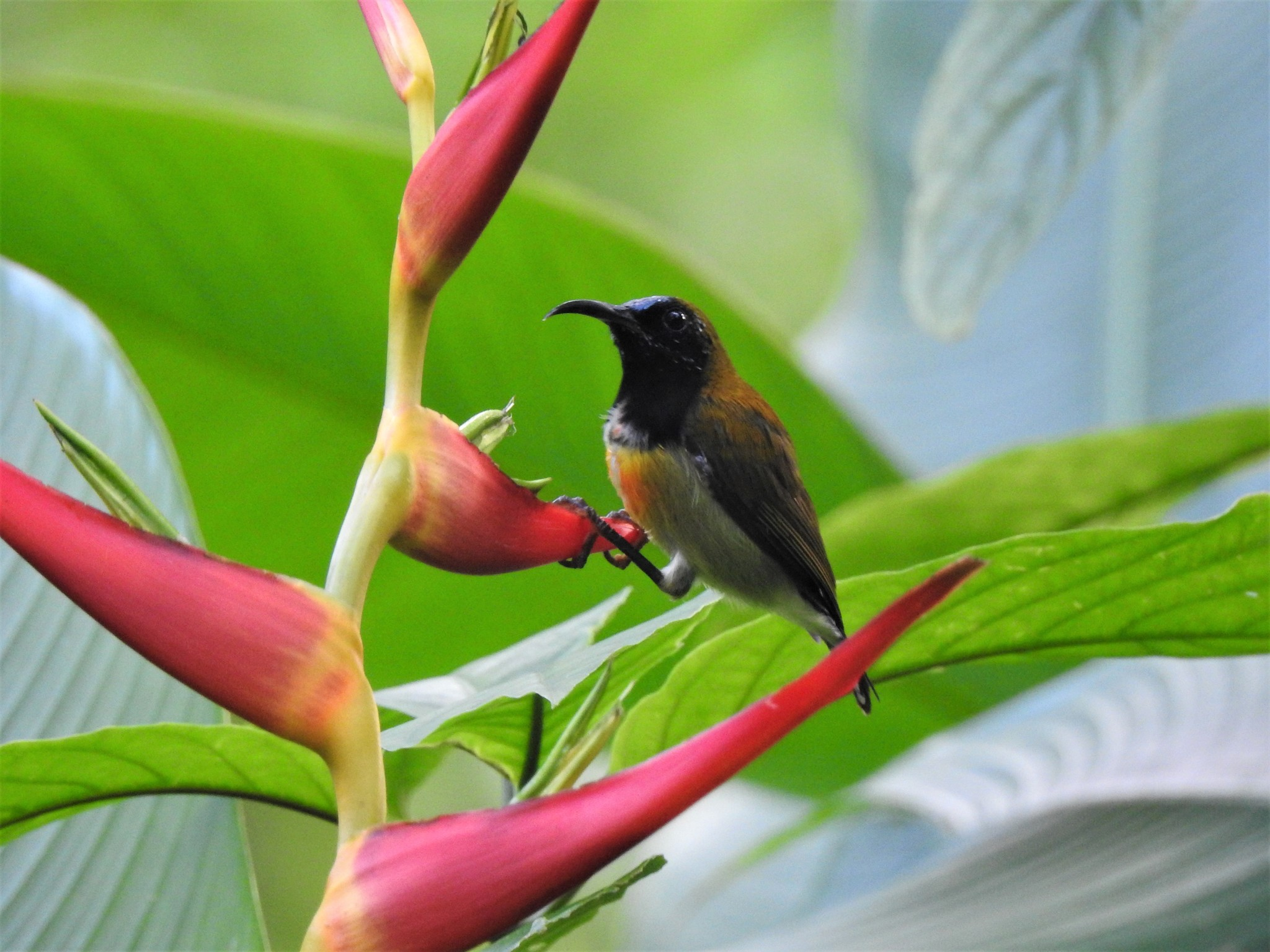

Its natural habitat is moist tropical primary and secondary forest up to 1,350 meters above sea level.

The IUCN has classified the species as being of Least Concern where it is said to be locally common. However, the population is believed to be declining due to deforestation from land conversion, Illegal logging and slash-and-burn farming.

It is found in multiple protected areas such as Mount Banahaw, Mount Makiling, Mount Isarog, Bataan National Park and Northern Sierra Madre Natural Park but like all areas in the Philippines, protection is lax and deforestation and hunting continues despite this protection on paper.
