= Pasacao =

Municipality in Camarines Sur, Philippines

- Municipality
- Municipality of Pasacao
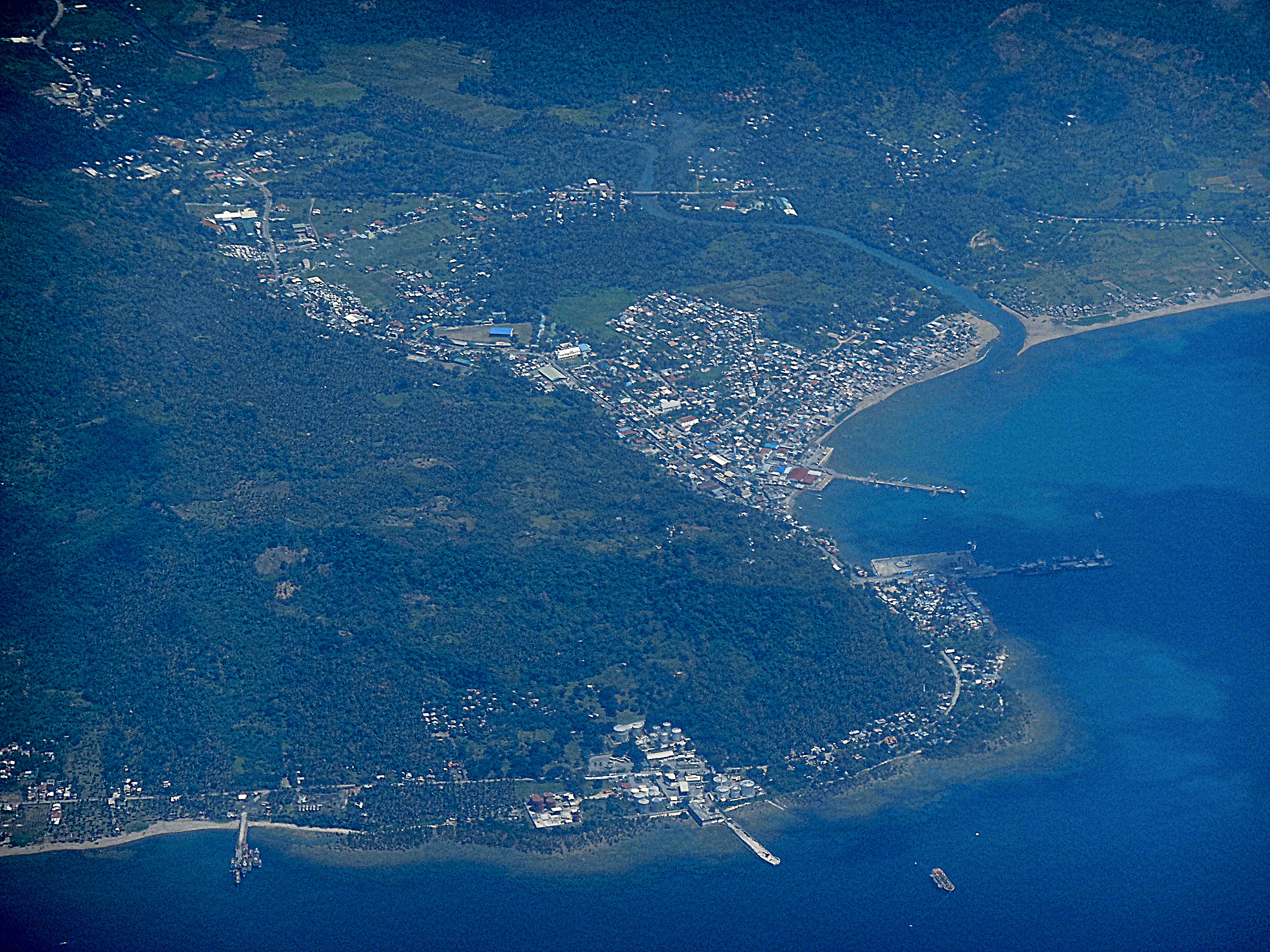
- Aerial shot of Pasacao with its port and oil depot

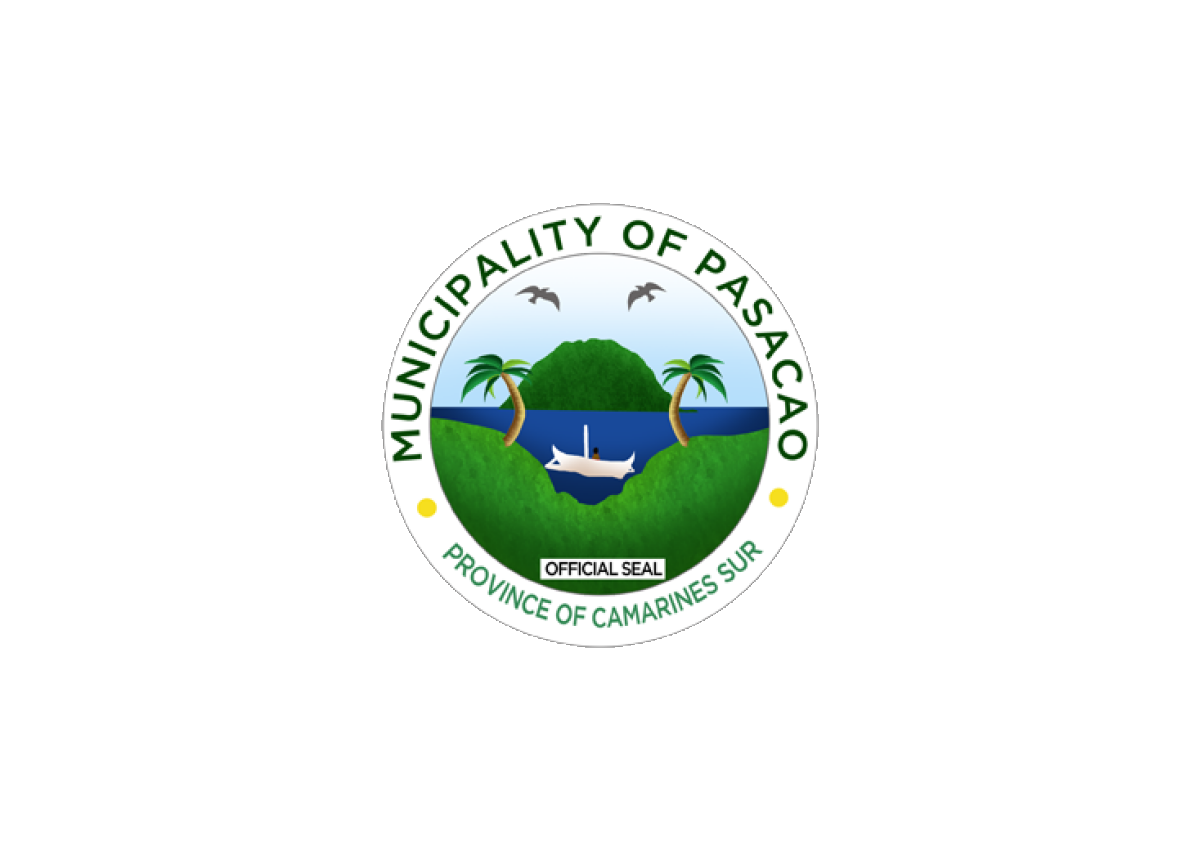
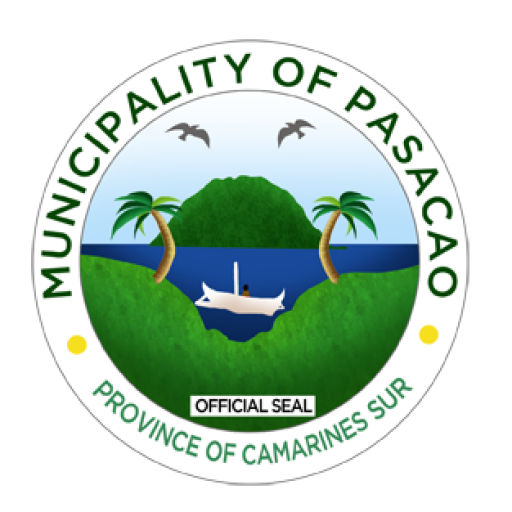
- Flag Seal
- Nickname: Summer Capital of Camarines Sur
- Motto(s): HATAW Pasacao, Give your Best
- Map of Camarines Sur with Pasacao highlighted
- Interactive map of Pasacao
- Location within the Philippines
- Coordinates: 13°30′37″N 123°02′31″E
- Country: Philippines
- Region: Bicol Region
- Province: Camarines Sur
- District: 2nd district
- Founded: 1872
- Barangays: 19 (see Barangays)

Government
  - Type: Sangguniang Bayan
  - Mayor: Niño A. Tayco
  - Vice Mayor: Jorge R. Bengua
  - Representative: Luigi Villafuerte
  - Municipal Council: Members: Maryol Tayco; Randy U. Latosa; Melinda T. Sambajon; Rose Bee Tolentino; Carlo Bañas; Khristian Obordo; Mark Anthony Bas; Junard De Alday
  - Electorate: 32,413 voters (2025)

Area
  - Total: 149.54 km^{2} (57.74 sq mi)
- Elevation: 36 m (118 ft)
- Highest elevation (Mount Bernacci): 756 m (2,480 ft)
- Lowest elevation (Ragay Gulf): 0 m (0 ft)

Population (2024 census)
  - Total: 50,708
  - Density: 339.09/km^{2} (878.25/sq mi)
  - Households: 11,971
- Demonym: Pasaqueño

Economy
  - Income class: 1st municipal income class
  - Poverty incidence: 33.06% (2023)
  - Revenue: ₱ 278 million (2024)
  - Assets: ₱ 870.6 million (2024)
  - Expenditure: ₱ 242.8 million (2024)
  - Liabilities: ₱ 283.2 million (2024)

Service provider
  - Electricity: Camarines Sur 1 Electric Cooperative (CASURECO 1)
  - Water: Pasacao Water District (PAWADI)
  - Telecommunications: General Telephone System Incorporated (GTSI)
- Time zone: UTC+8 (PST)
- ZIP code: 4417
- PSGC: 0501727000
- IDD : area code: +63 (0)54
- Native languages: Central Bikol; Tagalog
- Major religions: Roman Catholicism
- Feast date: August 30
- Catholic diocese: Diocese of Libmanan
- Patron saint: Saint Rose of Lima
- Website: pasacao.gov.ph

Pasacao (/pɑːsəˈkaʊ/), officially the Municipality of Pasacao (Central Bikol: Banwaan kan Pasacao; Tagalog: Bayan ng Pasacao), is a 1st class municipality in the province of Camarines Sur, Philippines. According to the 2024 census, it has a population of 50,708 people. The area is noted for its brown sand beaches and is sometimes referred to as the "Summer Capital of Camarines Sur.

During the Spanish colonization in the 16th century, a settlement surrounded a port in what is now Pasacao, serving as a primary embarkation point in Camarines Sur and the only sea link to Manila. This strategic location supported commerce and trade across the archipelago.

Colloquially, "Pasacao" refers to this former settlement, which is still recognized separately as the modern town center housing government and business hubs. The settlement was designated as a town in 1854 and expanded to incorporate neighboring barrios, leading to the establishment of a municipality during the American colonial period in the early 20th century.

== Etymology ==
The town's name is derived from the Spanish-Tagalog portmanteau Pasa-Ikaw (English: Pass it on). This is because dock guards stationed at the Pasacao Port would regularly issue directions to passengers by shouting "Pasa ikaw, Pasa ikaw." Passengers mistook the phrase for the town's name, Pasacao.

== History ==
Early European travelers noted that Pasacao, located at the present-day town center, was seen as separate from nearby barangays like Dalupaon and Tinalmud. This suggests that these areas were independent villages before being formally organized. The current municipality of Pasacao, which now includes all its barangays, was officially established during the American colonial period, while the individual barangays existed earlier as separate communities.

=== Spanish colonization ===
From 1585 to the 19th century, Pasacao served as a crucial defense port against Moro pirate incursions. The raid in Caranan on October 4, 1779, is an example. Pasacao and 9 other towns and two missions were entirely destroyed. In 1823, the town had an estimated population of only 200 people due to frequent attacks. To defend Pasacao against these raids, Alcalde Jacinto Rodriguez Morales contributed material for a balwark. The fortification of Pasacao in 1848, which included Cabusao in Camarines Sur, Pantao (now Libon), and Donsol in Sorsogon, was motivated by these attacks.

Between 1609 and 1616, during the governor generalship of Juan de Silva, two galleons, the Nuestra Senora de Guadalupe and Angel dela Guardia, were built in Barangay Dalupaon, as well as the Astillero de Dalupaon (English: Dalupaon Shipyard). Guadalupe was vital in the galleon commerce between Manila and Acapulco, as well as the defense of the Philippines against the Dutch at the Battle of Playa Honda.

In 1627, an attempt was made to establish a canal linking a river in Pasacao (Note: The river mentioned is not specified, but it could be the Tinalmud River, given its proximity to the Bicol River.) to the Bicol River, which would have connected the town to Nueva Caceres (now Naga). However, the project was abandoned due to concerns about the high costs involved. There was also uncertainty over whether the small boats that would utilize the canal would justify the expense, and fears arose that seawater intrusion might threaten the town's rice fields.

=== Japanese occupation ===
In World War II, the Tangcong Vaca Guerilla Unit, based near Mount Bernacci, carried out significant operations against Japanese forces. Notably, after Japanese ships docked at Pasacao Pier, they were bombed as part of the guerrilla resistance, marking Pasacao’s involvement in the region’s wartime activities.

The Six Daughters of Charity arrived in Pasacao to establish Naga's first regular girls' school, Universidad de Santa Isabel.

=== Post-colonization ===
On July 20, 1966, a major fire devastated the commercial and residential center of Pasacao. The blaze, ignited by sparks from a chimney, swept through approximately 13 blocks, resulting in damage estimated at PHP 3 to 4 million. The fire left about 700 families, or 3,000 individuals, homeless. Key structures, including the mayor's residence and a rural bank were destroyed.

Local firefighting efforts were hampered by inadequate equipment, and looting occurred amidst the chaos. In response, President Marcos allocated PHP 10,000 in initial aid, and Governor Armando B. Cledera provided PHP 10,000 worth of goods and materials. Various organizations, including the Philippine Red Cross and the Naga City Filipino-Chinese Chamber of Commerce, contributed food and supplies to support the affected residents.

== Geography ==
Pasacao is located on the northwest coast of Camarines Sur. It shares its northwestern border with Libmanan, marked by Mount Bernacci, while San Fernando lies to the east and Pamplona to the north. The town center is nestled in a valley between the Ragay Hills, offering direct access to the Bicol Plains. Pasacao's 29.56 kilometres (18.37 mi) coastline lies on the southern part of the municipality, facing the Ragay Gulf, which is part of the Sibuyan Sea.

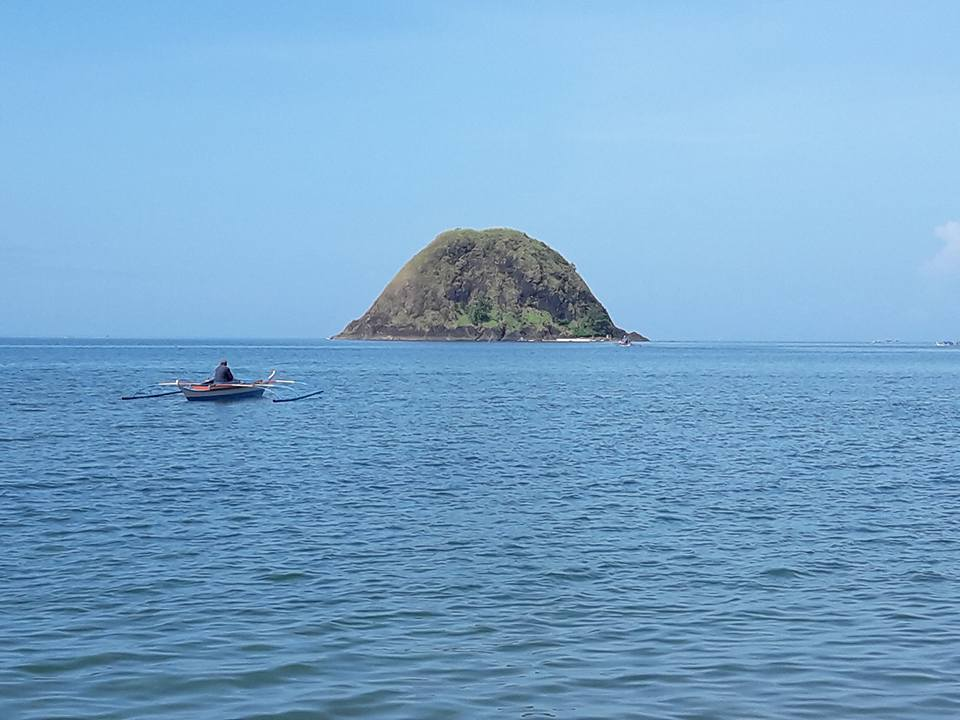
Daruanak Island

It covers an area of approximately 149.54 square kilometres (57.74 sq mi). The municipality is characterized by flat lowlands in the north and east, consisting of silt, and mountainous regions in the west. The western area mainly features rolling hills that are part of the highlands surrounding the Ragay Gulf, with the terrain primarily consisting of limestones, sandstones, and marls. The town's topography is characterized by steep slopes, with elevations ranging from sea level to over 400 metres (1,300 ft) above sea level. The highest point in the town is Mount Bernacci, which stands at 756 metres (2,480 ft) above sea level.

Pasacao is characterized by several rivers, notably including the Caranan, Cagbunini, Itulan, Balogo, and Tinalmud Rivers. All these waterways flow into the Ragay Gulf. Among them, the Tinalmud River is the longest, extending approximately 10.5 kilometres (6.5 mi).

Pasacao's coastline extends approximately 22 kilometres (14 mi). Its brown sand beaches, are used for activities like swimming, snorkeling, and fishing. Balogo Beach, the most notable beach, is near Daruanak Island, the town's landmark and one of the major features of the official seal.

=== Biodiversity & resources ===
Pasacao is home to 73 species across 64 genera and 41 families, including 10 mammals, 53 birds, 4 reptiles, and 6 amphibians.

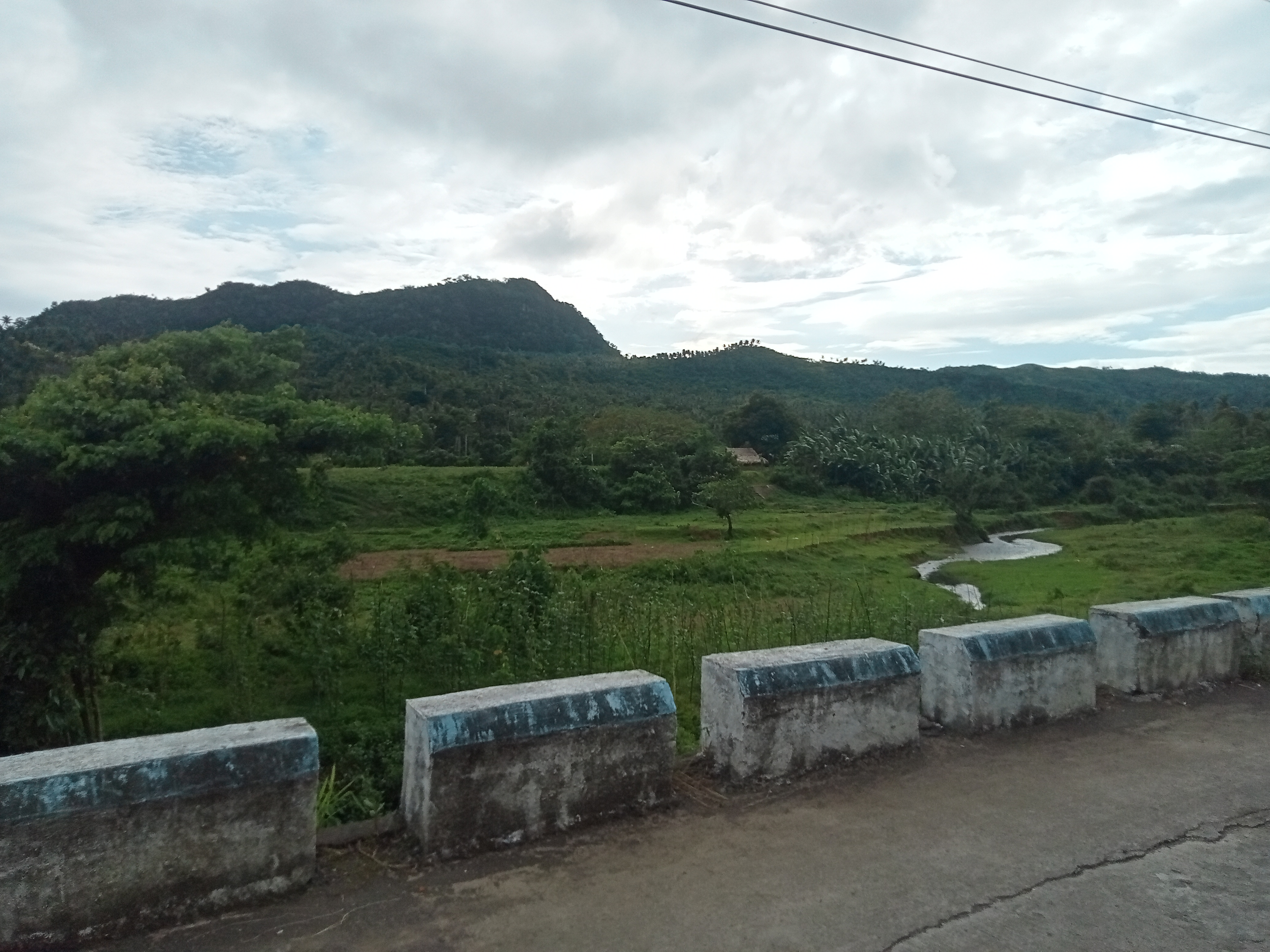
Mount Tigbi

Suminabang Cave, located in Caranan near Dalupaon, hosts insectivorous species such as the Caroline swiftlet (Aerodramus inquietus) and the Philippine forest roundleaf bat (Hipposideros obscurus). Another cave in Bahay, situated on the slopes of Mt. Tigbi, features a distinctive dog-head shaped entrance and is accessible after a one-hour hike. This cave is part of a limestone mountain range that forms the natural boundary between Bahay and Caranan.

Coastal Pasacao is abundant in marine species, including sea urchins, seaweeds, shellfish, and sea cucumbers. Indo-Pacific Bottlenose dolphins (Tursiops aduncus) and Spotted dolphins (Stenella attenuata) have been sighted in the town's coastal waters.

On August 9, 1993, a fish sanctuary and marine reserve were established under Municipal Ordinance No. 93-007, covering 32 hectares in Calibayan, Dalupan, and 112 hectares in Sarimao, Caranan. The reserve includes a site in Suminabang, Dalupaon, where a Japanese warship wreck can be seen underwater.

=== Barangays ===
Pasacao is politically subdivided into 19 barangays.

Poblacion

| Barangays | Population (2020) | |
|---|---|---|
| Antipolo | 1.78% | 953 |
| Bagong Silang | 1.03% | 550 |
| Bahay | 3.56% | 1,905 |
| Balogo | 10.82% | 5,785 |
| Caranan | 19.57% | 10,460 |
| Cuco | 3.75% | 2,004 |
| Dalupaon | 7.44% | 3,977 |
| Hubo | 1.46% | 780 |
| Itulan | 2.29% | 1,226 |
| Macad (Note: Formerly Hebrio Lourdes) | 3.41% | 1,823 |
| Odicon | 5.69% | 3,043 |
| Quitang | 5.59% | 2,991 |
| Salvacion | 1.86% | 995 |
| San Antonio | 1.15% | 613 |
| San Cirilo | 9.97% | 5,53 |
| Santa Rosa Del Norte | 7.74% | 4,136 |
| Santa Rosa Del Sur | 6.60% | 3,527 |
| Tilnac | 1.73% | 927 |
| Tinalmud | 4.55% | 2,435 |
| Total | 100% | 53,461 |

=== Climate ===
Climate data for Pasacao
| Month | Jan | Feb | Mar | Apr | May | Jun | Jul | Aug | Sep | Oct | Nov | Dec | Year |
|---|---|---|---|---|---|---|---|---|---|---|---|---|---|
| Mean maximum °F (°C) | 82 (28) | 84 (29) | 86 (30) | 88 (31) | 90 (32) | 90 (32) | 86 (30) | 88 (31) | 88 (31) | 86 (30) | 84 (29) | 84 (29) | 90 (32) |
| Mean minimum °F (°C) | 75 (24) | 73 (23) | 75 (24) | 75 (24) | 79 (26) | 79 (26) | 79 (26) | 79 (26) | 77 (25) | 77 (25) | 77 (25) | 77 (25) | 73 (23) |
| Average precipitation inches (mm) | 5.82 (147.9) | 3.56 (90.5) | 3.06 (77.8) | 3.08 (78.2) | 5.66 (143.8) | 8.31 (211.1) | 12.46 (316.4) | 10.05 (255.3) | 11.96 (303.9) | 10.10 (256.6) | 5.81 (147.7) | 8.85 (224.7) | 88.72 (2,253.9) |
| Average rainy days | 6 | 4 | 5 | 4 | 9 | 12 | 18 | 13 | 14 | 11 | 7 | 8 | 111 |
| Average ultraviolet index | 6 | 6 | 6 | 7 | 7 | 6 | 6 | 6 | 6 | 6 | 6 | 6 | 6 |
Source: World Weather Online (modeled/calculated data, not measured locally)

According to the Köppen climate classification system, Pasacao has a tropical rainforest climate. The north-east monsoon dominates the area; therefore, rainfall is evenly spread throughout the year. From October to January, the wind blows from north to east, from east to southeast from February to April, and from May to September, it blows from east to southeast. From December to May, the area is rather dry, and the rest of the year is wet. The town is occasionally affected by typhoons during the wet season, which can cause flooding and landslides in some areas.

Based on PAGASA’s Climate Projections, the temperature in Pasacao is estimated to rise ranging from 0.9 °C to 1.1 °C in year 2020, and will continue to rise in 2050 ranging from 1.8 °C to 2.2 °C. This will affect vital ecosystems such as forest, agriculture, and coastal and marine. The agricultural sector may experience loss as studies reveal that 1 °C increase in temperature causes 10% decrease in rice yield.

== Demographics ==
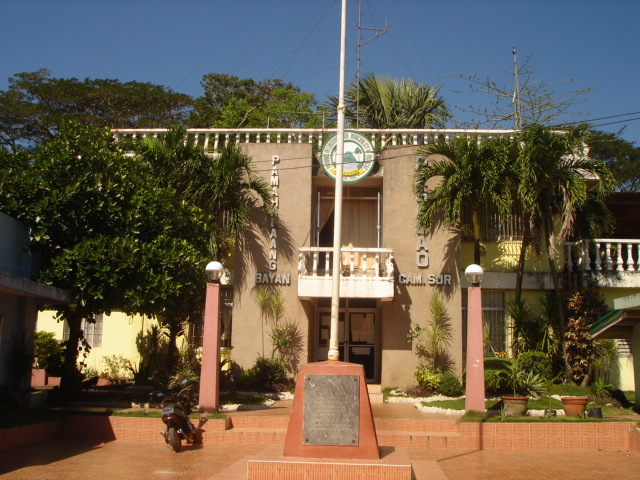
Pasacao municipal hall

In the 2024 census, the population of Pasacao was 50,708 people, with a density of 340 inhabitants per square kilometre or 880 inhabitants per square mile.

Population census of Pasacao

| Year | Pop. | ±% p.a. |
|---|---|---|
| 1903 | 2,431 | — |
| 1918 | 2,308 | −0.35% |
| 1939 | 5,594 | +4.31% |
| 1948 | 8,128 | +4.24% |
| 1960 | 14,327 | +4.84% |
| 1970 | 19,355 | +3.05% |
| 1975 | 21,809 | +2.42% |
| 1980 | 25,303 | +3.02% |

| Year | Pop. | ±% p.a. |
|---|---|---|
| 1990 | 31,960 | +2.36% |
| 1995 | 36,070 | +2.29% |
| 2000 | 38,423 | +1.36% |
| 2007 | 41,533 | +1.08% |
| 2010 | 45,946 | +3.74% |
| 2015 | 49,035 | +1.25% |
| 2020 | 53,461 | +1.84% |
| 2024 | 50,708 | −1.26% |

Source: Philippine Statistics Authority

Poverty incidence of Pasacao (%)

Source: Philippine Statistics Authority

=== Language ===
The primary language spoken in Pasacao is Bikol, specifically the Central Bikol dialect. However, many residents also speak Tagalog and English, which are the official languages of the Philippines.

=== Religion ===
Despite the presence of a single church, Saint Rose of Lima Parish, and a few chapels, Roman Catholicism is the dominant religion in the municipality. The Church of Jesus Christ of Latter-day Saints, Iglesia ni Kristo, Born Again denominations, Jehovah's Witnesses, and other Christian denominations are also present across the municipality.

== Economy ==
Pasacao’s economy is primarily driven by agriculture, which occupies approximately 59.6% of the municipality’s total land. Key activities include crop cultivation, livestock and poultry raising, and fishing, which provide the main sources of livelihood for residents. Trade and commerce are concentrated around the Public Market, the town’s main commercial hub, which attracts both local residents and visitors from neighboring areas. Its proximity to Pasacao Port further facilitates the movement of goods and contributes to local revenues.

Forestry is another important component of the local economy, with around 383 hectares of land dedicated to forest production. Industrial activity remains limited, with establishments operating across sectors such as construction, utilities, and mining. Most of these are concentrated in Barangay Santa Rosa del Sur, followed by Santa Rosa del Norte, San Cirilo, and Caranan.

Despite possessing natural and cultural resources, the municipality’s tourism sector is relatively underdeveloped. The industry primarily serves short-term or passing visitors, reflecting the limited development of tourism sites and supporting facilities.

The town was formerly included in the Metro Naga area before the designation was discontinued in 2017.

== Culture ==
Pasacao holds its annual fiesta and Pasa-Pasa Ikaw Festival on August 29–30 in honor of Saint Rose of Lima, the town's patron saint. The municipal government organizes various events, including pageant competitions, civic parades, and other activities. These festivals are key to Pasacao's cultural calendar, showcasing the town's heritage and offering opportunities for local celebration. Additionally, the Daruanak Summer Festival takes place during the summer season.

== Infrastructure ==
Pasacao is served by 21 healthcare facilities, including 19 barangay health, two clinics and the Municipal Health Office in Barangay Santa Rosa del Norte.

Solid waste management in the municipality is handled through three Materials Recovery Facilities located in Caranan, San Cirilo, and Santa Rosa del Sur, which support recycling and materials recovery.

=== Commercial and civic center ===
The Public Market in Barangay Santa Rosa del Sur serves as the main hub for trade, facilitating the sale of agricultural, fishery, and general goods for residents. Signature Park in Barangay Santa Rosa del Norte functions as a civic and recreational area, encompassing the Central Business District, an evacuation court, and an eco-park plaza. The park is also designated to host the municipal office, which is under construction.

=== Roadways ===
Pasacao is primarily accessible via the Danao-Pasacao Road, a 8.89 km (5.52 mi) road which extends from a junction with the Pan-Philippine Highway in Tambo, Pamplona, to various local road networks within the town's barangays. This road serves as the main route connecting Pasacao to surrounding areas and facilitates internal transportation. Complementing this, the 40.69 km (25.28 mi) Pasacao-Balatan Tourism Coastal Highway, developed under the Build, Build, Build program, links the municipality with neighboring towns including San Fernando, Minalabac, Bula, and Balatan, integrating 15 barangays along the route. These roadways are critical for regional connectivity, the movement of goods, and access to local services.

=== Ports ===
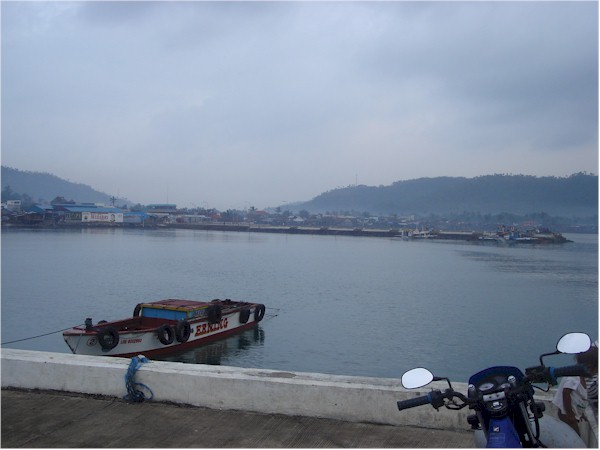
Pasacao Port

Pasacao Seaport, also known as the Port of Pasacao, locally known as Pier, is a fishing, passenger, and cargo port managed by the Philippine Ports Authority (PPA) in Camarines Sur. It is situated in Barangay Sta. Rosa del Sur. The port serves passengers traveling from Pasacao to Burias and Mobo in Masbate Province.

The nearby smaller Pasacao Fishport is primarily utilized for fishing and unloading fish, as well as pump boats and fastcrafts for short trips.

== Education ==
The Pasacao Schools District Office governs all educational institutions within the municipality. It oversees the management and operations of all private and public, from primary to secondary schools.

The municipality has several educational institutions catering to different levels of education. For elementary education, the town has 16 public schools and 2 private schools. At the secondary level, there are 6 public high schools and 2 private high schools. Students can continue their studies in nearby cities like Naga and Legazpi.

A key institution in Pasacao is the Central Bicol State University of Agriculture (CBSUA) - Pasacao Campus, which offers undergraduate programs in education. The town also supports non-formal education through the Alternative Learning System (ALS) for out-of-school youth and adults, and technical and vocational training through the Camarines Sur Institute of Fisheries and Marine Sciences (CASIFMAS), which offers courses in various vocational fields.

Below is the list of the tertiary and secondary level existing schools on the municipality.

=== Primary and elementary schools ===
- Arborvitae Plains Montessori
- Bagong Silang Elementary School
- Bahay Elementary School
- Balagon Elementary School
- Balogo Baptist Christian School
- Balogo Elementary School
- Caranan Elementary School (North)
- Caranan Elementary School (South)
- Compra Elementary School
- Cuco Elementary School
- Dalupaoon Elementary School
- Hubo Elementary School
- Itulan Elementary School
- La Florianne Institute of Learning
- Lyceo de Pasacao
- Macad Elementary School
- Odicon Elementary School
- Pasacao Academy
- Pasacao Central School
- Quitang Elementary School
- Salvacion Elementary School
- San Antonio Elementary School
- Tilnac Elementary School
- Tinalmud Elementary School

=== Secondary schools ===
- Antipolo Heights Integrated School
- Arbovitae Plains Montessori
- Balogo Baptist Christian School (Junior High School)
- Dalupaon National High School
- Dr. Lorenzo P. Ziga Memorial High School
- Juan F. Triviño Memorial High School
- La Florianne Institute of Learning (Junior High School)
- Lyceo de Pasacao
- Pasacao Academy
- Pasacao Municipal High School
- Rolando R. Andaya Memorial High School

=== Higher educational institutions ===
- Camarines Sur Institute of Fisheries & Marine Sciences
- Camarines Sur Institute of Fisheries & Marine Sciences (Caranan Campus)
- Central Bicol State University for Agriculture

== Notable people ==
- Tomas Karingal
