= Bernardino Cortez =

Filipino Catholic bishop (born 1949)

The Most Reverend Bernardino Cruz Cortez D.D.
- Prelate Emeritus of Infanta
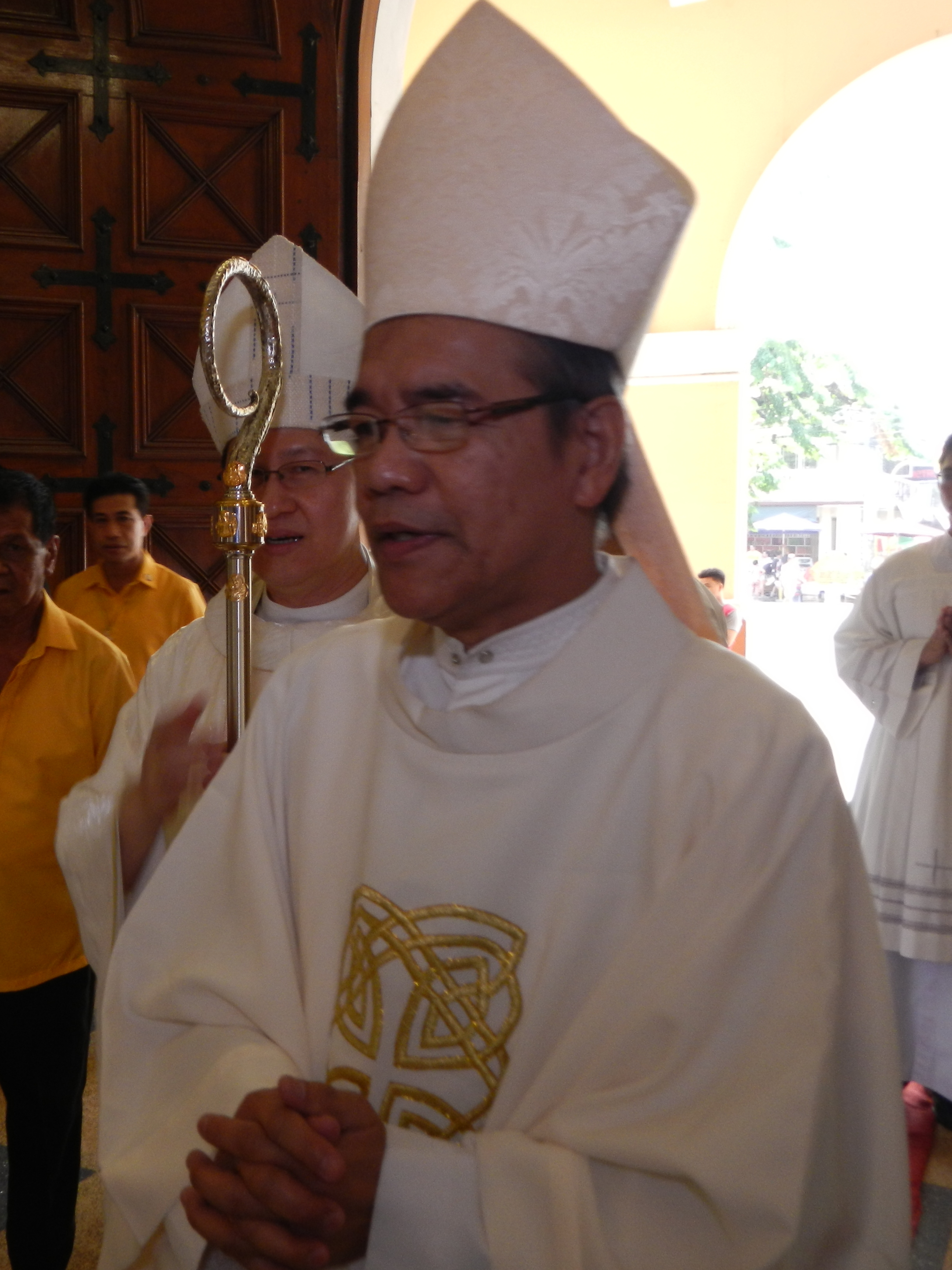
- Cortez in 2013
- Church: Roman Catholic Church
- Province: Lipa
- See: Territorial Prelature of Infanta
- Appointed: October 27, 2014
- Installed: January 23, 2015
- Retired: May 16, 2025
- Predecessor: Rolando Tria Tirona
- Successor: Dave Capucao
- Previous posts: Auxiliary Bishop of Manila (2004–2014); Titular Bishop of Bladia (2004–2014)

Orders
- Ordination: June 23, 1974 by Pedro Bantigue
- Consecration: August 20, 2004 by Antonio Franco

Personal details
- Born: Bernardino Cruz Cortez; July 3, 1949 (age 77) Baclaran, Parañaque, Rizal, Philippines
- Motto: In omnibus caritas (In Everything, Charity)
- Coat of arms

Styles of Bernardino Cortez
- Reference style: His Excellency; The Most Reverend
- Spoken style: Your Excellency
- Religious style: Bishop

Bernardino Cruz Cortez (born July 3, 1949) is a Filipino bishop of the Roman Catholic Church who served as the Prelate of the Territorial Prelature of Infanta in the Philippines from 2015 to 2025.

== Early life and education ==
Cortez was born on July 3, 1949, in Baclaran, Parañaque, Philippines. He pursued his early seminary formation at Our Lady of Guadalupe Minor Seminary from 1965 to 1967 before continuing his studies in philosophy and theology at San Carlos Seminary from 1967 to 1974. Later, he furthered his education by obtaining a master's degree in Sacred Theology from the University of Fribourg in Switzerland from 1990 to 1993.

== Priesthood ==
Cortez was ordained a priest on June 23, 1974. He initially served as a parochial vicar at the Cathedral of San Pablo while also taking on the role of Prefect of Discipline at the Minor Seminary of San Pablo. From 1975 to 1978, he became the parish priest of Saint John the Evangelist Parish in Kalayaan, Laguna. He later took on the role of chaplain at a public school in Tondo, Manila, from 1979 to 1982.

From 1983 to 1985, Cortez was assigned to pastoral ministry in Venasque, France. Upon returning to the Philippines, he served as a spiritual director at Saint Peter College Seminary in San Pablo, Laguna from 1985 to 1986. His ministry in seminary formation continued when he was appointed spiritual director at the San Pablo Theological Formation House in Tagaytay City from 1988 to 1990, and at Saint Peter's College Seminary in San Pablo City from 1993 to 1994.

In 1993, he also took on the responsibility of being the parish priest at Our Lady of Angels Parish in Santa Maria, Laguna. He later served as spiritual director at Saint Peter's College Seminary again from 1995 to 1999 while being appointed director of the Office for the Formation of Priests in 1998.

By 1999, Cortez became a member of the Synodal Examinators, the Presbyteral Council, and the College of Consultors. He was the parish priest at Saint Therese of the Child Jesus inside University of the Philippines Los Baños in Los Baños, Laguna from 2000 to 2004.

== Episcopal ministry ==
On May 31, 2004, Pope John Paul II appointed Cortez as Auxiliary Bishop of Manila and Titular Bishop of Bladia. He was consecrated on August 20, 2004, by Archbishop Antonio Franco, Apostolic Nuncio to the Philippines.

Before his appointment to Infanta, Cortez served as the Diocesan Administrator of Diocese of San Pablo in 2004. He later became a member of the CBCP Commission on Seminaries from 2005 to 2009 and served as its chairman from 2005 to 2013. He was also involved with the CBCP Commission on Social Communications and Mass Media, and the Permanent Committee on Public Affairs from 2013 to 2015.

On October 27, 2014, Pope Francis appointed him as the fourth Bishop-Prelate of Infanta, succeeding Archbishop Rolando Joven Tria Tirona. He was installed on January 23, 2015.

Pope Leo XIV accepted Cortez's retirement on May 16, 2025, and appointed Dave Capucao as his successor.

== Advocacy and initiatives ==
Bishop Cortez has been an active advocate for environmental and social issues. He has been a vocal opponent of the China-funded Kaliwa Dam project, expressing concerns over its potential impact on indigenous communities and the environment. In 2019, he emphasized the importance of preserving the Sierra Madre mountain range, stating that the survival of local communities depends on the care of their natural surroundings.

In 2020, he reiterated that the dam project poses risks to lowland agricultural and fishing communities with a history of flash flooding. The area is also home to thousands of Dumagats, an indigenous community in the highlands of Infanta.

In 2022, Bishop Cortez, alongside Bishop Mel Rey Uy of Lucena, led a protest march in Lucena City against the Kaliwa Dam project.

Catholic Church titles
Preceded by Rolando Tria Tirona	Prelate of Infanta; January 23, 2015 – May 16, 2025	Succeeded by Dave Capucao
Preceded by António Marto	— TITULAR — Bishop of Bladia; August 20, 2004 – October 27, 2014	Succeeded by Eduardo Vieira dos Santos
