= Dave Capucao =

Filipino Catholic bishop (born 1965)

His Excellency, The Most Reverend Dave Dean Capucao D.D., STD, PhD
- Prelate of Infanta
- Church: Roman Catholic Church
- See: Territorial Prelature of Infanta
- Appointed: May 16, 2025
- Installed: September 5, 2025
- Predecessor: Bernardino Cortez
- Previous posts: Priest, Territorial Prelature of Infanta (1994–2006; 2011–19; 2021–25); Priest, Roman Catholic Archdiocese of Utrecht (2006–11; 2020–21)

Orders
- Ordination: October 3, 1994 by Julio Xavier Labayen
- Consecration: September 5, 2025 by Charles John Brown

Personal details
- Born: Dave Dean Capucao; September 25, 1965 (age 61) Naga, Camarines Sur, Philippines
- Education: Saint Louis University; Maryhill School of Theology; Radboud University Nijmegen; Katholieke Universiteit Leuven
- Motto: Sentire cum ecclesia (Latin for 'To feel with the Church')
- Coat of arms: Dave Dean Capucao's coat of arms

Ordination history
History
Priestly ordination
- Ordained by: Julio Xavier Labayen
Episcopal consecration
- Principal consecrator: Charles John Brown
- Co-consecrators: Bernardino Cortez; Rolando Tria Tirona

Styles of Dave Dean Capucao
- Reference style: His Excellency; The Most Reverend
- Spoken style: Your Excellency
- Religious style: Bishop

Dave Dean Capucao (born September 25, 1965) is a Filipino Catholic prelate who serves as the fifth Prelate of Infanta in the province of Quezon in the Philippines.

== Early life and education ==
Dave Dean Capucao was born on September 25, 1965, in Naga, Camarines Sur in the Philippines. After joining the Congregation of the Immaculate Heart of Mary (CICM), he studied philosophy at Saint Louis University in Baguio, followed by theology at Maryhill School of Theology in Quezon City.

Capucao was sent to the Netherlands in 2000 and studied at the Catholic University of Nijmegen (later Radboud University Nijmegen), where he earned a master's degree in intercultural and interreligious theology in 2002. He later worked as a junior researcher from 2002 to 2006, and defended his doctoral dissertation on religion and ethnocentrism in 2009 at the said university.

He earned a doctorate in Philosophy (PhD) doctorate in sacred theology (SThD) at Catholic University of Louvain in Belgium and a PhD at Radboud University Nijmegen.

== Ministry ==
=== Priesthood ===
Capucao was ordained a priest for the Territorial Prelature of Infanta on October 3, 1994. Following his ordination, he served as parish priest of Nuestra Señora de Salvacion in Casiguran, Aurora, a post he maintained until 2000.

Upon the invitation of Cardinal Adrianus Johannes Simonis, Capucao remained in the Netherlands in 2006 and was assigned to serve at St. Ludger Parish in Lichtenvoorde. In 2011, he returned to the Philippines. At the Saint Joseph Formation House in Quezon City (a seminary owned by the Territorial Prelature of Infanta), he was the academic and pastoral director, as well as the formator of the seminary from 2012 to 2014, before becoming its rector in 2015. Since 2012, Capucao taught in various seminaries and theology schools in Metro Manila and nearby areas

He returned to the Netherlands in 2020 and served as visiting priest at St. John the Baptist in Vinkeveen for a year (2020-2021) while taking his sabbatical leave after celebrating his 25th priesthood anniversary. When he returned back to the Philippines in 2021, he was named superintendent of the Catholic Schools of the Prelature of Infanta.

=== Episcopate ===
Pope Leo XIV appointed Capucao as the fifth Territorial Prelate of Infanta on May 16, 2025, succeeding the retiring Bernardino Cortez. He is the first Filipino bishop to be appointed, consecrated, and installed entirely under Leo since being elected. His consecration and installation was on September 5, 2025.

Catholic Church titles
Preceded by Bernardino Cortez	Prelate of Infanta; September 5, 2025 – present	Incumbent
