= Sinnuara =

The Diocese of Sinnuara (in Latin : Dioecesis Sinnuaritana) is a sede soppressa and titular see of the Roman Catholic Church. The bishopric is suffragan to the Archdiocese of Carthage.

The diocese was during the Roman Empire centered on a town called Sinnuara, in the Roman province of Africa Proconsularis. That town is now lost but was in what is today Tunisia.

There are two documented bishops of this diocese:

- The Catholic bishop, Stefano, who attended the Council of Carthage (411). It seem the city did not have at Donatist bishops at that time.
- Bishop Paul, who took part in the synod called in Carthage in 484 by the Vandal king Huneric, after which Paul was exiled.
- Today Sinnuara survives as titular bishopric and the current bishop is Felipe González González, Vicar Apostolic of Caroní.

Africa Proconsularis (125 AD).

Known bishops of Sinnuara

- Stefano (fl. 411)
- Paul (fl. 484)
- Julio Xavier Labayen (1966–1978)
- Kurongku (1978–1981)
- Patras Yusaf (1981–1984)
- Felipe González González, since 25 November 1985.
