= Territorial Prelature of Infanta =

Latin Catholic ecclesiastical territory in the Philippines

Territorial Prelature of Infanta Praelatura Territorialis Infantensis Prelatura Teritoryal ng Infanta

Catholic
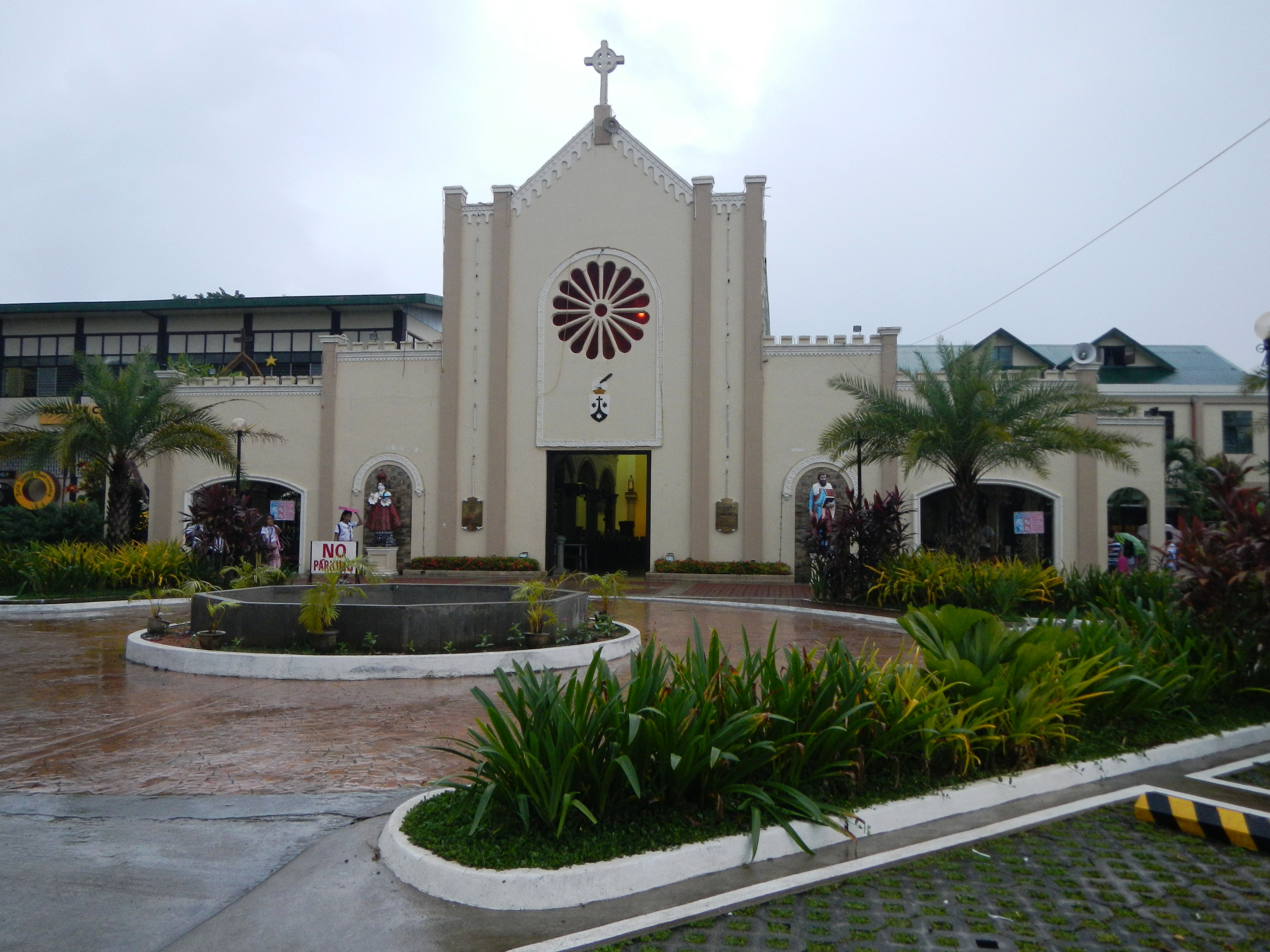
- Infanta Cathedral

- Coat of arms

Location
- Country: Philippines
- Territory: Northern Quezon (Burdeos, General Nakar, Infanta, Jomalig, Panukulan, Patnanungan, Polillo, Real), Aurora
- Ecclesiastical province: Lipa
- Metropolitan: Lipa
- Coordinates: 14°44′50″N 121°38′59″E

Statistics
- Area: 7,189 km^{2} (2,776 sq mi)
- Population: Total; Catholics: (as of 2021); 512,000; 414,000 (80.9%)

Information
- Denomination: Catholic
- Sui iuris church: Latin Church
- Rite: Roman Rite
- Cathedral: Cathedral-Parish of the Divine Infant Jesus of Prague and St. Mark the Evangelist

Current leadership
- Pope: Leo XIV
- Prelate: Dave Dean Capucao
- Metropolitan Archbishop: Gilbert Garcera
- Bishops emeritus: Bernardino Cortez

The Territorial Prelature of Infanta (Latin: Praelatura Territorialis Infantensis) is a Latin Catholic territorial prelature located in the municipality of Infanta, Quezon, in the ecclesiastical province of Lipa in the Philippines.

It was established on April 25, 1950 by the papal bull Precibus annuentes taking a portion of the then-Diocese of Lipa. In 1953, some municipalities in the civil province of Isabela were added onto it. However, it was taken again by the Diocese of Tuguegarao on August 16, 1955. Originally, the prelature was a suffragan of the Metropolitan Archdiocese of Manila but was transferred to the Ecclesiastical Province of Lipa on June 20, 1972.

The two main divisions of the prelature is based on the two geographical units that comprises it: the province of Quezon and the province of Aurora. Furthermore, it is governed by the prelate through four vicariates that covers (1) the parishes of Real, Infanta, and Nakar, (2) the parishes of the Polillo Islands, (3) parishes within Central Aurora province, and (4) parishes in Northern Aurora.

== Erection ==
The prelature was erected by Pope Pius XII on April 25, 1950 from the Diocese of Lipa. Its territory included the islands of Polillo and the northern part of the province of Quezon. At this time, the province of Aurora is a sub-province of Quezon. The boundaries of the prelature was defined to reach the Diocese of Tuguegarao to the north; to the west, Nueva Vizcaya, Nueva Ecija, Bulacan, and Rizal; the Pacific Ocean is the eastern boundary; while the common boundaries of Infanta and Mauban is in the south.

Upon the erection of the See of Infanta, Bishop Rufino Jiao Santos (later Archbishop of Manila and a cardinal) was appointed Apostolic Administrator. A year later, on July 11, 1951, Rev. Fr. Patrick Harmon Shanley, OCD, Vicar Provincial of the Order of Discalced Carmelites in the Philippine Islands, was appointed Apostolic Administrator of the Prelature of Infanta.

== Prelates ==
The Prelature of Infanta was first administered as a mission of the Order of Discalced Carmelites. Its apostolic administrators and bishops were members of the religious order until 2015. These include Bishop Patrick Shanley, OCD, Fr. Joseph Flanery, OCD, Bishop Julio Xavier Labayen, OCD, and Bishop Rolando Tirona, OCD.

Bishop		Period in office	Notes	Coat of Arms
1	Patrick (Harmon) Shanley of Saint Cecelia, OCD	March 17, 1953 – September 12, 1960 (7 years, 179 days)	Resigned	
2.	Julio Xavier Lizares Labayen, OCD	September 12, 1966 – June 28, 2003 (36 years, 289 days)	Retired	
3	Rolando Joven Tria Tirona, OCD	August 27, 2003 – September 8, 2012 (9 years, 12 days)	Appointed Archbishop of Caceres	
4	Bernardino Cruz Cortez	January 23, 2015 – May 16, 2025 (9 years, 12 days)	Retired	
5	Dave Dean Capucao	September 5, 2025 – present (336 days)		

== Parishes ==
Vicariate of Infant Jesus and Saint Mark

- Divine Infant Jesus of Prague and Saint Mark Parish (Infanta Cathedral), Infanta, Quezon
- Saints Anne and Joachim Parish, General Nakar, Quezon
- Saint Raphael the Archangel Parish, Real, Quezon
- Saint Joseph Quasi-Parish, Barangay Llavac, Real, Quezon

Vicariate of Saint Joseph

- Prelature Shrine of Saint Joseph, Polillo, Quezon
- Saint Raphael Parish, Burdeos, Quezon
- Saint John the Baptist Parish, Panukulan, Quezon
- Saint Isidore Parish, Patnanungan, Quezon
- Nuestra Señora dela Salvacion Parish, Jomalig, Quezon

Vicariate of San Luis Obispo

- San Luis Obispo Parish, Baler, Aurora
- San Luis Rey Parish, San Luis, Aurora
- Saint Vincent Ferrer Parish, Maria Aurora, Aurora
- Maria, Ina ng Sambayanan ng mga Dukha Parish, Quirino, Maria Aurora
- Saint Therese of the Infant Jesus Parish, Dipaculao, Aurora
- Saint Patrick Parish, Dingalan, Aurora

Vicariate of Saint Anthony of Padua

- Saint Anthony de Padua Parish, Casiguran, Aurora
- Saint Isidore the Farmer Parish, Dinalungan, Aurora
- Saint Joseph the Worker Parish, Dilasag, Aurora
- Nuestra Señora dela Salvacion Parish, Casiguran, Aurora

== Sources ==
- GCatholic.org
- Catholic Hierarchy
- Prelature website
