= Santa Maria, Laguna =

Municipality in Laguna, Philippines

Santa Maria Caboan
- Municipality
- Municipality of Santa Maria
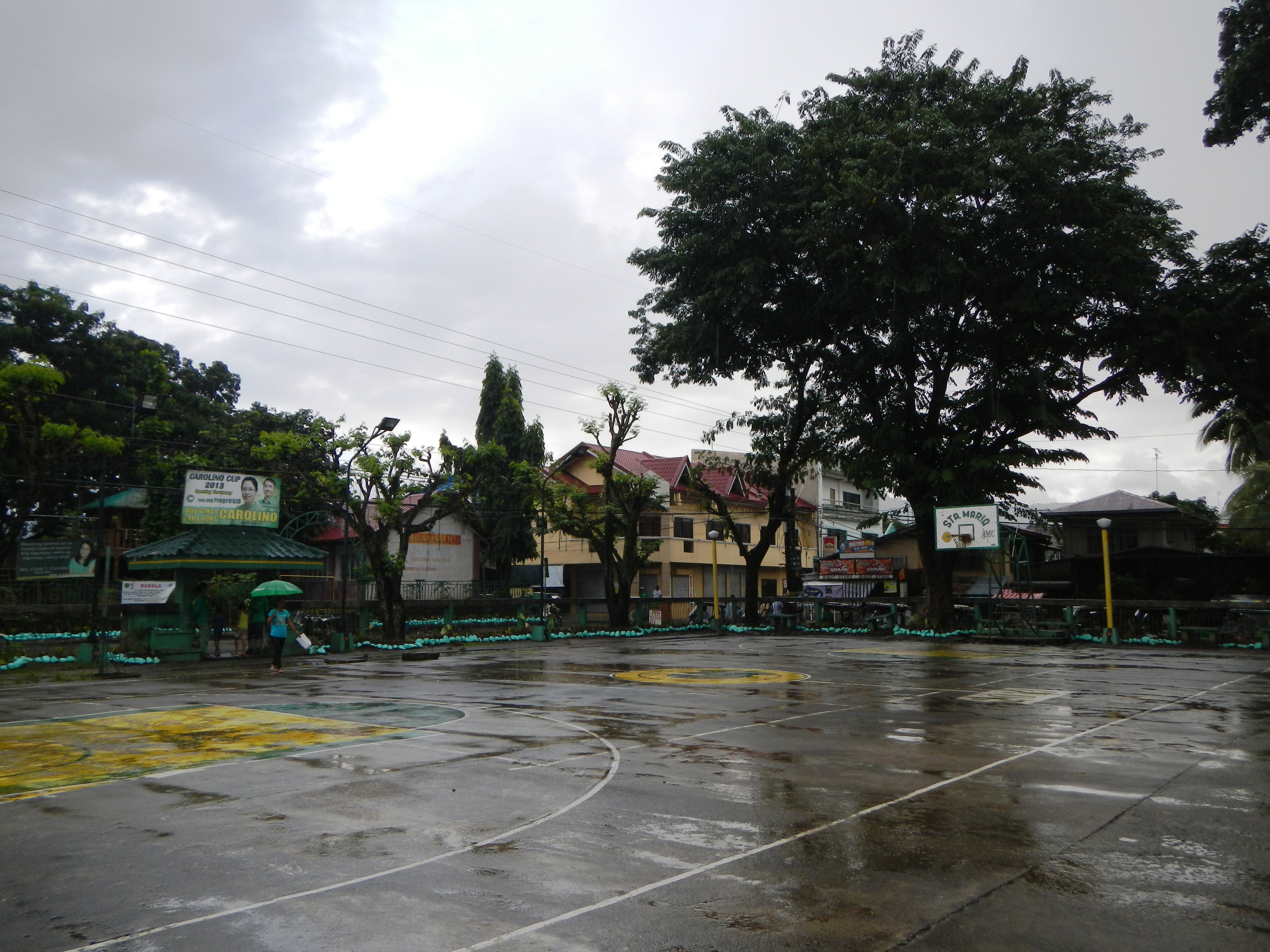
- Municipal Plaza

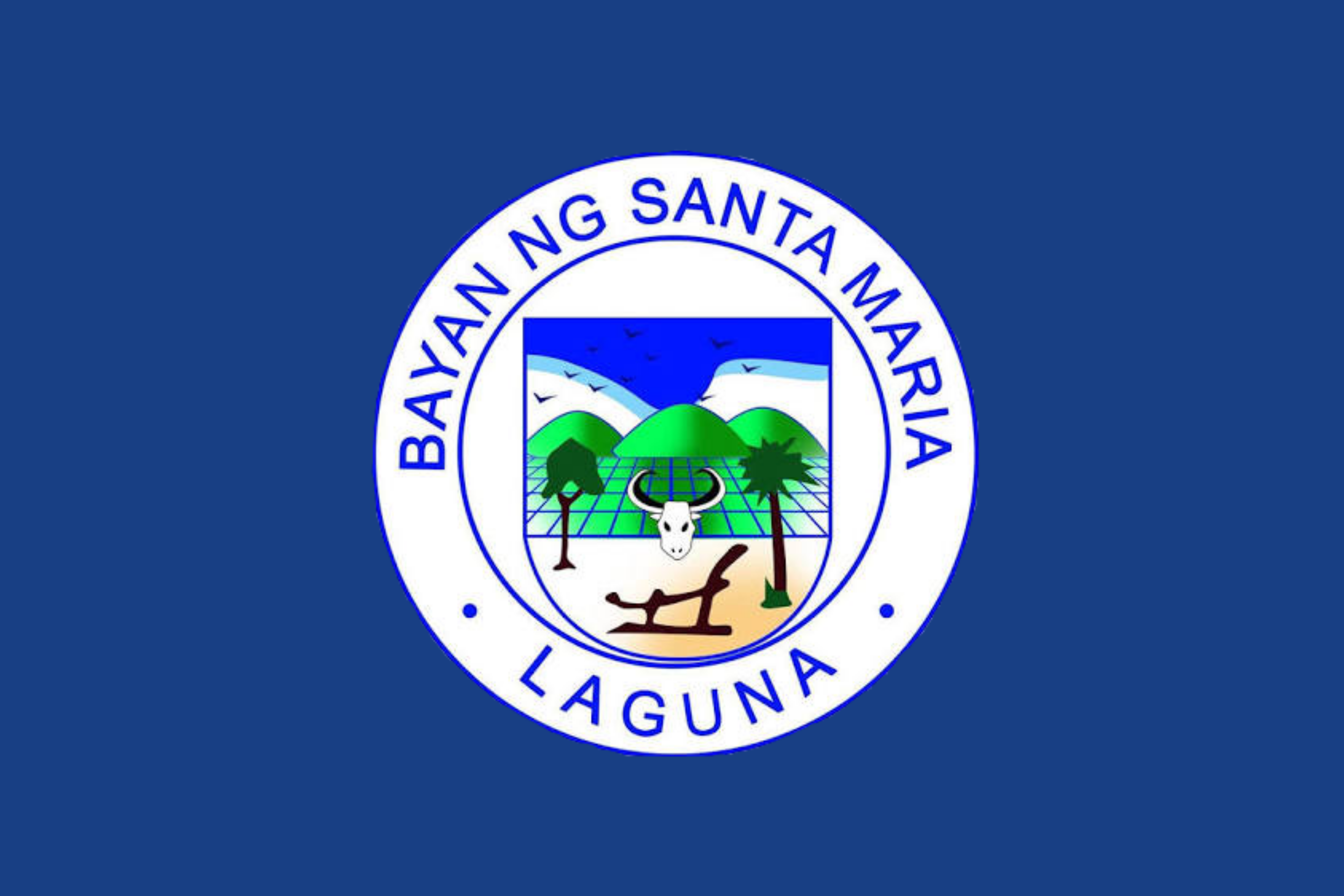
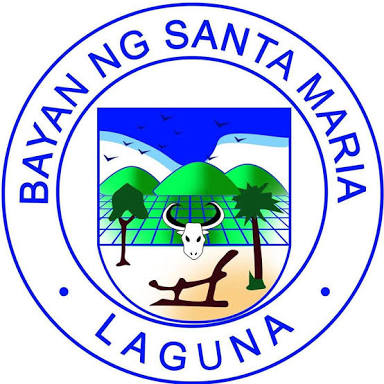
- Flag Seal

- Map of Laguna with Santa Maria highlighted
- Interactive map of Santa Maria
- Location within the Philippines
- Coordinates: 14°28′30″N 121°25′30″E
- Country: Philippines
- Region: Calabarzon
- Province: Laguna
- District: 4th district
- Annexation to Mabitac: October 12, 1903
- Re-established: January 1, 1910
- Barangays: 25 (see Barangays)

Government
  - Type: Sangguniang Bayan
  - Mayor: Maria Rocelle V. Carolino
  - Vice Mayor: Jayson E. Cuento
  - Representative: Benjamin Cueto "Benjie" Agarao Jr.
  - Municipal Council: Members: Romualdo Manuel P. Aguja; Elmer B. Montales; Jeffry A. Ariola; Lorna D. Alban; Cynthia S. Tamares; Wennie Jude P. Nipay; Ronald M. Ilagan; Roselle P. Arcillas
  - Electorate: 24,141 voters (2025)

Area
  - Total: 108.40 km^{2} (41.85 sq mi)
- Elevation: 303 m (994 ft)
- Highest elevation: 964 m (3,163 ft)
- Lowest elevation: 4 m (13 ft)

Population (2024 census)
  - Total: 34,102
  - Density: 314.59/km^{2} (814.79/sq mi)
  - Households: 8,869

Economy
  - Income class: 2nd municipal income class
  - Poverty incidence: 13.38% (2023)
  - Revenue: ₱ 178.8 million (2024)
  - Assets: ₱ 470.1 million (2024)
  - Expenditure: ₱ 78.5 million (2024)
  - Liabilities: ₱ 85.05 million (2024)

Service provider
  - Electricity: First Laguna Electric Cooperative (FLECO)
- Time zone: UTC+8 (PST)
- ZIP code: 4022
- PSGC: 0403427000
- IDD : area code: +63 (0)49
- Native languages: Hatang Kayi; Tagalog

Santa Maria, officially the Municipality of Santa Maria (Tagalog: Bayan ng Santa Maria), is a municipality in the province of Laguna, Philippines. According to the 2024 census, it has a population of 34,102 people.

== History ==
From Mabitac, a mountain path led northward to a village known as Caboan. Near the village entrance, people gathered along this route, where Chinese merchants engaged in the buying and selling of goods, livestock, and agricultural produce. Aeta groups traded herbs, medicinal roots, and wild honey, while women from Mabitac exchanged chickens for clay pots, pandan mats, and sabutan hats. The area functioned as an active marketplace.

Caboan came from the Tagalog word “Kabuhuan,” which means bamboo thicket. “Buho,” is a genus of bamboo, which grows abundantly in the village. Caboan is a miracle of nature. Rare orchids and wild flowers decorated its forests. Its falls called “Ambon-ambon” located in one corner of the village looks like a stair of giant rocks going up to heaven. Its Nilubugan River was rich in exquisite white rocks and stones and its crystal-clear water seems to drift to nowhere.

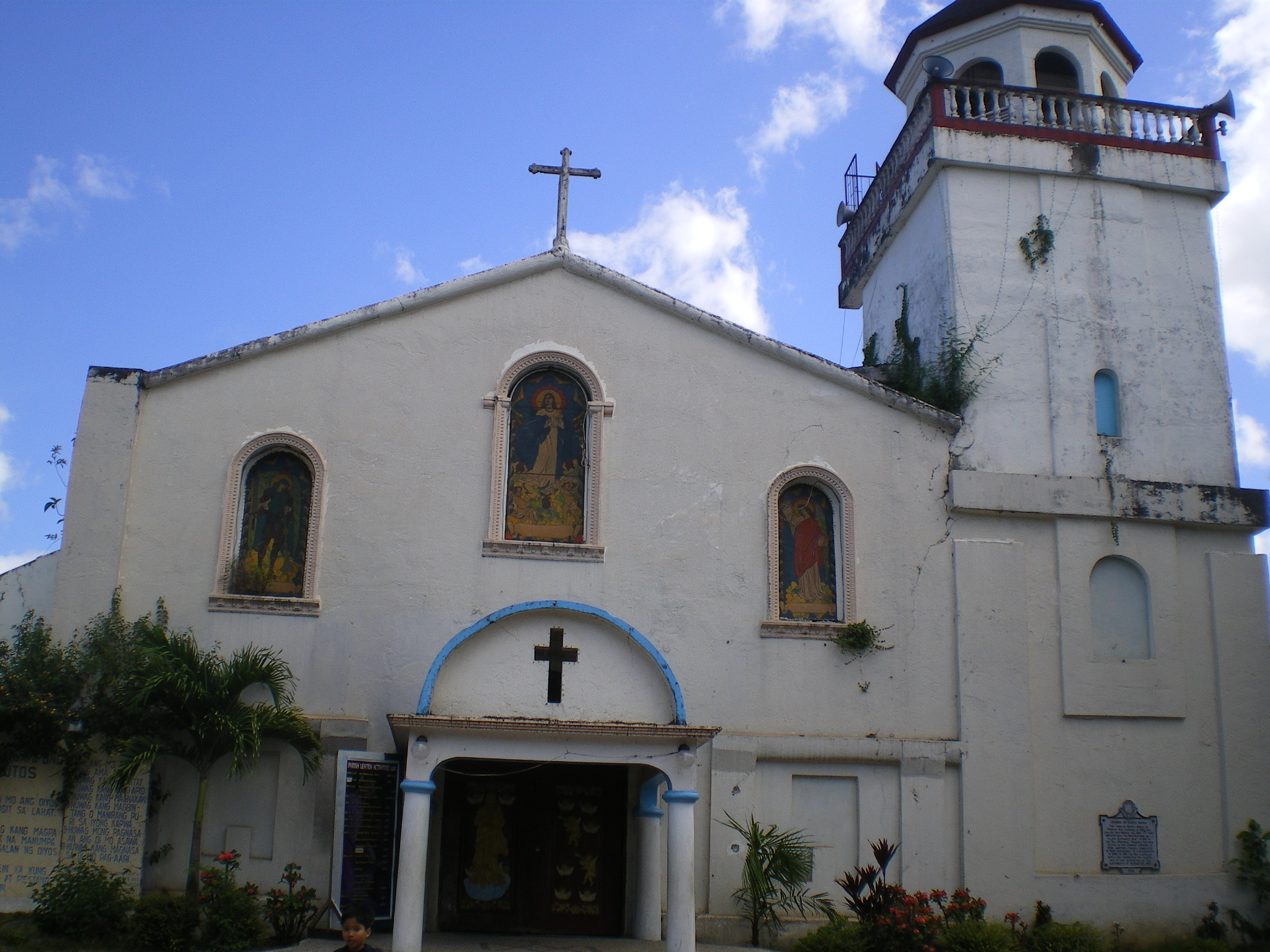
Santa Maria Church

This village used to be a part of then Guiling-guiling, now Siniloan. Padre Antonio de la Llave was the first parish priest of Caboan. Residents believe that he was the one responsible for making the village a town and in renaming it into San Miguel de Caboan in 1602.

A legend tells the story of how San Miguel de Caboan became Santa María. The story says that a couple going home from the market place after trading their vegetable harvest with their basic needs, found lying on the ground an image of the blessed virgin. At first, they thought it was a porcelain piece dropped by a Chinese merchant. Porcelain was a very expensive commodity during the period as it is today. After careful examination, they recognized the image as that of the Virgin Mary. The couple made an altar in their house and enthroned the image there.

The next morning the couple was astonished. The image was gone. They looked for the image all over, until they decided to look at the place where they found it. They saw a group of women, poking with a long stick something on the ground that looked like a piece of ivory. It was the image of the Virgin. It was back at the very spot where they found it.

In 1613, Padre Geronimo Vásquez built the first church on the spot where the couple found the image of the Virgin Mary. Thus, San Miguel de Caboan became Santa María de los Ángeles, in short — Santa María. The Chinese uprising in 1639 destroyed the church. Parishioners rebuilt it in 1669, before the earthquake of 1880 leveled it again to the ground. Padre Leopoldo Arellano raised it once more in 1891. The facade of the church is still surviving and is now known as the Nuestra Señora de los Angeles Parish Church. The church was again partly destroyed during the earthquake of August 20, 1937, but was not reconstructed until after the Liberation in 1945.

=== Pre-Spanish and Spanish Regime ===
The first and patronal name of Santa Maria was San Miguel de Caboan. San Miguel was the name given by the Spanish friar who founded the town, which was in honor of St. Michael the Archangel, the town's first patron. Caboan came from the native term "kabuhuan", a kind of bamboo abundant in the place during that time. The first church was built in the same place where the present church is erected. It was then made of cogon and bamboo.

There was also the first Parochial school ran by Spanish friars. According to information, Catholic faith was well embraced by the people. It was believed that the people of this town had always been good and loyal followers. No remarkable Spanish relics could be traced in this town nowadays. It is only the facade of the church in which traces of Spanish culture could be seen as shown by the materials in which it was made of. That one could distinguish that there had been such regime in this town. However, folk tales on "Bailes and Comparsas" could still be heard among elders.

=== American Regime ===
When the Philippines was ceded to the United States of America by Spain, the Filipinos realized that they were under another authority for the second time. The people of Santa Maria were at first confused of the new kind of life. So, whenever they heard that Americans were coming, men went up the mountains to evade membership to the American Army. This according to them was due to their sad experience with the Spanish rule.

The people of Santa Maria were so afraid of the new policies they might encounter. Whenever they heard that Americans would be coming to town, all men in the family went up the mountains and hide. Until the time came when they realized that Americans were far better than the Spaniards.

In 1903, Santa Maria was reduced to a barrio of Mabitac under Act 939, when the 30 municipalities of La Laguna was reduced to just 19. In 1910, Santa Maria was restored as an independent municipality under Executive Order No. 72, s. 1909.

The United States Congress passed a law which granted the Philippine Government the right to give the public lands to persons who wanted to cultivate them. This became the policy of attraction of the Municipal President Leoncio Real. Large tracts of public land were opened for agricultural purposes. This caused the influx of settlers from the neighboring towns and provinces then, the development of agriculture as well as the establishment of the different barrios began. People were encouraged to apply for homestead. More lands were given to the landless. The U.S. Congress helped much in the agricultural development of the country soon after peace was declared.

Many farms were abandoned and locusts destroyed the crops planted in the place. The U.S. Government aided the people through importing rice. Work animals also brought in to improve the animal resources in the country. The Bureau of Agriculture was established. The farmers were taught better farming methods and control of plant pest and diseases. Road and transportation were improved. The different means of communications such as radio telegraph, and postal services were introduced and modernized.

=== Japanese occupation ===
Guerilla warfare was carried on different places in the barrios and mountains. There were also attacks made at the poblacion where there were Japanese garrisons.

The guerilla units who helped the natives of Santa Maria were Marking's Filipino-American ROTC Hunters and V-J units. Their aim was to fight for freedom against the Japanese forces. The people in the town helped these units in terms of food, clothing and cash.

There were great incident that took place in Santa Maria during the regime. The guerilla troop with the leadership of Martin Bautista, a native of this town invaded the Japanese headquarters which was located at the oldest school building. Some civilians were badly hurt. Several houses near the school building were destroyed. Another unforgettable incident that happened in 1942 was when Captain Nacamura, a high-ranking official of the Japanese Imperial Army, was killed. He and his men encountered the guerillas at Barrio Kayhacat. After his death, the natives of Santa Maria witnessed the ceremonial burning of his dead body.

Another Japanese official who was killed was Captain Sakai. He was killed outside the town of Santa Maria by Colonel Pabling, a native of Antipolo, Rizal. One system made by the puppet Republic to counteract guerrillas was the zone system, where all male inhabitants suspected of being a guerrilla were kept in the church without food, little water and tortured or massacred. Ponciano "Sabu" Arida of Santa Maria was the youngest guerrilla in the country. He was only 11 years old when he made some heroic deeds in the town. He was the runner of the guerrilla spy and supply officer. In 1944, Alyas Capadudia, a Hukbalahap member, encountered the Japanese Army at Barrio Bubucal. Some guerrillas died in this fight and the Japanese burned several houses.

== Geography ==
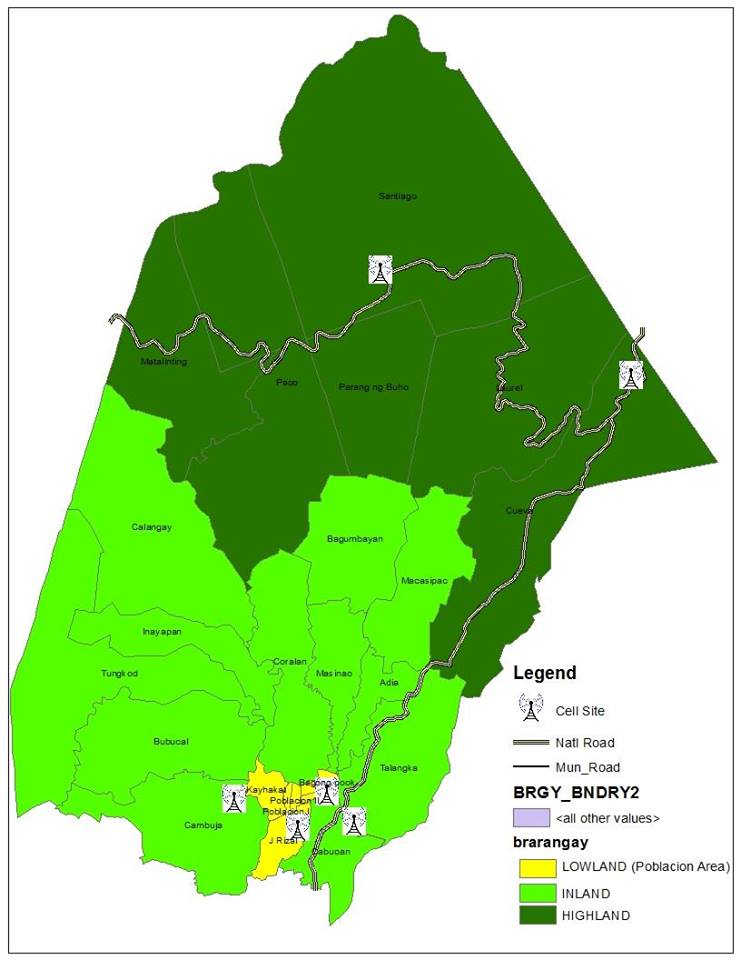
Political subdivisions of Santa Maria

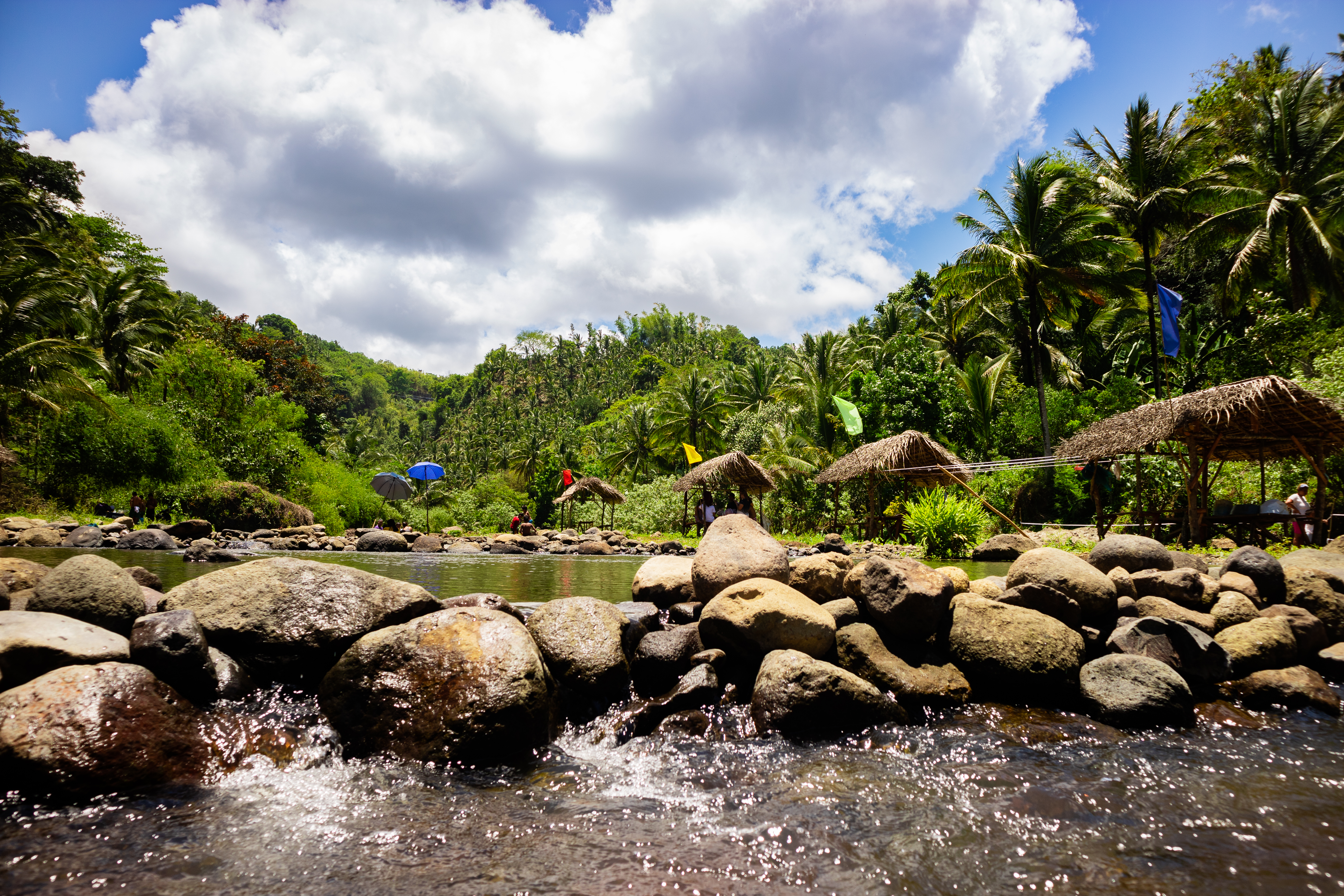
Himao River

Santa Maria is the northernmost town in Laguna.

Bounded by the provinces of Rizal and Quezon from the western portion up to the northern tip down northeastern part, the town has a mountainous terrain. With the MARILAQUE Sub-Regional Plan (Manila-Rizal-Laguna-Quezon), the municipality functions as link between the highly industrialized capital and the marine life-rich Quezon province. The Marikina–Infanta Highway physically connects to the eyed site for the International Port. Silangan Railway Express 2000 (MARILAQUE Railway) is another infrastructure project proposed for implementation under the PPP Scheme.

=== Barangays ===
Santa Maria is politically subdivided into 25 barangays, as indicated in the matrix below. Each barangay consists of puroks and some have sitios.

Currently, there are 6 barangays classified as highland/upland barangays, while 12 are inland barangays, and the remaining 7 are situated in the lowland (Valley area).

Barangays	Classification	2020 Pop.	2015 Pop.	2010 Pop.	2007 Pop.
Adia	Inland	1,120	1,140	1,002	920
Bagong Pook	Lowland	2,310	2,283	2,239	2,314
Bagumbayan	Inland	2,083	1,744	1,584	1,688
Bubucal	Inland	1,267	1,141	1,022	889
Cabooan	Inland	1,981	1,862	1,716	1,629
Calangay	Inland	1,479	1,312	1,043	1,099
Cambuja	Inland	2,139	2,131	1,532	1,540
Coralan	Inland	2,647	2,550	2,393	2,063
Cueva	Upland	1,117	1,043	717	733
Inayapan	Inland	810	868	566	558
Jose P. Laurel, Sr.	Upland	691	529	432	365
Jose P. Rizal	Lowland	1,148	1,094	1,074	1,113
Juan Santiago	Upland	3,856	1,846	1,376	1,630
Kayhacat	Lowland	1,387	1,231	1,106	1,068
Macasipac	Inland	584	566	555	588
Masinao	Inland	851	900	717	700
Matalinting	Upland	477	630	491	456
Pao-o	Upland	827	776	643	545
Parang ng Buho	Upland	949	886	780	702
Poblacion Uno	Lowland	1,219	973	838	1,034
Poblacion Dos	Lowland	627	621	642	706
Poblacion Tres	Lowland	812	855	836	934
Poblacion Quatro	Lowland	504	525	500	609
Talangka	Inland	1,881	1,831	1,678	1,580
Tungkod	Inland	1,745	1,493	1,357	804
TOTAL (Santa Maria)		34,511	30,830	26,839	26,267

=== Climate ===
Climate data for Santa Maria, Laguna
Month	Jan	Feb	Mar	Apr	May	Jun	Jul	Aug	Sep	Oct	Nov	Dec	Year
Mean daily maximum °C (°F)	26 (79)	27 (81)	29 (84)	31 (88)	31 (88)	30 (86)	29 (84)	29 (84)	29 (84)	29 (84)	28 (82)	26 (79)	29 (84)
Mean daily minimum °C (°F)	22 (72)	22 (72)	22 (72)	23 (73)	24 (75)	25 (77)	24 (75)	24 (75)	24 (75)	24 (75)	24 (75)	23 (73)	23 (74)
Average precipitation mm (inches)	58 (2.3)	41 (1.6)	32 (1.3)	29 (1.1)	91 (3.6)	143 (5.6)	181 (7.1)	162 (6.4)	172 (6.8)	164 (6.5)	113 (4.4)	121 (4.8)	1,307 (51.5)
Average rainy days	13.4	9.3	9.1	9.8	19.1	22.9	26.6	24.9	25.0	21.4	16.5	16.5	214.5
Source: Meteoblue

== Demographics ==
Population census of Santa Maria
Year	Pop.	±% p.a.
1903	669	—
1918	698	+0.28%
1939	2,524	+6.31%
1948	3,851	+4.81%
1960	8,378	+6.69%
1970	12,575	+4.14%
1975	13,731	+1.78%
1980	15,744	+2.77%
1990	20,525	+2.69%
1995	22,296	+1.56%
2000	24,574	+2.11%
2007	26,267	+0.92%
2010	26,839	+0.79%
2015	30,830	+2.68%
2020	34,511	+2.40%
2024	34,102	−0.29%
Source: Philippine Statistics Authority

In the 2024 census, the population of Santa Maria was 34,102 people, with a density of 310 inhabitants per square kilometer or 800 inhabitants per square mile.

== Economy ==
Poverty incidence of Santa Maria (%)

Source: Philippine Statistics Authority

== Government ==
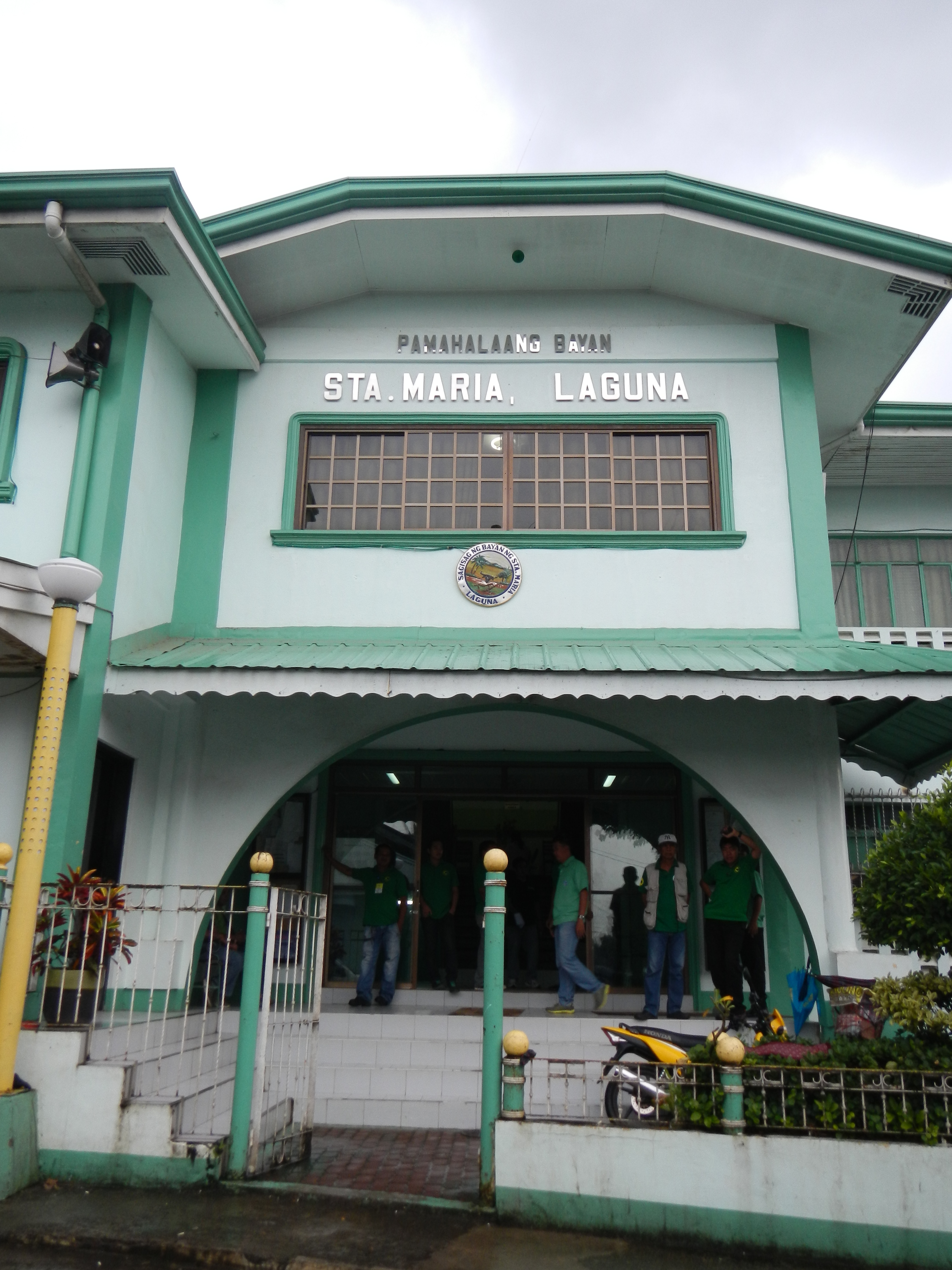
Santa Maria Municipal Hall

=== Elected officials ===
Elected municipal officials (2022–2025)
Position	Name	Party
Mayor	Atty. Ma. Rocelle "Cindy" Carolino	Aksyon
Vice Mayor	Atty. Norlito C. Briones	Aksyon
Councilors	Romualdo Manuel "Sir Egloy" Aguja	Aksyon
Councilors	Elmer Montales	Aksyon
Councilors	Jeffry Ariola	Independent
Councilors	Lorna Alban	Aksyon
Councilors	Cynthia Tamares	Aksyon
Councilors	Wennie Jude Nipay	Aksyon
Councilors	Ronald Ilagan	Independent
Councilors	Roselle Arcillas	Independent

== Education ==
The Santa Maria Schools District Office governs all educational institutions within the municipality. It oversees the management and operations of all private and public, from primary to secondary schools.

=== Primary and elementary schools ===
- Adia Elementary School
- Bagong Pook Elementary School
- Bagumbayan Elementary School
- Cabooan Elementary School
- Calangay Elementary School
- Cambuja-Bubucal Elementary School
- Coralan Elementary School
- Cueva Elementary School
- J. Santiago Elementary School
- J.P. Laurel Elementary School
- Macasipac Elementary School
- Matalinting Elementary School
- New Little Baguio Elementary School
- Paang Bundok Elementary School
- Paoo Elementary School
- Parang Ng Buho Elementary School
- Pulóng Mindanáo Elementary School
- Our Lady of Los Ángeles School
- Santa María Elementary School
- Sta. Maria Academy
- Talangka Elementary School
- Tungkod Elementary School

=== Secondary schools ===
- Gaudencio Octavio National High School
- Santa María National High School (Main)
- Santa María National High School (J. Santiago Annex)
- Santa María National High School (Calangay Annex)
