= Nuestra Señora de los Angeles Parish Church (Santa Maria) =

Roman Catholic church in Laguna, Philippines

Santa Maria Church
- Nuestra Señora de los Angeles Parish Church
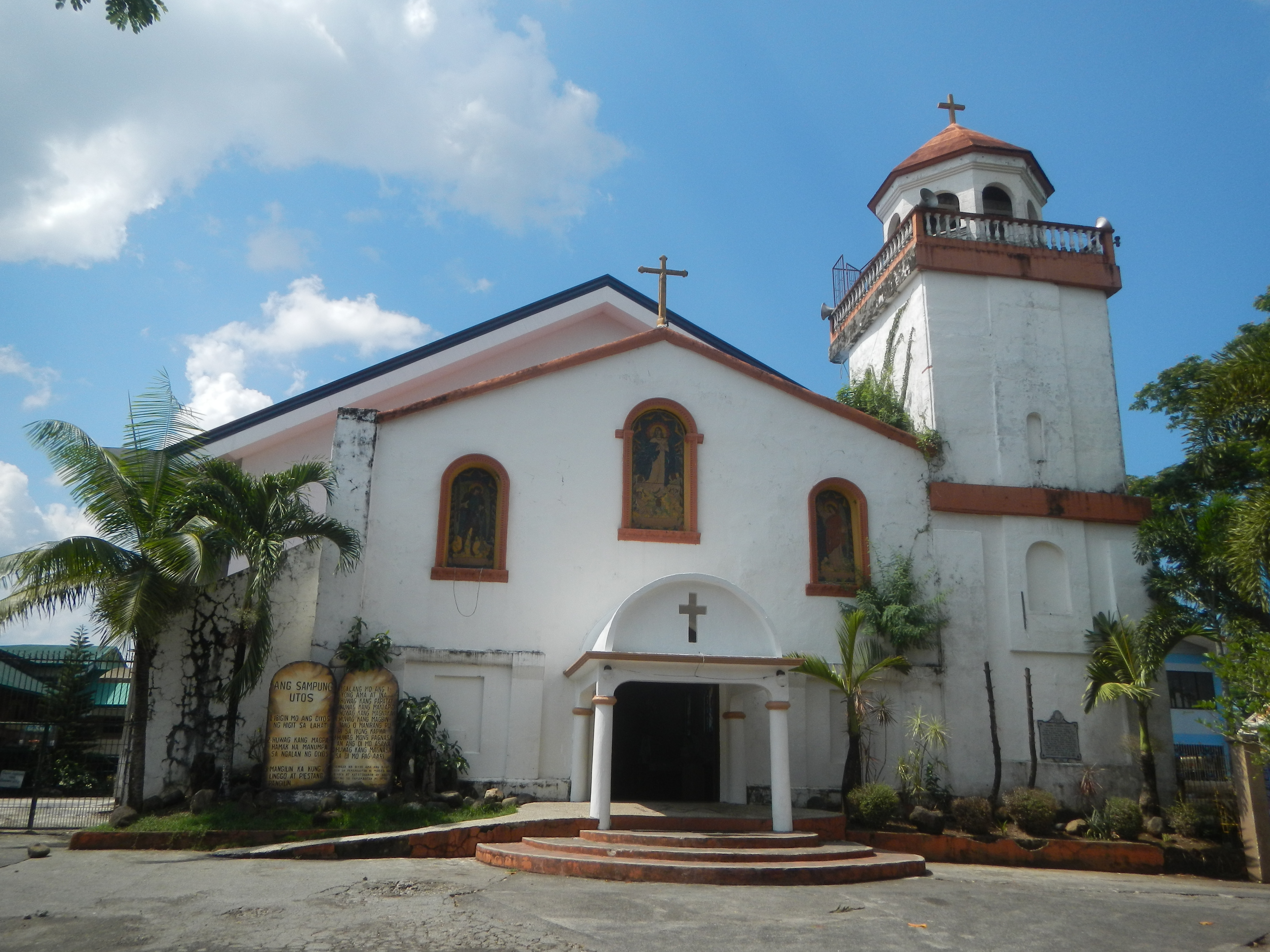
- Church façade in 2019

- Location in Laguna Location in Luzon Location in the Philippines
- 14°28′13″N 121°25′23″E
- Location: Poblacion, Santa Maria, Laguna
- Country: Philippines
- Denomination: Roman Catholic

History
- Status: Parish church
- Founded: 1602
- Dedication: Nuestra Señora de los Angeles (Our Lady of Angels)
- Dedicated: 1613

Architecture
- Functional status: Active
- Style: Church building

Administration
- Province: Manila
- Metropolis: Manila
- Archdiocese: Manila
- Diocese: San Pablo
- Deanery: Sts. Peter and Paul

Clergy
- Priest: John Derrick Manalo

Nuestra Señora de los Angeles Parish Church (also Our Lady of Angels Parish Church), commonly known as Santa Maria Church, is the only Roman Catholic church in the municipality of Santa Maria, Laguna, Philippines under the Diocese of San Pablo. Its titular is the Our Lady of Angels whose feast is celebrated every August 2.

== Church history ==
Santa Maria was formerly a part of Guiling-guiling (now Siniloan) as a small village called Caboan. Father Antonio de la Llave was assigned as the first parish priest of Caboan. In 1602, the small village was converted into a town and renamed San Miguel de Caboan under the patronage of Saint Michael, the Archangel. Father Geronimo Vasquez built the stone church on the exact spot where the image of the Virgin Mary was found by a Caboan couple according to legend in 1613. Since then, the town was named Santa María de Caboan or simply Sta. Maria. The church was destroyed by the 1639 Chinese uprising and was rebuilt in 1669 by José de Jesus María, as well as the rectory. Like the other churches in Laguna, the church of Santa Maria was heavily damaged in the 1880 Luzon earthquakes. It was rebuilt by Leopoldo Arellano in 1891. The facade of the church is still surviving at present. The church was again partly destroyed during the earthquake of August 20, 1937, but was not reconstructed until after the Liberation in 1945.

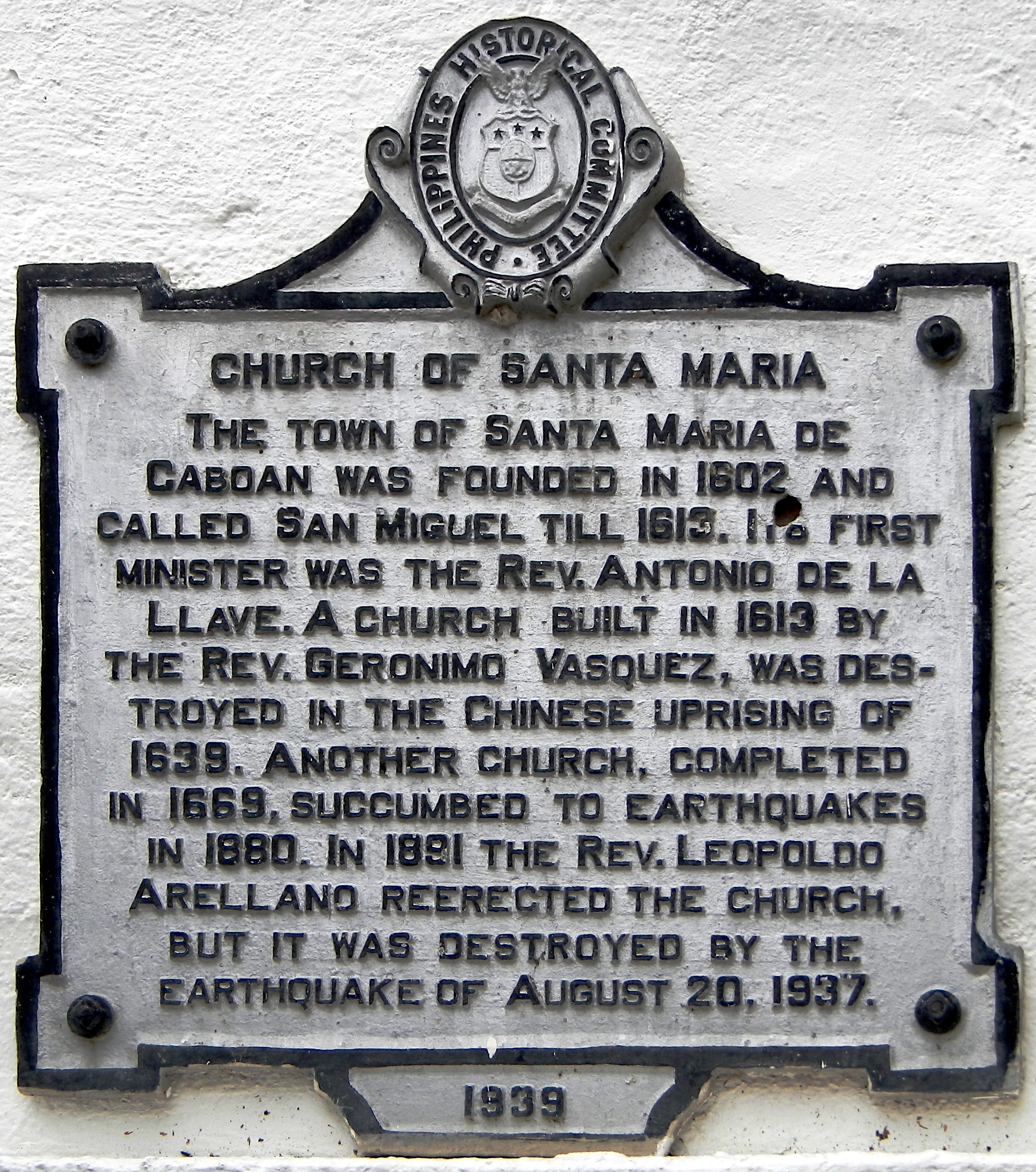
Church PHC historical marker installed in 1939

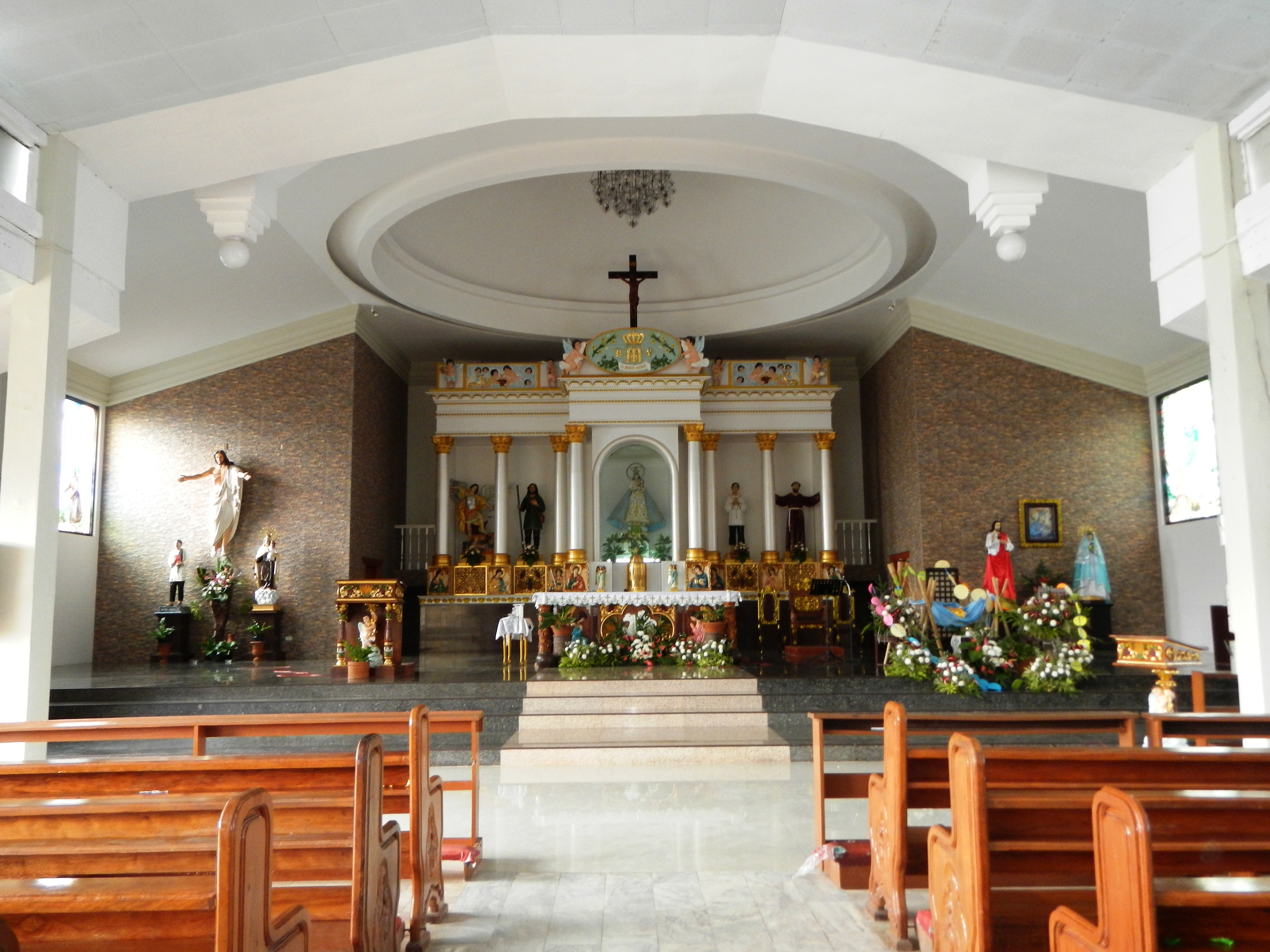
Church sanctuary in 2013

== Bibliography ==
- Huerta, Felix de (1865). Estado geográfico, topográfico, estadístico, histórico-religioso. Binondo: Imprenta de M. Sanchez y Ca.
