= Henchir-Bladia =

Archaeological site in Tunisia

Henchir-Bladia is an archaeological site and locality in southern Tunisia. The stone ruins are tentatively associated with Bladia, a civitas of the Roman province of Byzacena during the Roman Empire. It was a Catholic bishopric.

Bladia was the seat of the Diocese of Bladia (Latin: Dioecesis Bladiensis), a home suppressed and titular see of the Roman Catholic Church. that was suffragan to the Archdiocese of Carthage.

== History ==
Very little is known of the ancient town. Two bishops are known from here, The Catholic Potentiometer, who participated in the Council of Carthage (411) and an unnamed Donatist bishop of Bladia. The conference proceedings have not recorded his name.

Today Bladia survives as a titular bishopric; the current titular bishop is Víctor Iván Vargas Galarza, of Cochabamba.
