= Julio Xavier Labayen =

Filipino Catholic prelate (1926–2016)

The Most Reverend Julio Xavier Labayen OCD
- Prelate Emeritus of Infanta
- Church: Catholic
- See: Prelature of Infanta
- Appointed: July 26, 1966
- Installed: September 12, 1966
- Retired: June 28, 2003
- Predecessor: Patrick Harmon Shanley
- Successor: Rolando Tria Tirona
- Previous post: Titular Bishop of Sinnuara (1966–1978)

Orders
- Ordination: June 4, 1955 by Adeodato Giovanni Piazza
- Consecration: September 8, 1966 by Rufino Jiao Santos

Personal details
- Born: Julio Xavier Lizares Labayen Jr. July 23, 1926 Talisay, Negros Occidental, Philippine Islands
- Died: April 27, 2016 (aged 89) Manila, Philippines
- Buried: Alagad Ni Maria Seminary, Antipolo, Rizal
- Motto: Dominus est (Latin for 'It is the Lord' – John 21:7)
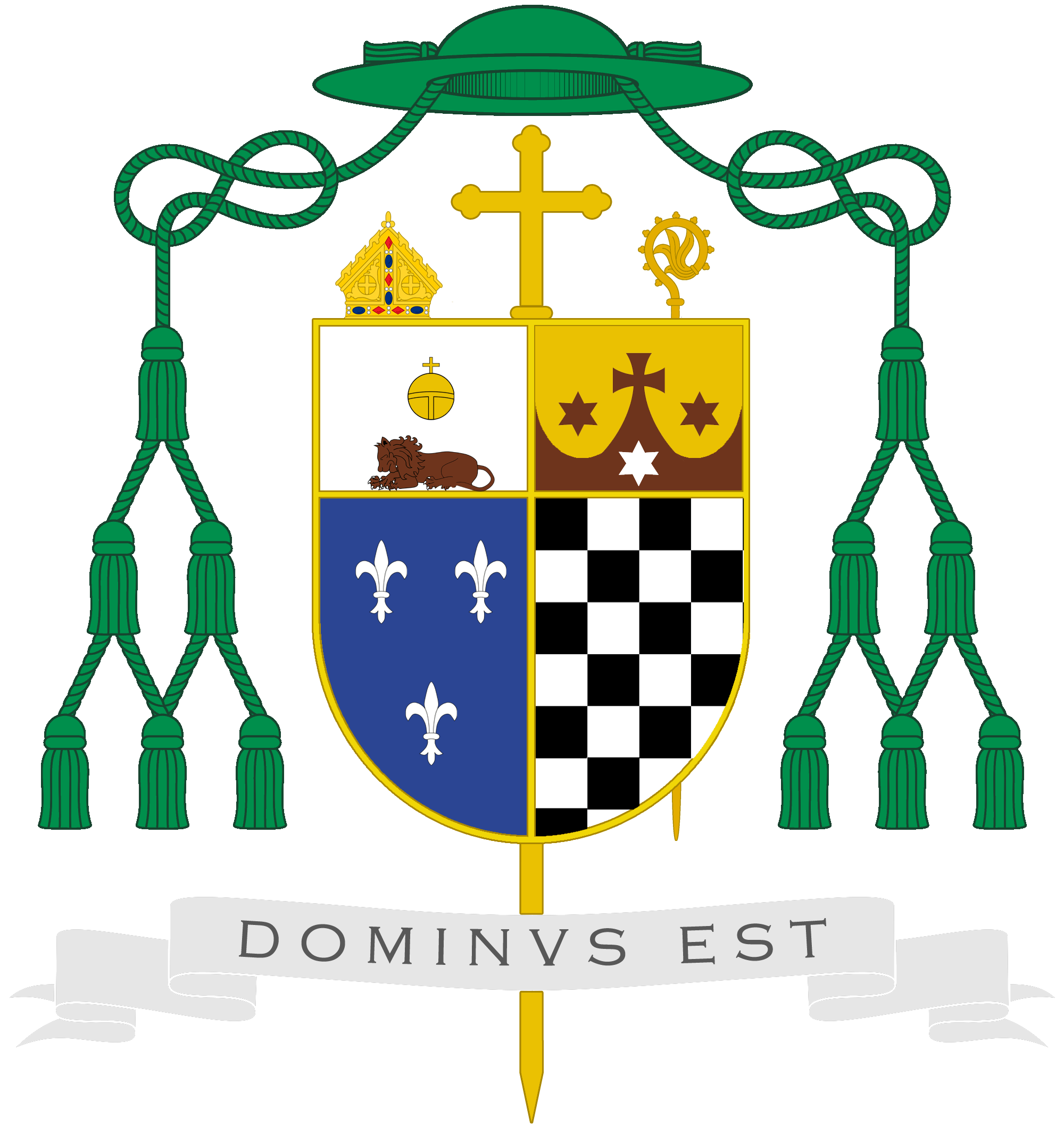
- Coat of arms: Julio Xavier Labayen's coat of arms

Ordination history
History
Priestly ordination
- Ordained by: Adeodato Giovanni Piazza OCD
Episcopal consecration
- Principal consecrator: Rufino Santos
- Co-consecrators: Alfredo Obviar; Pedro Bantigue

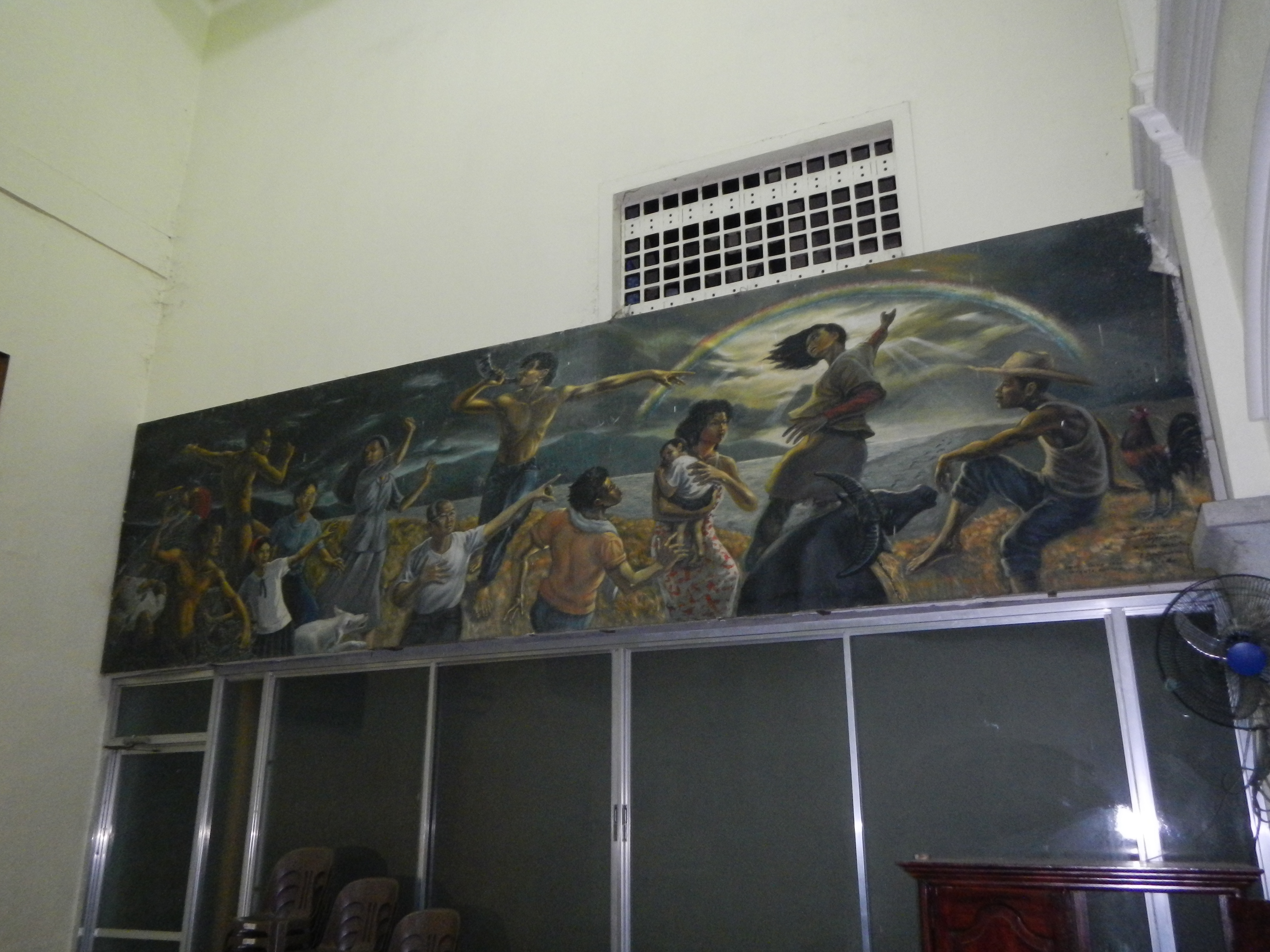
Bishop Labayen, OCD is portrayed in this mural entitled "Hope in Struggle" dressed simply in camisa de chino. He points towards the light and the rainbow, the "dream of the Father" leading the Church of the Poor.

The Most Reverend Julio Xavier Lizares Labayen Jr., OCD (July 23, 1926 – April 27, 2016) was a Filipino Catholic prelate. Known for his staunch defense of human rights, especially during martial law in the Philippines, he served as prelate of the Prelature of Infanta, Philippines from 1966 until 2003. He was among the first Filipino Discalced Carmelites in the 1950s. He was the first Filipino Discalced Carmelite bishop and the second bishop/prelate of Infanta.

== Early life and education ==
Julio Lizares Labayen was born on July 23, 1926 at Talisay, Negros Occidental. He was one of eight children of Julio Diaz Labayen and Mercedes Alunan Lizares. After finishing his primary and secondary education in Bacolod, he decided to enter the priesthood. While his parents consented, they still urged him to go to college first and "prove that he could do the things priests had to do." As a response to his parents' challenge, he joined the Eucharistic Crusade and taught catechism to their neighborhood.

During World War II, he organized a basketball league with then-Seminarian Antonio Fortich as coach; this made him a basketball superstar in their province.

After the war, he enrolled at the University of San Agustin in Iloilo City and majored in Arts. As a student, he became the captain of the university's basketball team, and a writer for the school paper. Around 1946, Labayen met then-Fr. Patrick Shanley, OCD, who was then serving as a military chaplain in the Philippines. This meeting made him interested in the Carmelites. A year after this meeting, he graduated with a Pre-Medicine degree.

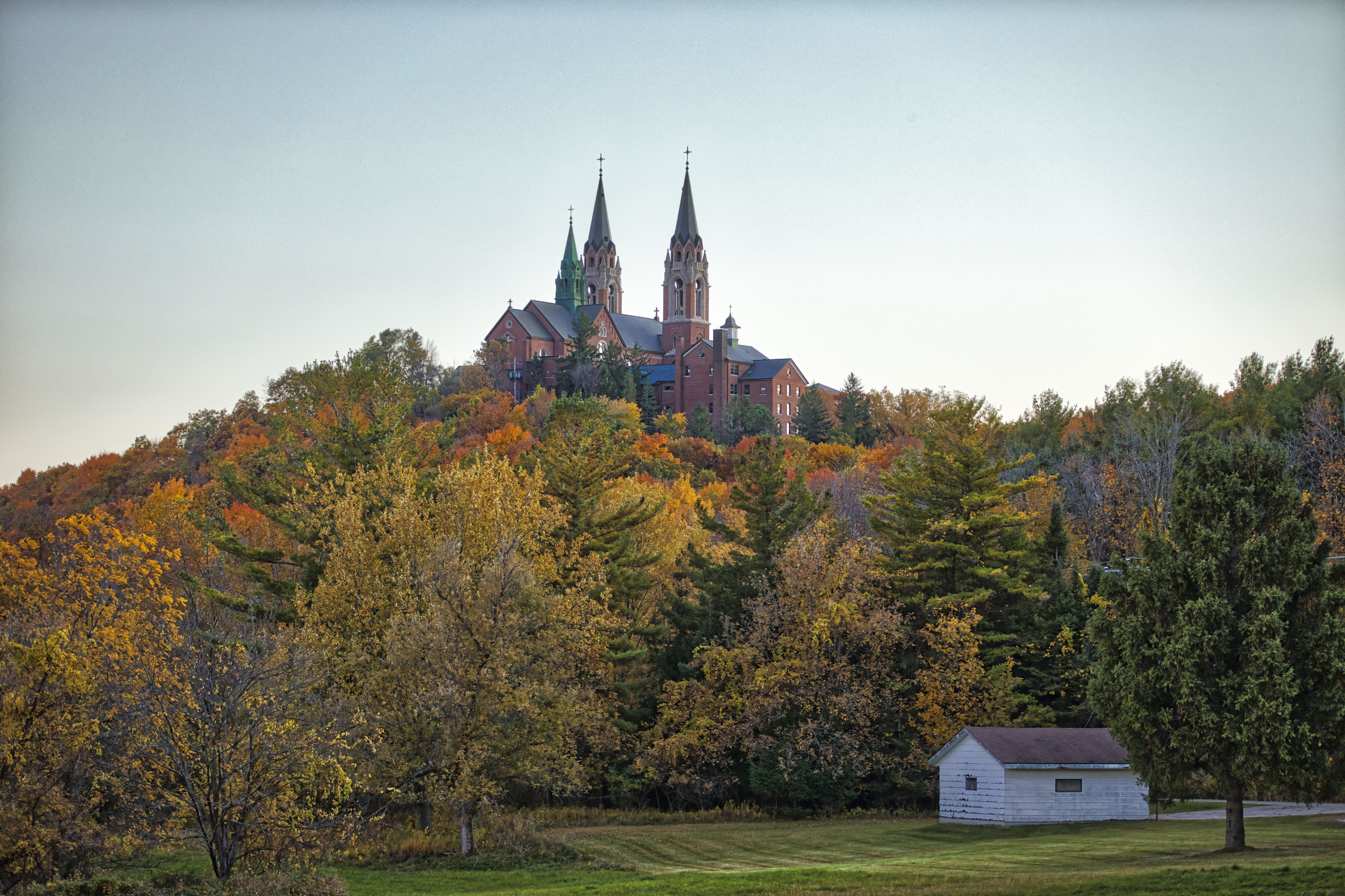
Holy Hill in Wisconsin, where Labayen finished his philosophy degree

After graduation, he decided to enter the Carmelites and made arrangements with Fr. Gabriel Gates, OCD for his admission. Labayen then studied Latin for a year at the Jesuit-run San Jose Seminary, and on September 22, 1948, he left the Philippines to join the Discalced Carmelites of the Washington Province of the Immaculate Heart of Mary. With him were other Filipino Carmelite aspirants, Vicente (later Fr. Bernard, OCD) Ybiernas and Pablo (later Fr. Anselm, OCD) Canonero. They formally entered the Order of Discalced Carmelites on October 15, 1948, the Feast of Santa Teresa de Jesús, at the Discalced Carmelites Novitiate in Brookline, Massachusetts. Consequently, he received the Carmelite habit on November 06, 1948 and took the religious name Xavier of the Immaculate Heart of Mary, and professed his simple vows on November 6, 1949.

As part of his seminary formation, Labayen took the courses needed towards priesthood. He studied philosophy (1949-1952) at Holy Hill, Milwaukee, Wisconsin, graduating magna cum laude. From the United States, he took his theology courses and earned a master's degree in Theology (1952-1957) from the Teresianum in Rome, finishing cum laude. Labayen's solemn profession of vows took place on May 14, 1953, also at the Teresianum. He was also made to study canon law after his priesthood at Angelicum. He finished his master's degree in canon law, summa cum laude in 1959.

== Ministry ==
Labayen was ordained on June 4, 1955, in the Teresianum by Cardinal Adeodato Giovanni Piazza. It was not until four years later that he was able to celebrate his first Solemn High Mass in Bacolod on November 14, 1949. As a priest, he was assigned as assistant parish priest of St. Joseph Parish in Polillo in 1959, then its parish priest the next year. He became apostolic administrator of the Prelature of Infanta on June 23, 1961.

On July 26, 1966, he was appointed by Pope Paul VI as territorial prelate of Infanta and titular bishop of Sinnuara. He was consecrated bishop on September 8, 1966, at the Our Lady of Mount Carmel Parish in New Manila, Quezon City. Manila Archbishop Rufino Cardinal Santos served was the principal consecrator, with Lucena Apostolic Administrator Bishop Alfredo Obviar and Manila Auxiliary Bishop Pedro Bantigue as co-consecrators. He was formally installed at the St. Mark's Cathedral in Infanta, Quezon by the Apostolic Nuncio to the Philippines Archbishop Carlo Martini.

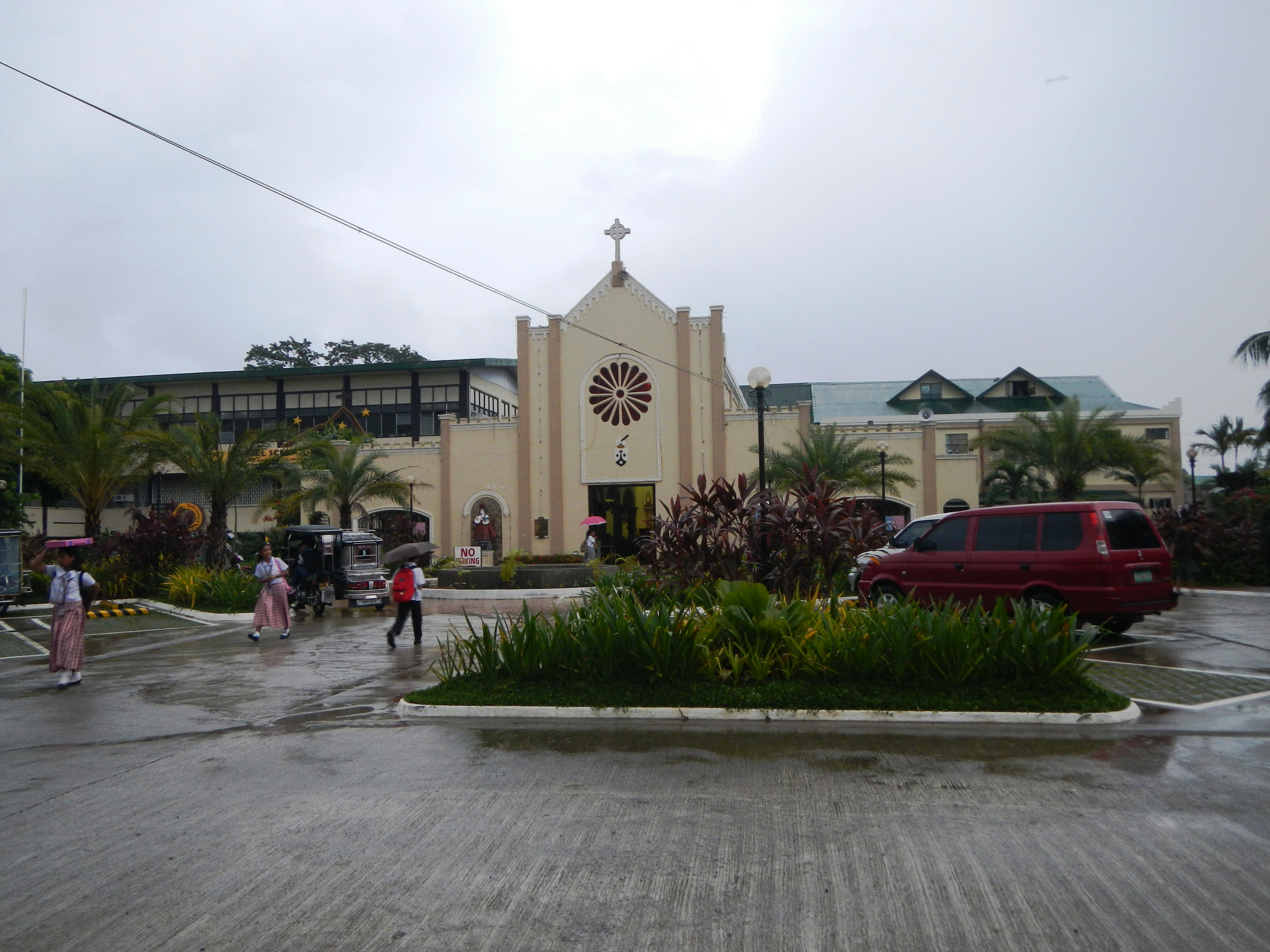
The Cathedral of the Prelature of Infanta

In the wake of the Second Vatican Council, Labayen was an ardent proponent of the Church of the Poor in the Philippines, which was his brainchild in the Prelature of Infanta. The program prioritized to serve those neglected by the society: workers, indigenous people and others who relied on no one but themselves. As a shepherd, he immersed himself with the people and established dialogue in the grassroots, a concept the laity never imagined to happen. As such he became close to the heart of the people who loved him as a father. He was a staunch defender of human rights, especially during the years of martial law in the Philippines, being known as one of the "Magnificent 7" who voiced their opposition to the Marcos regime.

Labayen also served in various capacities in promotion of the welfare and rights of the poor and the marginalized, primarily in his appointment as the first chair of the Catholic Bishops' Conference of the Philippines (CBCP)'s National Secretariat for Social Action-Justice and Peace (NASSA).

He also formed congregations to serve the church in their own ways. He was among the founders of the Rural Missionaries of the Philippines, the Apostles in Contemporary Times (1984), the Religious Community of the Alagad ni Maria (1990), the Franciscans of the Our Lady of the Poor (1990), and the Augustinian Missionaries of the Philippines (1999). He was also instrumental in the establishment of various non-government organizations, such as the Socio-Pastoral Institute, the Bishops-Businessmen's Conference, Tipan, the Integrated Alternative Medical Health Service (INAM), the Task Force Detainees of the Philippines (TDFP), the Management Organizing for Development and Empowerment (MODE), and the New Rural Bank of San Leonardo. He was also instrumental in the formation of the Community Organizing for People Empowerment (COPE), the Philippine Association of Human Rights Advocates (PAHRA), the Kilusang Makabayang Ekonomiya (KME), and the Development for Women Network (DAWN). In 1979, he formed the Karmelo – Laan sa Pangarap ng Ama (Sambayanan ng mga Dukha), an inculturated monastery of Discalced Carmelite nuns conceptualized in the spirit of the "Church of the Poor".

Labayen served the Prelature of Infanta until Pope John Paul II approved his retirement on June 28, 2003, with the announcement of the appointment of his Carmelite confrere, Malolos Bishop Rolando Tria Tirona. Labayen was the longest-serving Prelate of Infanta for 36 years.

== Death, burial, and commemoration ==
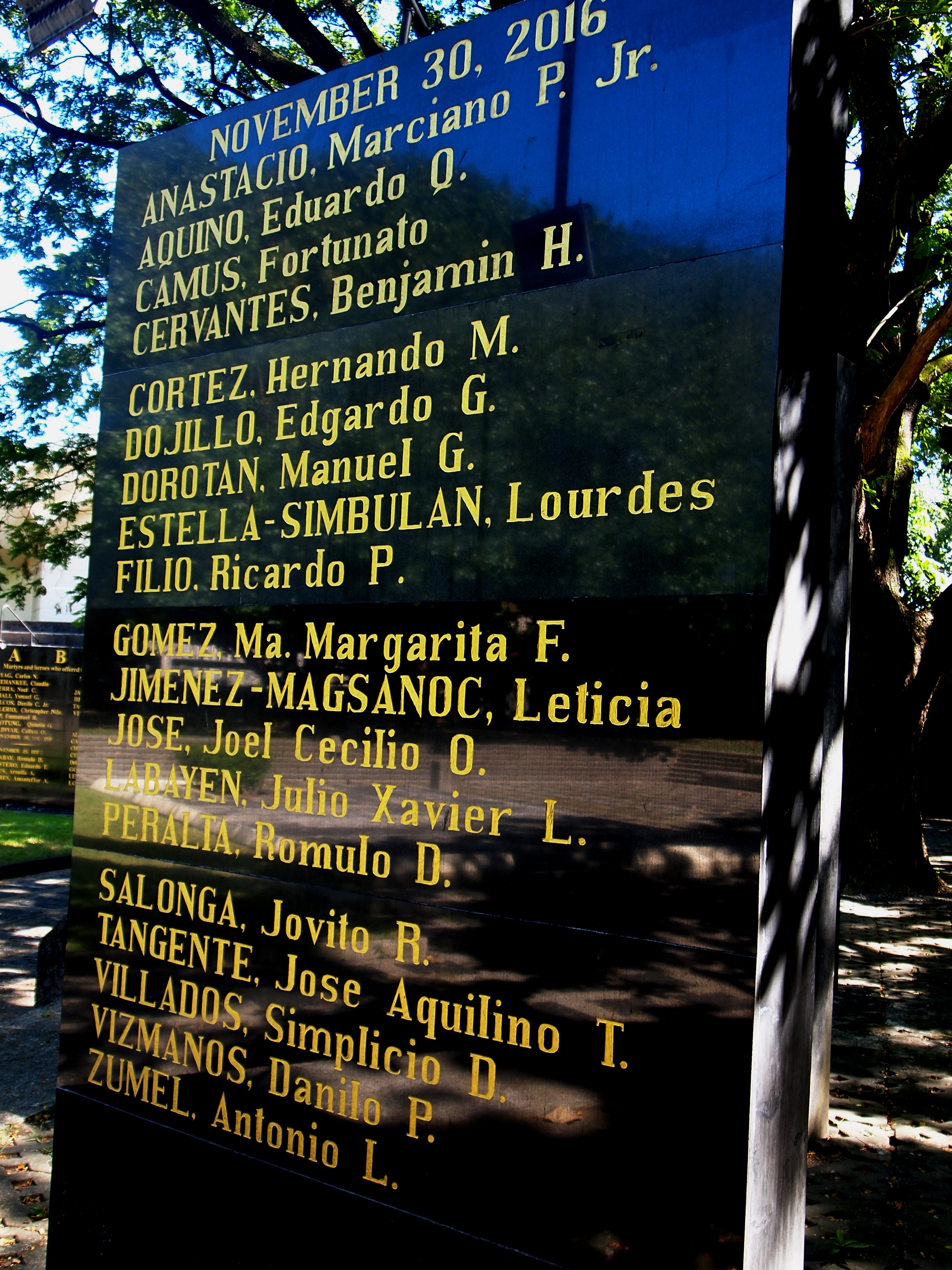
Detail of the Wall of Remembrance at the Bantayog ng mga Bayani, showing names from the 2016 batch of Bantayog Honorees, including that of Bishop Labayen

Labayen died on April 27, 2016, at 6:52 AM, in Manila. People poured from different walks of life during his wake in different locations: first in Quezon City, then to Baler, Aurora, and after to Infanta, Quezon. His remains were returned to his retirement place in Antipolo City where he was buried in a crypt under the congregation's chapel on May 3, 2016.

In recognition of his efforts against authoritarian rule, his name was inscribed on the Wall of Remembrance at the Bantayog ng mga Bayani in 2016.

== Coat-of-arms ==
The heraldry of Bishop Labayen was designed by Galo B. Ocampo.

The dexter side (left of the viewer) represents the Prelature of Infanta, according to the practice of combining the arms of the bishop with his territorial jurisdiction. On the chief of the dexter (upper left) are symbols of the titular patrons of the prelature: the orb (Infant Jesus of Prague) and the lion (Mark the Evangelist). On the base of the dexter (bottom left) is an azure background and fleur-de-lis representing the Blessed Virgin Mary and the three flowers symbolizing the Trinity.

The sinister side (right of the viewer) bears the personal blazon of the bishop. The chief of the sinister (upper right) is the arms of the Order of Discalced Carmelites to which the bishop belonged. On the base of the sinister (bottom right) is a sable and argent checkered which was the arms of the Labayen family.

His episcopal motto is "Dominus est" from John 21:7, in which the beloved disciple shouts "It is the Lord". This reflects a recognition of God in all circumstances of life.

== Authored works ==
These are the books written by Labayen among many talks, articles and seminars:

- Revolution and the Church of the Poor (revised by himself in 1995)
- To be the Church of the Poor (1986)
- The Bishop, Builder-Servant of the Church of the Poor (1991)
- Crisis and Impasse: the Dark Night in St. John of the Cross (1991)
- Incarnational Spirituality (2004)

== Awards ==
- Gawad Kagitingan Award (Valour Award) during the 106th anniversary of Philippine Independence at the Monument of Heroes in Quezon City, 2014
- Father Neri Satur Award for Environmental Heroism for Climate Change Mitigation, 2009, for the Adopt-a-Mountain in Infanta, Quezon program
- Human Rights Defenders Award, 2015, given by the Task Force Detainees of the Philippines
- Bishop Labayen Self-Integrity Scholarship for 10 four-year scholarships, given by the Metro Infanta Foundation, June 2002

=== Footnotes ===
Catholic Church titles
Preceded by Patrick Harmon Shanley, OCD	Prelate of Infanta; September 12, 1966 – June 28, 2003	Succeeded by Rolando Tria Tirona, OCD
Preceded by None	— TITULAR — Bishop of Sinnuara; September 8, 1966 – February 18, 1978	Succeeded by Peter Kurongku
