= List of Old World flycatcher species =

Old World flycatchers is the common name for the avian family Muscicapidae, which also includes the Old World chats. The International Ornithological Committee (IOC) recognizes these 357 species in the family, distributed among five subfamilies and 57 genera.

This list is presented according to the IOC taxonomic sequence and can also be sorted alphabetically by common name and binomial.

Common name	Binomial name + authority	IOC sequence
White-tailed alethe	Alethe diademata (Bonaparte, 1850)	1
Fire-crested alethe	Alethe castanea (Cassin, 1856)	2
Karoo scrub robin	Tychaedon coryphoeus (Vieillot, 1817)	3
Brown scrub robin	Tychaedon signata (Sundevall, 1850)	4
Forest scrub robin	Tychaedon leucosticta (Sharpe, 1883)	5
Bearded scrub robin	Tychaedon quadrivirgata (Reichenow, 1879)	6
Miombo scrub robin	Tychaedon barbata (Hartlaub & Finsch, 1870)	7
Kalahari scrub robin	Cercotrichas paena (Smith, A, 1836)	8
Black scrub robin	Cercotrichas podobe (Müller, PLS, 1776)	9
Rufous-tailed scrub robin	Cercotrichas galactotes (Temminck, 1820)	10
Brown-backed scrub robin	Cercotrichas hartlaubi (Reichenow, 1891)	11
White-browed scrub robin	Cercotrichas leucophrys (Vieillot, 1817)	12
Oriental magpie-robin	Copsychus saularis (Linnaeus, 1758)	13
Seychelles magpie-robin	Copsychus sechellarum Newton, A, 1865	14
Philippine magpie-robin	Copsychus mindanensis (Boddaert, 1783)	15
Madagascar magpie-robin	Copsychus albospecularis (Eydoux & Gervais, 1836)	16
Rufous-tailed shama	Copsychus pyrropygus (Lesson, RP, 1839)	17
Indian robin	Copsychus fulicatus (Linnaeus, 1766)	18
White-browed shama	Copsychus luzoniensis (Kittlitz, 1832)	19
Visayan shama	Copsychus superciliaris (Bourns & Worcester, 1894)	20
White-vented shama	Copsychus niger (Sharpe, 1877)	21
Black shama	Copsychus cebuensis (Steere, 1890)	22
Andaman shama	Copsychus albiventris (Blyth, 1858)	23
Larwo shama	Copsychus omissus (Hartert, EJO, 1902	24
White-crowned shama	Copsychus stricklandii Motley & Dillwyn, 1855	25
Maratua shama (extinct in the wild)	Copsychus barbouri (Bangs & Peters, JL), 1927	26
Kangean shama (probably extinct in the wild	Copsychus nigricauda (Vorderman, 1893)	27
Sri Lanka shama	Copsychus leggei (Whistler, 1941)	28
White-rumped shama	Copsychus malabaricus (Scopoli, 1786)	29
Pale flycatcher	Agricola pallidus (Müller, JW, 1851)	30
Chat flycatcher	Agricola infuscatus (Smith, A, 1839)	31
White-browed forest flycatcher	Fraseria cinerascens Hartlaub, 1857	32
Fraser's forest flycatcher	Fraseria ocreata (Strickland, 1844)	33
Grey-throated tit-flycatcher	Fraseria griseigularis (Jackson, FJ, 1906)	34
Grey tit-flycatcher	Fraseria plumbea (Hartlaub, 1858)	35
Olivaceous flycatcher	Fraseria olivascens (Cassin, 1859)	36
Chapin's flycatcher	Fraseria lendu (Chapin, 1932)	37
Ashy flycatcher	Fraseria caerulescens (Hartlaub, 1865)	38
Tessmann's flycatcher	Fraseria tessmanni (Reichenow, 1907)	39
Angola slaty flycatcher	Melaenornis brunneus (Cabanis, 1886)	40
White-eyed slaty flycatcher	Melaenornis fischeri (Reichenow, 1884)	41
Abyssinian slaty flycatcher	Melaenornis chocolatinus (Rüppell, 1840)	42
Nimba flycatcher	Melaenornis annamarulae Forbes-Watson, 1970	43
Yellow-eyed black flycatcher	Melaenornis ardesiacus Berlioz, 1936	44
Northern black flycatcher	Melaenornis edolioides (Swainson, 1837)	45
Southern black flycatcher	Melaenornis pammelaina (Stanley, 1814)	46
Herero chat	Namibornis herero (Meyer de Schauensee, 1931)	47
Silverbird	Empidornis semipartitus (Rüppell, 1840)	48
Fiscal flycatcher	Sigelus silens (Shaw, 1809)	49
Dusky-blue flycatcher	Bradornis comitatus (Cassin, 1857)	50
African grey flycatcher	Bradornis microrhynchus Reichenow, 1887	51
Marico flycatcher	Bradornis mariquensis Smith, A, 1847	52
Böhm's flycatcher	Myopornis boehmi Reichenow, 1884	53
Ussher's flycatcher	Artomyias ussheri (Sharpe, 1871)	54
Sooty flycatcher	Artomyias fuliginosus (Verreaux, J & Verreaux, É, 1855)	55
Humblot's flycatcher	Humblotia flavirostris Milne-Edwards & Oustalet, 1885	56
Grey-streaked flycatcher	Muscicapa griseisticta (Swinhoe, 1861)	57
Dark-sided flycatcher	Muscicapa sibirica Gmelin, JF, 1789	58
Ferruginous flycatcher	Muscicapa ferruginea (Hodgson, 1845)	59
Brown-breasted flycatcher	Muscicapa muttui (Layard, EL, 1854)	60
Ashy-breasted flycatcher	Muscicapa randi Amadon & duPont, 1970	61
Sumba brown flycatcher	Muscicapa segregata (Siebers, 1928)	62
Asian brown flycatcher	Muscicapa dauurica Pallas, 1811	63
Brown-streaked flycatcher	Muscicapa williamsoni Deignan, 1957	64
Sulawesi streaked flycatcher	Muscicapa sodhii Harris, JBC, Rasmussen, Yong, Prawiradilaga, Putra, Round & Rheindt, 2014	65
Yellow-footed flycatcher	Muscicapa sethsmithi (Van Someren, 1922)	66
Little grey flycatcher	Muscicapa epulata (Cassin, 1855)	67
African dusky flycatcher	Muscicapa adusta (Boie, F, 1828)	68
Spotted flycatcher	Muscicapa striata (Pallas, 1764)	69
Mediterranean flycatcher	Muscicapa tyrrhenica Schiebel, 1910	70
Gambaga flycatcher	Muscicapa gambagae (Alexander, 1901)	71
Cassin's flycatcher	Muscicapa cassini Heine, 1860	72
Swamp flycatcher	Muscicapa aquatica Heuglin, 1864	73
White-tailed flycatcher	Leucoptilon concretum (Müller, S, 1836)	74
Nilgiri blue robin	Sholicola major (Jerdon, 1841)	75
White-bellied blue robin	Sholicola albiventris (Blanford, 1868)	76
Fujian niltava	Niltava davidi La Touche, 1907	77
Rufous-bellied niltava	Niltava sundara Hodgson, 1837	78
Rufous-vented niltava	Niltava sumatrana Salvadori, 1879	79
Chinese vivid niltava	Niltava oatesi Salvadori, 1887	80
Taiwan vivid niltava	Niltava vivida (Swinhoe, 1864)	81
Small niltava	Niltava macgrigoriae (Burton, E, 1836)	82
Large niltava	Niltava grandis (Blyth, 1842)	83
Blue-and-white flycatcher	Cyanoptila cyanomelana (Temminck, 1829)	84
Zappey's flycatcher	Cyanoptila cumatilis Thayer & Bangs, 1909	85
Nilgiri flycatcher	Eumyias albicaudatus (Jerdon, 1840)	86
Indigo flycatcher	Eumyias indigo (Horsfield, 1821)	87
Verditer flycatcher	Eumyias thalassinus (Swainson, 1838)	88
Buru jungle flycatcher	Eumyias additus (Hartert, EJO, 1900)	89
Turquoise flycatcher	Eumyias panayensis Sharpe, 1877	90
Matinan blue flycatcher	Eumyias sanfordi (Stresemann, 1931)	91
Blue-fronted blue flycatcher	Eumyias hoevelli (Meyer, AB, 1903)	92
Timor blue flycatcher	Eumyias hyacinthinus (Temminck, 1820)	93
Flores jungle flycatcher	Eumyias oscillans (Hartert, EJO, 1897)	94
Sumba jungle flycatcher	Eumyias stresemanni (Siebers, 1928)	95
Dull-blue flycatcher	Eumyias sordidus (Walden, 1870)	96
White-gorgeted flycatcher	Anthipes monileger (Hodgson, 1845)	97
Rufous-browed flycatcher	Anthipes solitaris (Müller, S, 1836)	98
Pale blue flycatcher	Cyornis unicolor Blyth, 1843	99
Chinese blue flycatcher	Cyornis glaucicomans Thayer & Bangs, 1909	100
Blue-throated blue flycatcher	Cyornis rubeculoides (Vigors, 1831)	101
Hainan blue flycatcher	Cyornis hainanus (Ogilvie-Grant, 1900)	102
Bornean blue flycatcher	Cyornis superbus Stresemann, 1925	103
Malaysian blue flycatcher	Cyornis turcosus Brüggemann, 1877	104
Palawan blue flycatcher	Cyornis lemprieri (Sharpe, 1884)	105
Sunda blue flycatcher	Cyornis caerulatus (Bonaparte, 1857)	106
Blue-breasted blue flycatcher	Cyornis herioti Wardlaw-Ramsay, RG, 1886	107
Rufous-breasted blue flycatcher	Cyornis camarinensis (Rand & Rabor, 1967)	108
Philippine jungle flycatcher	Cyornis ruficauda (Sharpe, 1877)	109
Sulu jungle flycatcher	Cyornis ocularis (Bourns & Worcester, 1894)	110
Crocker jungle flycatcher	Cyornis ruficrissa (Sharpe, 1887)	111
White-bellied blue flycatcher	Cyornis pallidipes (Jerdon, 1840)	112
Brown-chested jungle flycatcher	Cyornis brunneatus (Slater, HH, 1897)	113
Nicobar jungle flycatcher	Cyornis nicobaricus (Richmond, 1902)	114
Grey-chested jungle flycatcher	Cyornis umbratilis (Strickland, 1849)	115
Large blue flycatcher	Cyornis magnirostris Blyth, 1849	116
Tickell's blue flycatcher	Cyornis tickelliae Blyth, 1843	117
Indochinese blue flycatcher	Cyornis sumatrensis (Sharpe, 1879)	118
Hill blue flycatcher	Cyornis whitei Harington, 1908	119
Mangrove blue flycatcher	Cyornis rufigastra (Raffles, 1822)	120
Sulawesi blue flycatcher	Cyornis omissus (Hartert, EJO, 1896)	121
Kalao blue flycatcher	Cyornis kalaoensis (Hartert, EJO, 1896)	122
Javan blue flycatcher	Cyornis banyumas (Horsfield, 1821)	123
Dayak blue flycatcher	Cyornis montanus Robinson & Kinnear, 1928	124
Meratus blue flycatcher	Cyornis kadayangensis Irham, Haryoko, Shakya, Mitchell, S, Burner, Bocos, Eaton, Rheindt, Suparno, Sheldon & Prawiradilaga, 2021	125
Pale-chinned flycatcher	Cyornis poliogenys Brooks, WE, 1880	126
Fulvous-chested jungle flycatcher	Cyornis olivaceus Hume, 1877	127
Banggai jungle flycatcher	Cyornis pelingensis (Vaurie, 1952)	128
Sula jungle flycatcher	Cyornis colonus (Hartert, EJO, 1898)	129
Rück's blue flycatcher	Cyornis ruckii (Oustalet, 1881)	130
European robin	Erithacus rubecula (Linnaeus, 1758)	131
Swynnerton's robin	Swynnertonia swynnertoni (Shelley, 1906)	132
White-starred robin	Pogonocichla stellata (Vieillot, 1818)	133
Orange-breasted forest robin	Stiphrornis erythrothorax Hartlaub, 1855	134
Yellow-breasted forest robin	Stiphrornis xanthogaster Sharpe, 1903	135
Olive-backed forest robin	Stiphrornis pyrrholaemus Schmidt & Angehr, 2008	136
White-bellied robin-chat	Cossyphicula roberti (Alexander, 1903)	137
Mountain robin-chat	Cossyphicula isabellae (Gray, GR, 1862)	138
Red-throated alethe	Chamaetylas poliophrys (Sharpe, 1902)	139
Brown-chested alethe	Chamaetylas poliocephala (Bonaparte, 1850)	140
White-chested alethe	Chamaetylas fuelleborni (Reichenow, 1900)	141
Thyolo alethe	Chamaetylas choloensis (Sclater, WL, 1927)	142
White-crowned robin-chat	Cossypha albicapillus (Vieillot, 1818)	143
White-browed robin-chat	Cossypha heuglini Hartlaub, 1866	144
Chorister robin-chat	Cossypha dichroa (Gmelin, JF, 1789)	145
Rüppell's robin-chat	Cossypha semirufa (Rüppell, 1837)	146
Snowy-crowned robin-chat	Cossypha niveicapilla (Lafresnaye, 1838)	147
Red-capped robin-chat	Cossypha natalensis Smith, A, 1840	148
White-headed robin-chat	Cossypha heinrichi Rand, 1955	149
Blue-shouldered robin-chat	Cossypha cyanocampter (Bonaparte, 1850)	150
Collared palm thrush	Cichladusa arquata Peters, W, 1863	151
Rufous-tailed palm thrush	Cichladusa ruficauda (Hartlaub, 1857)	152
Spotted palm thrush	Cichladusa guttata (Heuglin, 1862)	153
Angola cave chat	Xenocopsychus ansorgei Hartert, EJO, 1907	154
White-throated robin-chat	Dessonornis humeralis Smith, A, 1836	155
Cape robin-chat	Dessonornis caffer (Linnaeus, 1771)	156
Archer's ground robin	Dessonornis archeri (Sharpe, 1902)	157
Olive-flanked ground robin	Dessonornis anomalus (Shelley, 1893)	158
Usambara akalat	Sheppardia montana (Reichenow, 1907)	159
Iringa akalat	Sheppardia lowei (Grant, CHB & Mackworth-Praed, 1941)	160
Rubeho akalat	Sheppardia aurantiithorax Beresford, Fjeldså & Kiure, 2004	161
East coast akalat	Sheppardia gunningi Haagner, 1909	162
Sharpe's akalat	Sheppardia sharpei (Shelley, 1903)	163
Bocage's akalat	Sheppardia bocagei (Finsch & Hartlaub, 1870)	164
Short-tailed akalat	Sheppardia poensis (Alexander, 1903)	165
Lowland akalat	Sheppardia cyornithopsis (Sharpe, 1901)	166
Equatorial akalat	Sheppardia aequatorialis (Jackson, FJ, 1906)	167
Gabela akalat	Sheppardia gabela (Rand, 1957)	168
Grey-winged robin-chat	Sheppardia polioptera (Reichenow, 1892)	169
White-throated robin	Irania gutturalis (Guérin-Méneville, 1843)	170
Thrush nightingale	Luscinia luscinia (Linnaeus, 1758)	171
Common nightingale	Luscinia megarhynchos Brehm, CL, 1831	172
Bluethroat	Luscinia svecica (Linnaeus, 1758)	173
White-bellied redstart	Luscinia phaenicuroides (Gray, JE & Gray, GR, 1847)	174
White-tailed robin	Myiomela leucura (Hodgson, 1845)	175
Sumatran blue robin	Myiomela sumatrana (Robinson & Kloss, 1918)	176
Javan blue robin	Myiomela diana (Lesson, RP, 1831)	177
Blackthroat	Calliope obscura (Berezowski & Bianchi, 1891)	178
Firethroat	Calliope pectardens David, A, 1877	179
Siberian rubythroat	Calliope calliope (Pallas, 1776)	180
Himalayan rubythroat	Calliope pectoralis Gould, 1837	181
Chinese rubythroat	Calliope tschebaiewi Przevalski, 1876	182
Little forktail	Enicurus scouleri Vigors, 1832	183
Black-backed forktail	Enicurus immaculatus (Hodgson, 1836)	184
Slaty-backed forktail	Enicurus schistaceus (Hodgson, 1836)	185
Spotted forktail	Enicurus maculatus Vigors, 1831	186
White-crowned forktail	Enicurus leschenaulti (Vieillot, 1818)	187
Bornean forktail	Enicurus borneensis Sharpe, 1889	188
Chestnut-naped forktail	Enicurus ruficapillus Temminck, 1832	189
Sunda forktail	Enicurus velatus Temminck, 1822	190
Blue-fronted robin	Cinclidium frontale Blyth, 1842	191
Taiwan whistling thrush	Myophonus insularis Gould, 1863	192
Shiny whistling thrush	Myophonus melanurus (Salvadori, 1879)	193
Brown-winged whistling thrush	Myophonus castaneus Wardlaw-Ramsay, RG, 1880	194
Blue whistling thrush	Myophonus caeruleus (Scopoli, 1786)	195
Javan whistling thrush	Myophonus glaucinus (Temminck, 1823)	196
Bornean whistling thrush	Myophonus borneensis Slater, HH, 1885	197
Malayan whistling thrush	Myophonus robinsoni Ogilvie-Grant, 1905	198
Malabar whistling thrush	Myophonus horsfieldii Vigors, 1831	199
Sri Lanka whistling thrush	Myophonus blighi (Holdsworth, 1872)	200
Great shortwing	Heinrichia calligyna Stresemann, 1931	201
Eyebrowed jungle flycatcher	Vauriella gularis (Sharpe, 1888)	202
White-throated jungle flycatcher	Vauriella albigularis (Bourns & Worcester, 1894)	203
White-browed jungle flycatcher	Vauriella insignis (Ogilvie-Grant, 1895)	204
Slaty-backed jungle flycatcher	Vauriella goodfellowi (Ogilvie-Grant, 1905)	205
Bagobo babbler	Leonardina woodi (Mearns, 1905)	206
Himalayan shortwing	Brachypteryx cruralis (Blyth, 1843)	207
Chinese shortwing	Brachypteryx sinensis Rickett, 1897	208
Taiwan shortwing	Brachypteryx goodfellowi Ogilvie-Grant, 1912	209
Rusty-bellied shortwing	Brachypteryx hyperythra Blyth, 1861	210
Lesser shortwing	Brachypteryx leucophris (Temminck, 1828)	211
Philippine shortwing	Brachypteryx poliogyna Ogilvie-Grant, 1895	212
Bornean shortwing	Brachypteryx erythrogyna Sharpe, 1888	213
Sumatran shortwing	Brachypteryx saturata Salvadori, 1879	214
Javan shortwing	Brachypteryx montana Horsfield, 1821	215
Flores shortwing	Brachypteryx floris Hartert, EJO, 1897	216
Siberian blue robin	Larvivora cyane (Pallas, 1776)	217
Indian blue robin	Larvivora brunnea Hodgson, 1837	218
Japanese robin	Larvivora akahige (Temminck, 1835)	219
Izu robin	Larvivora tanensis (Kuroda, Nm, 1923)	220
Ryukyu robin	Larvivora komadori (Temminck, 1835)	221
Okinawa robin	Larvivora namiyei (Stejneger, 1887)	222
Rufous-tailed robin	Larvivora sibilans Swinhoe, 1863	223
Rufous-headed robin	Larvivora ruficeps Hartert, EJO, 1907	224
Yellow-rumped flycatcher	Ficedula zanthopygia (Hay, 1845)	225
Green-backed flycatcher	Ficedula elisae (Weigold, 1922)	226
Narcissus flycatcher	Ficedula narcissina (Temminck, 1836)	227
Ryukyu flycatcher	Ficedula owstoni (Bangs, 1901)	228
Slaty-blue flycatcher	Ficedula tricolor (Hodgson, 1845)	229
Snowy-browed flycatcher	Ficedula hyperythra (Blyth, 1843)	230
Mugimaki flycatcher	Ficedula mugimaki (Temminck, 1836)	231
Slaty-backed flycatcher	Ficedula erithacus (Blyth, 1861)	232
Pygmy flycatcher	Ficedula hodgsoni (Moore, F, 1854)	233
Rufous-gorgeted flycatcher	Ficedula strophiata (Hodgson, 1837)	234
Sapphire flycatcher	Ficedula sapphira (Blyth, 1843)	235
Ultramarine flycatcher	Ficedula superciliaris (Jerdon, 1840)	236
Little pied flycatcher	Ficedula westermanni (Sharpe, 1888)	237
Rusty-tailed flycatcher	Ficedula ruficauda (Swainson, 1838)	238
Kashmir flycatcher	Ficedula subrubra (Hartert, EJO & Steinbacher, 1934)	239
Red-breasted flycatcher	Ficedula parva (Bechstein, 1792)	240
Taiga flycatcher	Ficedula albicilla (Pallas, 1811)	241
Semicollared flycatcher	Ficedula semitorquata (Homeyer, 1885)	242
Atlas pied flycatcher	Ficedula speculigera (Bonaparte, 1850)	243
European pied flycatcher	Ficedula hypoleuca (Pallas, 1764)	244
Collared flycatcher	Ficedula albicollis (Temminck, 1815)	245
Black-and-orange flycatcher	Ficedula nigrorufa (Jerdon, 1839)	246
Tanimbar flycatcher	Ficedula riedeli (Büttikofer, 1886)	247
Rufous-chested flycatcher	Ficedula dumetoria (Wallace, 1864)	248
Furtive flycatcher	Ficedula disposita (Ripley & Marshall, JT Jr, 1967)	249
Palawan flycatcher	Ficedula platenae (Blasius, W, 1888)	250
Rufous-throated flycatcher	Ficedula rufigula (Wallace, 1865)	251
Cinnamon-chested flycatcher	Ficedula buruensis (Hartert, EJO, 1899)	252
Sumba flycatcher	Ficedula harterti (Siebers, 1928)	253
Black-banded flycatcher	Ficedula timorensis (Hellmayr, 1919)	254
Little slaty flycatcher	Ficedula basilanica (Sharpe, 1877)	255
Bundok flycatcher	Ficedula luzoniensis (Ogilvie-Grant, 1894)	256
Cryptic flycatcher	Ficedula crypta (Vaurie, 1951)	257
Lompobattang flycatcher	Ficedula bonthaina (Hartert, EJO, 1896)	258
Damar flycatcher	Ficedula henrici (Hartert, EJO, 1899)	259
White-browed bush robin	Tarsiger indicus (Vieillot, 1817)	260
Taiwan bush robin	Tarsiger formosanus Hartert, EJO, 1910	261
Golden bush robin	Tarsiger chrysaeus Hodgson, 1845	262
Collared bush robin	Tarsiger johnstoniae (Ogilvie-Grant, 1906)	263
Rufous-breasted bush robin	Tarsiger hyperythrus (Blyth, 1847)	264
Red-flanked bluetail	Tarsiger cyanurus (Pallas, 1773)	265
Qilian bluetail	Tarsiger albocoeruleus Meise, 1937	266
Himalayan bluetail	Tarsiger rufilatus (Hodgson, 1845)	267
Gould's shortwing	Heteroxenicus stellatus (Gould, 1868)	268
Eversmann's redstart	Phoenicurus erythronotus (Eversmann, 1841)	269
Blue-fronted redstart	Phoenicurus frontalis Vigors, 1831	270
Blue-capped redstart	Phoenicurus coeruleocephala (Vigors, 1831)	271
White-throated redstart	Phoenicurus schisticeps (Gray, JE & Gray, GR, 1847)	272
Plumbeous water redstart	Phoenicurus fuliginosus Vigors, 1831	273
Luzon water redstart	Phoenicurus bicolor (Ogilvie-Grant, 1894)	274
White-capped redstart	Phoenicurus leucocephalus Vigors, 1831	275
Przevalski's redstart	Phoenicurus alaschanicus (Przevalski, 1876)	276
Black redstart	Phoenicurus ochruros (Gmelin, SG, 1774)	277
Common redstart	Phoenicurus phoenicurus (Linnaeus, 1758)	278
Moussier's redstart	Phoenicurus moussieri (Olphe-Galliard, 1852)	279
Daurian redstart	Phoenicurus auroreus (Pallas, 1776)	280
Hodgson's redstart	Phoenicurus hodgsoni (Moore, F, 1854)	281
Güldenstädt's redstart	Phoenicurus erythrogastrus (Güldenstädt, 1775)	282
Blue-capped rock thrush	Monticola cinclorhyncha (Vigors, 1831)	283
White-throated rock thrush	Monticola gularis (Swinhoe, 1863)	284
Chestnut-bellied rock thrush	Monticola rufiventris (Jardine & Selby, 1833)	285
Short-toed rock thrush	Monticola brevipes (Waterhouse, 1838)	286
Sentinel rock thrush	Monticola explorator (Vieillot, 1818)	287
Amber Mountain rock thrush	Monticola erythronotus (Lavauden, 1929)	288
Forest rock thrush	Monticola sharpei (Gray, GR, 1871)	289
Littoral rock thrush	Monticola imerina (Hartlaub, 1860)	290
Little rock thrush	Monticola rufocinereus (Rüppell, 1837)	291
Common rock thrush	Monticola saxatilis (Linnaeus, 1766)	292
Blue rock thrush	Monticola solitarius (Linnaeus, 1758)	293
White-winged cliff chat	Monticola semirufus (Rüppell, 1837)	294
Cape rock thrush	Monticola rupestris (Vieillot, 1818)	295
Miombo rock thrush	Monticola angolensis de Sousa, JA, 1888	296
Jerdon's bush chat	Saxicola jerdoni (Blyth, 1867)	297
Grey bush chat	Saxicola ferreus Gray, JE & Gray, GR, 1847	298
Whinchat	Saxicola rubetra (Linnaeus, 1758)	299
White-browed bush chat	Saxicola macrorhynchus (Stoliczka, 1872)	300
White-bellied bush chat	Saxicola gutturalis (Vieillot, 1818)	301
Pied bush chat	Saxicola caprata (Linnaeus, 1766)	302
White-throated bush chat	Saxicola insignis Gray, JE & Gray, GR, 1847	303
White-tailed stonechat	Saxicola leucurus (Blyth, 1847)	304
Amur stonechat	Saxicola stejnegeri (Parrot, 1908)	305
African stonechat	Saxicola torquatus (Linnaeus, 1766)	306
Reunion stonechat	Saxicola tectes (Gmelin, JF, 1789)	307
Siberian stonechat	Saxicola maurus (Pallas, 1773)	308
European stonechat	Saxicola rubicola (Linnaeus, 1766)	309
Canary Islands stonechat	Saxicola dacotiae (Meade-Waldo, 1889)	310
Buff-streaked chat	Campicoloides bifasciatus (Temminck, 1829)	311
Karoo chat	Emarginata schlegelii (Wahlberg, 1855)	312
Tractrac chat	Emarginata tractrac (Wilkes, 1817)	313
Sickle-winged chat	Emarginata sinuata (Sundevall, 1858)	314
Moorland chat	Pinarochroa sordida (Rüppell, 1837)	315
Mocking cliff chat	Thamnolaea cinnamomeiventris (Lafresnaye, 1836)	316
Anteater chat	Myrmecocichla aethiops Cabanis, 1851	317
Congo moor chat	Myrmecocichla tholloni (Oustalet, 1886)	318
Ant-eating chat	Myrmecocichla formicivora (Wilkes, 1817)	319
Mountain chat	Myrmecocichla monticola (Vieillot, 1818)	320
Sooty chat	Myrmecocichla nigra (Vieillot, 1818)	321
Rüppell's black chat	Myrmecocichla melaena (Rüppell, 1837)	322
Ruaha chat	Myrmecocichla collaris Reichenow, 1882	323
Arnot's chat	Myrmecocichla arnotti (Tristram, 1869)	324
Northern wheatear	Oenanthe oenanthe (Linnaeus, 1758)	325
Atlas wheatear	Oenanthe seebohmi (Dixon, 1882)	326
Capped wheatear	Oenanthe pileata (Gmelin, JF, 1789)	327
Buff-breasted wheatear	Oenanthe bottae (Bonaparte, 1854)	328
Rusty-breasted wheatear	Oenanthe frenata (Heuglin, 1869)	329
Isabelline wheatear	Oenanthe isabellina (Temminck, 1829)	330
Heuglin's wheatear	Oenanthe heuglinii (Heuglin, 1869)	331
Hooded wheatear	Oenanthe monacha (Temminck, 1825)	332
Desert wheatear	Oenanthe deserti (Temminck, 1825)	333
Western black-eared wheatear	Oenanthe hispanica (Linnaeus, 1758)	334
Pied wheatear	Oenanthe pleschanka (Lepechin, 1770)	335
Eastern black-eared wheatear	Oenanthe melanoleuca (Güldenstädt, 1775)	336
Cyprus wheatear	Oenanthe cypriaca (Homeyer, 1885)	337
White-fronted black chat	Oenanthe albifrons (Rüppell, 1837)	338
Somali wheatear	Oenanthe phillipsi (Shelley, 1885)	339
Red-rumped wheatear	Oenanthe moesta (Lichtenstein, MHC, 1823)	340
Blackstart	Oenanthe melanura (Temminck, 1824)	341
Familiar chat	Oenanthe familiaris (Wilkes, 1817)	342
Brown-tailed rock chat	Oenanthe scotocerca (Heuglin, 1869)	343
Sombre rock chat	Oenanthe dubia (Blundell & Lovat, 1899)	344
Brown rock chat	Oenanthe fusca (Blyth, 1851)	345
Variable wheatear	Oenanthe picata (Blyth, 1847)	346
Finsch's wheatear	Oenanthe finschii (Heuglin, 1869)	347
Maghreb wheatear	Oenanthe halophila (Tristram, 1859)	348
Mourning wheatear	Oenanthe lugens (Lichtenstein, MHC, 1823)	349
Basalt wheatear	Oenanthe warriae Shirihai & Kirwan, 2011	350
Kurdish wheatear	Oenanthe xanthoprymna (Hemprich & Ehrenberg, 1833)	351
Red-tailed wheatear	Oenanthe chrysopygia (de Filippi, 1863)	352
White-crowned wheatear	Oenanthe leucopyga (Brehm, CL, 1855)	353
Hume's wheatear	Oenanthe albonigra (Hume, 1872)	354
Black wheatear	Oenanthe leucura (Gmelin, JF, 1789)	355
Abyssinian wheatear	Oenanthe lugubris (Rüppell, 1837)	356
Arabian wheatear	Oenanthe lugentoides (Seebohm, 1881)	357
