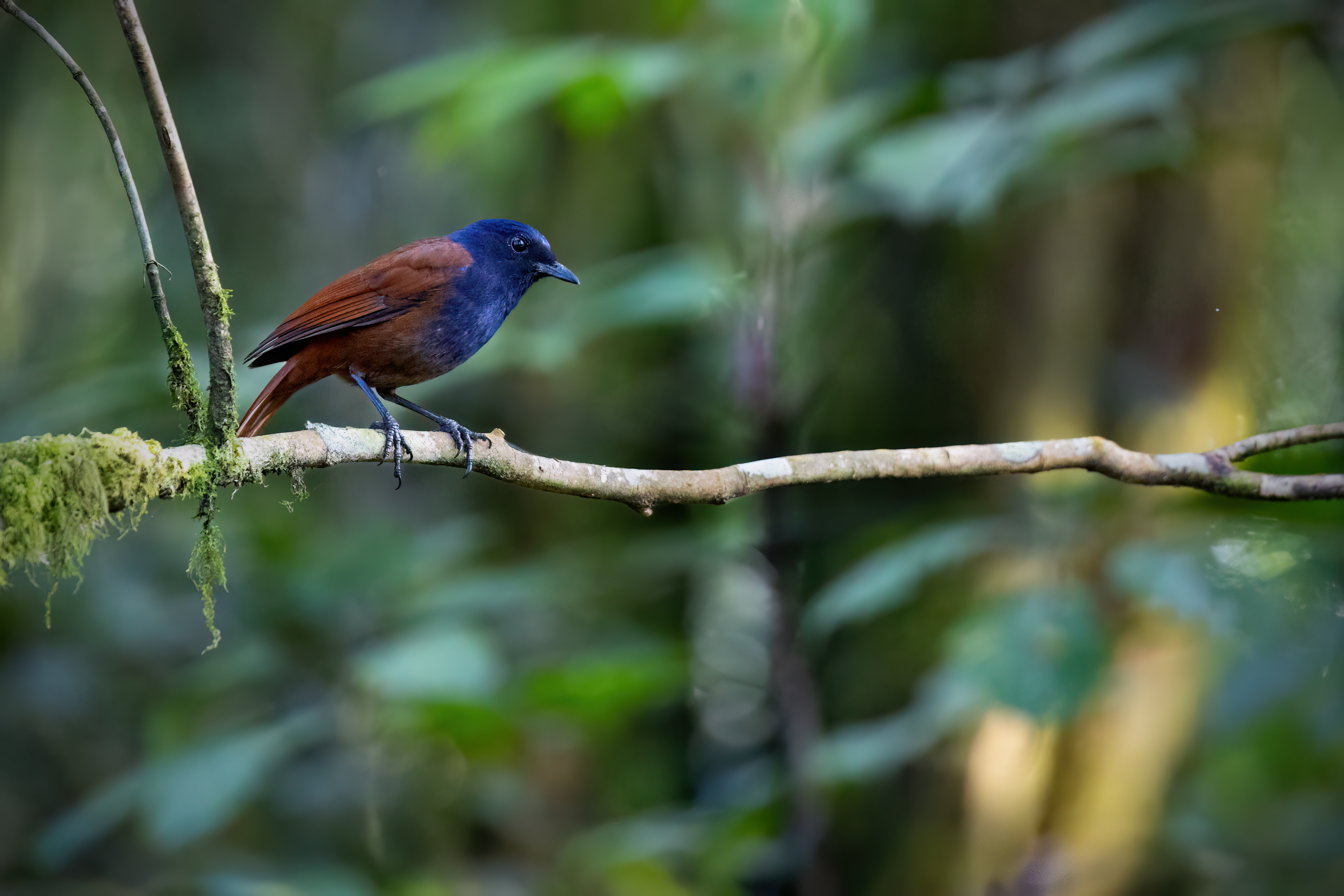

Conservation status
- Near Threatened (IUCN 3.1)

Scientific classification
- Kingdom: Animalia
- Phylum: Chordata
- Class: Aves
- Order: Passeriformes
- Family: Muscicapidae
- Genus: Myophonus
- Species: M. castaneus

Binomial name
- Myophonus castaneus Wardlaw-Ramsay, 1880

Synonyms
- Myophonus glaucinus castaneus

= Brown-winged whistling thrush =

Species of bird

The brown-winged whistling thrush (Myophonus castaneus), also known as the Sumatran whistling thrush or chestnut-winged whistling thrush, is a passerine bird belonging to the whistling thrush genus Myophonus in the family Muscicapidae. It is endemic to the island of Sumatra in Indonesia. In the past, it has often been lumped together with the Javan whistling thrush (M. glaucinus) and Bornean whistling thrush (M. borneensis) as the "Sunda whistling thrush" (M. glaucinus) but it is now often regarded as a separate species based on differences in plumage and measurements.

It is about 25 centimetres long. The black bill has an average depth of 7.3 millimetres, slenderer than the bills of the Bornean and Javan whistling thrushes. The legs and feet are dark brown. The adult male has a dark blue head, breast and shoulders with the rest of the plumage being chestnut. The adult female and immature are mostly dull chestnut-brown with a blue patch on the shoulder. The Bornean and Javan whistling thrushes lack any chestnut coloration.

It has a loud whistling call and a harsh grating call.

It occurs in montane forest from 400 to 1500 metres above sea-level. It is usually found near streams and typically keeps to the middle and subcanopy layers of the forest. It is a scarce bird and is believed to be declining as a result of deforestation.
