= H. C. Siebers =

Hendrik Cornelis Siebers (January 6, 1890 – October 8, 1949) was a Dutch ornithologist who worked mainly in the Dutch East Indies, now part of Indonesia.

== Life and work ==
Siebers was born in Surabaya and became interested in birds from a very early age and was inspired by the work of Otto Kleinschmidt. He trained to prepare specimens from the Amsterdam zoo taxidermist Paul Louis Steenhuizen (1891–1937) and went on to study to receive a doctorate in 1920 with work on birds.

He joined the Zoological Museum at Bogor in 1920 and began to collect bird specimens from Java, Sumatra and the islands chains. He described several new species including Muscicapa segregata, Ficedula harterti, and the Buru parrot (Charmosynopsis toxopei named after the collector Lambertus Johannes Toxopeus). In 1927 he worked as school teacher in Java and survived the Japanese invasion. He returned to the Netherlands in 1947.
