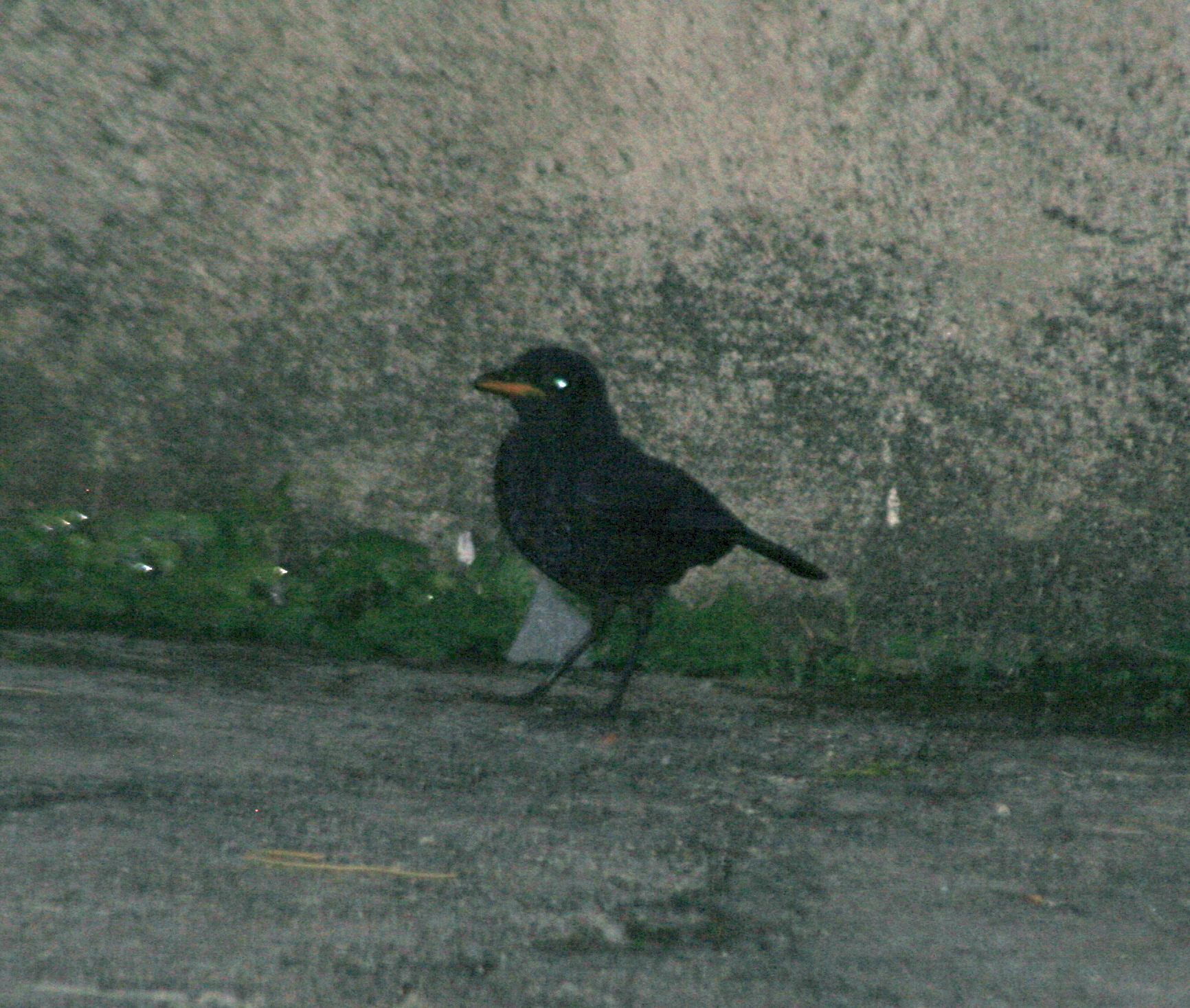

Conservation status
- Near Threatened (IUCN 3.1)

Scientific classification
- Kingdom: Animalia
- Phylum: Chordata
- Class: Aves
- Order: Passeriformes
- Family: Muscicapidae
- Genus: Myophonus
- Species: M. robinsoni

Binomial name
- Myophonus robinsoni Ogilvie-Grant, 1905

Synonyms
- Myiophonus robinsoni Ogilvie-Grant, 1905 [orth. error]

= Malaysian whistling thrush =

Species of bird

The Malaysian whistling thrush or Malayan whistling thrush (Myophonus robinsoni) is a species of bird in the family Muscicapidae. It is endemic to the Malay Peninsula. Due primarily to habitat loss, its population is thought to be in decline. (Note: "This species qualifies as Vulnerable because development proposals threaten to reduce and fragment its upland forest habitat which would result in a rapid population decline in the near future. ... ). Threats to the habitat and range of the species are outlined under Mountain Peacock-pheasant Polyplectron inopinatum." The conservation status has been changed to "Near threatened.")

== Taxonomy ==
The Malaysian whistling thrush was collected by H. C. Robinson and described as Myiophoneus robinsoni by William Robert Ogilvie-Grant in 1905. The specific name is derived from Robinson's surname.

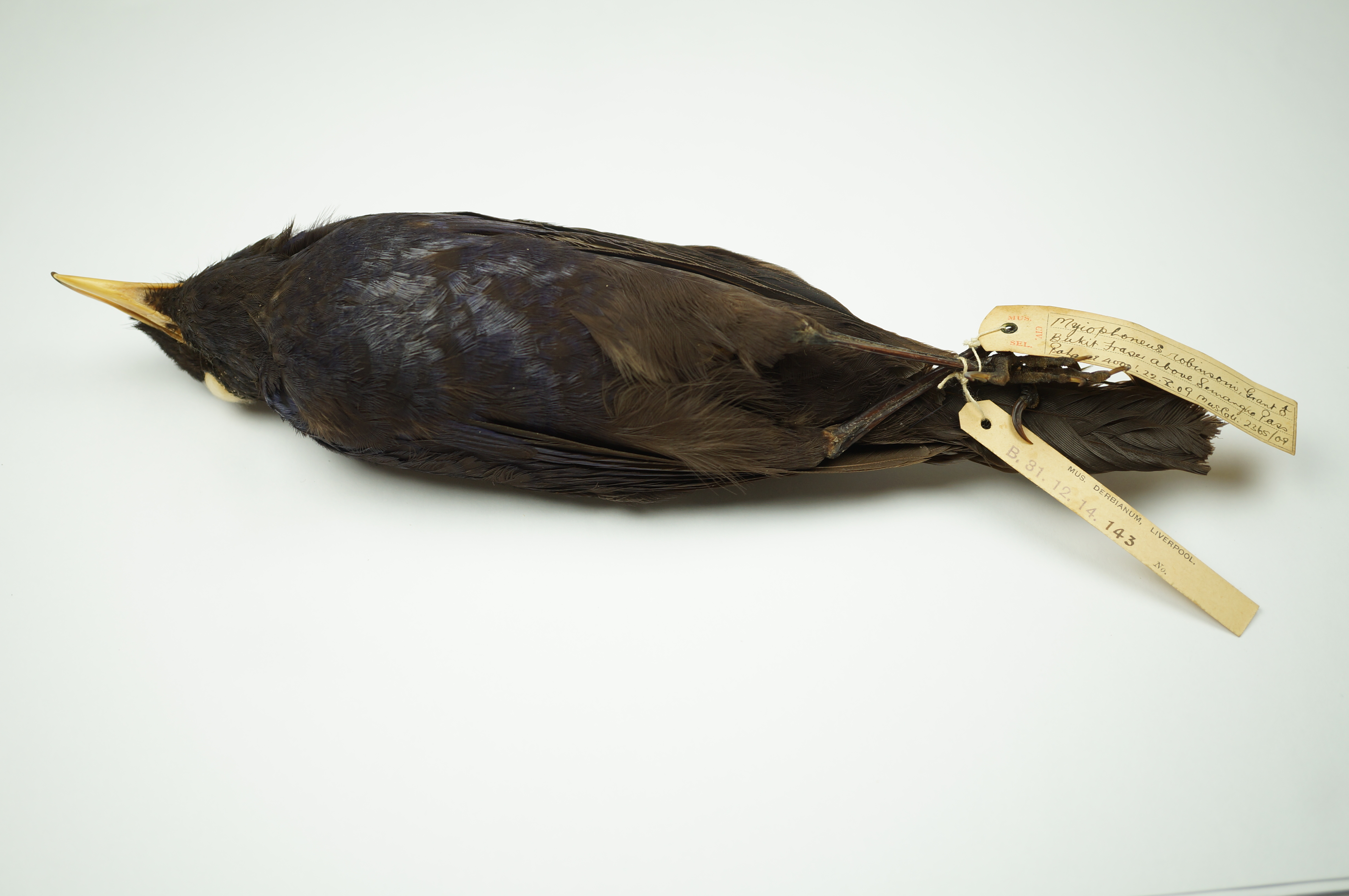
Malaysian whistling-thrush collected by H. C. Robinson, now in the collections of World Museum.'

== Distribution and habitat ==
Its natural habitat is montane forests. It is usually found near streams. It is situated at elevations of about 750–1,750 m (2,460–5,740 ft) in central peninsular Malaysia. The Malaysian whistling thrush historically ranged from the Cameron Highlands to the Genting Highlands. It was present in the Cameron Highlands, where it was trapped in the 1950s and 1960s, but a further survey in 2009–2010 failed to find it there, bringing into question the reliability of intermediate sightings; it is possible that there may have been confusion with the subspecies dicrorhynchus of the blue whistling thrush (Myophonus caeruleus). Since 1980, it has been trapped and recorded with certainty only in Fraser's Hill.

== Description ==
The species is monotypic. Its length is 25–26 cm (9.8–10.2 in). The length of the wings of the male is 14–15 cm (5.5–5.9 in). The wing length of the female is 13 cm (5.1 in). Its weight is 87–105 g (3.1–3.7 oz). The male is mostly black-blue. Parts of the head are deep purplish-blue. There is a patch of metallic blue in the lesser coverts. The male and female are very similar. The female is slightly browner and slightly smaller. The juvenile is sootier.

== Behaviour and ecology ==
Its call is a tseee. Its song contains "fluty and scratchy notes". Its diet is probably insects. Breeding has been observed in March and September. The clutch size is 1–2 eggs. The eggs are bluish-grey with pinkish-brown specks. The nest is built of dried plant material and is in a half-cup shape.

== Status ==
The species' population is estimated at 2500–9999 mature and 3500–15000 total individuals. The population is suspected to be decreasing. The species has areas of undisturbed habitat, but may be threatened by habitat destruction and degradation caused by conversion of forest to agricultural land, water pollution, invasive species and overdevelopment. Because the species may have a small range and a small population, the IUCN Red List of Threatened Species has listed it as near threatened.
