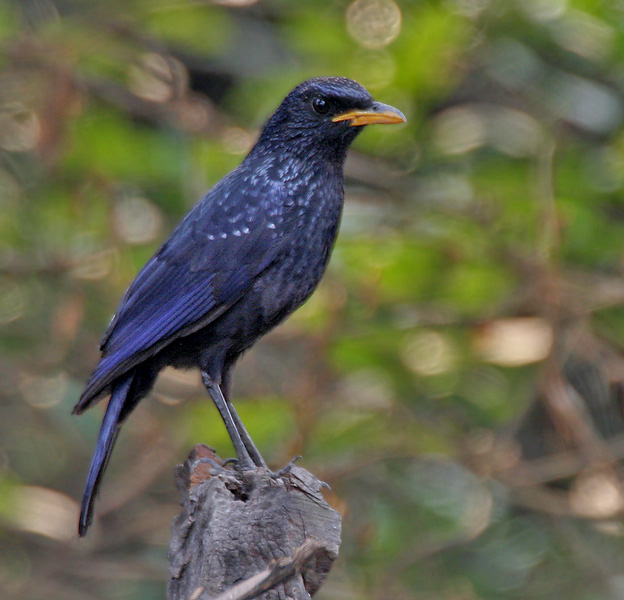
- In West Bengal

Conservation status
- Not evaluated (IUCN 3.1)

Scientific classification
- Kingdom: Animalia
- Phylum: Chordata
- Class: Aves
- Order: Passeriformes
- Family: Muscicapidae
- Genus: Myophonus
- Species: M. flavirostris

Binomial name
- Myophonus flavirostris (Horsfield, 1821)
- Range Breeding range Resident year-round Non-breeding range

= Yellow-billed whistling thrush =

Species of bird

The yellow-billed whistling thrush (Myophonus flavirostris) is a bird in the Old World flycatchers family Muscicapidae that is found in the mountains of Central Asia, South Asia, China and Southeast Asia. It was formerly considered as a subspecies of the Chinese whistling thrush (Myophonus caeruleus). It is known for its loud human-like whistling song at dawn and dusk. The widely distributed populations show variations in size and plumage, with six subspecies accepted. Like others in the genus, they feed on the ground, often along streams and in damp places, foraging for snails, crabs, insects, and fruit.

== Taxonomy ==
The yellow-billed whistling thrush was described in 1821 by the American naturalist Thomas Horsfield as Turdus flavirostris based on a specimen collected on the island of Java. The specific epithet cambines the Latin flavus meaning "yellow" or "golden-yellow" with -rostris meaning " -billed". The yellow-billed whistling thrush is now placed in the genus Myophonus that was introduced by the Dutch zoologist Coenraad Jacob Temminck in 1822. This species was formerly considered to be conspecific with the Chinese whistling thrush (Myophonus caeruleus).

Five subspecies are recognised:

- M. f. temminckii (Vigors, 1831) – central Asia to northern India, Pakistan, southeastern Tibet, and Myanmar; winters to northern Thailand
- M. f. eugenei Hume, 1873 – northeastern Assam to southern Myanmar, northern Thailand, southwestern China, and northern and central Indochina
- M. f. crassirostris Robinson, 1910 – southeastern Thailand, southern Cambodia, and northern Malay Peninsula southward to the Isthmus of Kra
- M. f. dichrorhynchus Salvadori, 1879 – southern Malay Peninsula and Sumatra
- M. f. flavirostris (Horsfield, 1821) – foothill and montane forest of Java

== Description ==
The yellow-billed whistling thrush is dark violet blue with shiny pale blue to white spangling on the tips of the body feathers other than on the lores, abdomen and under the tail. The wing coverts are a slightly different shade of blue and the median coverts have white spots at their tips. The bill is yellow and the legs are black in all. The inner webs of the flight and tail feathers are black. The sexes are similar in plumage.

It measures 29–35 cm (11–14 in) in length. It is the largest species in the old world flycatcher family Muscicapidae; weight across the subspecies can range from 136 to 231 g (4.8 to 8.1 oz). For comparison, this is around twice the weight of a common blackbird or an American robin. Among standard measurements, the wing chord measures 15.5–20 cm (6.1–7.9 in) long, the tarsus is 4.5–5.5 cm (1.8–2.2 in) and the bill is 2.9–4.6 cm (1.1–1.8 in). Size varies across the range with larger thrushes found to the north of the species range and slightly smaller ones to the south, corresponding with Bergmann's rule. In India they average 167.5 g (5.91 oz) and 158.5 g (5.59 oz).

== Distribution and habitat ==
It is found along the Tian Shan and Himalayas, in temperate forests and subtropical or tropical moist montane forests. The species ranges across Afghanistan, Bangladesh, Bhutan, Cambodia, China, Hong Kong, India, Indonesia, Kazakhstan, Laos, Macau, Malaysia, Myanmar, Nepal, Tajikistan, Thailand, Tibet, Turkmenistan, Pakistan and Vietnam. They make altitudinal movements in the Himalayas, descending in winter.

== Behaviour and ecology ==
The yellow-billed whistling thrush is usually found singly or in pairs. They hop on rocks and move about in quick spurts. They turn over leaves and small stones, cocking their head and checking for movements of prey. When alarmed they spread and droop their tail. They are active well after dusk and during the breeding season (April to August) they tend to sing during the darkness of dawn and dusk when few other birds are calling. The call precedes sunrise the most during November. The alarm call is a shrill kree. The nest is a cup of moss and roots placed in a ledge or hollow beside a stream. The usual clutch consists of 3 to 4 eggs, the pair sometimes raising a second brood. They feed on fruits, earthworms, insects, crabs and snails. Snails and crabs are typically battered on a rock before feeding. In captivity, they have been known to kill and eat mice and in the wild have been recorded preying on small birds.
