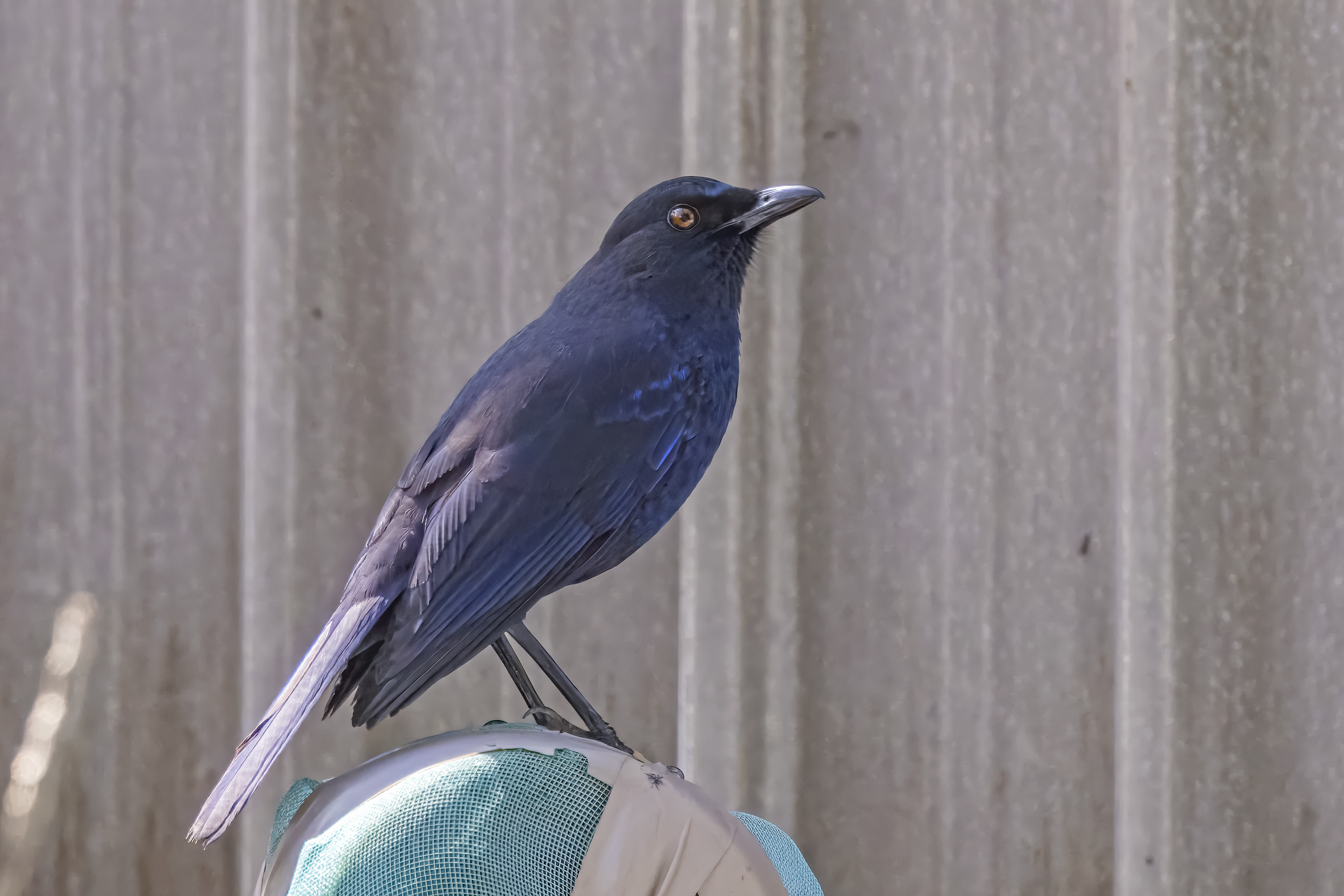
- Taiwan whistling thrush (Myophonus insularis)

Scientific classification
- Kingdom: Animalia
- Phylum: Chordata
- Class: Aves
- Order: Passeriformes
- Family: Muscicapidae
- Subfamily: Saxicolinae
- Genus: Myophonus; Temminck, 1822

Type species
- Myophonus metallicus Temminck, 1822

Species
- See text

= Whistling thrush =

Genus of birds

The whistling thrushes comprise a genus Myophonus of the Old World flycatcher family Muscicapidae.

They are all medium-sized mostly insectivorous or omnivorous birds. They are all brightly coloured species found in India and south-eastern Asia. The male is usually blue, and the females are either similar to the male or brown. The brighter blue patches found on the shoulders and sometimes the head, of whistling thrushes, uniquely for a passerine, reflect strongly in the ultraviolet.

== Taxonomy ==
The genus Myophonus was introduced in 1822 by the Dutch zoologist Coenraad Jacob Temminck to accommodate a single species, Myophonus metallicus Temminck. This is a junior synonym of Turdus flavirostris Horsfield, a subspecies of the blue whistling thrush which is therefore the type species. There has been confusion as to the correct spelling of the genus name. Temminck's work was published in 102 parts (livraisons) and Plate 170 with the associated text was included in Livraison 29 which was issued in December 1822. However, the assembled volumes included pages inserted before Plate 170 with the genus name spelled as Myiophoneus. These inserted pages cannot have been issued earlier than 1832. The genus name Myophonus is from the Ancient Greek muia meaning "fly" and phoneus meaning "slayer".

As the English name suggests, the genus was at one time placed in the thrush family Turdidae but in 2010 two separate molecular phylogenetic studies found that members of the genus were more closely related to species in the Old World flycatcher family Muscicapidae.

The genus contains ten species several of which have ranges that are restricted to islands or peninsulas:

Image	Scientific name	Common name	Distribution
	Sri Lanka whistling thrush	Myophonus blighi	found on Sri Lanka
	Shiny whistling thrush	Myophonus melanurus	Sumatra
	Javan whistling thrush	Myophonus glaucinus	Java
	Bornean whistling thrush	Myophonus borneensis	Borneo
	Brown-winged whistling thrush	Myophonus castaneus	Sumatra
	Malaysian whistling thrush	Myophonus robinsoni	peninsular Malaysia
	Malabar whistling thrush	Myophonus horsfieldii	peninsular India
	Taiwan whistling thrush or Taiwan whistling-thrush	Myophonus insularis	Taiwan
	Chinese whistling thrush	Myophonus caeruleus	breeds central and eastern China
	Yellow-billed whistling thrush	Myophonus flavirostris	breeds central Asia through Himalayas eastward to south-central China (Yunnan) and southward to Sumatra and Java

Javan, Bornean and brown-winged were formerly lumped as the Sunda whistling thrush, but were split in 2004.

== Habits ==
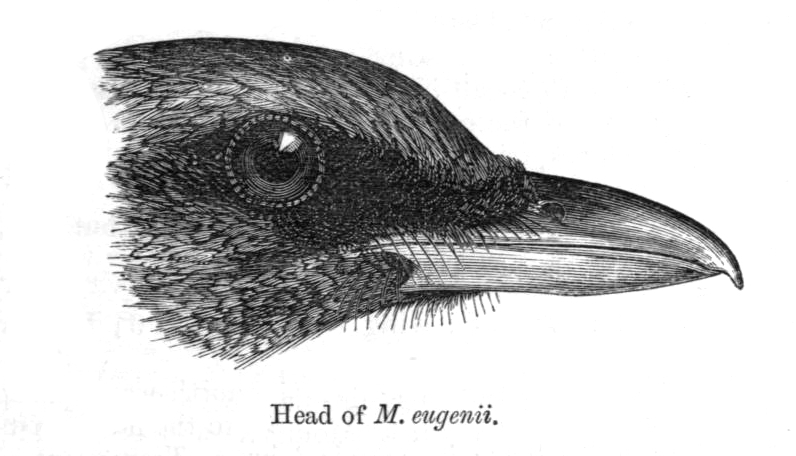
Shape of bill M. caeruleus

Whistling thrushes are mostly seen in hilly areas except during winter when they may descend to streams near the plains. They specialize in feeding on snails and their strong hooked bills are used to deal with them. They may choose a particular rock on which they crack the shells.

The nests are usually in crevices of rocks and boulders close to water. The cup nests have moss and twigs and is lined with roots and leaves. The eggs are usually three and sometimes four, elongate with a gray ground colour and marked with speckles.
