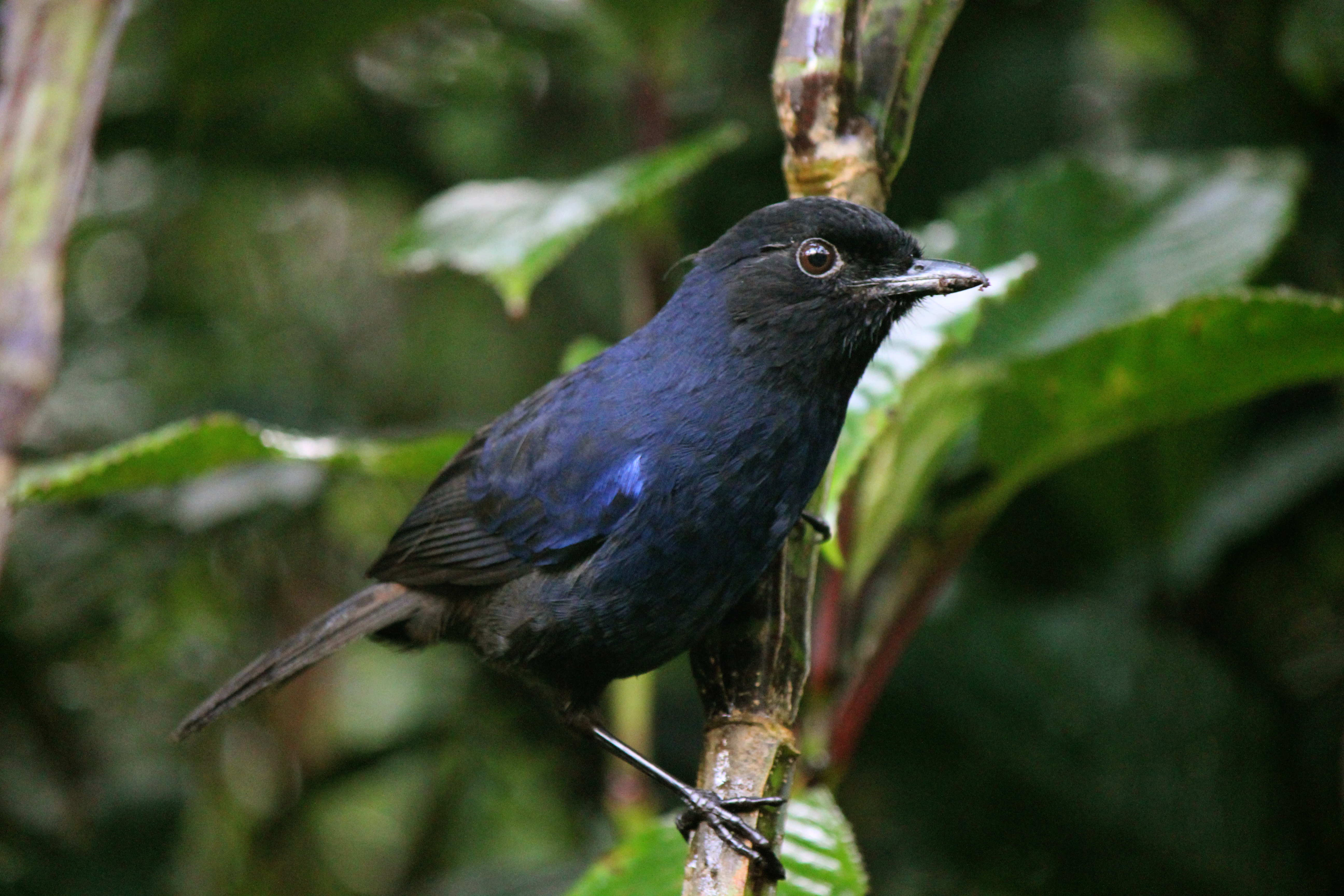

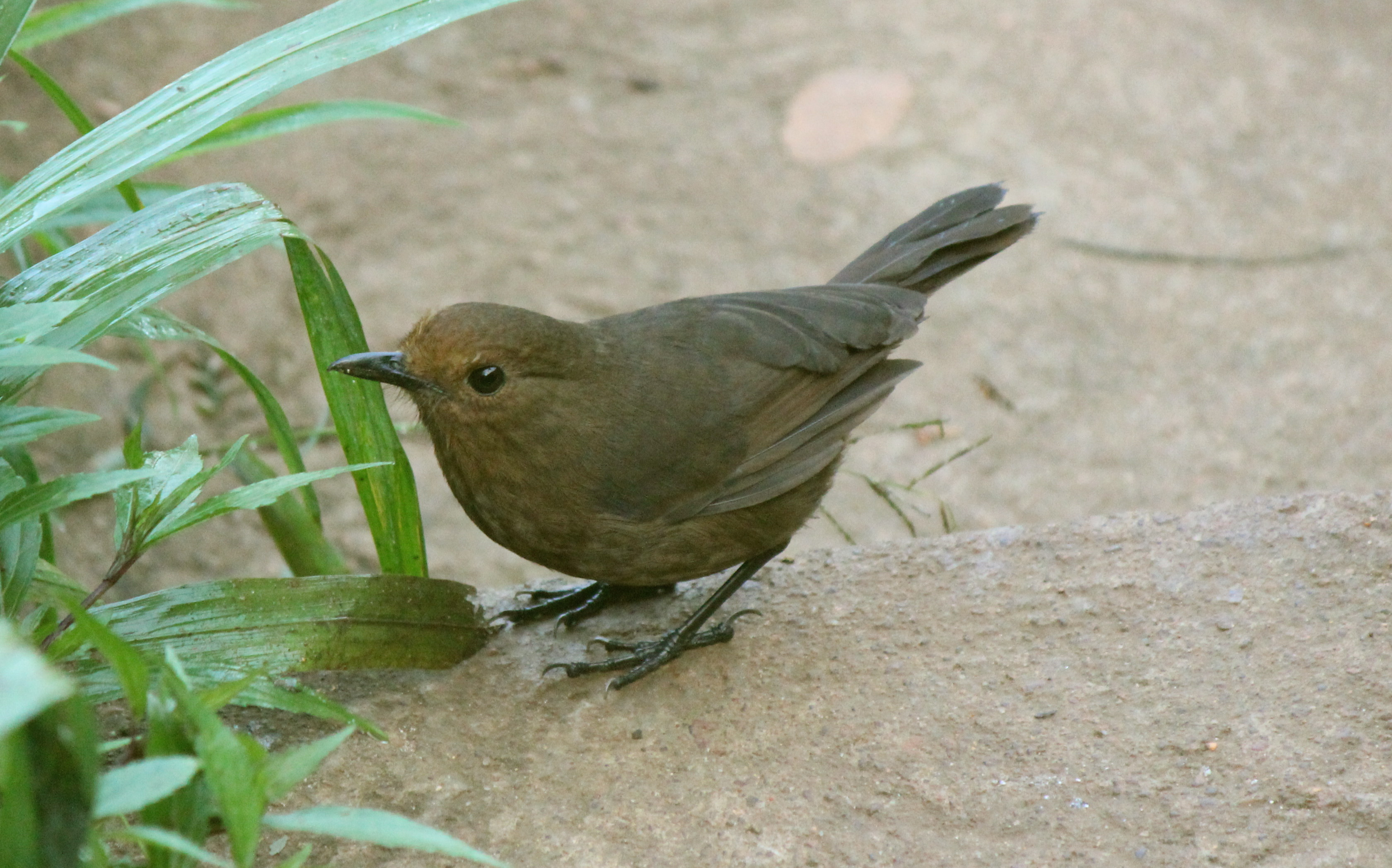
- Male and female

Conservation status
- Endangered (IUCN 3.1)

Scientific classification
- Kingdom: Animalia
- Phylum: Chordata
- Class: Aves
- Order: Passeriformes
- Family: Muscicapidae
- Genus: Myophonus
- Species: M. blighi

Binomial name
- Myophonus blighi (Holdsworth, 1872)
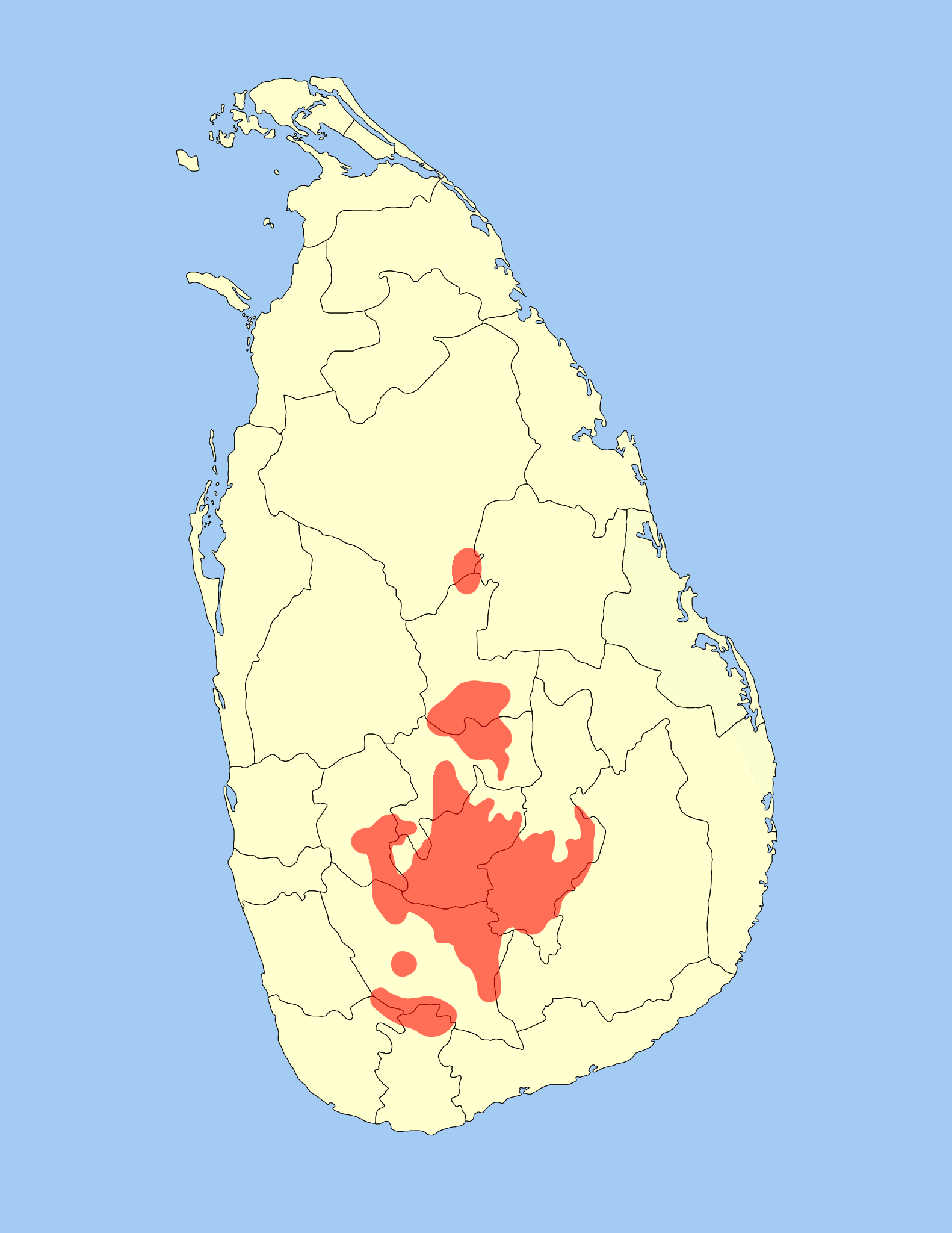
- Sri Lanka whistling thrush range

= Sri Lanka whistling thrush =

Species of bird

The Sri Lanka whistling thrush (Myophonus blighi) is a whistling thrush in the family Muscicapidae. It is a resident endemic bird in Sri Lanka.

It is found in the highlands of Sri Lanka in jungle or other dense forest near water. It is omnivorous, eating a wide range of insects, frogs, earthworms and berries. It lays one or two eggs in a neat cup-shaped nest in a bush or on a ledge near water.

It does not form flocks, although several birds may be loosely associated in suitable habitat.

This is a small whistling thrush, at only 20 cm. Adult males are dark blue with a darker head and back. There are bright blue patches on the shoulders, supercilia and forehead. The female is brown above and chestnut below, but has a bright blue shoulder patch like the male.

The male sings its simple whistling song from trees, usually in deep cover.

This is a notoriously difficult species to see, even when the males are singing in the breeding season, which starts in February. It is very shy, scarce, localised and declining due to habitat loss. Perhaps the best chance is at dawn at Horton Plains National Park 2000m up in the highlands of Sri Lanka and a site near the Haggala Botanical Gardens close to Nuwara Eliya town.

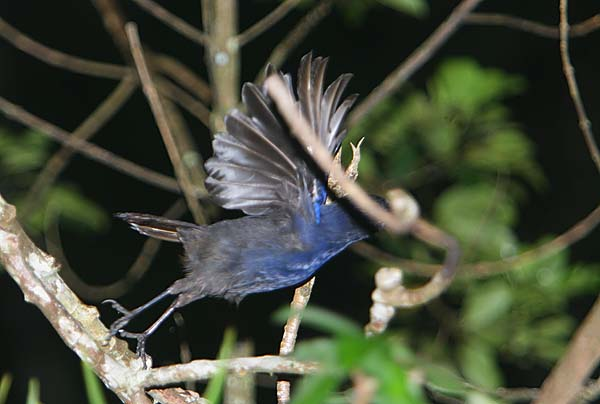
A Sri Lanka whistling-thrush photographed at night

== In culture ==
In Sri Lanka, this bird is known as Lanka Arangaya in the Sinhala language. The Whistling-thrush appears in a 75c Sri Lankan postal stamp.
