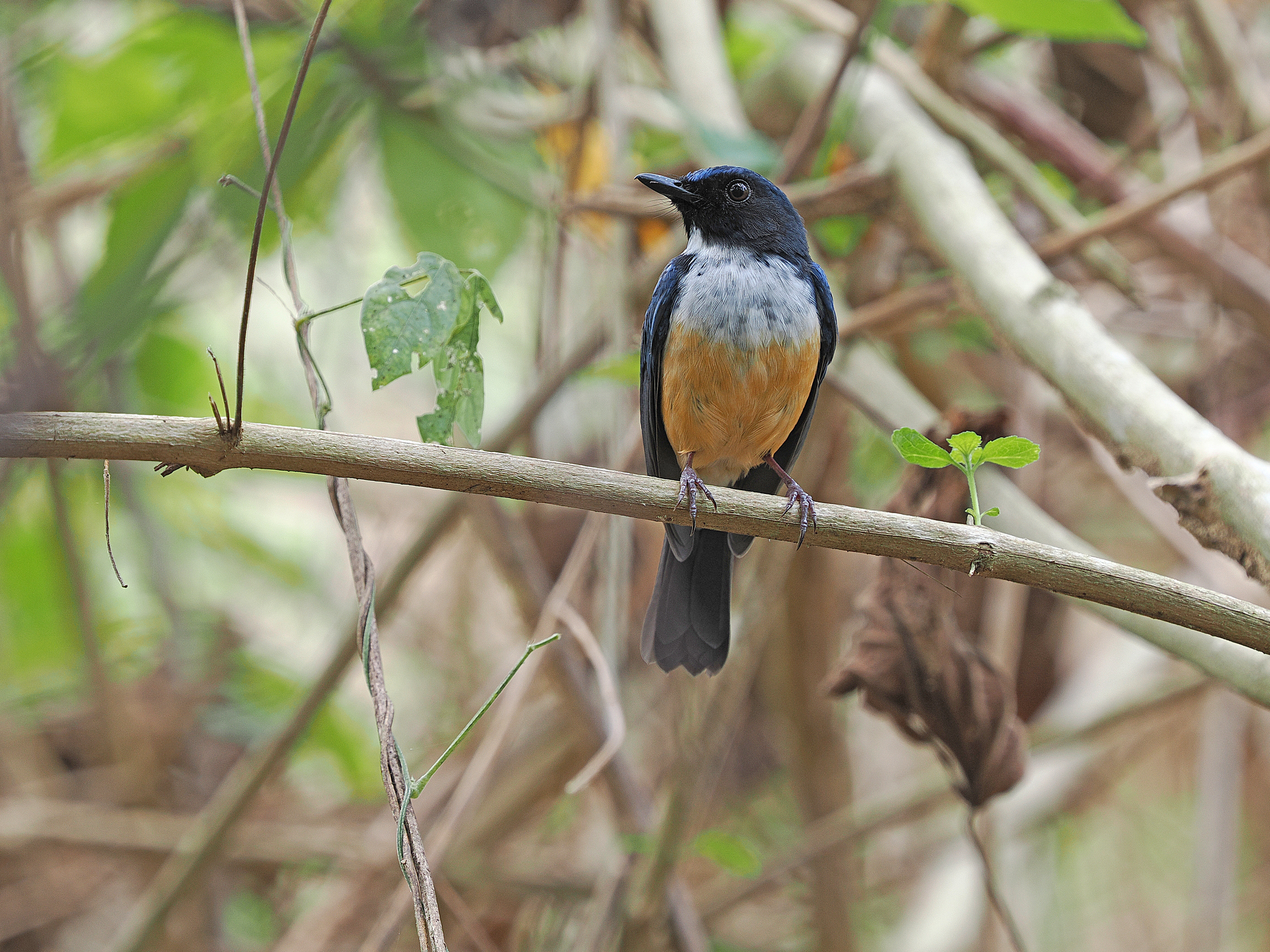

Scientific classification
- Kingdom: Animalia
- Phylum: Chordata
- Class: Aves
- Order: Passeriformes
- Family: Muscicapidae
- Genus: Cyornis
- Species: C. kalaoensis

Binomial name
- Cyornis kalaoensis (Hartert, EJO, 1896)

= Kalao blue flycatcher =

Species of bird

The Kalao blue flycatcher (Cyornis kalaoensis) is a species of bird in the family Muscicapidae that is endemic to the island of Kalao, Selayar Islands, South Sulawesi. Its natural habitat is subtropical or tropical mangrove forests.

This flycatcher was formerly considered as a subspecies of the mangrove blue flycatcher (Cyornis rufigastra) but is now treated as a separate species based on its distinctive vocalization and plumage.
