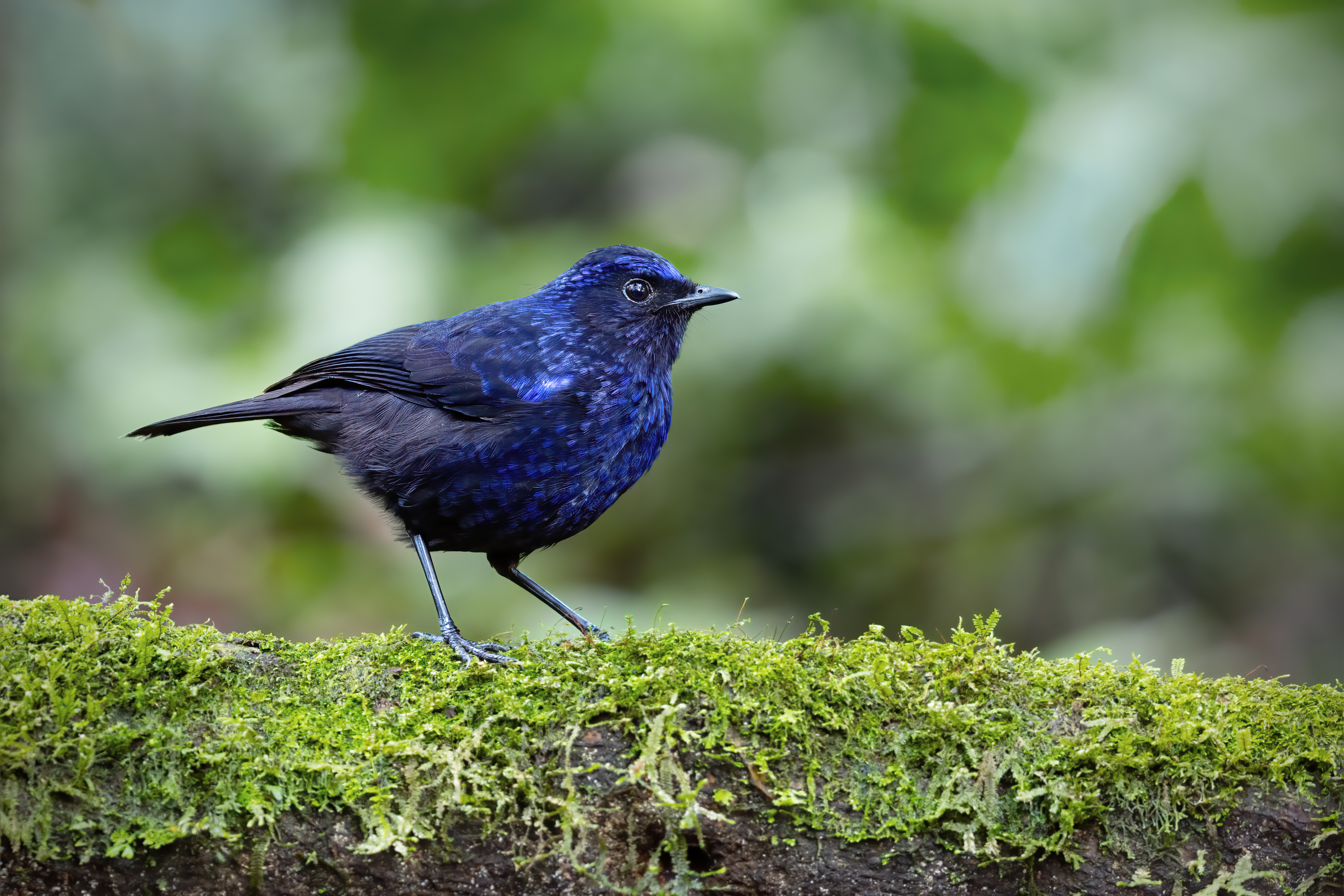

Conservation status
- Least Concern (IUCN 3.1)

Scientific classification
- Kingdom: Animalia
- Phylum: Chordata
- Class: Aves
- Order: Passeriformes
- Family: Muscicapidae
- Genus: Myophonus
- Species: M. melanurus

Binomial name
- Myophonus melanurus (Salvadori, 1879)

= Shiny whistling thrush =

Species of bird

The shiny whistling thrush (Myophonus melanurus) is a species of bird in the family Muscicapidae. It is native to the Barisan Mountains in Sumatra.

Its natural habitat is subtropical or tropical moist montane forests.
