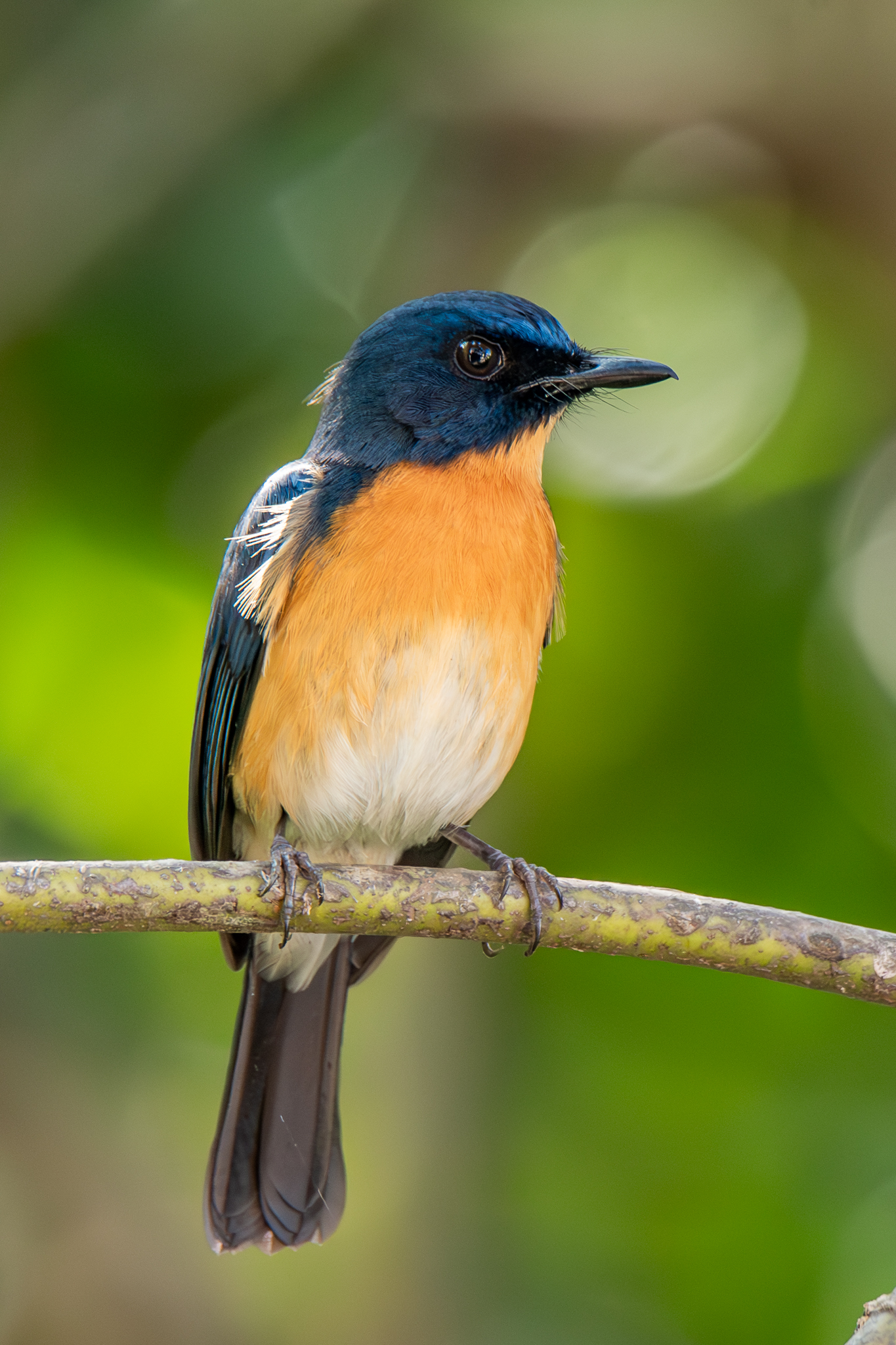
- Male
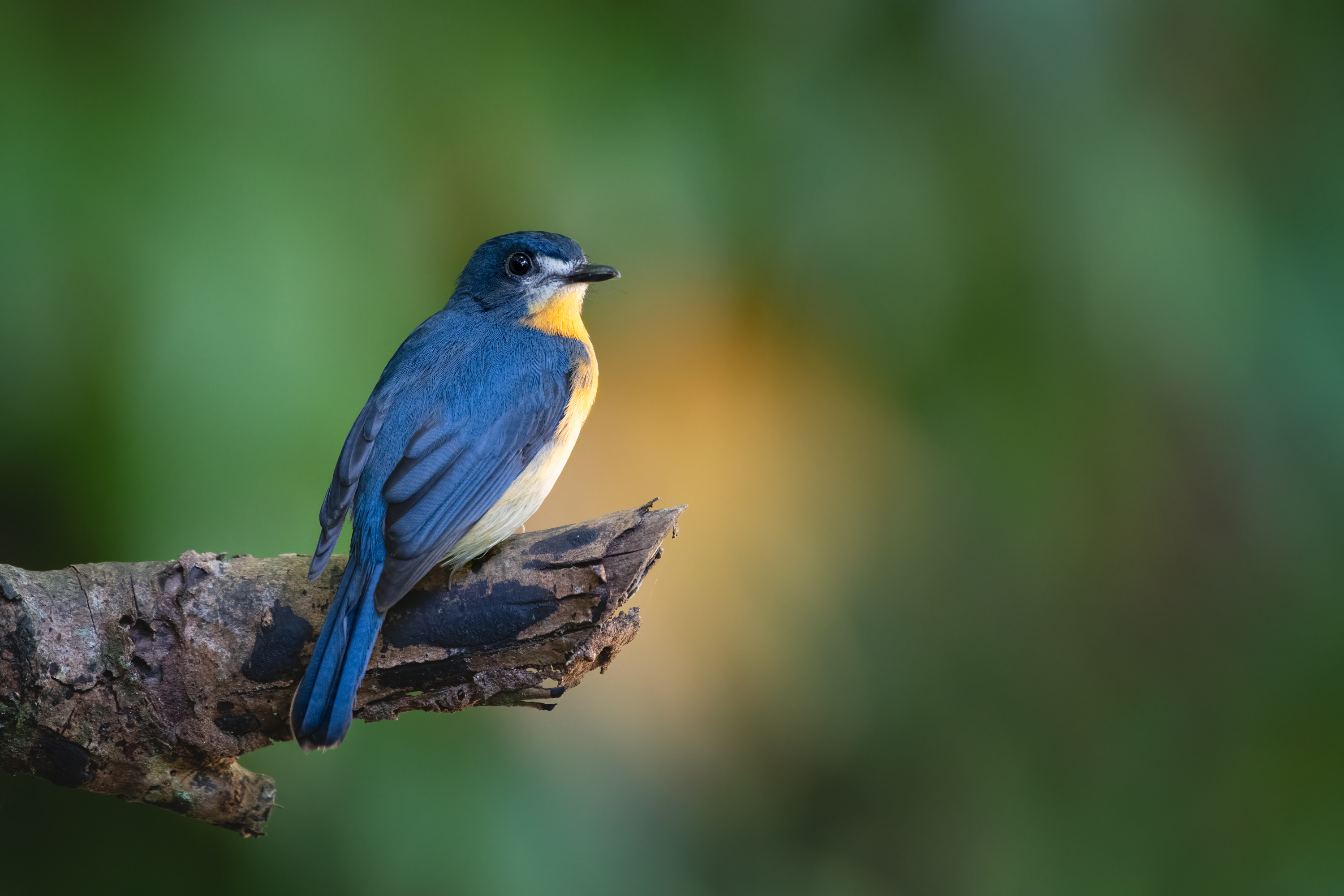
- Female

Conservation status
- Least Concern (IUCN 3.1)

Scientific classification
- Kingdom: Animalia
- Phylum: Chordata
- Class: Aves
- Order: Passeriformes
- Family: Muscicapidae
- Genus: Cyornis
- Species: C. rufigastra

Binomial name
- Cyornis rufigastra (Raffles, 1822)

= Mangrove blue flycatcher =

Species of bird

The mangrove blue flycatcher (Cyornis rufigastra) is a species of bird in the family Muscicapidae. It is native to Brunei, Indonesia, Malaysia, the Philippines, Sri Lanka, Singapore, and Thailand. Its natural habitat is subtropical or tropical mangrove forests. Clements splits the Kalao blue flycatcher, Cyornis kalaoensis into a distinct species. The IOC still lists it as a subspecies of the mangrove blue flycatcher.
