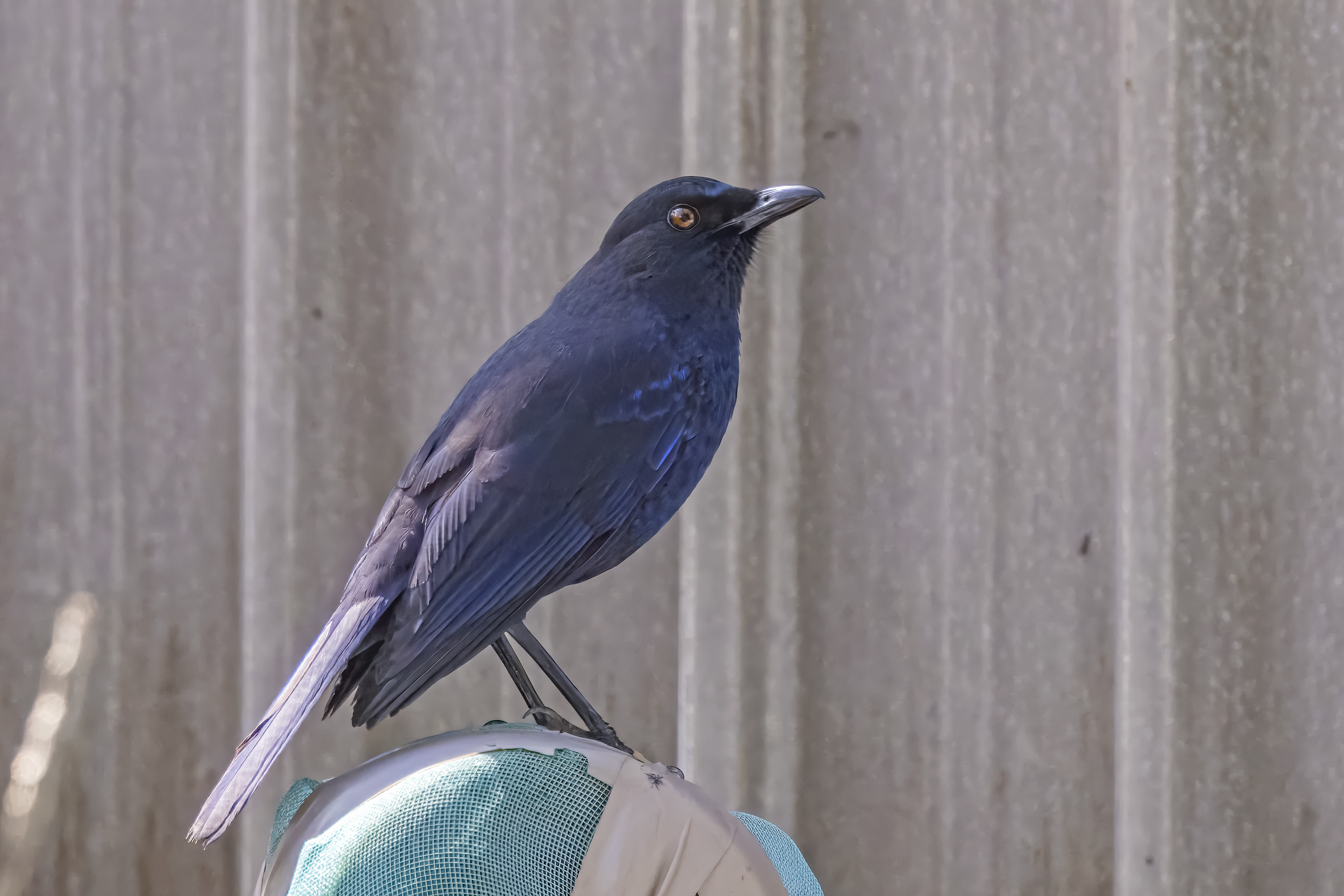

Conservation status
- Least Concern (IUCN 3.1)

Scientific classification
- Kingdom: Animalia
- Phylum: Chordata
- Class: Aves
- Order: Passeriformes
- Family: Muscicapidae
- Genus: Myophonus
- Species: M. insularis

Binomial name
- Myophonus insularis Gould, 1863

Synonyms
- Myiophonus insularis Myophonus horsfieldii insularis

= Taiwan whistling thrush =

Species of bird

The Taiwan whistling thrush (Myophonus insularis), also known as the Formosan whistling thrush, is a species of bird in the family Muscicapidae. It is endemic to Taiwan.

== Taxonomy ==
The Taiwan whistling thrush was collected by Robert Swinhoe and described as Myiophoneus insularis by John Gould in 1862. Swinhoe called it the "Formosan cavern-bird" because it inhabits the dark, forested ravines in the mountains. It was formerly considered a subspecies of the Malabar whistling thrush (Myophonus horsfieldii). The species is monotypic.

== Distribution and habitat ==
This thrush is endemic to Taiwan. Its natural habitat is subtropical or tropical moist montane forests. It is found at elevations of up to 2,700 m (8,900 ft).

== Description ==
Its length is 28 to 30 cm (11 to 12 in). The wings are 15 to 16 cm (5.9 to 6.3 in) long. It is mostly blackish-blue. Some feathers are navy blue or metallic blue. Some underwing coverts have white bases. The underparts are blackish. Its neck, breast and flanks are scaled. Its eyes are deep red, and its lores, bill and legs are black. The two sexes are alike. The juvenile is dull blackish, with a bluish tinge. The gape of the juvenile is yellowish.

== Behaviour and ecology ==
Activity is greatest at dawn and dusk. It jumps among rocks in forest streams. It often opens and closes its tail when it is sitting on a rock. Its call is a sharp whistle, described as screee. Its song is loud and melodious whistles.

=== Breeding ===
The Taiwan whistling thrush is monogamous. The breeding season is from late March to early September. There are two broods each breeding season. Nests are usually built in holes in rocks or trees. Nests are also built in human structures. They are made of twigs, roots, stems and moss. There are 2 to 4 eggs in a clutch. The eggs are pinkish with brownish or greyish marks. The female incubates the eggs. Incubation takes about 12 to 14 days. Newly hatched chicks are altricial. They have few feathers. Both parents feed the nestlings. Chicks leave the nest after about 21 days.

=== Diet ===
The diet consists of shrimp, earthworms, insects, frogs, reptiles, and fish, obtained by foraging in or near streams.

== Status ==
The International Union for Conservation of Nature has assessed M. insularis to be of least concern. Its population is estimated at 10,000 to 100,000 breeding pairs and is suspected to be decreasing due to habitat destruction. It was listed as other conservation-deserving wildlife in the schedule of protected species of the Taiwan Wildlife Conservation Act, but was removed from the list in 2008.

== See also ==
- List of protected species in Taiwan
- List of endemic species of Taiwan
- List of endemic birds of Taiwan
