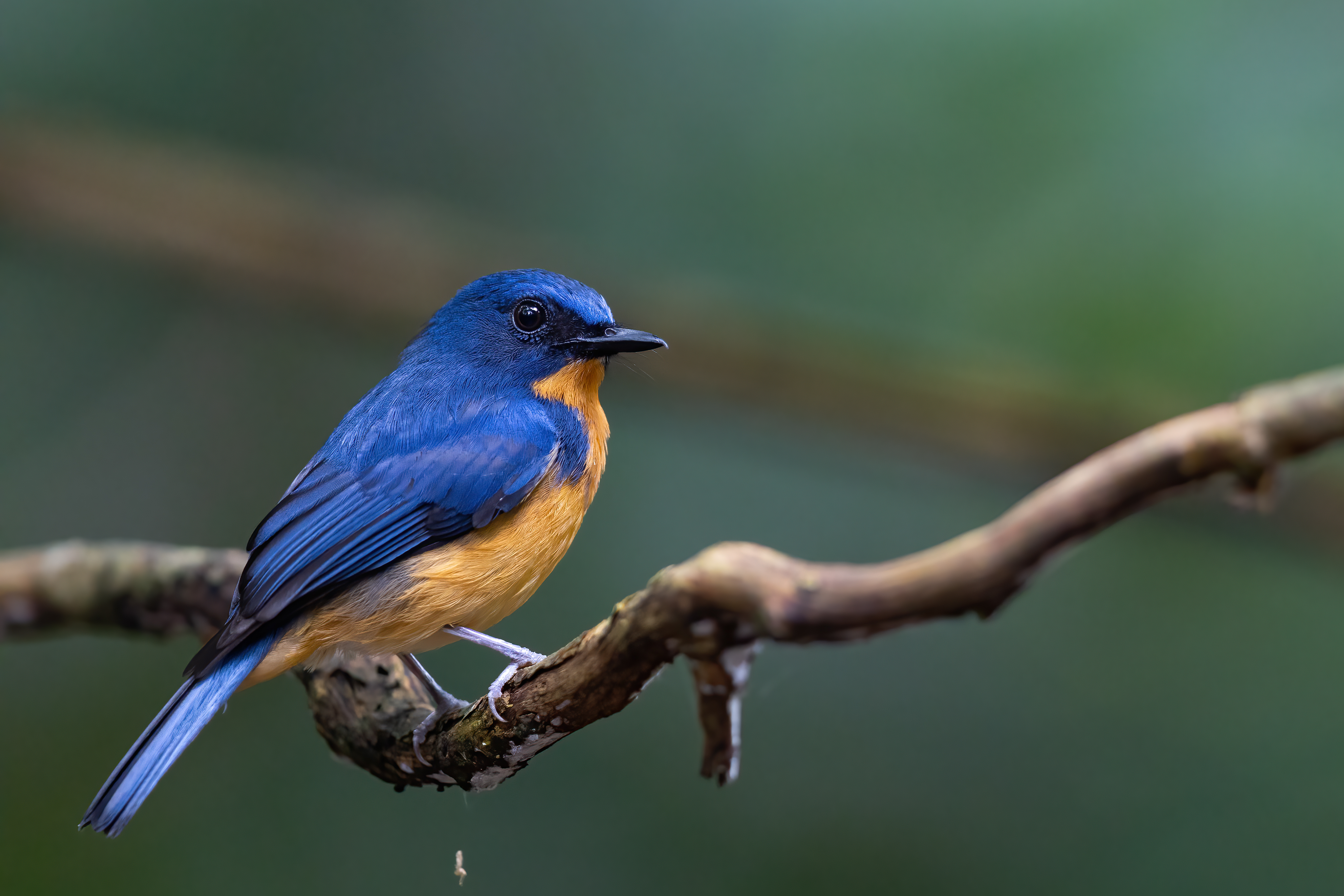
- male
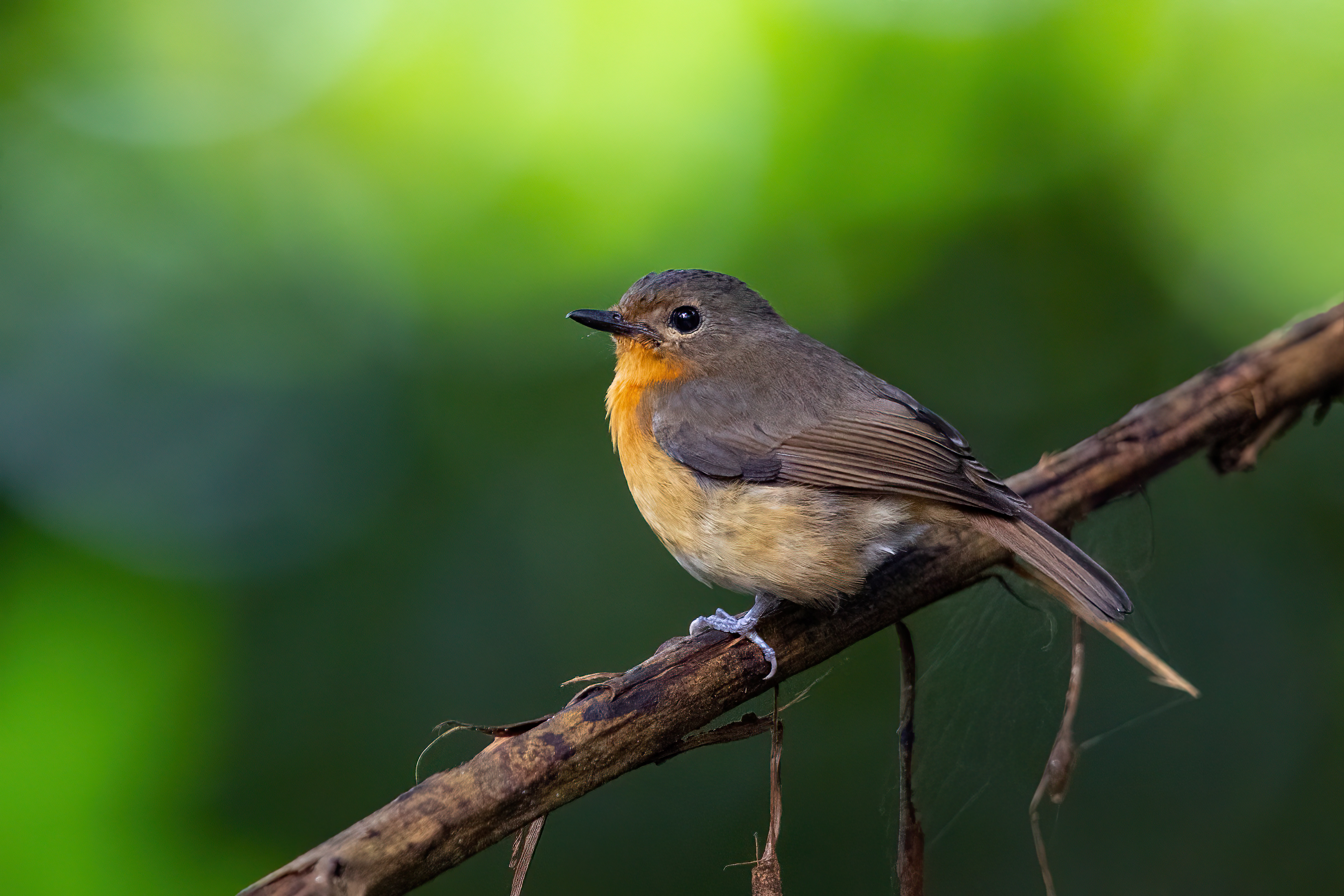
- female

Conservation status
- Least Concern (IUCN 3.1)

Scientific classification
- Kingdom: Animalia
- Phylum: Chordata
- Class: Aves
- Order: Passeriformes
- Family: Muscicapidae
- Genus: Cyornis
- Species: C. montanus

Binomial name
- Cyornis montanus Robinson & Kinnear, 1928

= Dayak blue flycatcher =

Species of bird

The Dayak blue flycatcher (Cyornis montanus) is a species of bird in the family Muscicapidae. It is endemic to the island of Borneo. The Dayak blue flycatcher, formerly considered conspecific with the Javan blue flycatcher (Cyornis banyumas), was split as a distinct species by the IOC in 2021.
