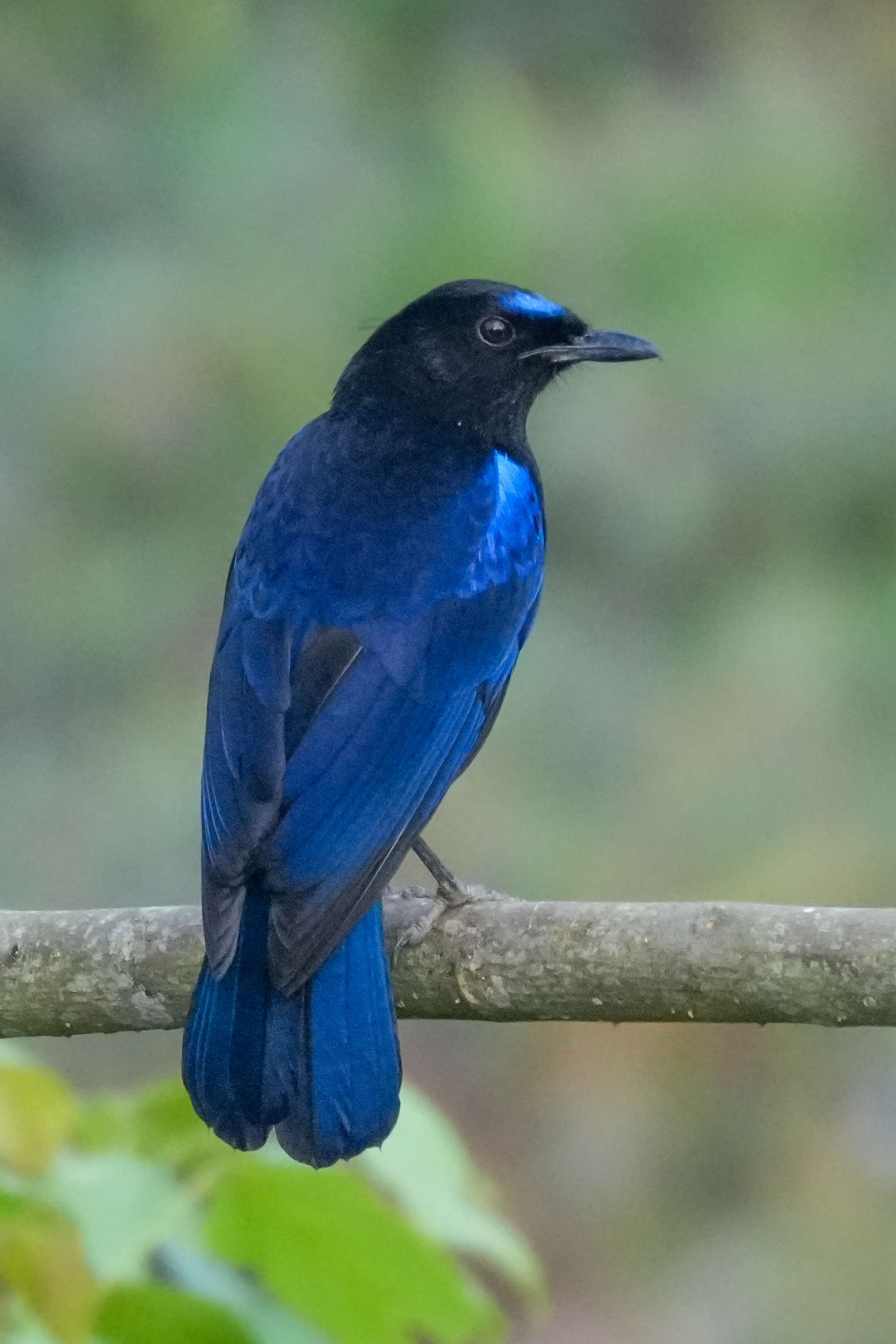
- In Valparai, Tamil Nadu

Conservation status
- Least Concern (IUCN 3.1)

Scientific classification
- Kingdom: Animalia
- Phylum: Chordata
- Class: Aves
- Order: Passeriformes
- Family: Muscicapidae
- Genus: Myophonus
- Species: M. horsfieldii

Binomial name
- Myophonus horsfieldii Vigors, 1831
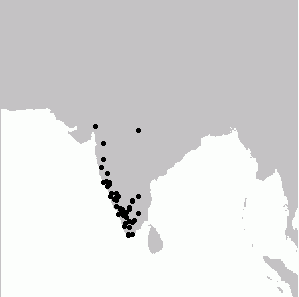

Synonyms
- Myiophoneus horsfieldii

Audio
- Partial song

= Malabar whistling thrush =

Species of bird

The Malabar whistling thrush (Myophonus horsfieldii) is a whistling thrush in the family Muscicapidae. The bird has been called whistling schoolboy for the whistling calls that they make at dawn that have a very human quality. The species is a resident in the Western Ghats and associated hills of peninsular India including central India and parts of the Eastern Ghats.

== Taxonomy and systematics ==
This is a monotypic taxon previously considered conspecific with Taiwan whistling thrush.

== Description and biology ==
It is a large thrush measuring about 25-30 cm and weighs about 101-130 g. The male has a blackish upper body with shiny metallic patches of blue on the forehead and shoulders, and glossy royal-blue scaling on back, scapulars and mid-breast to belly. The bill and legs are black. The female is very similar, but with weaker scaling below. Juveniles are black, with glossy blue shoulder patch and wing edgings. The blue becomes visible only in oblique lighting and is due to ultraviolet reflectance, a shared attribute with other whistling thrushes.

== Distribution and habitat ==
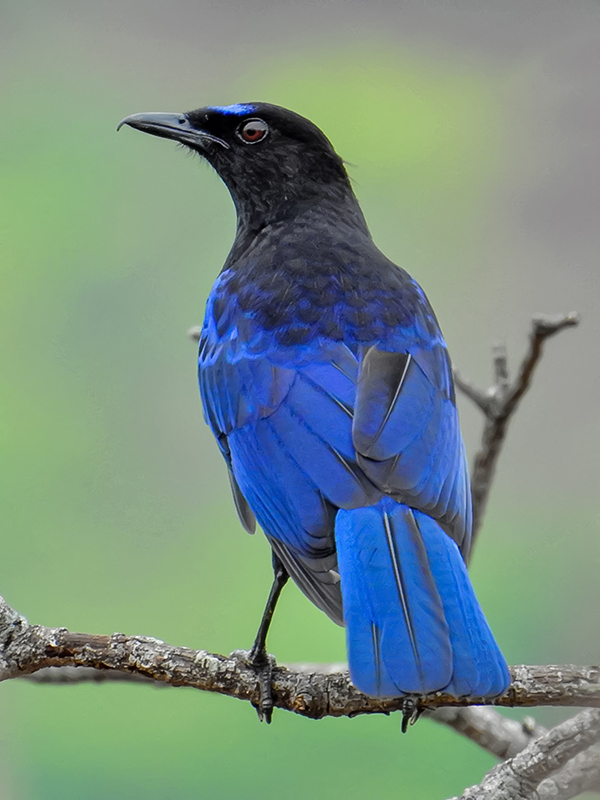
In Mangaon, Raigad, Maharashtra

Malabar whistling thrushes are usually found in dark undergrowth in dense riverine forest. They typically forage in the margins, beds and adjacent ground of rocky hill streams and rivers in forest, secondary growth and plantations from foothills up to 2200 m above sea level but reach the plains in the rainy season. The species is found all along the Western Ghats south of the Surat Dangs. They are also found along the Satpura range to Chhattisgarh, northwestern Orissa (Surguja and Simlipal National Park), and locally in the Eastern Ghats. Populations are not migratory but are known to disperse widely in winter. An individual that was ringed in Mahabaleshwar in the summer of 1972 was recovered in the winter of 1976 in Sampaje, Coorg. Although historically recorded twice from Mount Abu, more recent surveys have not recorded the bird or suitable habitat in that location.

== Behaviour and ecology ==
They are usually seen singly or in pairs. Wherever there is suitable habitat, they are often found close to human habitation. The male sings its varied and melodious whistling song from trees during summer. They may sing for a long time around dawn but at other times of the day they often utter sharp single or two note high-pitched whistles. They were once popular as cage birds, with the ability to learn entire tunes. They bathe frequently in water usually in the mornings and evenings but also at midday during hot weather.

=== Food and feeding ===
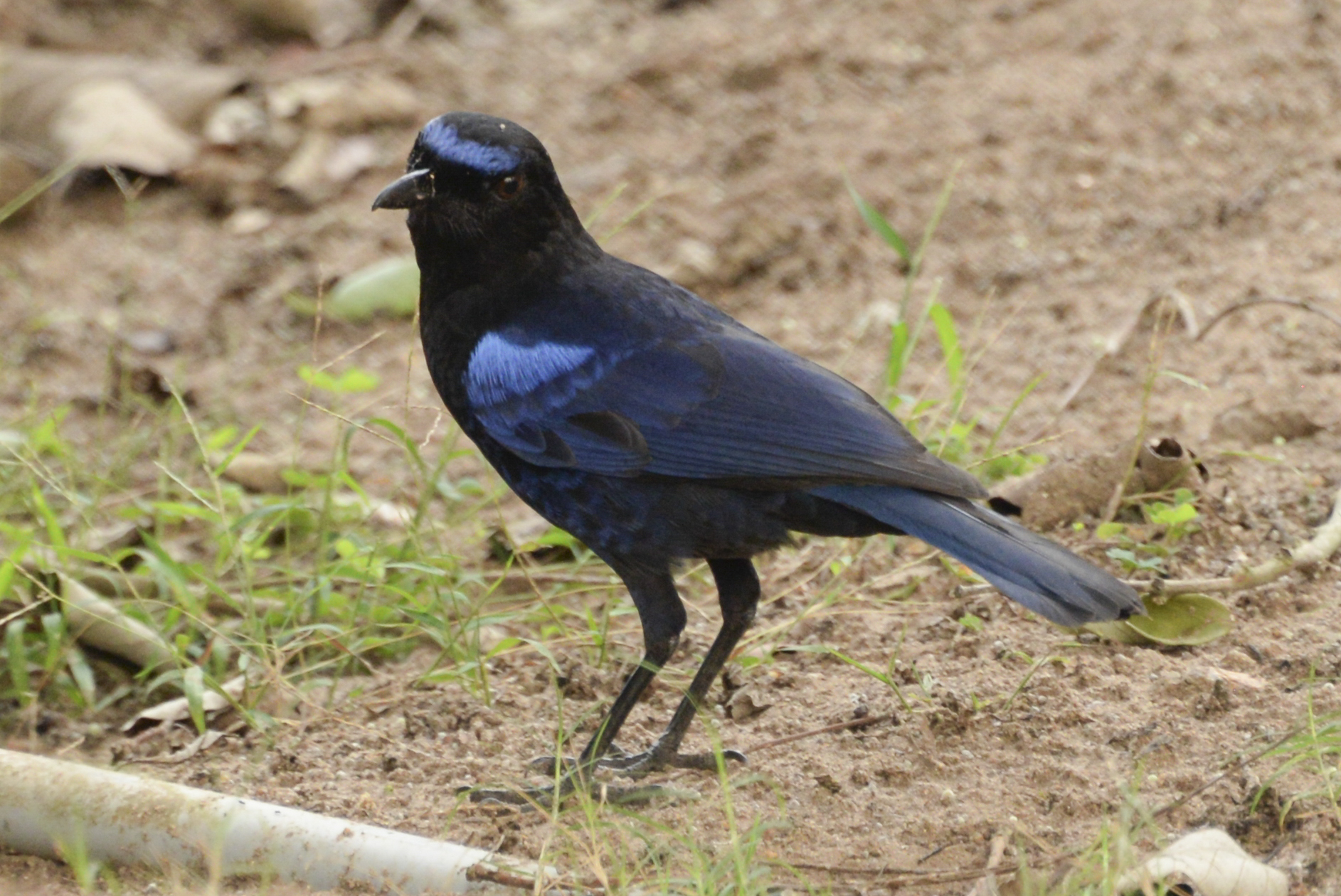
Foraging on the ground

The species is omnivorous, feeding primarily on insects, snails, worms, crabs and small frogs, as well as drupes, and wind-fallen figs and berries. Occasionally they have been recorded eating small snakes and rare records of eating longer snakes such as the Rat snake have been reported.

=== Breeding ===
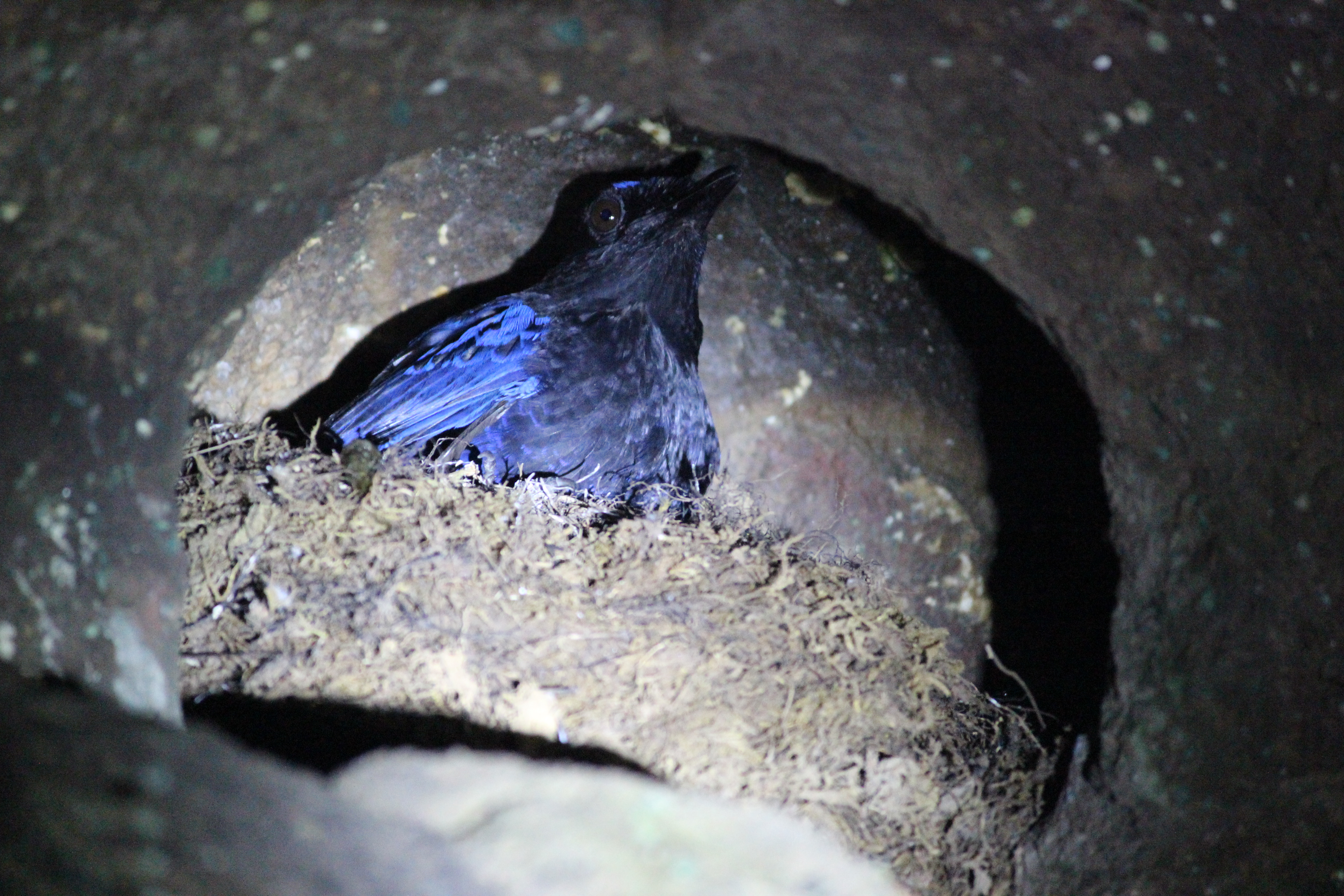
At nest

The birds breed from March to December and begin with the arrival of the monsoons. Courtship involves chasing flights and calling. They usually nest in a cavity on a stream bank but will sometimes make use of nearby buildings. In a study of nest-site selection in the Silent Valley area, a total of 21 nests were found mostly on rocks along the edge of streams and one each in a tree hole and inside an abandoned building. The nest is a cup made of moss, bamboo roots and grass, with a broad base and tapering towards the top. The base of the nest appeared to be cemented to the rock with mud. Mean nest height was 14.8 cm and depth 7.4 cm. The mean outer width and inner width were 21.5 cm and 13.1 cm respectively. Mean height from the ground was 125.8 cm. Most nest sites were about 6 m from water with 60% rock cover. The nests were mostly fully concealed and nesting success was directly related to it. The birds show high site fidelity; occupying and nesting near their previous season's nests. The clutch consists of 2 to 4 eggs. The eggs are pale salmon pink with speckling. The eggs are incubated for about 16 or 17 days by both the male and female.

== Other sources ==
- Harish, B T (1977) The Malabar Whistling Thrush. Newsletter for Birdwatchers ., India. 17(11):8.
- Thakker, P S (1980) Malabar Whistling Thrush and Chestnutheaded Bee-eater. Newsletter for Birdwatchers ., India. 20(11), 3–4.
- Navarro, A (1976) The Whistling Thrush – the harbinger of the monsoon. Newsletter for Birdwatchers . 16(11):5–7
