= Sumba flycatcher =

Conservation status
- Least Concern (IUCN 3.1)

Scientific classification
- Kingdom: Animalia
- Phylum: Chordata
- Class: Aves
- Order: Passeriformes
- Family: Muscicapidae
- Genus: Ficedula
- Species: F. harterti

Binomial name
- Ficedula harterti (Siebers, 1928)

Species of bird

The Sumba flycatcher (Ficedula harterti) is a species of bird in the family Muscicapidae. It is endemic to Indonesia.

Its natural habitat is subtropical or tropical moist lowland forests.
