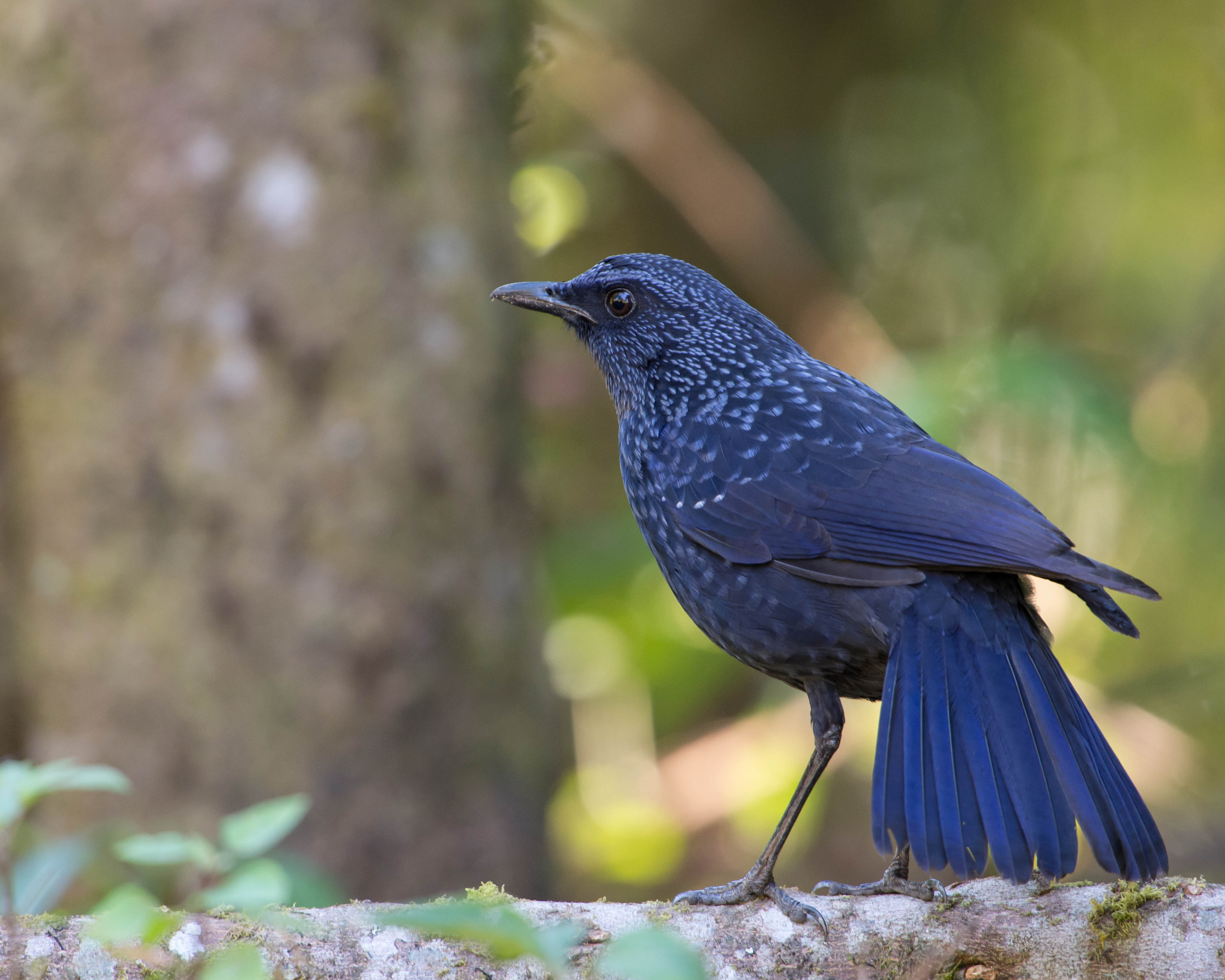
- In Taiwan

Conservation status
- Least Concern (IUCN 3.1)

Scientific classification
- Kingdom: Animalia
- Phylum: Chordata
- Class: Aves
- Order: Passeriformes
- Family: Muscicapidae
- Genus: Myophonus
- Species: M. caeruleus

Binomial name
- Myophonus caeruleus (Scopoli, 1786)
- Range Breeding range Resident year-round Non-breeding range

= Chinese whistling thrush =

Species of bird

The Chinese whistling thrush (Myophonus caeruleus) is a bird in the Old World flycatchers family Muscicapidae that breeds in central and eastern China. It was formerly treated as being conspecific with the yellow-billed whistling thrush (Myophonus flavirostris) and together they were known as the blue whistling thrush. It is known for its loud human-like whistling song at dawn and dusk. Like others in the genus, they feed on the ground, often along streams and in damp places, foraging for snails, crabs, insects, and fruit.

== Taxonomy ==
The Chinese whistling thrush was formally described in 1786 by the Austrian naturalist Giovanni Antonio Scopoli under the binomial name Gracula caerulea. The specific epithet is from Latin caeruleus meaning "blue". Scopoli based his account on "Le Merle blue de la Chine" that had been described and illustrated in 1782 by the French naturalist Pierre Sonnerat in his book Voyage aux Indes orientales et a la Chine. The type locality has been restricted to Canton. The blue whistling thrush is now one of ten species placed in the genus Myophonus that was introduced in 1822 by the Dutch zoologist Coenraad Jacob Temminck. The species is monotypic: no subspecies are recognised.

== Description ==
The Chinese whistling thrush is dark violet blue with shiny pale blue to white spangling on the tips of the body feathers other than on the lores, abdomen and under the tail. The wing coverts are a slightly different shade of blue and the median coverts have white spots at their tips. The bill and legs are black. The inner webs of the flight and tail feathers is black. The sexes are similar in plumage. It measures 29–35 cm (11–14 in) in length. It is the largest species in the old world flycatcher family Muscicapidae; weight across the subspecies can range from 136 to 231 g (4.8 to 8.1 oz). For comparison, this is around twice the weight of a common blackbird or an American robin. Among standard measurements, the wing chord measures 15.5–20 cm (6.1–7.9 in) long, the tarsus is 4.5–5.5 cm (1.8–2.2 in) and the bill is 2.9–4.6 cm (1.1–1.8 in). Size varies across the range with larger thrushes found to the north of the species range and slightly smaller ones to the south, corresponding with Bergmann's rule. In northern China, males and females average 188 g (6.6 oz) and 171 g (6.0 oz).

== Behaviour and ecology ==
The Chinese whistling thrush is usually found singly or in pairs. They hop on rocks and move about in quick spurts. They turn over leaves and small stones, cocking their head and checking for movements of prey. When alarmed they spread and droop their tail. They are active well after dusk and during the breeding season (April to August) they tend to sing during the darkness of dawn and dusk when few other birds are calling. The call precedes sunrise the most during November. The alarm call is a shrill kree. The nest is a cup of moss and roots placed in a ledge or hollow beside a stream. The usual clutch consists of 3 to 4 eggs, the pair sometimes raising a second brood. They feed on fruits, earthworms, insects, crabs and snails. Snails and crabs are typically battered on a rock before feeding. In captivity, they have been known to kill and eat mice and in the wild have been recorded preying on small birds.
