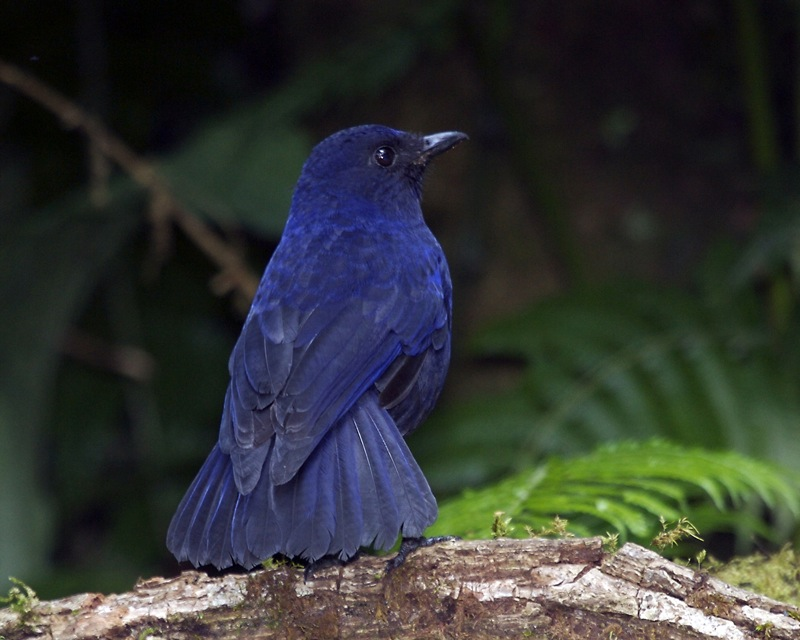

Conservation status
- Least Concern (IUCN 3.1)

Scientific classification
- Kingdom: Animalia
- Phylum: Chordata
- Class: Aves
- Order: Passeriformes
- Family: Muscicapidae
- Genus: Myophonus
- Species: M. glaucinus

Binomial name
- Myophonus glaucinus (Temminck, 1823)

= Javan whistling thrush =

Species of bird

The Javan whistling thrush (Myophonus glaucinus) is a species of bird in the family Muscicapidae. It is found in Java and Bali.

Its natural habitat is subtropical or tropical moist montane forests.
