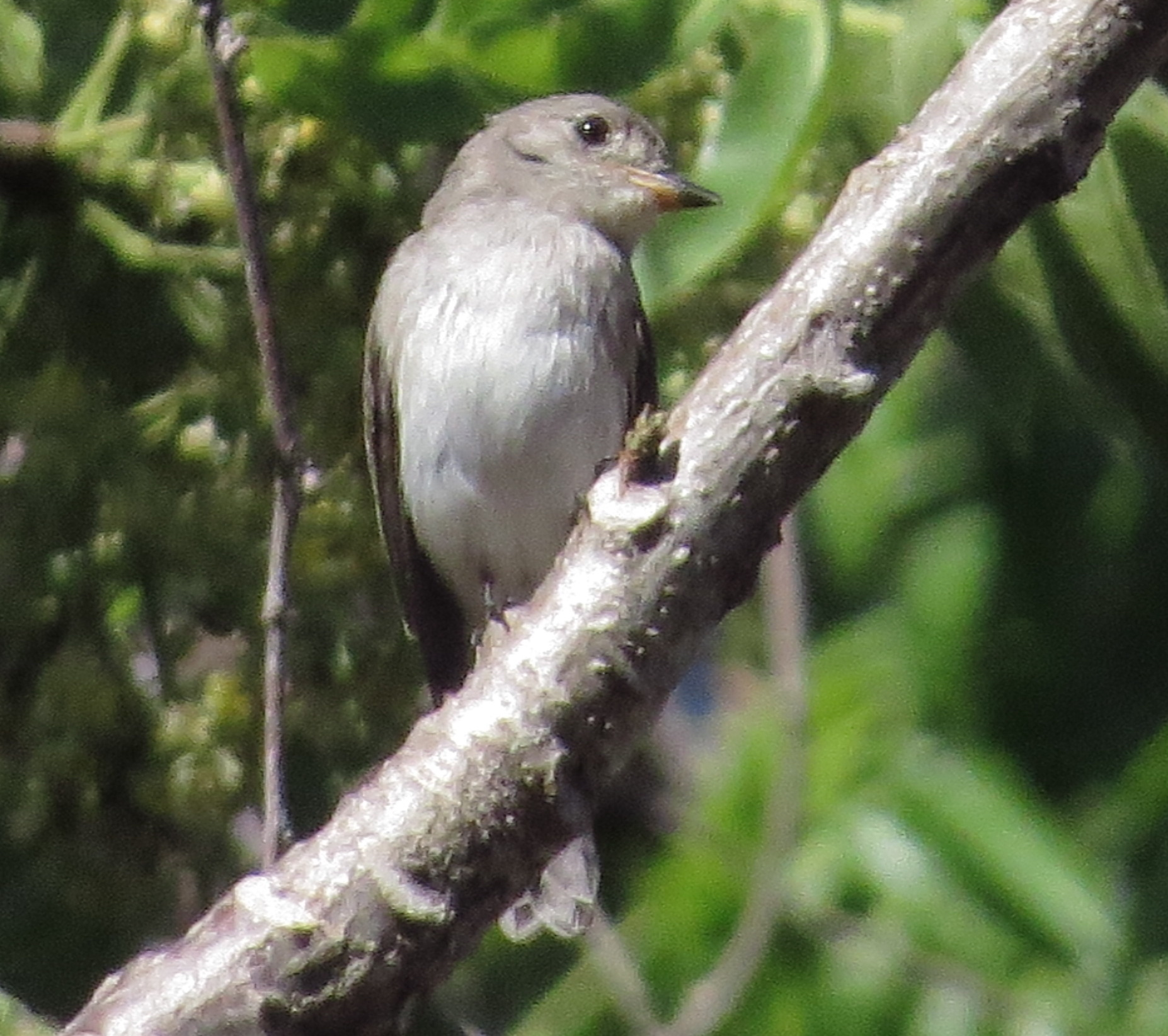

Conservation status
- Near Threatened (IUCN 3.1)

Scientific classification
- Kingdom: Animalia
- Phylum: Chordata
- Class: Aves
- Order: Passeriformes
- Family: Muscicapidae
- Genus: Muscicapa
- Species: M. segregata

Binomial name
- Muscicapa segregata (Siebers, 1928)

= Sumba brown flycatcher =

Species of bird

The Sumba brown flycatcher (Muscicapa segregata) is a species of bird in the family Muscicapidae. It is endemic to Indonesia.

Its natural habitat is subtropical or tropical moist lowland forests. It is threatened by habitat loss.
