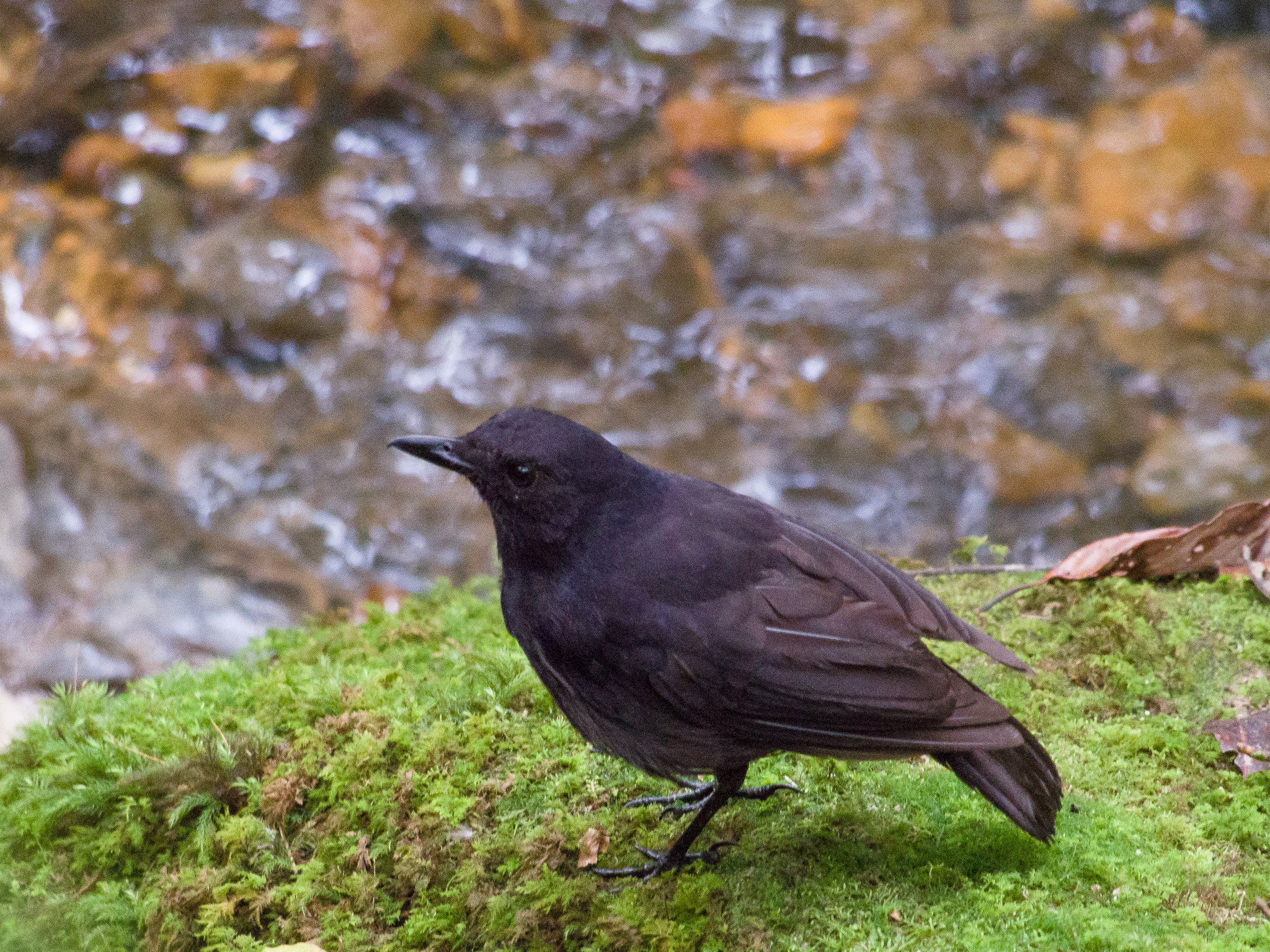

Conservation status
- Least Concern (IUCN 3.1)

Scientific classification
- Kingdom: Animalia
- Phylum: Chordata
- Class: Aves
- Order: Passeriformes
- Family: Muscicapidae
- Genus: Myophonus
- Species: M. borneensis

Binomial name
- Myophonus borneensis Slater, H.H., 1885

= Bornean whistling thrush =

Species of bird

The Bornean whistling thrush (Myophonus borneensis) is a species of bird in the family Muscicapidae. It is found in Indonesia and Malaysia, where it is endemic to the island of Borneo. Its natural habitat is subtropical or tropical moist montane forests.

On average, Borean whistling thrushes lay clutch sizes of about 2 eggs, which they incubate for about 18 days. The nesting period lasts 24 days.

They are threatened by climate change, especially droughts.

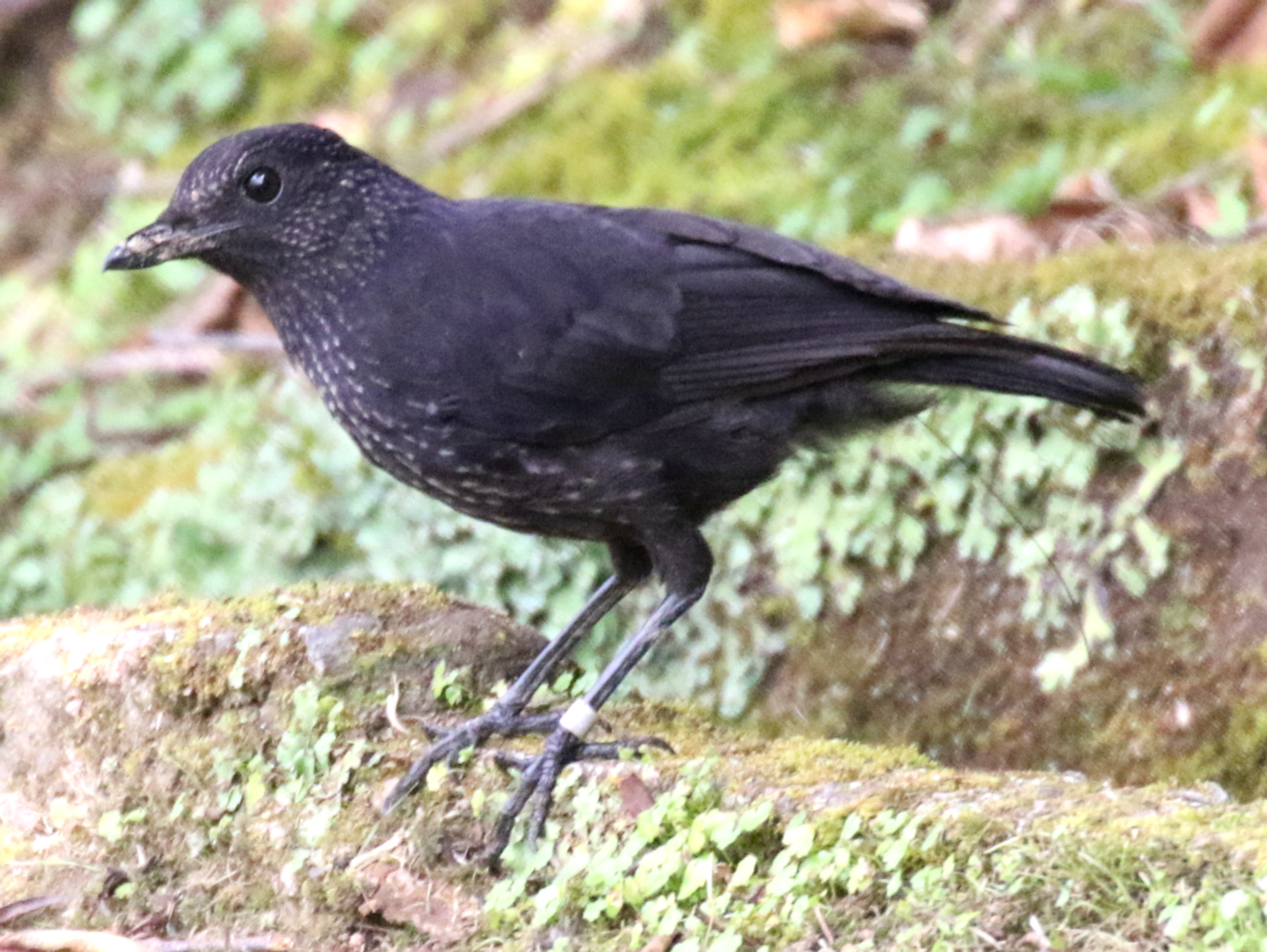
Mount Kinabalu National Park - Sabah, Borneo - Malaysia
