= Robert George Wardlaw-Ramsay =

British ornithologist

Colonel Robert Wardlaw-Ramsay FLS FZS DL
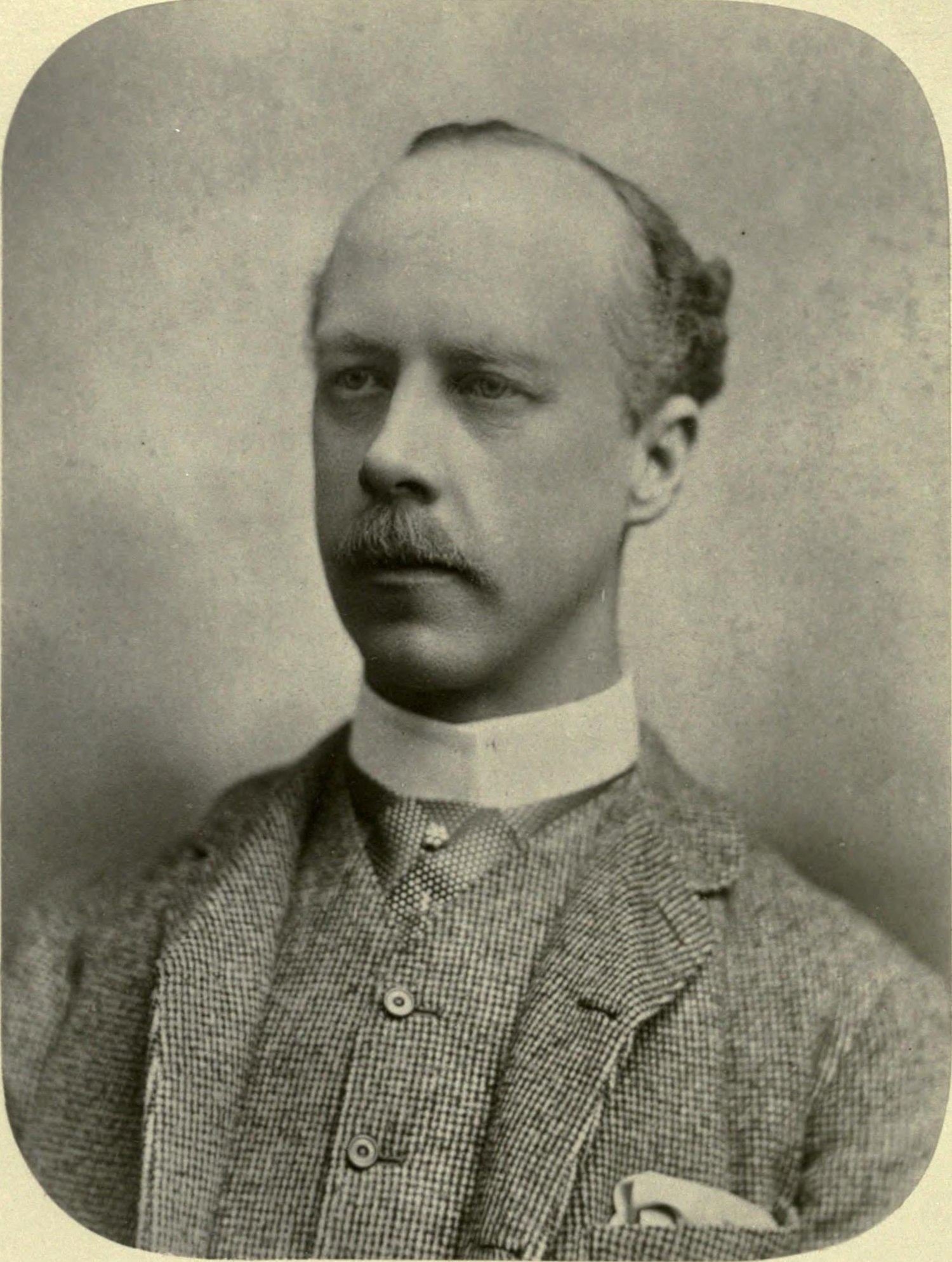
- Born: 25 January 1852
- Died: 22 April 1921 (aged 69)
- Military career
- Allegiance: United Kingdom
- Branch: British Army
- Service years: 1871–1883; 1883–1905; 1914–1919
- Rank: Colonel
- Unit: Royal Scots
- Conflicts: First Anglo-Afghan War; First World War

Colonel Robert George Wardlaw-Ramsay FLS FZS DL (25 January 1852 – 22 April 1921) was a British Army officer and naturalist.

== Early life ==
Wardlaw-Ramsay's father was Robert Balfour Wardlaw-Ramsay while his mother Louisa was the third daughter of George, eighth Marquess of Tweeddale. He studied at Cheam and Harrow before joining the Hampshire Regiment in January 1871 to be stationed in India, Afghanistan and Burma.

== Ornithology ==
Wardlaw-Ramsay's interest in birds began as a young boy and in 1872 (aged 20) he was elected a member of the British Ornithologists' Union and was later (1913-1918) to become its president. He was also a Fellow of the Zoological Society. During his various army postings he took a great interest in the local ornithology. He was a nephew of Arthur Hay, 9th Marquess of Tweeddale and inherited a large collection of over 20,000 bird skins that was later presented to the British Museum. He also edited The Ornithological works of Arthur 9th Marquis of Tweeddale (1881) and towards the end of his life was writing a Guide to the birds of Europe and North Africa (1923) which was published posthumously.

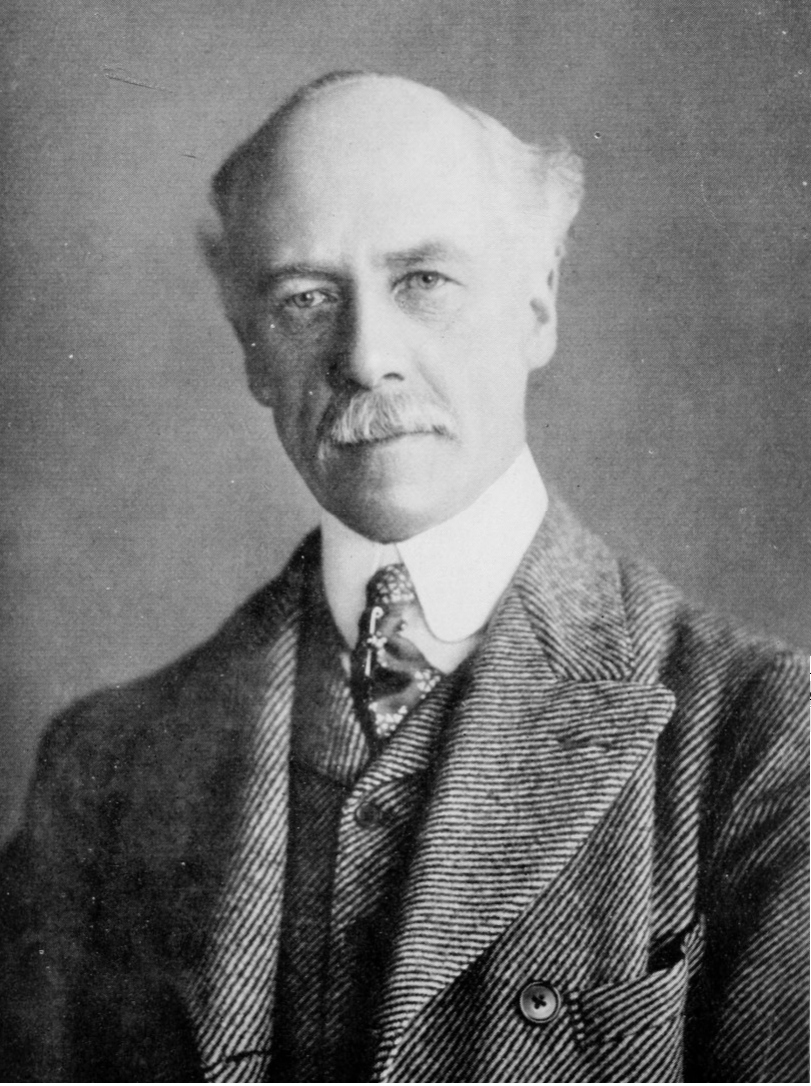
In later life

He was married to the elder daughter of Charles Swinton Hogg, Administrator-General of Bengal. He actively corresponded with other ornithologists in the region and many of his notes were published by Allan Octavian Hume in Stray Feathers.

== Military career ==
Wardlaw-Ramsay saw action during the First Anglo-Afghan War and also served in Burma and on the Andaman Islands. He later joined the Highland Light Infantry, becoming commander of the 7th Volunteer Battalion of the Royal Scots. He retired from the Army in 1882, shortly after the death of his father, and took to working in the County of Midlothian, where he served as Deputy Lieutenant.
