= Shortwing (bird) =

The shortwings are colourful, medium-sized, mostly insectivorous birds in the genus Brachypteryx of the Old World Flycatcher family Muscicapidae. They show strong sexual plumage dimorphism. All are southeast Asian species.

Most shortwings are place in the genus Brachypteryx.

- Rusty-bellied shortwing, Brachypteryx hyperythra
- Lesser shortwing, Brachypteryx leucophris
- White-browed shortwing, Brachypteryx montana

Three other species, formerly placed in Brachypteryx, are now in two other genera.

- Great shortwing, Heinrichia calligyna
- Nilgiri blue robin (also known at Nilgiri shortwing), Sholicola major
- Gould's shortwing, Heteroxenicus stellatus
