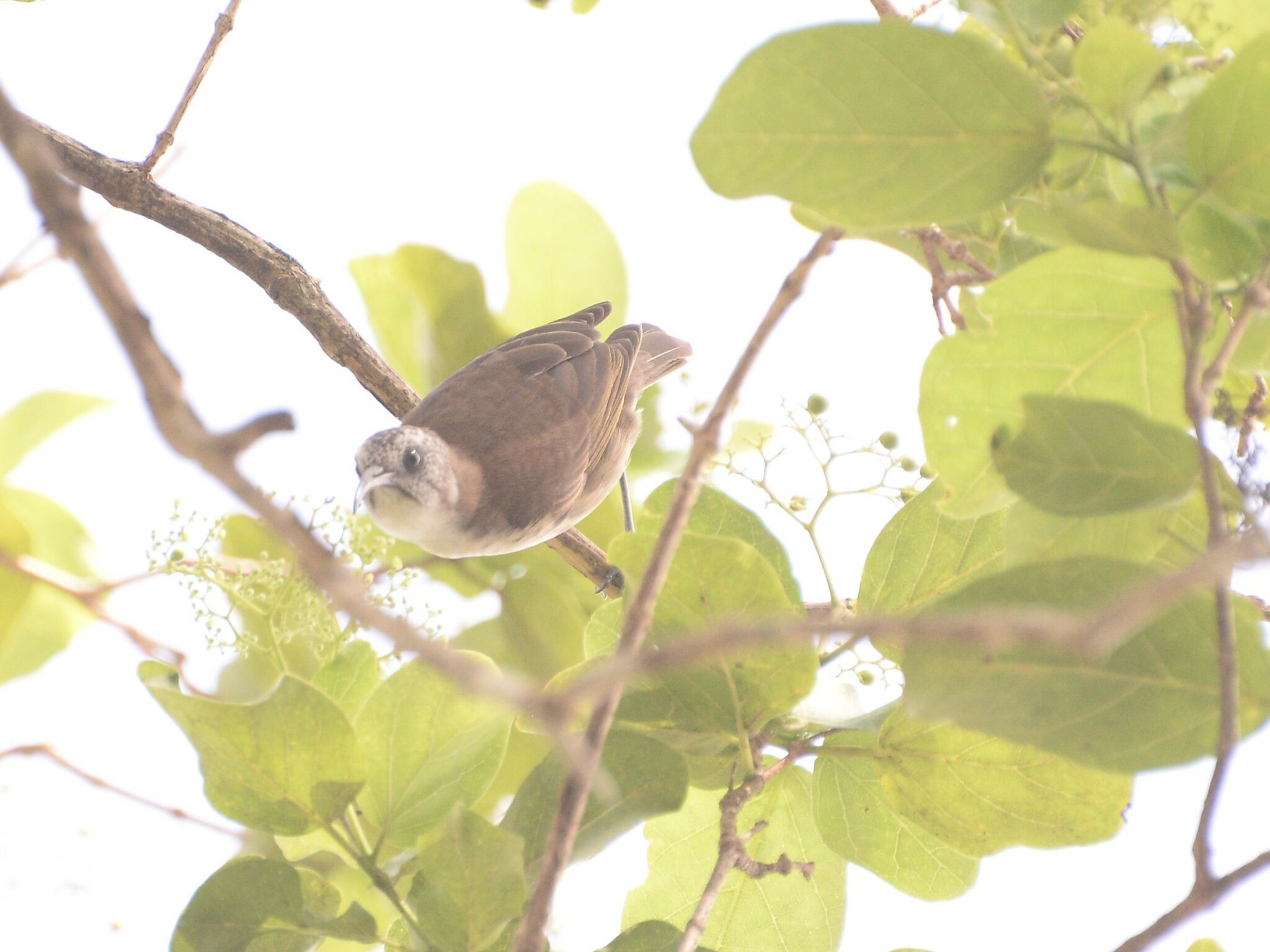
- White-bellied honeyeater on Vanua Lava in 2024

Conservation status
- Least Concern (IUCN 3.1)

Scientific classification
- Kingdom: Animalia
- Phylum: Chordata
- Class: Aves
- Order: Passeriformes
- Family: Meliphagidae
- Genus: Gliciphila
- Species: G. notabilis

Binomial name
- Gliciphila notabilis Sharpe, 1899

Synonyms
- Glyciphila notabilis Sharpe, 1899; Glycifohia gonada Mathews, 1929; Guadalcanaria notabilis Mayr, 1932; Phylidonyris notabilis Salom., 1967

= White-bellied honeyeater =

Species of bird

The white-bellied honeyeater (Gliciphila notabilis), also known as the Vanuatu honeyeater or New Hebrides honeyeater, is a species of bird in the family Meliphagidae. It is endemic to the Melanesian island nation of Vanuatu.

== Taxonomy ==
Gliciphila notabilis was first described in 1899 by Richard Bowdler Sharpe, who used the name Glyciphila for the genus rather than Gliciphila, with the type locality given as Vanua Lava, Banks Islands.

In October 1929, Gregory Macalister Mathews established the genus Glycifohia with the white-bellied honeyeater as its type species; (Note: Mathews used the name Glycifohia gonada for the species, "As Glyciphila notabilis is preoccupied by Finsch", referring to the black-necklaced honeyeater (Stigmatops notabilis Finsch, 1898); Ernst Mayr rejected this, appending "(sic!)" after Glycifohia gonada in the synonymy of Guadalcanaria notabilis notabilis.) in 1932 Ernst Mayr synonymized this new genus with Guadalcanaria, established in July 1929 by Ernst Hartert, while also splitting the white-bellied honeyeater up into two subspecies:

- G. n. notabilis Sharpe, RB, 1899 – Vanua Lava, Ureparapara, Espiritu Santo and Ambae
- G. n. superciliaris (Mayr, E, 1932) – Maewo, Pentecost, Malekula, Ambrym, Paama and Epi

The type for G. n superciliaris is a male collected on 4 August 1926 by Rollo Beck and José Correia, as part of the Whitney South Sea Expedition, with the type locality being Epi.

The species was again reassigned in 1967 as Finn Salomonsen synonymized Gliciphila and Glycifohia with Phylidonyris, following the view of Gerlof L. Mees that Gliciphila was an "artificial grouping". This treatment was not universally accepted: some authors continued to consider Glycifohia a separate genus, with G. notabilitis and G. undulata as its only members. Authors also disagreed on whether to return Gliciphila from the synonymy of Phylidonyris as a monotypic genus, containing only Gliciphila melanops.

The results of a 2014 molecular phylogenetics study established that Glycifohia should not be considered a synonym of Phylidonyris, but also suggested that G. notabilis and Gliciphila melanops are sister taxa, which would make a Glycifohia with only G. notabilis and G. undulata polyphyletic, leading the authors to synonymize Glycifohia with Gliciphila. (Note: The alternative of giving G. notabilis , G. undulata and G. melanops separate genuses was discussed but rejected, as it was deemed that the resulting set of names – Gliciphila melanops, Glycifohia undulata and Glyciphila notabilis (due to Sharpe's emending of Gliciphila to Glyciphila when originally describing G. notabilis) – was confusing and best avoided.) A 2017 study supported the latter of the 2014 study's results, but a 2022 study contradicted it, suggesting instead that it is G. notabilis and G. undulata that are sister taxa. As of 2026, the accepted nomenclature continues to be to consider the three species to belong to Gliciphila.
