= Samoan white-eye =

Conservation status
- Near Threatened (IUCN 3.1)

Scientific classification
- Kingdom: Animalia
- Phylum: Chordata
- Class: Aves
- Order: Passeriformes
- Family: Zosteropidae
- Genus: Zosterops
- Species: Z. samoensis

Binomial name
- Zosterops samoensis Murphy & Mathews, 1929

Species of bird

The Samoan white-eye (Zosterops samoensis) (Matapapae) is a species of bird in the family Zosteropidae. It is endemic to the island of Savaiʻi in Samoa.

Its natural habitats are subtropical or tropical moist montane forests and subtropical or tropical high-altitude shrubland, generally at elevations greater than 1km. It is threatened by habitat loss.

== Taxonomy ==
The Samoan white-eye was formally described in 1929 by American naturalist Robert Cushman Murphy and Australian naturalist Gregory Mathews based on samples collected for the American Museum of Natural History during the Whitney South Sea Expedition. They placed it with other white-eyes in the genus Zosterops and coined the binomial name Zosterops samoensis. There are no subspecies.

== Description ==
The Samoan white-eye is a small bird with a length of 10 - 11cm. It has a green back, beige underside, and yellow throat. There is a white eye-ring. The eyes have a yellow iris and the bill is horny brown. It is very similar to the Santa Cruz white-eye, though with a different iris colour and shorter tarsus.

== Behaviour ==
The bird feeds on fruit and nectar in the forest canopy. It travels in flocks of 10-20 indvduals, and has been seen in groups of up to 40. Fledglings have been observed in May.

In March of 2026, the species was added to a list made by Search for Lost Birds, an organization aimed at rediscovering bird species not seen in the last 10 years or more, along with the Mindoro bleeding-heart (Last seen in 2005), Minahasa shortwing, Vanikoro white-eye, Mindoro imperial pigeon, and the Guadalcanal honeyeater. It was recently found in August 2026, on Savai'i.

== See also ==
- Samoan tropical moist forests
