= Vanikoro white-eye =

Conservation status
- Least Concern (IUCN 3.1)

Scientific classification
- Kingdom: Animalia
- Phylum: Chordata
- Class: Aves
- Order: Passeriformes
- Family: Zosteropidae
- Genus: Zosterops
- Species: Z. gibbsi

Binomial name
- Zosterops gibbsi Dutson, 2008

Species of bird

The Vanikoro white-eye (Zosterops gibbsi) is a species of bird in the family Zosteropidae. It is endemic to Vanikoro in the Santa Cruz Islands of Temotu Province in the south-east of the Solomon Islands chain. The species is named for David Gibbs, who discovered it.

== Description ==
The Vanikoro white-eye differs from its geographically closest congener, the Santa Cruz white-eye (Zosterops sanctaecrucis), by several features including a much longer bill and different eye-ring and leg colouring.

== Habitat ==
The Santa Cruz Islands lie in the Vanuatu rain forests ecoregion. Within its range the Vanikoro white-eye is common in upland forests although it also occurs in degraded lowland forests.

== Behaviour ==
Observations of the nest of the Vanikoro white-eye suggest that it is a cooperative breeder, with additional helpers aiding the breeding pair, an unusual trait in Zosterops white-eyes. The nest of this species is a deep bowl of woven grass stems. The species forages in trees and frequently feeds on the trunks of trees and on the underside of branches.

== Status ==
This species has been assessed by BirdLife International in 2016 as being one of Least Concern. The upland forests that comprise its main habitat are not thought to be threatened by deforestation and the island is seldom visited, reducing opportunities for the accidental introduction of dangerous invasive species, so the species is probably not threatened at the moment.

In March 2026, the species was added to a list made by Search for Lost Birds, an organization aimed at rediscovering bird species not seen in the last 10 years or more, along with the Mindoro bleeding-heart (Last seen in 2005), Minahasa shortwing, Samoan white-eye, Mindoro imperial pigeon, and the Guadalcanal honeyeater.
