= David Gibbs (naturalist) =

British naturalist

David Gibbs (born 26 November 1958) is a British naturalist. His main research fields are ornithology, entomology, and ecology.

== Career ==
After attending secondary and comprehensive school from 1970 to 1977 he visited the Langley College of Higher Education in Langley, Berkshire from 1977 to 1979. In 1980 he joined the University of Sheffield where he graduated in 1983.

Gibbs has worked as a professional survey entomologist since 1984. From 1991 he has been a freelancer. In particular he studied Diptera, Hymenoptera, and Hemiptera. In 2007 and 2009, he described the newly discovered bee flies Mythenteles andalusiaca from Andalusia and Mythenteles rameli from Greece.

Besides several papers on birds, insects, and ecology, Gibbs contributed to the books Irian Jaya, Indonesia, 21 January – 12 March 1991. With notes from 1992: A site guide for birdwatchers (1993), Wallacea (1996), and Pigeons and Doves: A Guide to the Pigeons and Doves of the World (2001, with Eustace Barnes and John Cox).

In 1994, Gibbs discovered the Vanikoro white-eye (Zosterops gibbsi) which was scientifically described and named for him by Guy Dutson in 2008.
