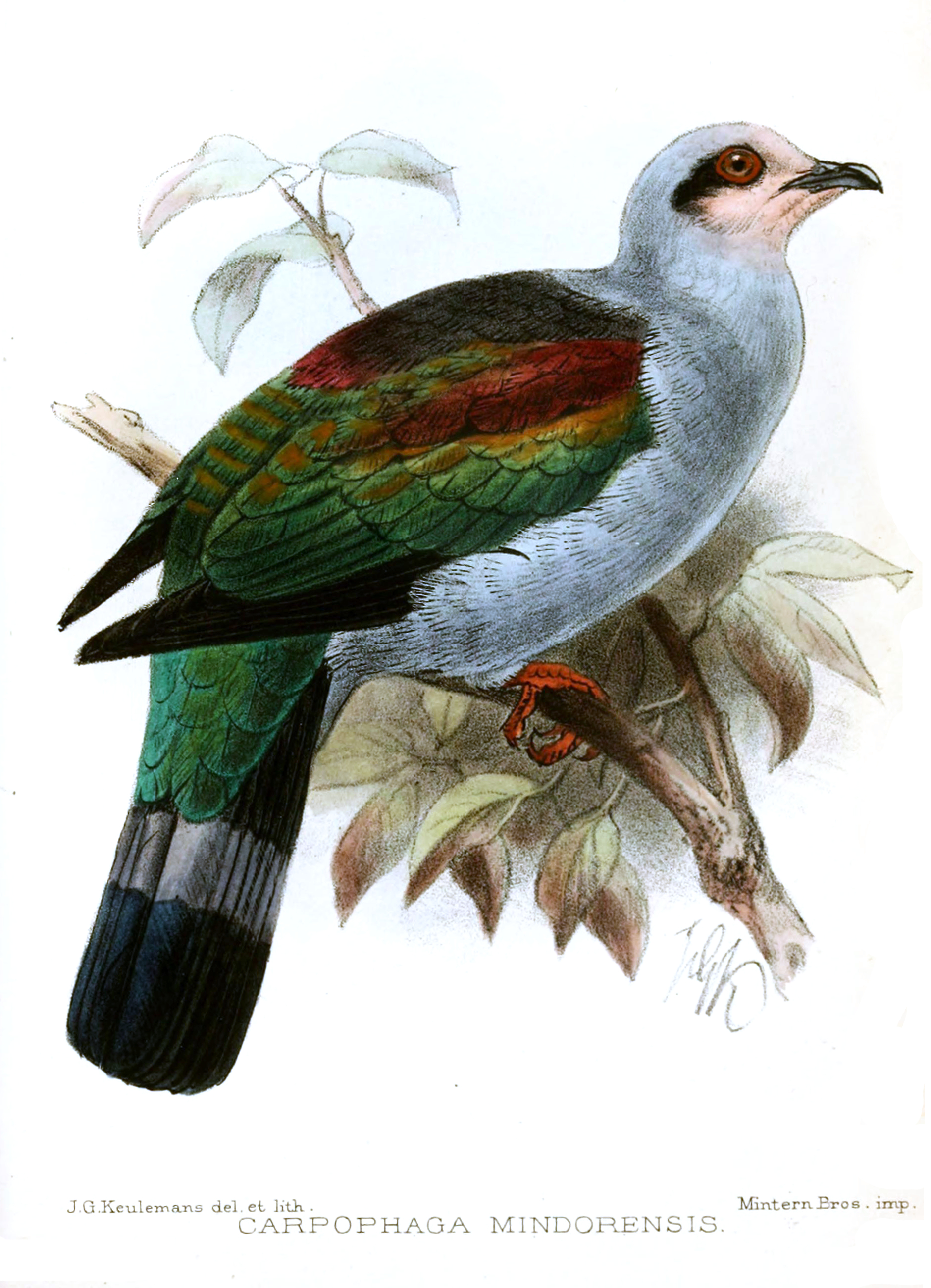

Conservation status
- Near Threatened (IUCN 3.1)
- CITES Appendix I

Scientific classification
- Kingdom: Animalia
- Phylum: Chordata
- Class: Aves
- Order: Columbiformes
- Family: Columbidae
- Genus: Ducula
- Species: D. mindorensis

Binomial name
- Ducula mindorensis (Whitehead, 1896)

= Mindoro imperial pigeon =

Species of bird

The Mindoro imperial pigeon (Ducula mindorensis), also known as Mindoro zone-tailed pigeon (Zonophaps mindorensis), Great Mindoro pigeon or Pink-throated Imperial pigeon, is a bird species in the family Columbidae. It is endemic to the mountains of Mindoro in central Philippines and is the largest pigeon in the country reaching 50cm in length.

It is classified as a Near-threatened species according to the IUCN Red List. Its main threats are habitat loss and hunting. The IUCN Red List roughly estimates the population to be 800 to 3,000 remaining mature individuals.

In 2025, this species was once considered lost as no public photos were available since it was last photographed 2015. However, it was reported in 2026 that it was actualluy photographed in 2019 but was only publicly released then. This species was once again photographed in 2026 by the same members of the team of the Center for Conservation Innovations.

== Description ==
The Mindoro imperial pigeon is the largest Philippine pigeon. It measures from 42cm to 50cm in length. Its wings are about 24cm long and its tail measures from 15cm to 17cm. Its forehead and throat are both pinkish grey. The head, neck and most underparts are bluish grey, darkest on the belly and under the tail. The hind neck goes from dark grey to black around the upper part of its back. The rest of the back and the inner wings go from a bronzy red colour to a green colour. The majority of the upper parts of the bird are emerald green. It has a black ring around and extending behind the eye. The tail is greenish black with an obvious grey band in the centre. The feathers under the tail are grey with a cinnamon coloured tinge. They have a black bill and their legs are pinkish red. In males, the iris is bright yellow, and the eyelids are red. In females, the iris is brownish yellow, and the eyelids are yellow orange. No information on juvenile plumage was recorded.

== Taxonomy ==
The Mindoro imperial pigeon is a bird from the genus Ducula, otherwise known as the group consisting of imperial pigeons. The species Ducula mindorensis, formerly known as Carpophaga mindorensis and Zonophaps mindorensis, was first described by John Whitehead in 1896. Together with Ducula radiata, it forms a superspecies. It is also known to be closely related to Ducula poliocephala and Ducula forsteni, and these three species together may relate Ptilinopus fruit doves to other imperial pigeons.

== Behaviour ==
The Mindoro imperial pigeon can be seen singly, in pairs or in groups up to four individuals. This species tends to roost together with Ducula poliocephala and Columba vitiensis in the canopy. They tend to be inconspicuous, making it difficult to observe when roosting.

=== Vocalization ===
No recordings were found, but it is known to be a distinct disyllabic call. Their voice is similar to the other imperial pigeons of Mindoro, but much more resonant and deeper. The Mindoro imperial pigeon's call is frequently heard at dawn.

=== Diet ===
Little to no information is known about their diet. The Mindoro imperial pigeon was seen feeding on fruits, from small berries up to large ones as big as the size of a pigeon's egg.

=== Reproduction ===
No information can be found about their breeding behaviours. One male was recorded as being in breeding conditions in April and one immature was found in August.

== Habitat and conservation status ==
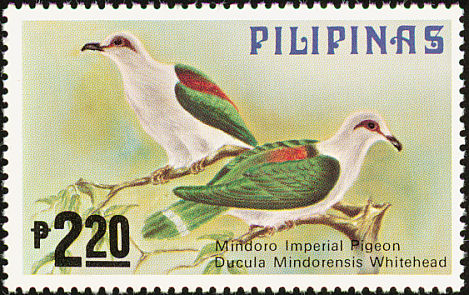
A Philippine Postal stamp from 1979 featuring the Mindoro imperial pigeon

The Mindoro imperial pigeon is distributed throughout Mindoro, where sufficient closed canopy forests remain. They used to be found mostly in mountain forests above 1000m. However, in 1991, most of the observations were made in understory trees of the remaining low altitude forests of Mindoro (800-950m). IUCN previously assessed this bird as Endangered with an estimate of 600 - 1,700 mature individuals but in 2024 this species was reassessed as Near-threatened species with a population estimate of 800 - 3,000 mature individuals. This revised estimate is not a sign that numbers are increasing but rather a reassessment of a very rough estimates based on theorized population density and its theorized extent of occurrence. This species is rare and uncommon but known to be found more easily in Mount Ilong and Mount Halcon. Its habitat is threatened by logging, cultivation, deforestation and forest destruction.

Conservation actions proposed include more surveys to better understand population, distribution and ecology, along with efforts to protect the remaining forest on Mount Halcon and lobby for higher priority protection status.

In March of 2026, the species was added to a list made by Search for Lost Birds, an organization aimed at rediscovering bird species not seen in the last 10 years or more, along with the Mindoro bleeding-heart (Last seen in 2005), Minahasa shortwing, Samoan white-eye, Vanikoro white-eye, and the Guadalcanal honeyeater.
