= Shortwing =

Shortwing may refer to:

- Shortwing (bird)
- Shortwing, a falconer's word for Accipiters ("true hawks")
- Shortwing, a common name for Perilestidae, a family of damselflies in the order Odonata
