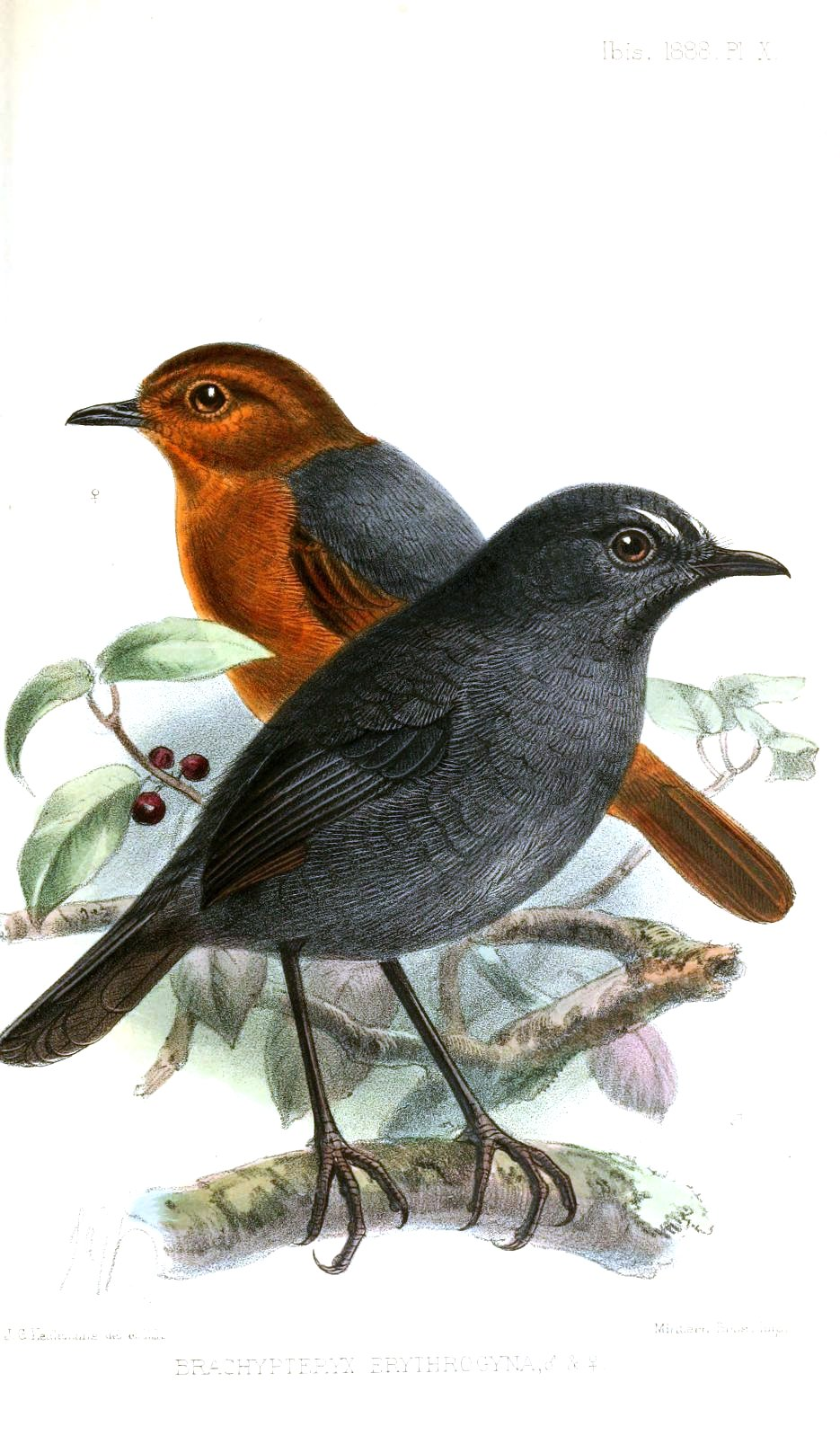
- White-browed shortwing, (Brachypteryx montana)

Scientific classification
- Kingdom: Animalia
- Phylum: Chordata
- Class: Aves
- Order: Passeriformes
- Family: Muscicapidae
- Subfamily: Saxicolinae
- Genus: Brachypteryx; Horsfield, 1821

Type species
- Brachypteryx montana Horsfield, 1821

= Brachypteryx =

Genus of birds

Brachypteryx is a genus of passerine birds in the family Muscicapidae containing ten species known as shortwings, that occurs in southeast Asia.

Shortwings are small birds with long legs, finely pointed bills, short tails and short rounded wings. They are shy elusive ground-dwellers that generally prefer the cover of dense undergrowth.

== Taxonomy ==
The genus Brachypteryx was introduced by the American naturalist Thomas Horsfield in 1821. Horsfield listed several species in the new genus but did not specify a type species. In 1855 the English zoologist George Gray designated the type as Brachypteryx montana Horsfield, the Javan shortwing. The genus name comes from the classical Greek brakhus mean "short" and pterux meaning "wing". The genus was previously placed in the thrush family Turdidae but in 2010 two separate molecular phylogenetic studies found that species in the genus were more closely related to members of the Old World flycatcher family Muscicapidae.

The genus contains the following ten species:

Image	Common name	Scientific name	Distribution
	Himalayan shortwing	Brachypteryx cruralis	eastern Himalayas, southern China and Indochina
	Chinese shortwing	Brachypteryx sinensis	South China
	Taiwan shortwing	Brachypteryx goodfellowi	Taiwan
	Rusty-bellied shortwing	Brachypteryx hyperythra	Sikkim, Northeast-India and Yunnan
	Lesser shortwing	Brachypteryx leucophris	Eastern Himalaya, southern China and Southeast Asia
	Philippine shortwing	Brachypteryx poliogyna	Philippines
	Bornean shortwing	Brachypteryx erythrogyna	montane Borneo
	Sumatran shortwing	Brachypteryx saturata	montane Sumatra
	Javan shortwing	Brachypteryx montana	montane Java
	Flores shortwing	Brachypteryx floris	Flores

Whilst the Javan and rusty-bellied shortwings show strong sexual plumage dimorphism, the lesser shortwing is sexually monomorphic.

Three other species were formerly placed in Brachypteryx:

- Great shortwing, Heinrichia calligyna
- Nilgiri blue robin or Nilgiri shortwing Myiomela major
- Gould's shortwing, Heteroxenicus stellata
