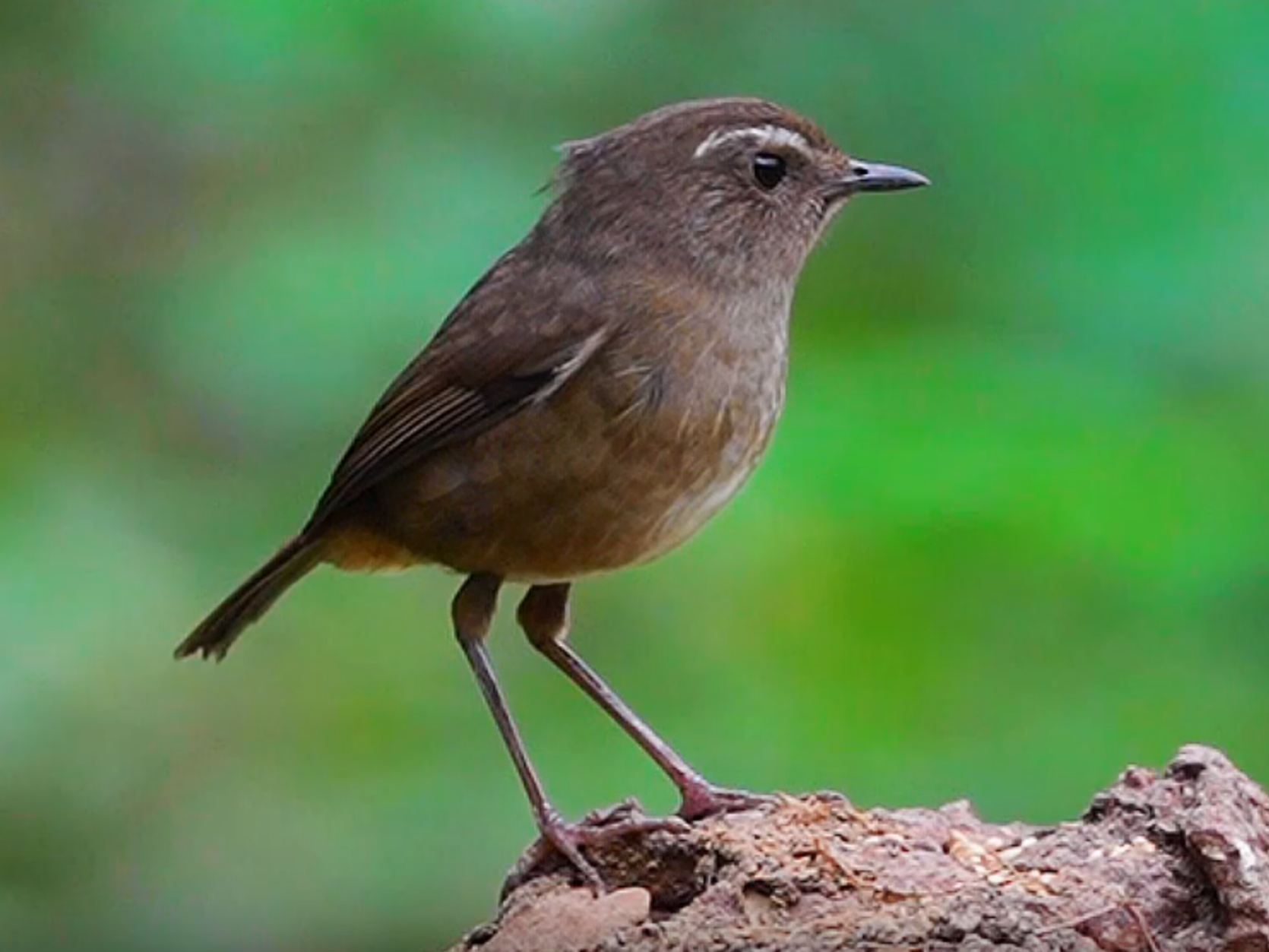

Conservation status
- Least Concern (IUCN 3.1)

Scientific classification
- Kingdom: Animalia
- Phylum: Chordata
- Class: Aves
- Order: Passeriformes
- Family: Muscicapidae
- Genus: Brachypteryx
- Species: B. goodfellowi

Binomial name
- Brachypteryx goodfellowi Ogilvie-Grant, 1912

= Taiwan shortwing =

Species of bird

The Taiwan shortwing (Brachypteryx goodfellowi) is a species of chat. This species is now classified in the family Muscicapidae.

It is endemic to Taiwan. Its natural habitat is subtropical or tropical moist montane forests. It is a shy skulker, preferring to be on or near the ground, in the depths of dark vegetation, where it feeds on small insects, larvae, berries, seeds, sprouts and new buds of plants. The nest consists of moss and grass stems, placed in a dense shrub.
