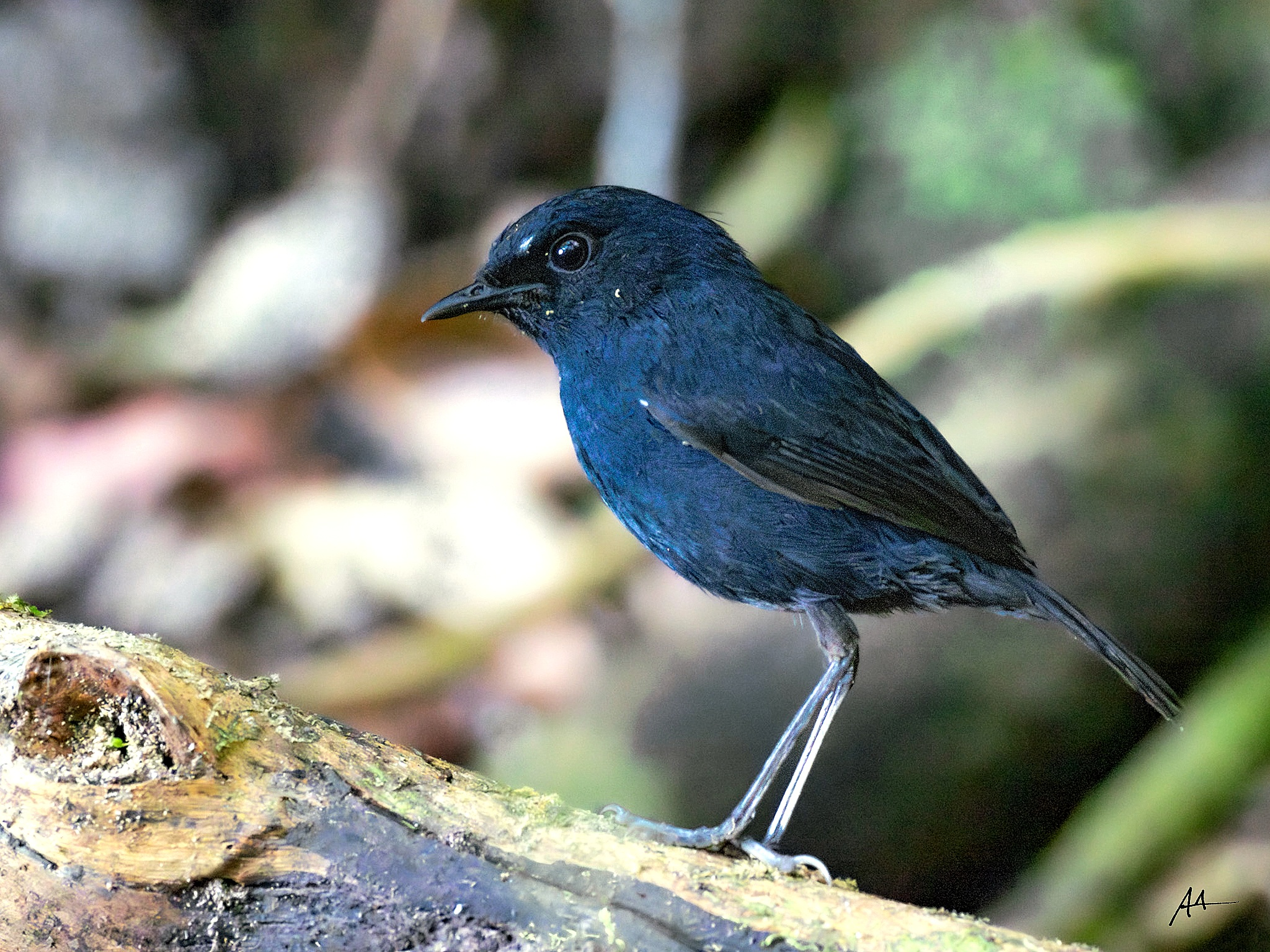
- Male ssp. andersoni on Mount Banahaw, Luzon
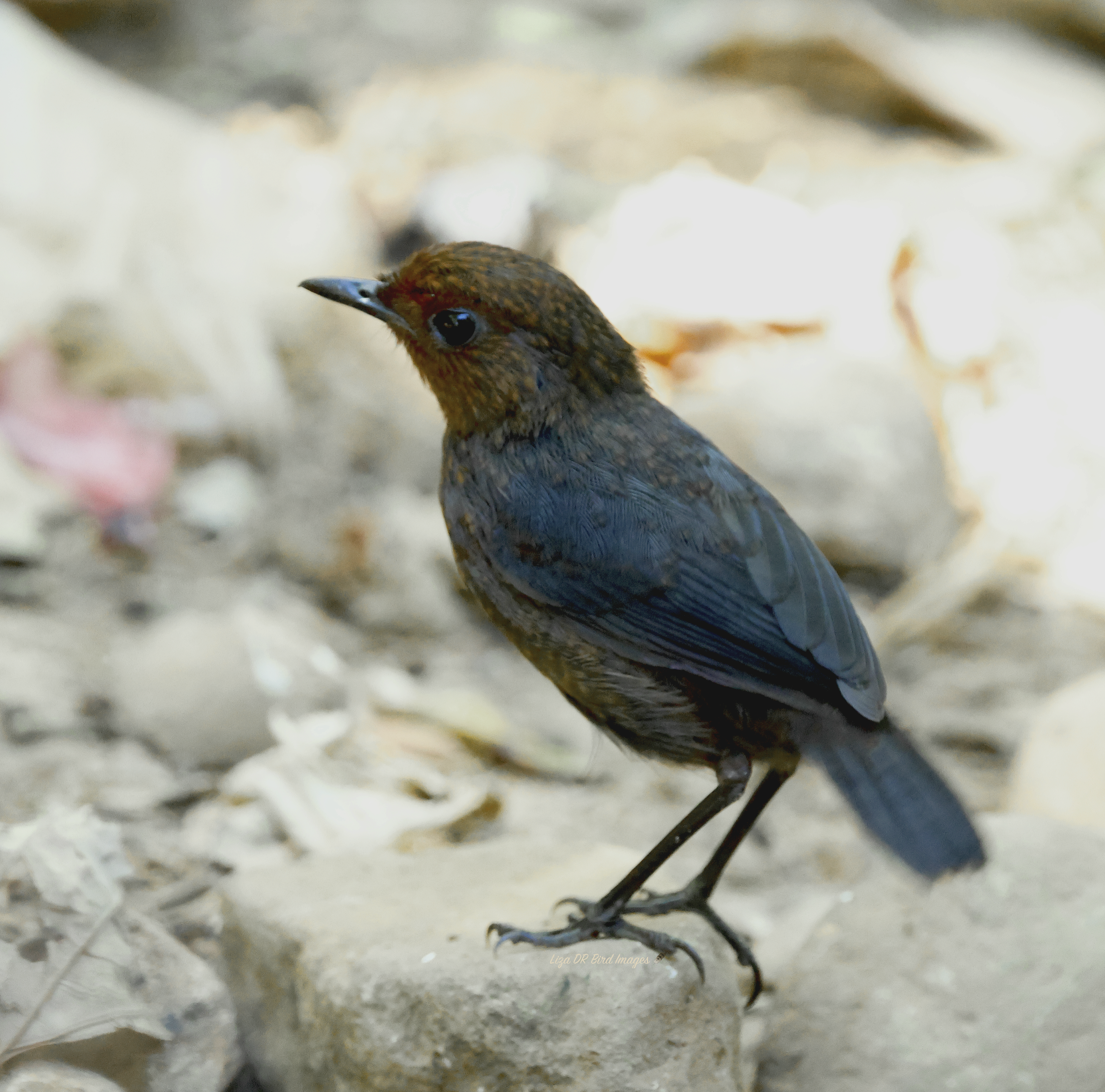
- Female sub-adult ssp. andersoni on Mount Banahaw, Luzon

Conservation status
- Least Concern (IUCN 3.1)

Scientific classification
- Kingdom: Animalia
- Phylum: Chordata
- Class: Aves
- Order: Passeriformes
- Family: Muscicapidae
- Genus: Brachypteryx
- Species: B. poliogyna

Binomial name
- Brachypteryx poliogyna Ogilvie-Grant, 1895

= Philippine shortwing =

Species of bird

The Philippine shortwing (Brachypteryx poliogyna) is a species of bird in the family Muscicapidae. It is endemic to the Philippines where it favours montane forest. It was once conspecific with the White-browed Shortwing.

== Description and taxonomy ==
Ebird describes the celestial monarch as "A small, dark songster of montane rainforest floor and undergrowth in the Philippines. Male is overall dark, blue-gray with an indistinct, often concealed white eyebrow. Female has a dark gray body with a paler belly, and brown head and base to the undertail. Forages on the ground of various types of forest, including bamboo, fern, and mossy forest. Song is an up-and-down melody of long whistles, broken into short separate notes. Call, a repeated, soft double-note "biirrick!"

This species was formerly considered as subspecies of the white-browed shortwing, now the Javan shortwing (Brachypteryx montana). The white-browed shortwing was split into five separate species based on the deep genetic difference between the populations coupled with the significant differences in plumage and vocalization.

=== Subspecies ===
Seven subspecies are recognised:

- B. p. poliogyna Ogilvie-Grant, 1895 – montane north Luzon (north Philippines)
- B. p. andersoni Rand & Rabor, 1967 – montane south Luzon (north Philippines); similar to the nominate but female is overall darker especially on the crown belly and vent
- B. p. mindorensis Hartert, EJO, 1916 – montane Mindoro (northwest Philippines); similar to the nominate but the male is slightly darker
- B. p. sillimani Ripley & Rabor, 1962 – montane Palawan (southwest Philippines); males have a dark gray-blue head, females have a rusty throat and grayish blue underparts
- B. p. brunneiceps Ogilvie-Grant, 1896 – montane Negros and Panay (central west Philippines); smaller, males have a blackish-blue head and females have darker underparts
- B. p. malindangensis Mearns, 1909 – Mount Malindang (Zamboanga Peninsula, Mindanao, south Philippines); extremely similar to brunneiceps with a less pronnounced white supercilium
- B. p. mindanensis Mearns, 1905 – Mount Apo, southeast Mindanao (south Philippines); extremely similar to malindangensis but brighter upperparts and a pronnounced white supercilium

All subspecies have variations in their calls. There is also an undescribed subspecies on South Cotabato which call is very different and is only found 800-1,000 masl. The higher elevation Mindanao subspecies group are candidates for a further splitting due to a very different calls compared to both its mid-elevation counterpart and the rest of the Philippines. Further work is needed on the taxonomy of this species complex but it is believed that there are at least 3 distinct species.

== Ecology and behavior ==
The diet of consists of insects. Forages in leaf litter near or beside mossy logs and usually stays well hidden.

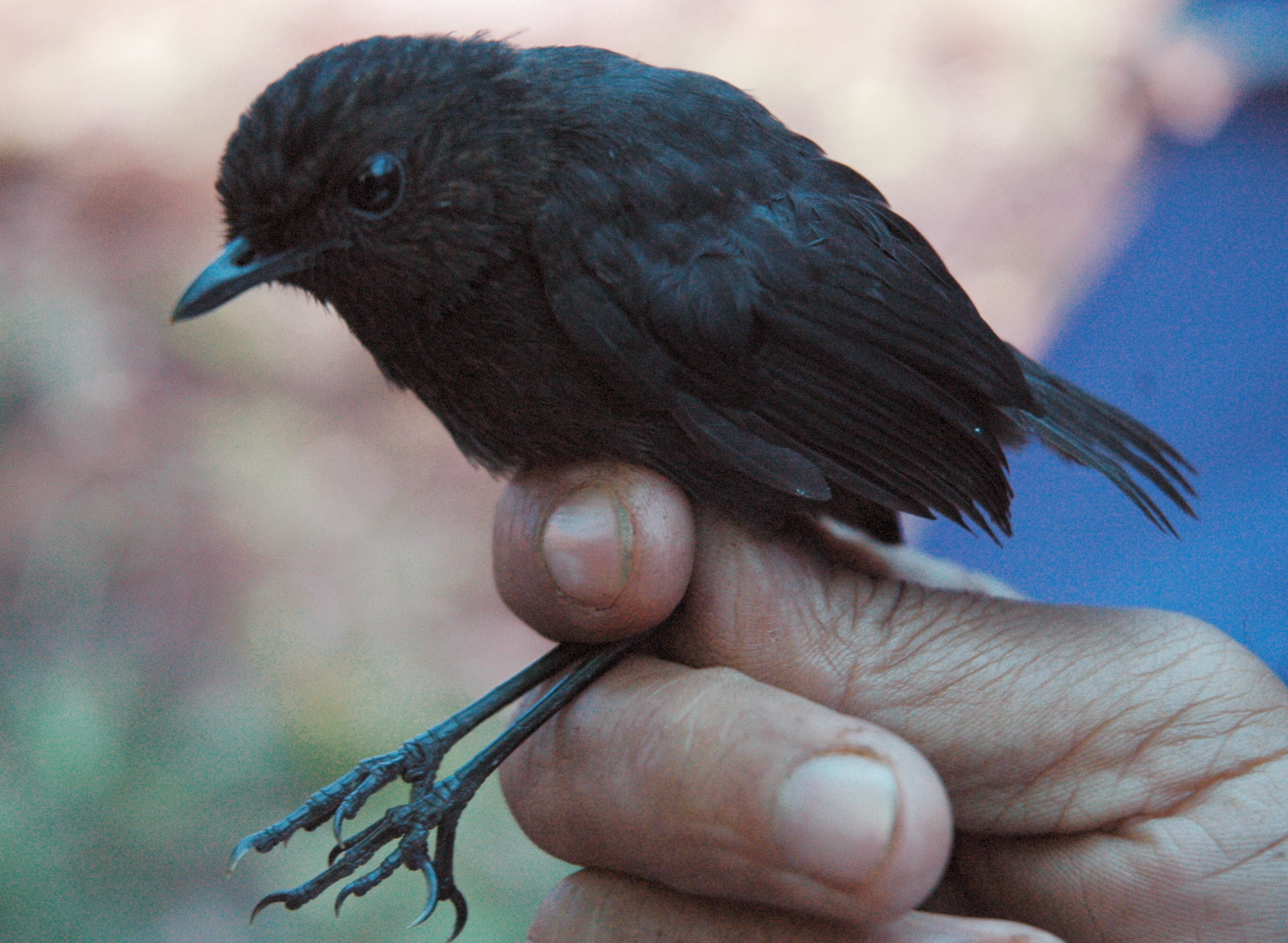
An immature ssp. mindanensis on Mount Hamiguitan

Mainly vocal in the early morning and late afternoon. Calls from a perch close to the ground. Flicks its wings and spreads its tail when alarmed and agitated.

Believed to breed in February to August but there are likely differences per subspecies. Nests close to the ground on fallen tree trunks, vines and bushes. Nest is described as a well hidden dome of moss, bamboo, grass, roots and ferns. Entrance is built on the side. Lays 2 to 3 white and glossy eggs.

== Habitat and conservation status ==
Its natural habitat is tropical moist montane forest above 600 meters above sea level.

IUCN has assessed this bird as least-concern species but the population is still decreasing due to deforestation.
