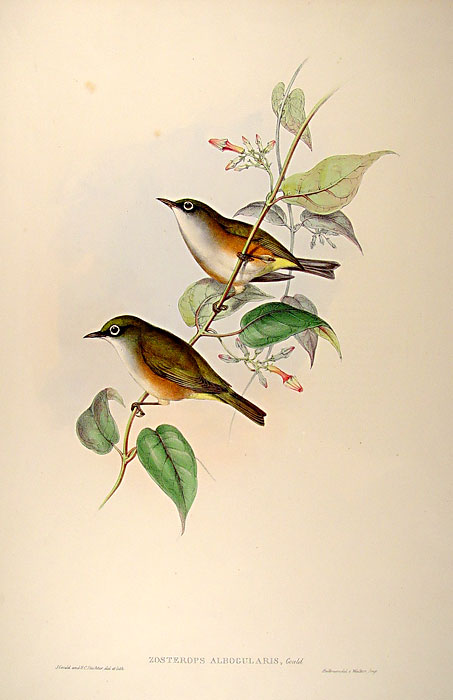
- (John Gould artwork)

Conservation status
- Extinct (2000) (IUCN 3.1)
- CITES Appendix I

Scientific classification
- Kingdom: Animalia
- Phylum: Chordata
- Class: Aves
- Order: Passeriformes
- Family: Zosteropidae
- Genus: Zosterops
- Species: †Z. albogularis

Binomial name
- †Zosterops albogularis Gould, 1837

= White-chested white-eye =

Species of bird

The white-chested white-eye (Zosterops albogularis) also known as white-breasted white-eye or Norfolk white-eye was a passerine from the family Zosteropidae. It was endemic to Norfolk Island between New Caledonia and New Zealand and was regarded as either extremely rare or possibly extinct. Since 2000 the Australian government has considered the species extinct.

== Description ==
It had a length up 13 to 14 centimetres and therefore it was one of the largest white-eyes ever recorded. Its wingspan was 7.5 cm and its weight was about 30 grams. Its appearance was characterised by a pale green head, an olive green coloured neck and white throat and belly parts. A further feature of the bird was a conspicuous eye ring of white feathers. Males and females were coloured similarly. Its diet consisted of fruits, berries, nectar, and insects. Its only habitat was a 5 km² large forested area around Mount Pitt on Norfolk Island where it lived solitary. In the breeding season from October to December, the couple would build a cup-shaped nest in which around two white eggs were laid. The incubation time would last eleven days and the juveniles would become fully fledged another eleven days later.

== Threats ==
The largest threats are habitat destruction and invasive species. The decline of the white-chested white-eye began as the introduced silvereye (Zosterops lateralis) became naturalised on Norfolk Island. It displaced the white-chested white-eye from its breeding range. From the 1940s, rats destroyed nests and clearing of forests led to a severe decline in the population to only 50 individuals in 1962. In 1986, the Norfolk Island National Park was established to save this bird from extinction, but because of the fluctuation of this species, surveys often remained unsuccessful. In 1978, only four individuals were monitored, and a sighting in 2000 resulted in one individual; bird watchers claimed to have seen the bird in 2005. However, official surveys have not recorded the species since 1980. A predator-exclusion fence was built around the last remaining habitat in the Norfolk Island National Park. A survey by ornithologist Guy Dutson in 2009 failed to find any individuals.
