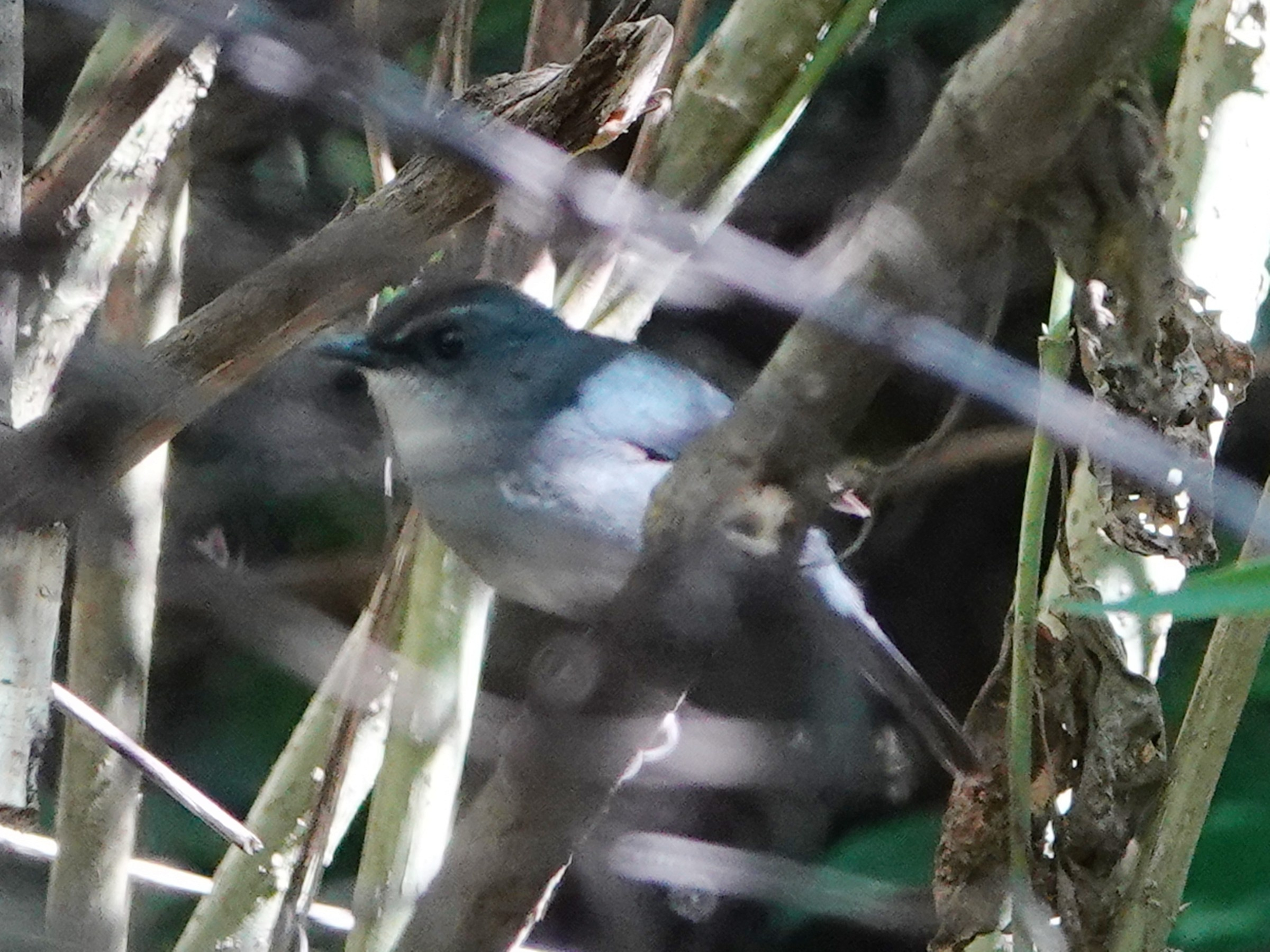

Conservation status
- Least Concern (IUCN 3.1)

Scientific classification
- Kingdom: Animalia
- Phylum: Chordata
- Class: Aves
- Order: Passeriformes
- Family: Muscicapidae
- Genus: Brachypteryx
- Species: B. floris

Binomial name
- Brachypteryx floris Hartert, EJO, 1897

= Flores shortwing =

Species of bird

The Flores shortwing (Brachypteryx floris) is a species of bird in the Old World flycatcher family Muscicapidae. It is endemic to the island of Flores in the Lesser Sunda Islands where it favours montane forest.

This species was formerly considered as a subspecies of the white-browed shortwing, now the Javan shortwing (Brachypteryx montana). The white-browed shortwing was split into five separate species based on the deep genetic difference between the populations coupled with the significant differences in plumage and vocalization. The Flores shortwing is monotypic: no subspecies are recognised.
