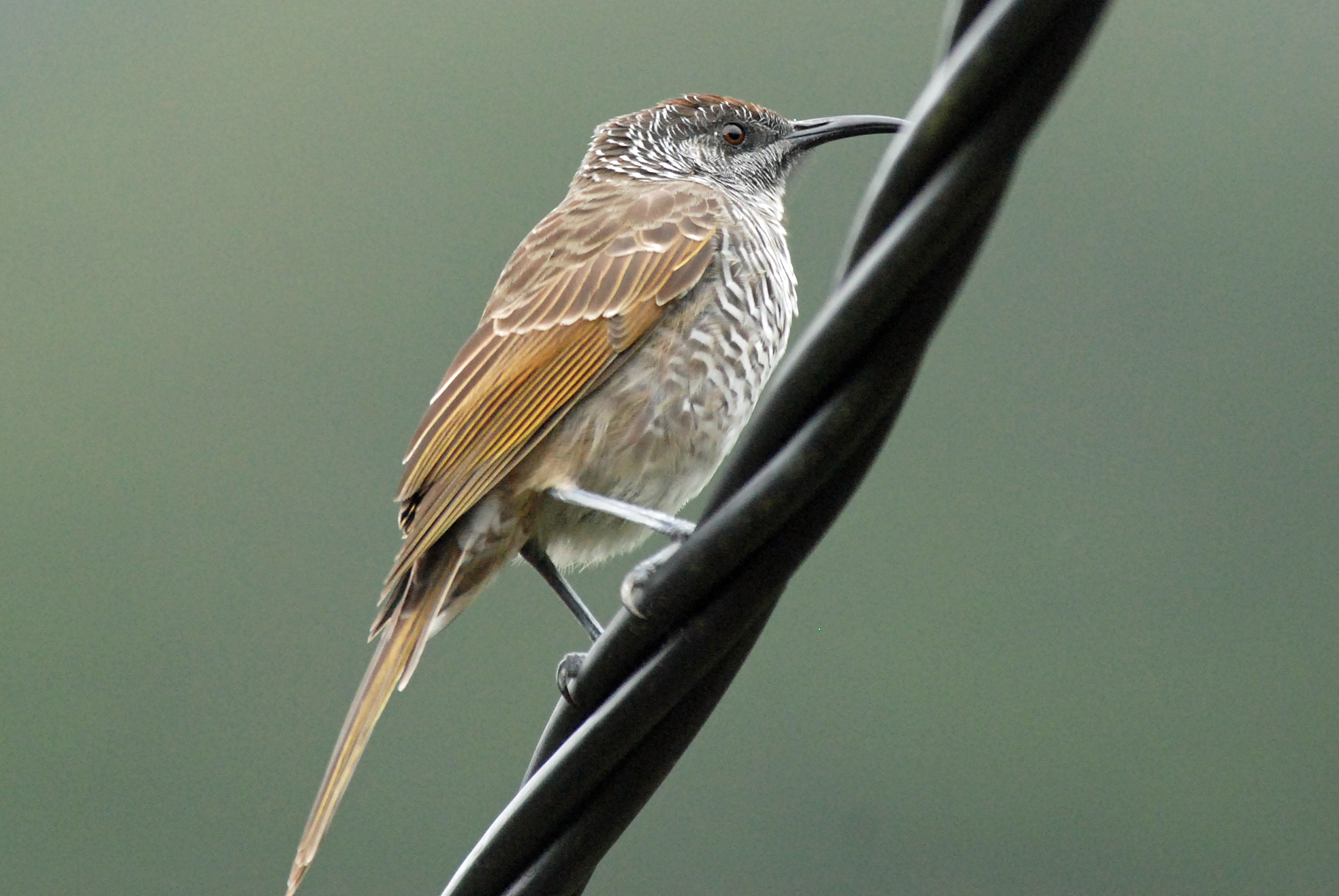
- Barred honeyeater (Gliciphila undulata)

Scientific classification
- Kingdom: Animalia
- Phylum: Chordata
- Class: Aves
- Order: Passeriformes
- Family: Meliphagidae
- Genus: Gliciphila; Swainson, 1837

Type species
- Certhia fulvifrons Lewin, 1808=Certhia melanops Latham, 1801

Synonyms
- Glycifohia Mathews, 1929

= Gliciphila =

Genus of birds

Gliciphila is a genus of honeyeaters endemic to Australia, New Caledonia and Vanuatu.

== Taxonomy ==
The genus Gliciphila was introduced in 1837 by the English zoologist William Swainson to accommodate a single species, Certhia fulvifrons Lewin, 1808. This is the type species. The name is a junior synonym of Certhia melanops Latham, 1801, the tawny-crowned honeyeater. The genus name combines the Ancient Greek γλυκυς/glukus meaning "sweet" or "sweet tasting" with φιλος/philos meaning "lover".

Molecular genetic studies found that the tawny-crowned honeyeater in the genus Gliciphila was embedded in a clade containing the two species in the genus Glycifohia. To resolve the polyphyly the three species are now placed together in Gliciphila.

The genus contains three species:

Image	Common name	Scientific name	Distribution
	Barred honeyeater	Gliciphila undulata	montane forest of New Caledonia
	Tawny-crowned honeyeater	Gliciphila melanops	south Australia and Tasmania
	White-bellied honeyeater	Gliciphila notabilis	Vanuatu
