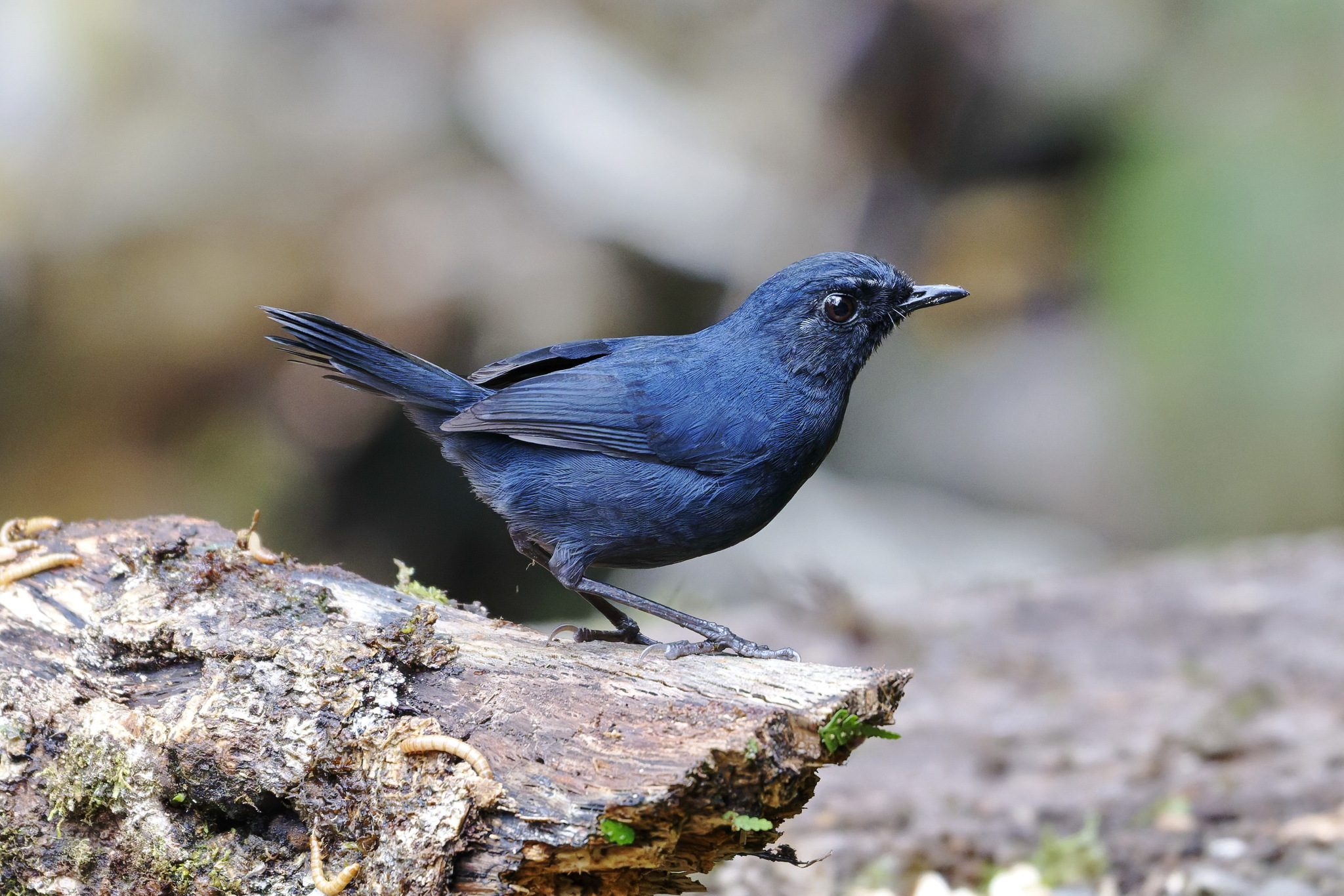
- Male
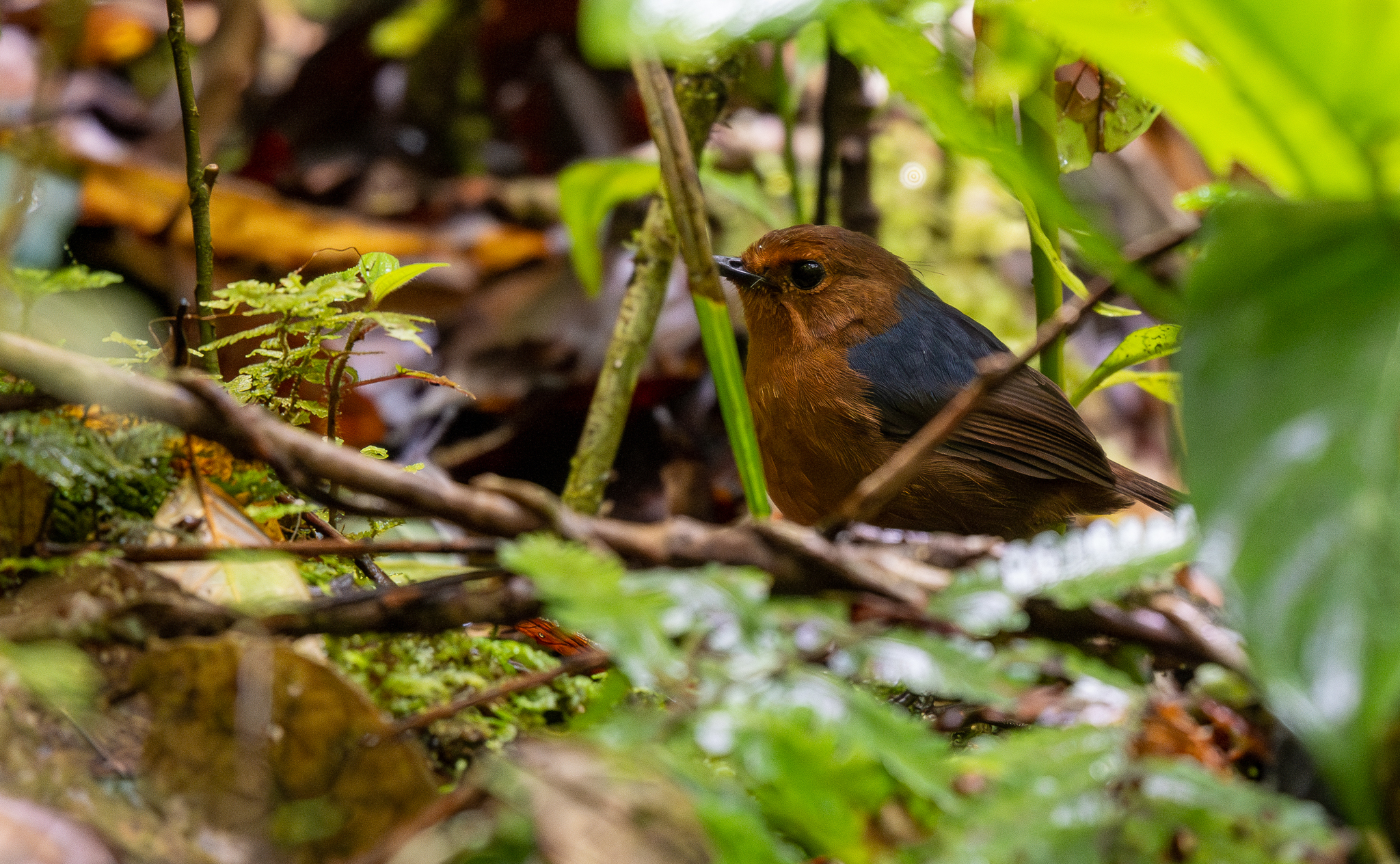
- Female

Conservation status
- Least Concern (IUCN 3.1)

Scientific classification
- Kingdom: Animalia
- Phylum: Chordata
- Class: Aves
- Order: Passeriformes
- Family: Muscicapidae
- Genus: Brachypteryx
- Species: B. erythrogyna

Binomial name
- Brachypteryx erythrogyna Sharpe, 1888

= Bornean shortwing =

Species of bird

The Bornean shortwing (Brachypteryx erythrogyna) is a species of bird in the Old World flycatcher family Muscicapidae. It is endemic to Borneo where it favours montane forest.

This species was formerly considered as a subspecies of the white-browed shortwing, now the Javan shortwing (Brachypteryx montana). The white-browed shortwing was split into five separate species based on the deep genetic difference between the populations coupled with the significant differences in plumage and vocalization.
