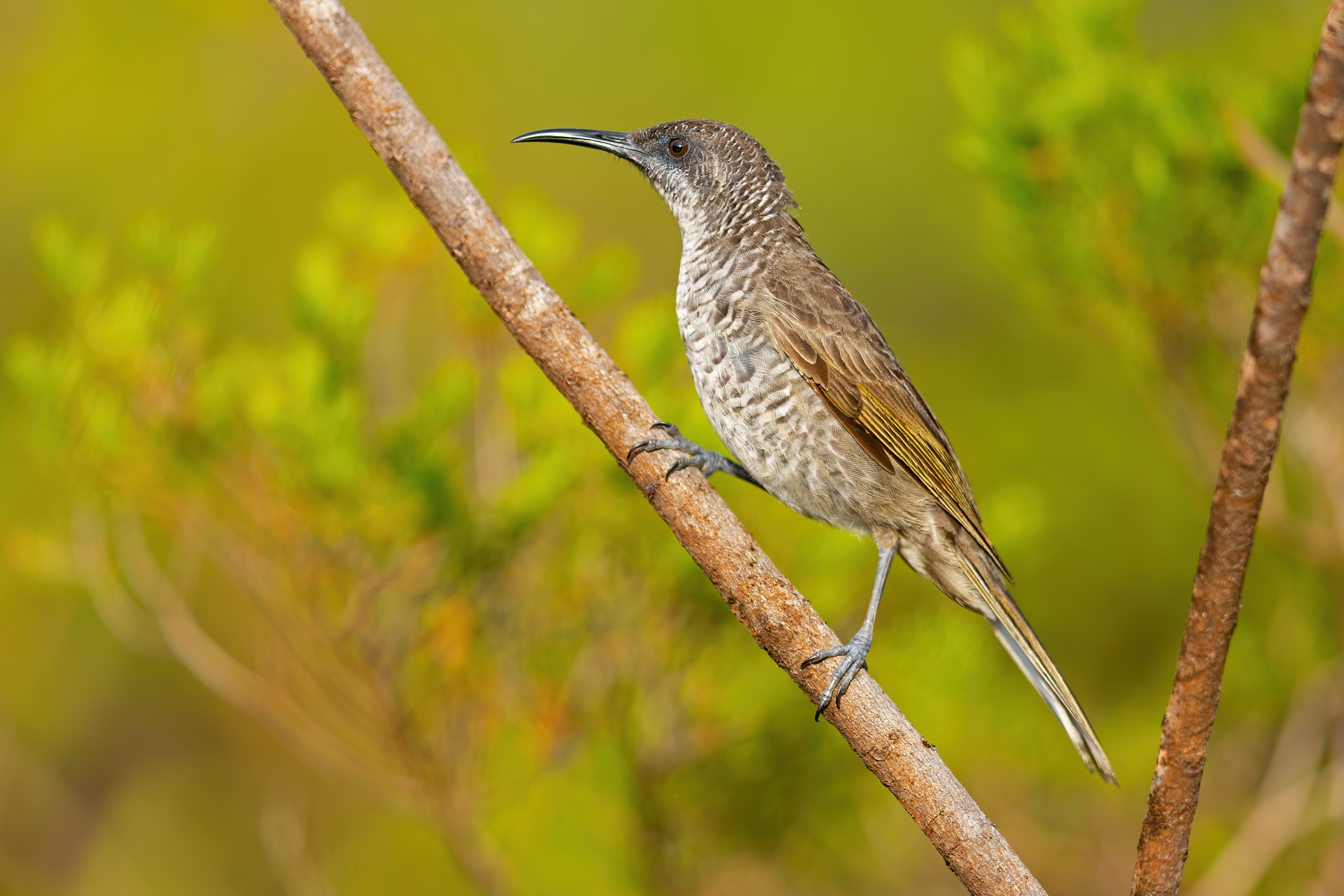

Conservation status
- Least Concern (IUCN 3.1)

Scientific classification
- Kingdom: Animalia
- Phylum: Chordata
- Class: Aves
- Order: Passeriformes
- Family: Meliphagidae
- Genus: Gliciphila
- Species: G. undulata

Binomial name
- Gliciphila undulata (Sparrman, 1787)

Synonyms
- Certhia fusca; Certhia undulata; Glycifohia undulata; Guadalcanaria undulata; Phylidonyris undulata; Phylidonyris undulatus

= Barred honeyeater =

Species of bird

The barred honeyeater (Gliciphila undulata) is a species of bird in the family Meliphagidae. It is endemic to New Caledonia. This species was formerly placed in the genus Glycifohia.
