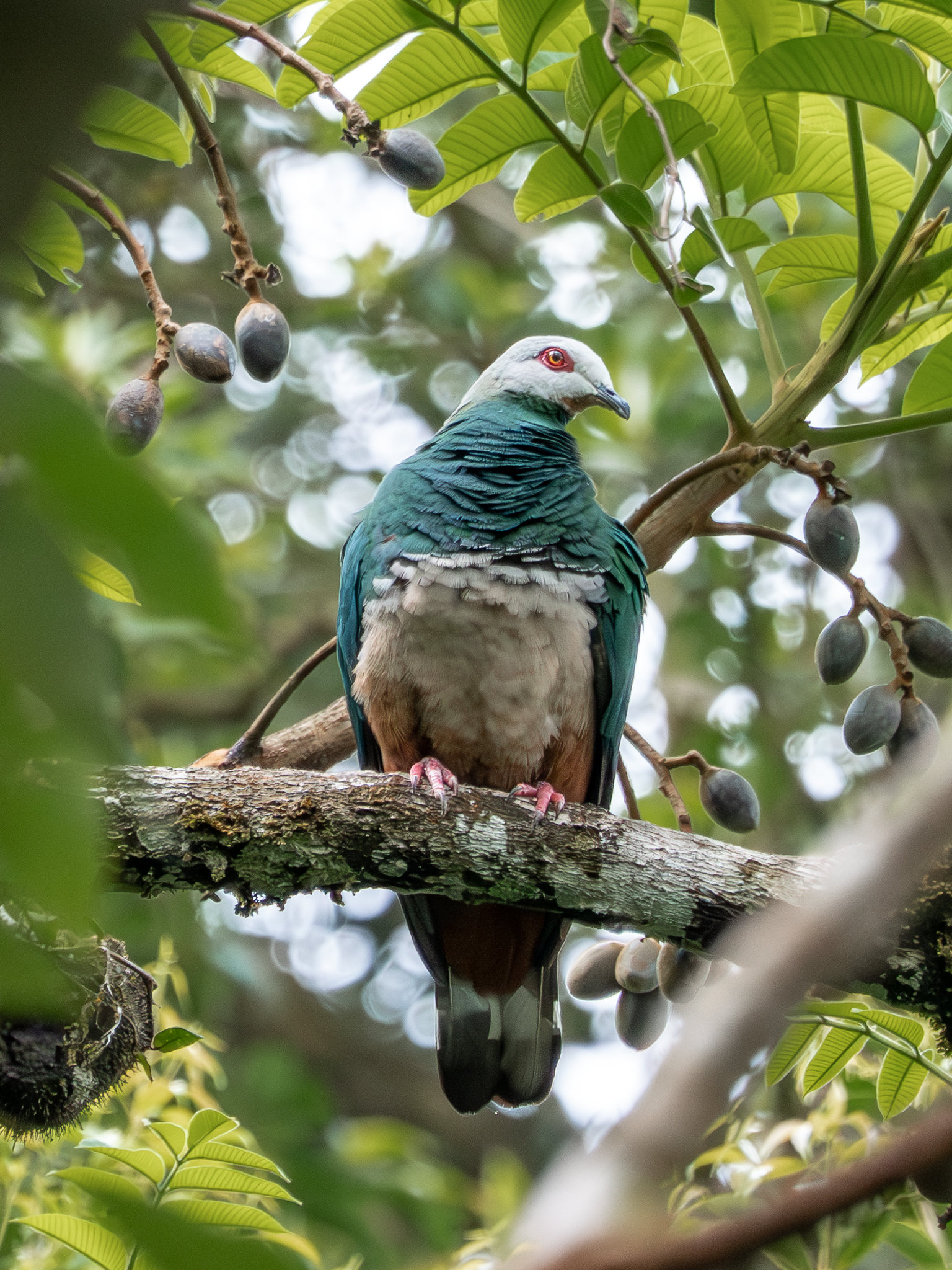

Conservation status
- Near Threatened (IUCN 3.1)

Scientific classification
- Kingdom: Animalia
- Phylum: Chordata
- Class: Aves
- Order: Columbiformes
- Family: Columbidae
- Genus: Ducula
- Species: D. poliocephala

Binomial name
- Ducula poliocephala (Gray, 1844)

= Pink-bellied imperial pigeon =

Species of bird

The pink-bellied imperial pigeon (Ducula poliocephala), also known as the zone-tailed pigeon, is found in the Philippines. It is a large and striking dove reaching sizes of up to 42cm long. The pink-bellied imperial pigeon is mostly dark green, with a pale gray head, an appropriately pink belly, and a brown, black, and gray pattern on its tail. Its eyes and eye ceres are red. Its natural habitat is tropical moist lowland forest. It is threatened by habitat loss.

It is illegal to hunt, capture or possess these birds under Philippine Law RA 9147.

== Description and taxonomy ==
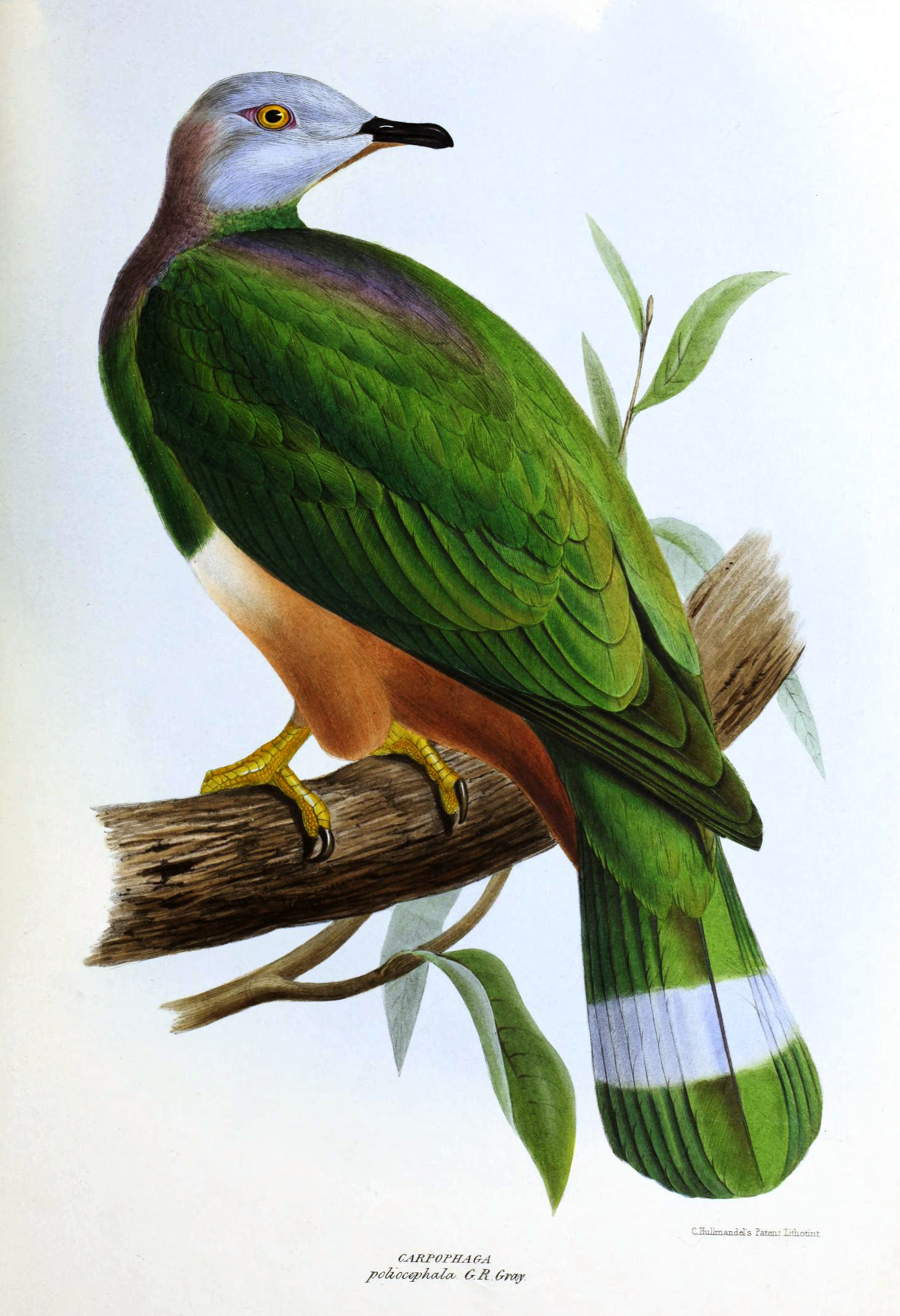
An illustration.

"A large pigeon of foothill and lower montane forest canopy with a white head, a dark bluish-gray chest and upper back, green wings, a whitish belly with a pink tinge, and rufous under the base of the tail. Note the large red eye-ring. Somewhat similar to Mindoro imperial pigeon, but the pink-bellied has a dark neck and chest. Song is a deep, booming, upslurred "doo-dup! doo-dup!"which can be heard from a distance." It is believed that these birds are strong fliers and are capable of flying inter island.This species is monotypic but recent studies have suggested that the population on the Tawi-tawi be split into a separate species named Ducula tawitawi. This proposed species is similar to the Pink-bellied imperial but lacks a brown chin and has a slightly shorter call.

== Ecology and behavior ==
It is a frugivore. Usually occurs singly or in small groups even with other doves such as Mindoro imperial pigeon, Metallic pigeon, Spotted imperial pigeon and Green imperial pigeon. Its flight is fast and direct, with the regular beats and an occasional sharp flick of the wings that are characteristic of pigeons in general.

Nothing is known about its breeding habits.

== Habitat and Conservation Status ==
Its natural habitat is tropical moist lowland forest and montane forest up to 1,500 m. According to the IUCN Red List and BirdLife International's Red Book, the pink-bellied imperial pigeon is classified as Near-threatened. However, The National List of Threatened Terrestrial Fauna of the Philippines has classified it as Critically Endangered.

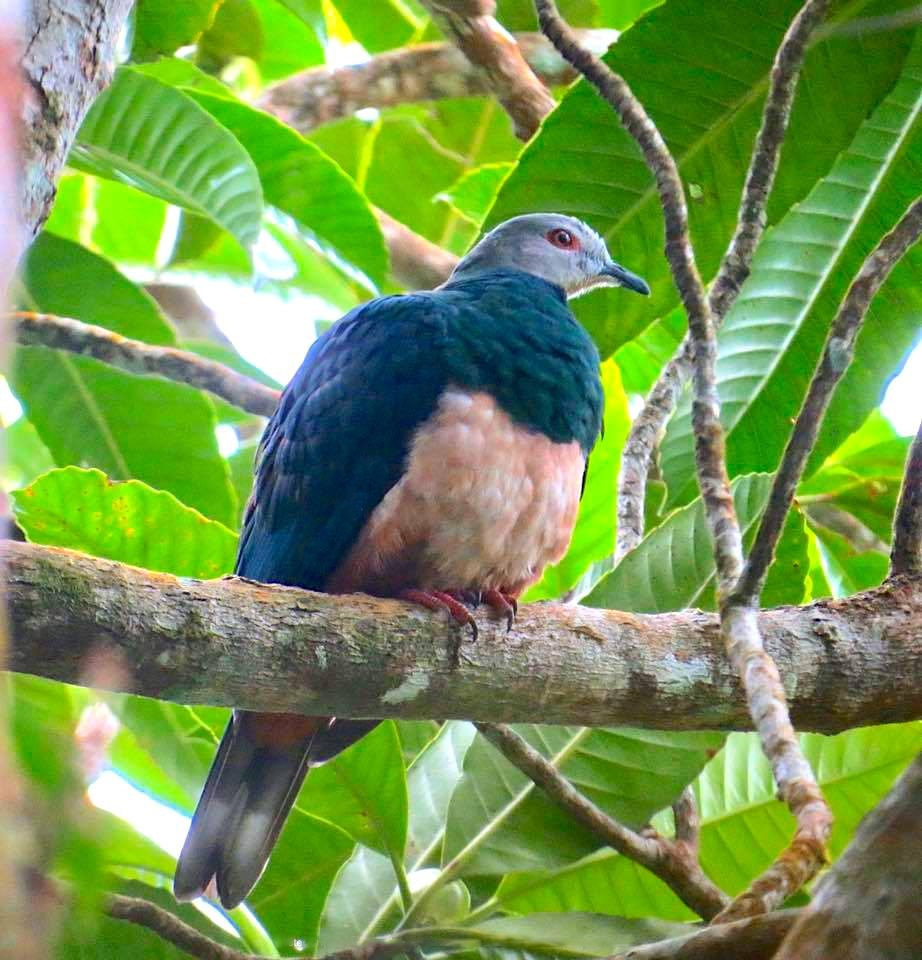

This is due to the loss of habitat, trapping for the pet trade and hunting for food. Although it occurs quite widely within the Philippines, this species is scarce and probably has a moderately small population, which is suspected to be in moderately rapid decline owing to hunting and the removal of its favoured lowland forest habitat. This bird is extremely rare in Luzon but frequently more commonly observed in Negros Island, Mindoro, Samar and Mindanao. It was believed locally extinct on Cebu but there have been multiple reports in Alcoy since 2003. This species has been bred in captivity by Talarak Foundation in Negros.

If the proposed split of the Tawi-tawi population is indeed split, that subpopulation is likely extremely endangered given the amound of deforestation in the area and the possible extinction of the Sulu bleeding-heart and the near extinction of other forest reliant species like the Sulu hornbill and Blue-winged racket-tail.

This species is extremely poorly known and more surveys are required to better understand its biology, population and true conservation status.

Under the Philippine law RA9147, it is completely illegal to hunt these birds or to capture and keep them as pets. As it is crically endangered species on the Philippine Red List, any violations have harsher punishments including "imprisonment of four (4) years and one (1) day to six (6) years and/or a fine of Fifty thousand pesos (P50,000.00) to Five hundred thousand pesos (P500,000.00), if inflicted or undertaken against endangered species;"
