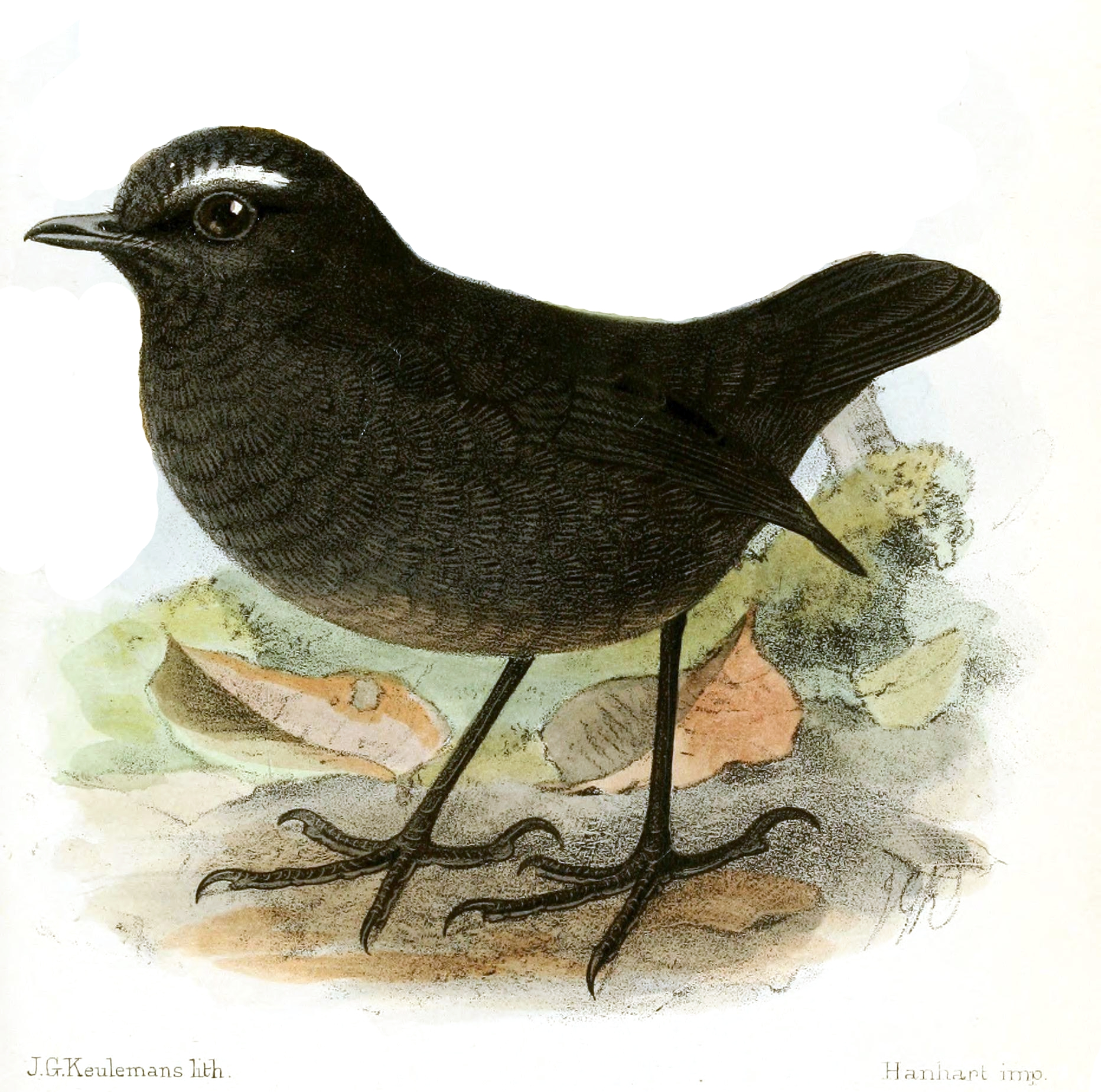
- Lithograph by John Gerrard Keulemans published in 1883
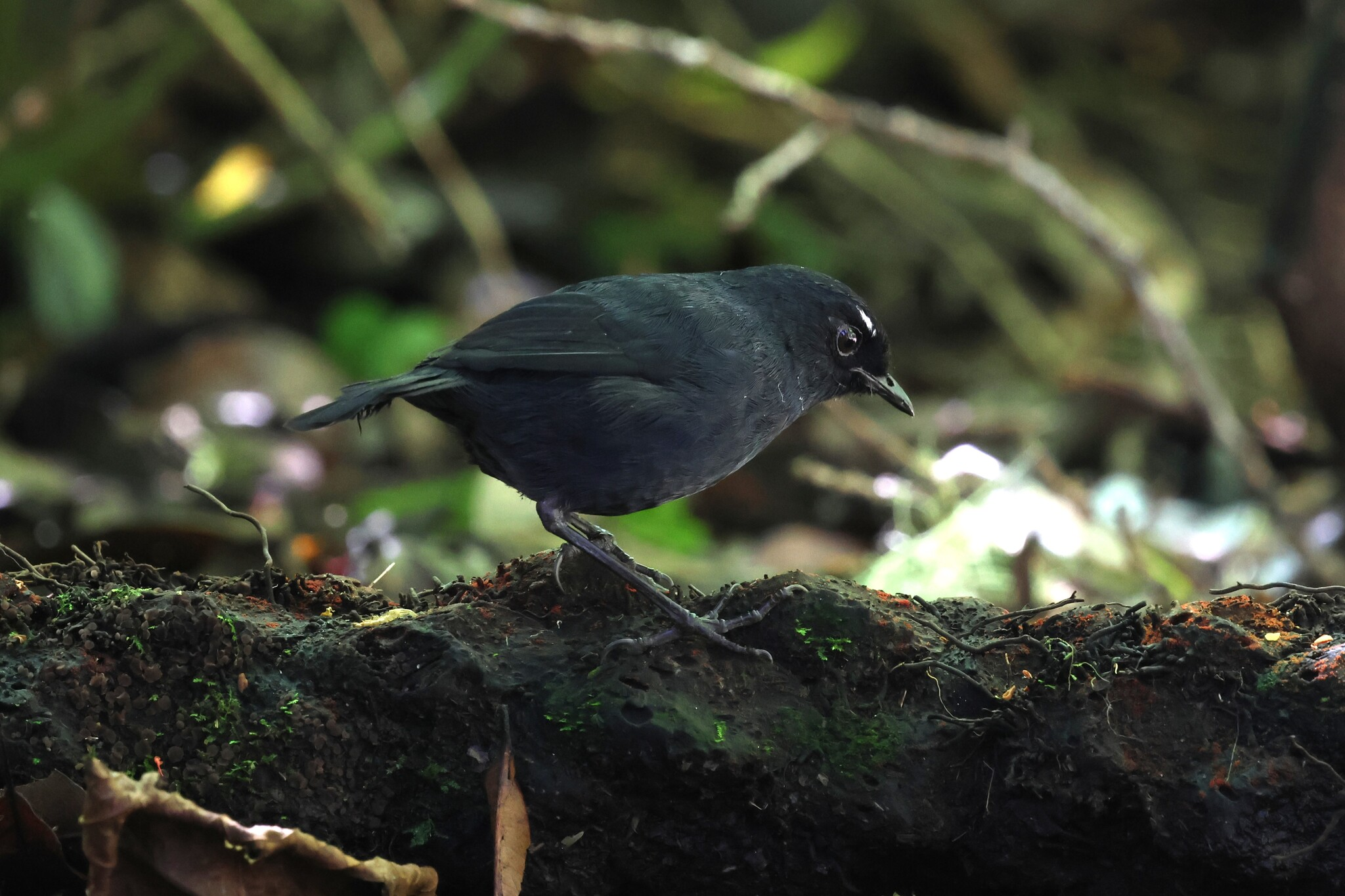

Conservation status
- Least Concern (IUCN 3.1)

Scientific classification
- Kingdom: Animalia
- Phylum: Chordata
- Class: Aves
- Order: Passeriformes
- Family: Muscicapidae
- Genus: Brachypteryx
- Species: B. saturata

Binomial name
- Brachypteryx saturata Salvadori, 1879

= Sumatran shortwing =

Species of bird

The Sumatran shortwing (Brachypteryx saturata) is a species of bird in the Old World flycatcher family Muscicapidae. It is endemic to the island of Sumatra in western Indonesia where it favours montane forest.

This species was formerly considered as a subspecies of the white-browed shortwing, now the Javan shortwing (Brachypteryx montana). The white-browed shortwing was split into five separate species based on the deep genetic difference between the populations coupled with the significant differences in plumage and vocalization.
