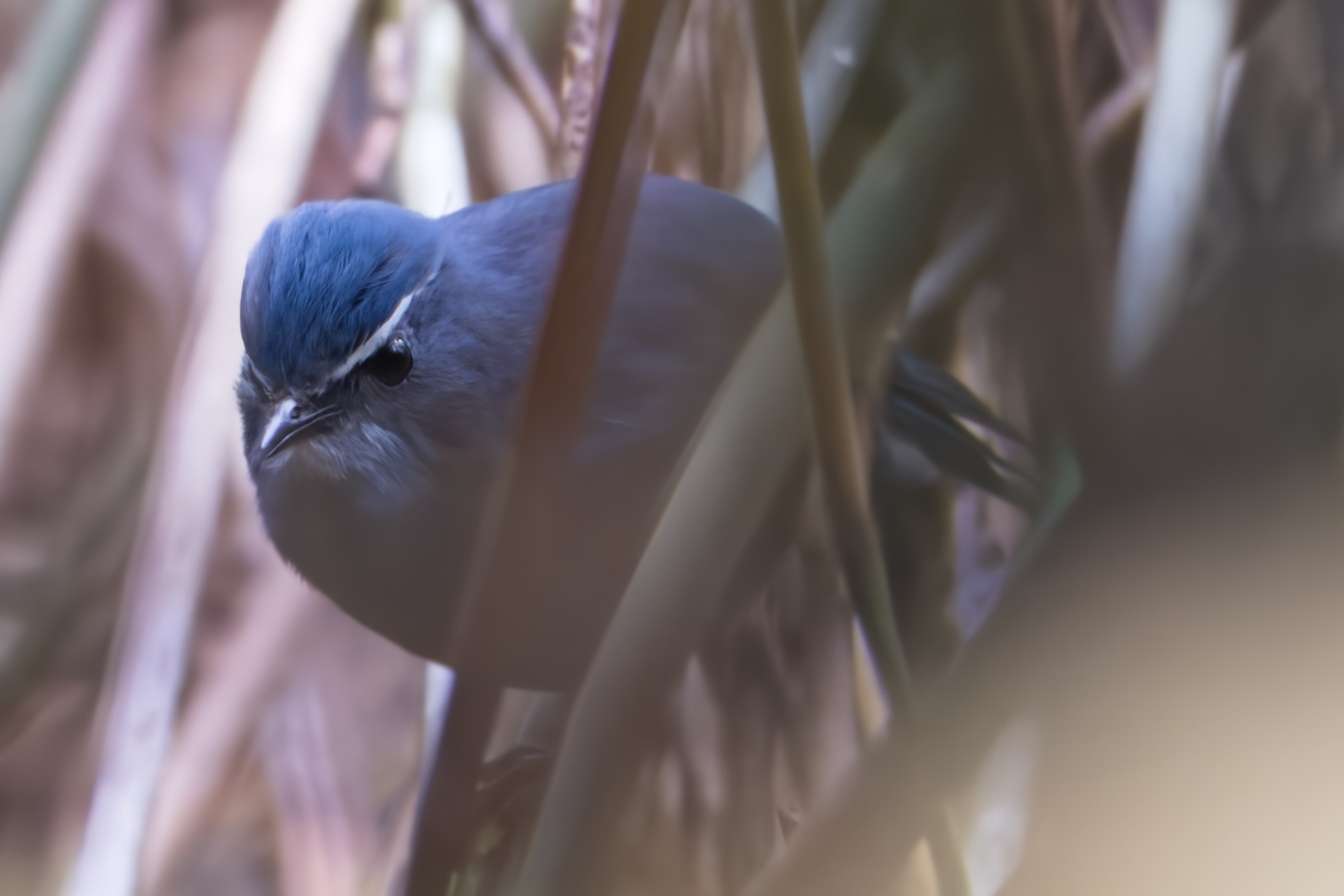
- Male in Yichang, Hubei Province, China

Conservation status
- Least Concern (IUCN 3.1)

Scientific classification
- Kingdom: Animalia
- Phylum: Chordata
- Class: Aves
- Order: Passeriformes
- Family: Muscicapidae
- Genus: Brachypteryx
- Species: B. sinensis

Binomial name
- Brachypteryx sinensis Rickett, 1897

= Chinese shortwing =

Species of bird

The Chinese shortwing (Brachypteryx sinensis) is a species of chat. This species is now classified in the family Muscicapidae.

It is found in southern China. Its natural habitat is subtropical or tropical moist montane forests. It is a shy skulker, preferring to be on or near the ground, in the depths of dark vegetation, where it feeds on small insects, larvae, berries, seeds, sprouts and new buds of plants. The nest consists of moss and grass stems, placed in a dense shrub.
