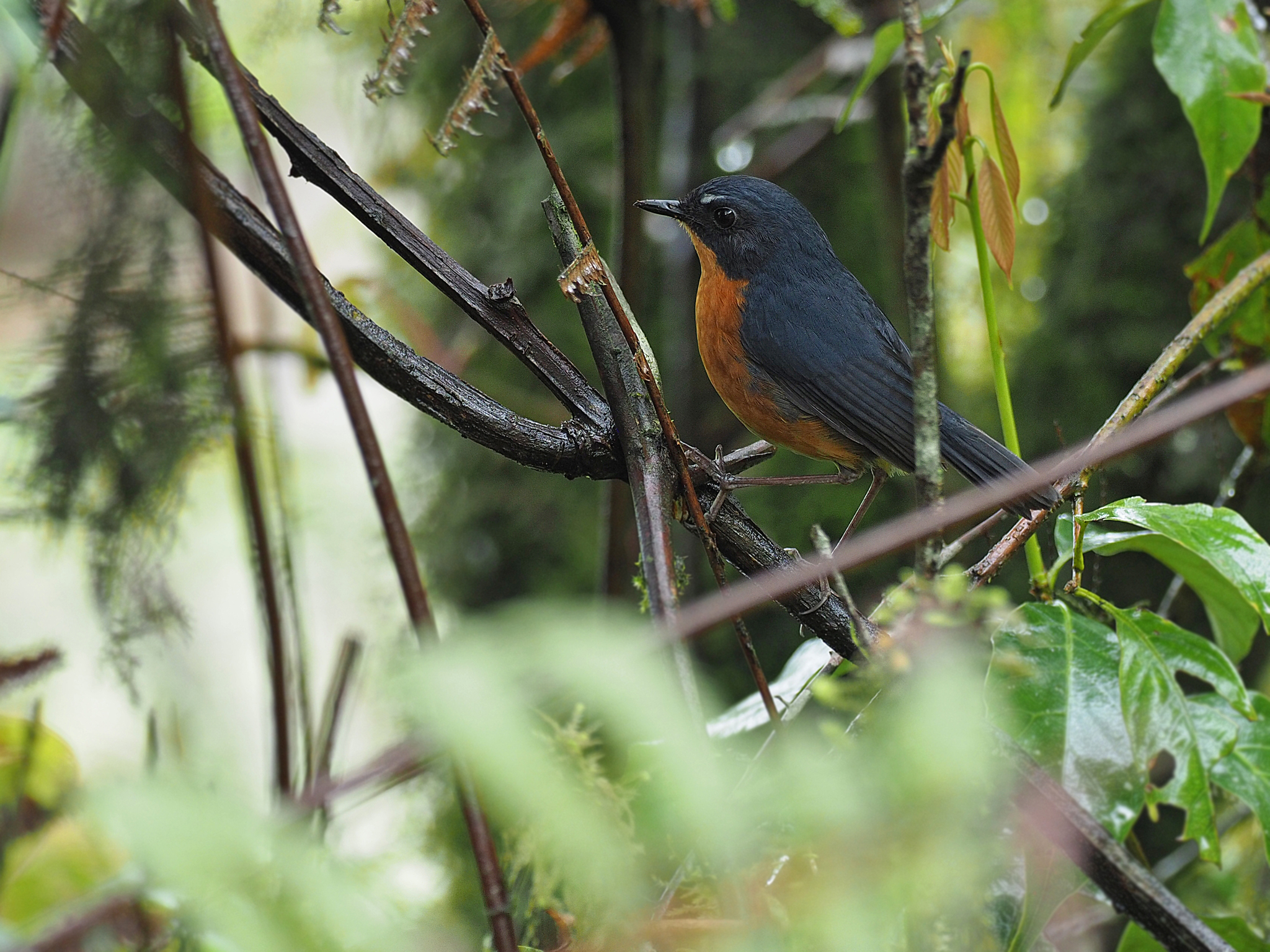

Conservation status
- Near Threatened (IUCN 3.1)

Scientific classification
- Kingdom: Animalia
- Phylum: Chordata
- Class: Aves
- Order: Passeriformes
- Family: Muscicapidae
- Genus: Brachypteryx
- Species: B. hyperythra

Binomial name
- Brachypteryx hyperythra Blyth, 1861

= Rusty-bellied shortwing =

Species of bird

The rusty-bellied shortwing (Brachypteryx hyperythra) is a species of bird in the family Muscicapidae. It is found in Yunnan, Northeast India and far northern Myanmar.

Its natural habitats are subtropical or tropical moist lowland forests, subtropical or tropical moist montane forests, and subtropical or tropical moist shrubland. It is affected by habitat loss. Having turned out to be more common than previously believed, it is downlisted from Vulnerable to Near Threatened in the 2007 IUCN Red List.
