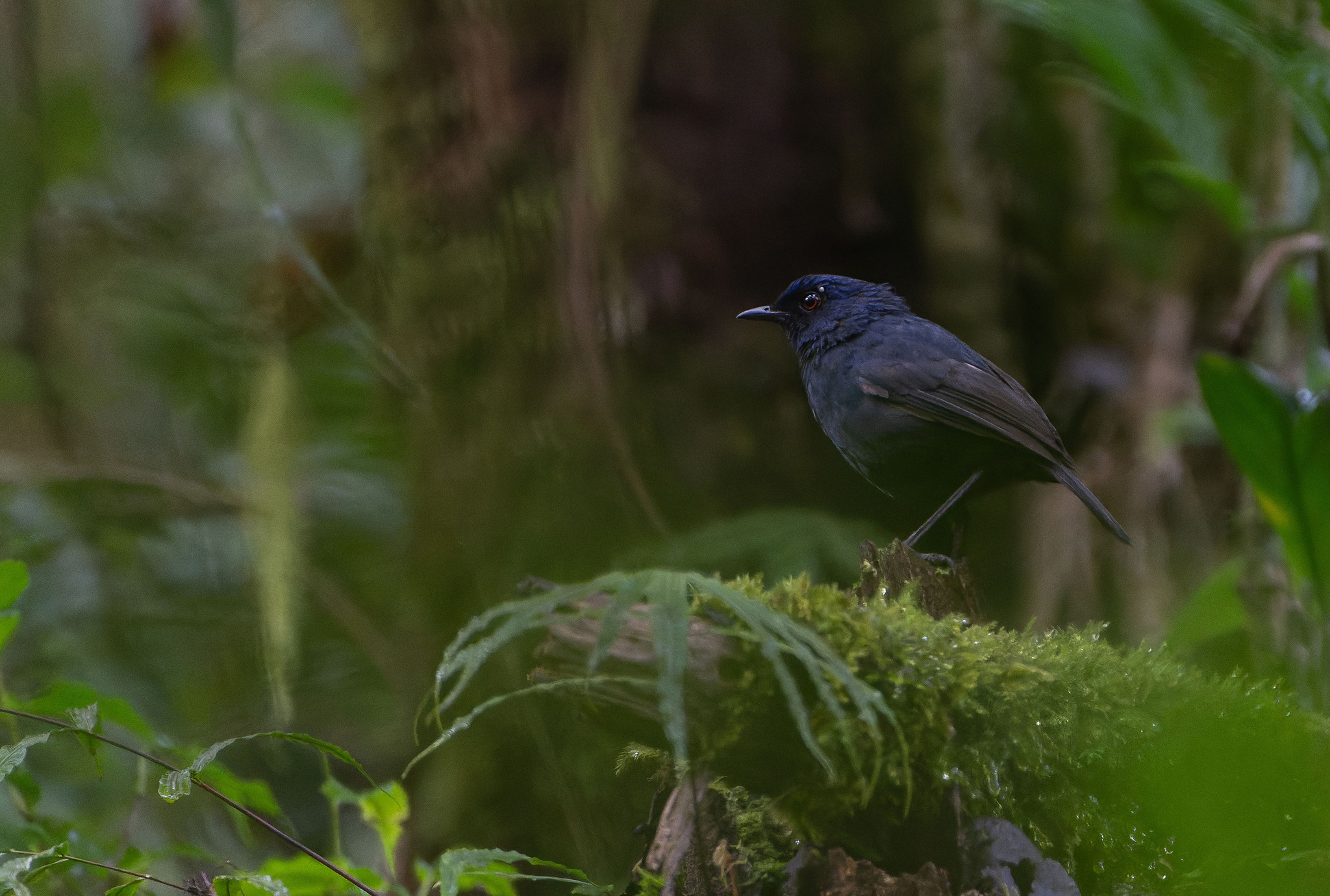

Conservation status
- Least Concern (IUCN 3.1)

Scientific classification
- Kingdom: Animalia
- Phylum: Chordata
- Class: Aves
- Order: Passeriformes
- Family: Muscicapidae
- Genus: Heinrichia; Stresemann, 1931
- Species: H. calligyna

Binomial name
- Heinrichia calligyna Stresemann, 1931

= Great shortwing =

Species of bird

The great shortwing (Heinrichia calligyna) is a species of bird in the family Muscicapidae, and the only member of its genus. Other common names include giant shortwing, Celebes shortwing and Sulawesi shortwing. It is endemic to Sulawesi in Indonesia where its natural habitat is tropical moist montane forests.

== Description ==
The great shortwing is a stocky bird with short rounded wings, growing to a length of about 17.5 cm (7 in). In general size and shape it resembles a European robin (Erithacus rubecula). The male is almost entirely very dark blue apart from a small patch of white at either side of the base of the tail. The female is a similar blue colour but has a white spot in front of the eye and a reddish-brown rump. It has a reddish-brown sheen to the throat and upper breast, and greyish-blue underparts. Both sexes have red irises, black beaks and greyish legs.

== Distribution ==
The great shortwing is endemic to the island of Sulawesi in Indonesia where it occurs at altitudes between 1,500 and 3,500 m (4,900 and 11,500 ft). Three subspecies are recognised. H. c. simplex from northern Sulawesi, H. c. calligyna from south-central Sulawesi, and H. c. picta from southeastern Sulawesi.

== Ecology ==
The great shortwing is a shy and secretive bird which lurks in dense foliage, tangled thickets, vines, deep gullies and streamside vegetation. It can sometimes be heard singing in the early morning from dense cover, often with two birds singing in duet. The song is a high-pitched, wavering series of whistles that increase in pitch and volume, the phrase being repeated, over and over again, for up to a minute. The bird feeds on the ground, foraging through the leaf litter, mosses and lichens, presumably feeding on insects, grubs and other small invertebrates. The nesting habits are unknown, but a juvenile was observed in Lore Lindu National Park in September 2016.

== Status ==
Little is known of the conservation status of the great shortwing but the bird is suspected of declining in numbers because of the destruction of its habitat and the introduction of feral predators. Its area of occurrence is estimated to be about 13,000 km^{2} (5,000 mi^{2}). It is an uncommon species in the lower part of its range but rather more common in the upper part. The International Union for Conservation of Nature has assessed its conservation status as being of "least concern".

In March of 2026, the Minahasa shortwing (H. c. simplex) was added to a list made by Search for Lost Birds, an organization aimed at rediscovering bird species not seen in the last 10 years or more, along with the Mindoro bleeding-heart (Last seen in 2005), Samoan white-eye, Vanikoro white-eye, Mindoro imperial pigeon, and the Guadalcanal honeyeater.
