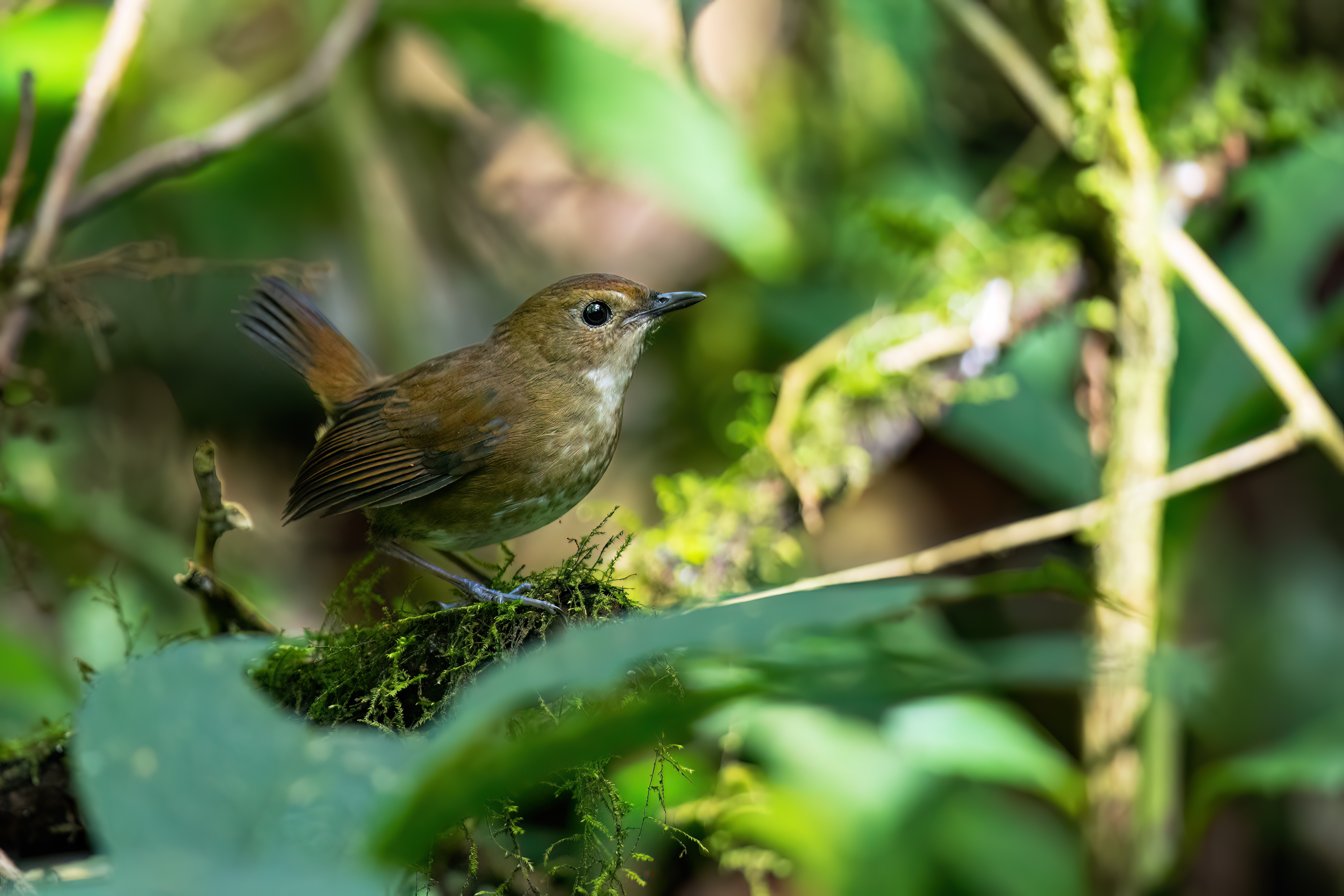

Conservation status
- Least Concern (IUCN 3.1)

Scientific classification
- Kingdom: Animalia
- Phylum: Chordata
- Class: Aves
- Order: Passeriformes
- Family: Muscicapidae
- Genus: Brachypteryx
- Species: B. leucophris

Binomial name
- Brachypteryx leucophris (Temminck, 1828)

= Lesser shortwing =

Species of bird

The lesser shortwing (Brachypteryx leucophris) is a species of chat. This species is now classified in the family Muscicapidae.

It is found in south-eastern Asia, Sumatra, Java and the Lesser Sundas. Its natural habitat is subtropical or tropical moist montane forests.

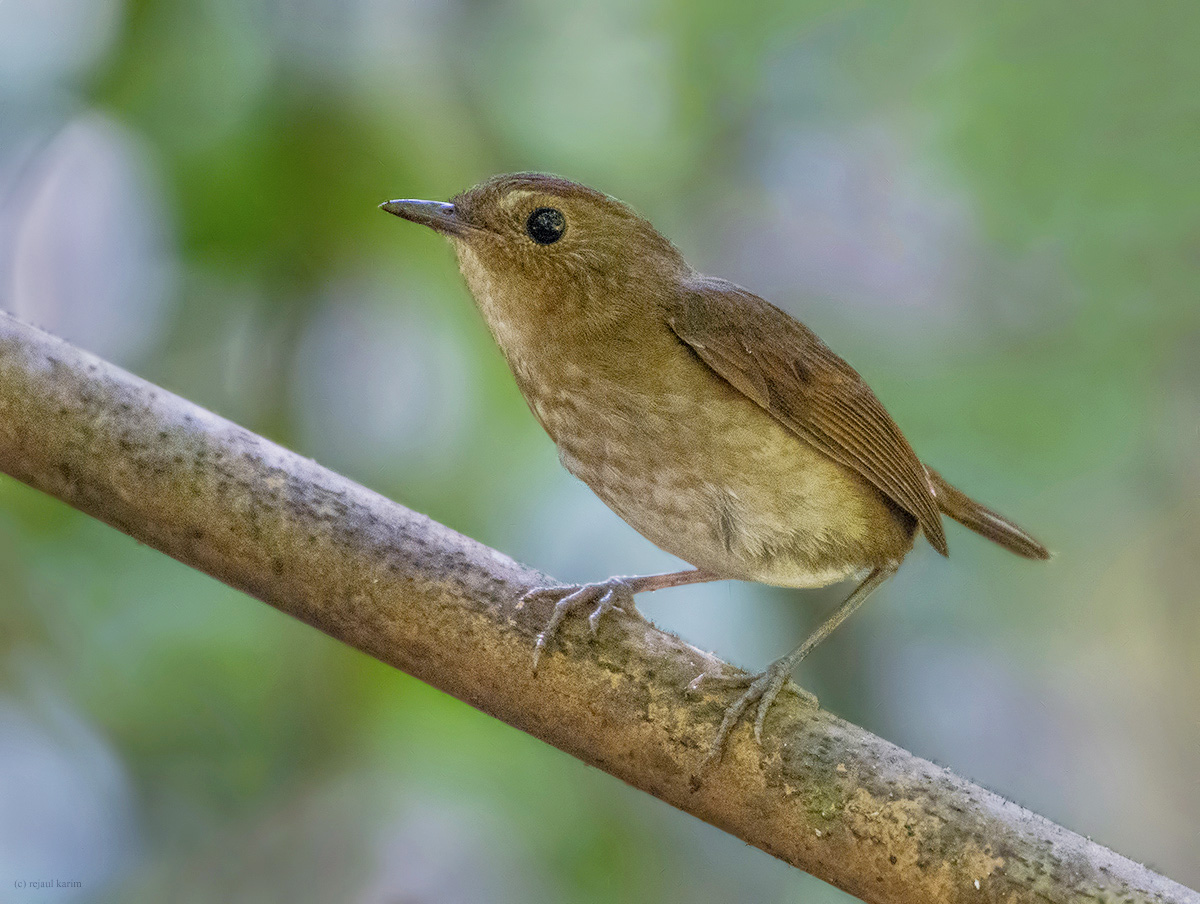
Lesser Shortwing (Brachypteryx leucophris carolinae)
