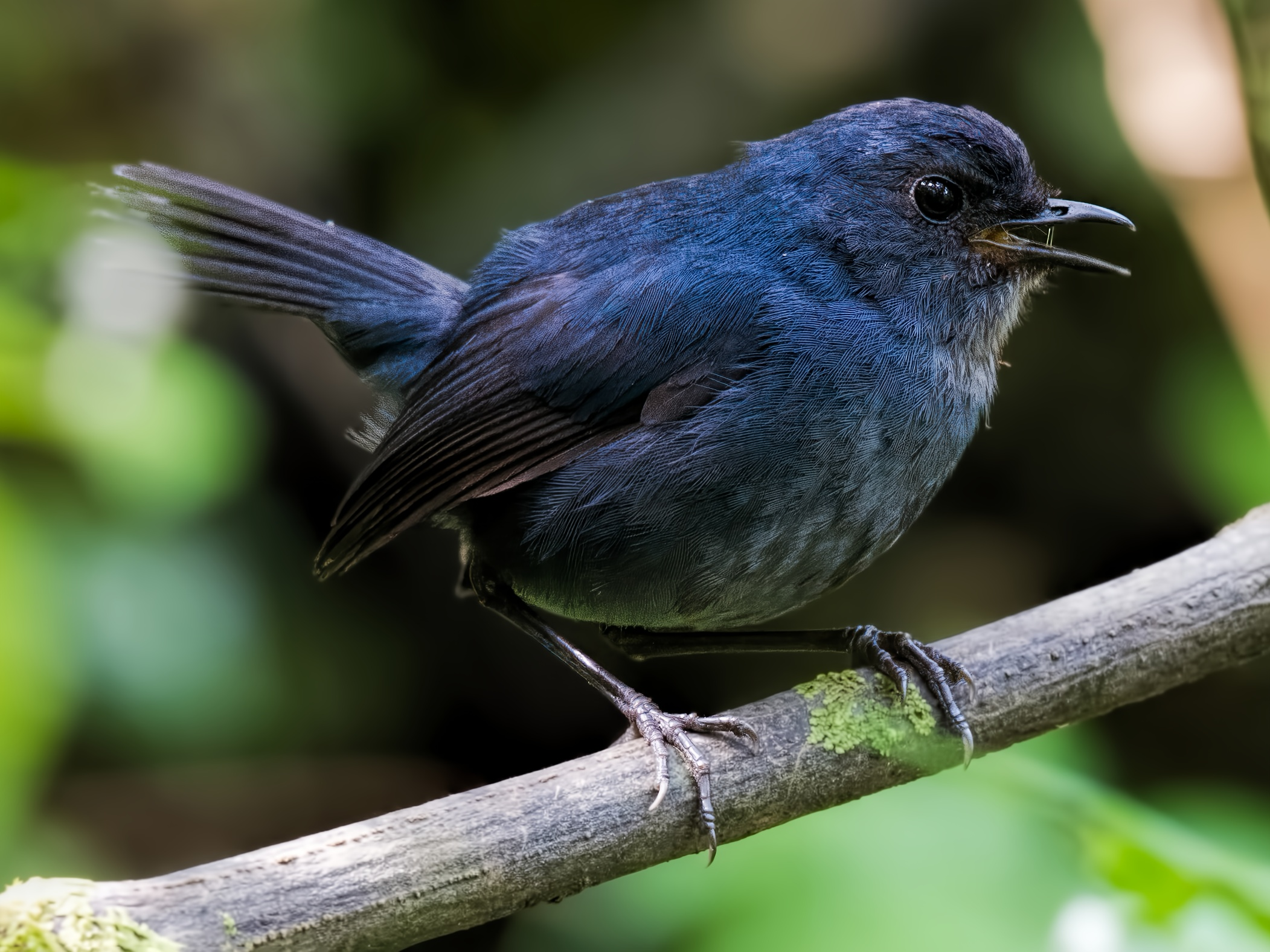
- in Jawa Barat, Jawa, Indonesia

Conservation status
- Least Concern (IUCN 3.1)

Scientific classification
- Kingdom: Animalia
- Phylum: Chordata
- Class: Aves
- Order: Passeriformes
- Family: Muscicapidae
- Genus: Brachypteryx
- Species: B. montana

Binomial name
- Brachypteryx montana Horsfield, 1821

= Javan shortwing =

Species of bird

The Javan shortwing (Brachypteryx montana) (formerly the white-browed shortwing) is a species of bird that is placed in the Old World flycatcher family Muscicapidae. It is endemic to the island of Java where it favours montane forests.

== Taxonomy ==
The Javan shortwing was formally described in 1821 by the America naturalist Thomas Horsfield. He coined the present binomial name Brachypteryx montana.

This species was formerly named the white-browed shortwing and included many subspecies. It was split into five separate species based on the deep genetic difference between the populations coupled with the significant differences in plumage and vocalization. The new species are the Philippine shortwing (Brachypteryx poliogyna), the Bornean shortwing (Brachypteryx erythrogyna), the Sumatran shortwing (Brachypteryx saturata) and the Flores shortwing (Brachypteryx floris). The white-browed shortwing with its much reduced range was renamed the Javan shortwing. The species is now monotypic: no subspecies are recognised.

== Description ==
The Javan shortwing is a shy skulker, preferring to be on or near the ground, in the depths of dark vegetation, where it feeds on small insects, larvae, berries, seeds, sprouts and new buds of plants. The nest consists of moss and grass stems, placed in a dense shrub.
