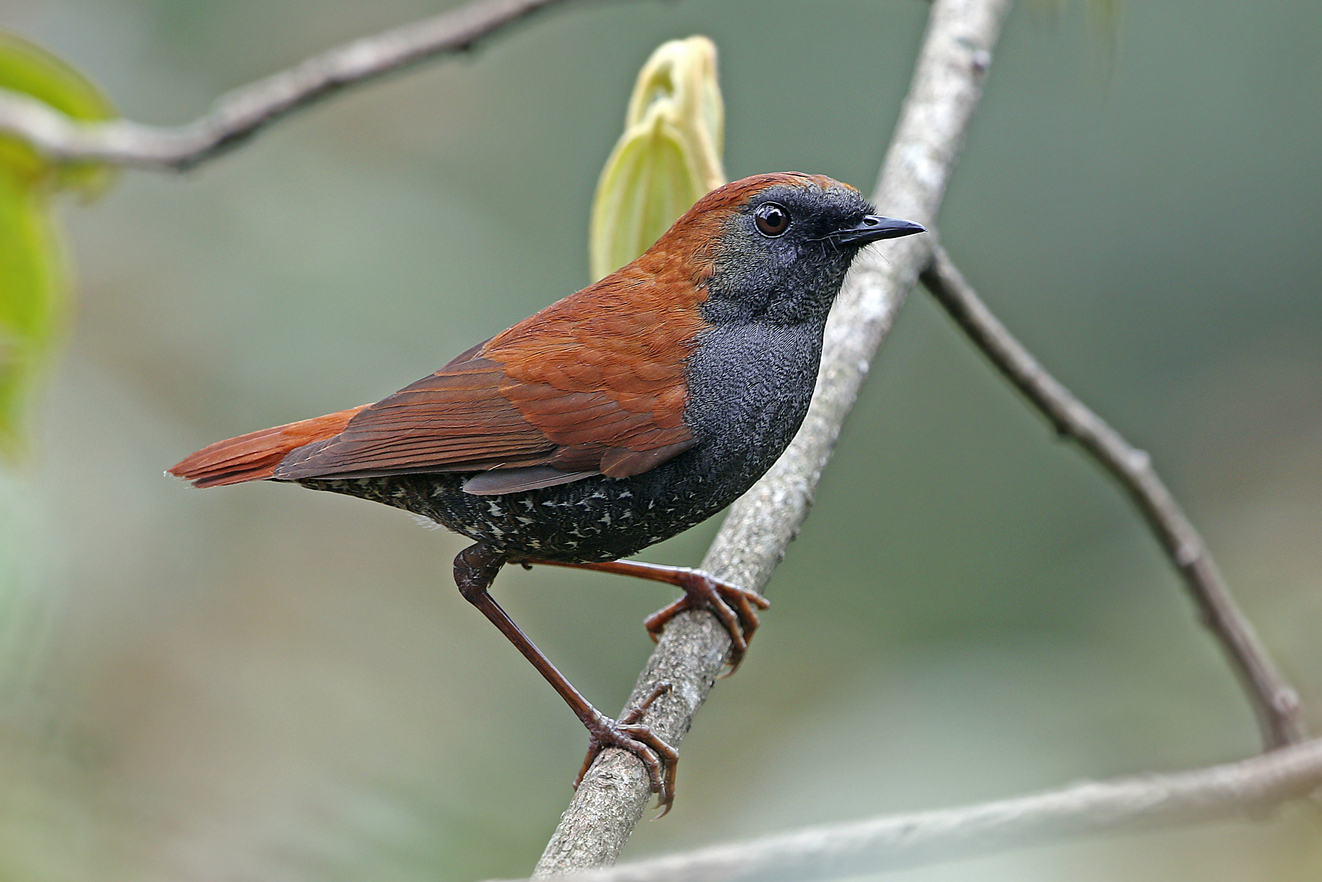

Conservation status
- Least Concern (IUCN 3.1)

Scientific classification
- Kingdom: Animalia
- Phylum: Chordata
- Class: Aves
- Order: Passeriformes
- Family: Muscicapidae
- Genus: Heteroxenicus; Sharpe, 1902
- Species: H. stellatus

Binomial name
- Heteroxenicus stellatus (Gould, 1868)

Synonyms
- Brachypteryx stellatus

= Gould's shortwing =

Species of bird

Gould's shortwing (Heteroxenicus stellatus) is a small species of passerine bird in the family Muscicapidae. It is found in the Himalayas (mainly Uttarakhand, Sikkim and Bhutan), Yunnan and northern parts of Myanmar and Vietnam. It breeds in the eastern Himalayas in rocky areas above the tree-line and winters at lower altitude in wooded valleys.

Gould's shortwing is the only species in the genus Heteroxenicus. It was formerly placed in the genus Brachypteryx.

The common name commemorates the English ornithologist and bird artist John Gould (1804-1881).

== Taxonomy ==
The first formal description of Gould's shortwing was by the English ornithologist and bird artist John Gould in 1868 from a specimen collected in Nepal. He chose the binomial name Brachypteryx stellatus.

Gould's shortwing is the only species in the genus Heteroxenicus. It was formerly placed in the genus Brachypteryx and was assigned to the thrush family Turdidae. The genus Heteroxenicus had been introduced by Richard Bowdler Sharpe in 1902. The genus name Heteroxenicus combines the classical Greek words heteros for "different" and xenikos for "stranger". The specific epithet stellata is from the Latin word stellatus meaning "starry" or "set with stars".

There are two subspecies:

- H. s. stellatus (Gould, 1868) – central Himalayas to south China and northeast Myanmar
- H. s. fuscus (Delacour & Jabouille, 1930) – northwest Vietnam

== Description ==
Gould's shortwing is 12–13 cm (4.7–5.1 in) in length with a weight of 19–23 g (0.67–0.81 oz). It is chestnut coloured above and dark grey below with small white spots or stars on its belly. It has long brown legs and a black bill. The sexes are similar. Nothing is known about the nest or the eggs.
