= Guy Dutson =

Dr Guy Dutson is a British-born veterinarian, ornithologist and a leader of birding tours, who is a world authority on the birds of the south-west Pacific region. He has rediscovered or described several bird species.

== Information ==
Dutson was educated at Cambridge University where he studied veterinary science. As a veterinarian, Dutson worked in the UK, Ethiopia and South Africa. In 1990 he led a Cambridge University expedition to the Solomon Islands and Papua New Guinea, in the course of which he rediscovered the superb pitta on Manus Island. Expeditions to Indonesia and the Philippines led to the rediscovery of the Tanahjampea monarch and the Cebu flowerpecker. In 2003 he rediscovered the long-legged warbler in Fiji. In 2008 he described a new species of white-eye, the Vanikoro white-eye, from the Vanikolo Islands in the Solomons.

From 2000 to 2005, based in Fiji, Dutson established and managed the BirdLife International Pacific program, travelling extensively around the islands of Melanesia and the south-west Pacific. He subsequently worked for Birds Australia as the manager of the Australian Important Bird Areas program. Dutson's most recent publishing endeavour is a description of a high altitude observation of the beautiful firetail in East Gippsland, Australia.

In 2009 he went to survey to search for White-chested white-eye but failed to find any individuals.

== Publications ==
Dutson wrote most of the Pacific islands species' accounts in the BirdLife publication Threatened Birds of the World. He is also involved in editing the same species for the Handbook of the Birds of the World. As well as numerous scientific papers and project reports, he has authored:

- 2002 - Field Guide to Birds of Melanesia. Premier Press. ISBN 978-0-85661-143-8
- 2006 - Important Bird Areas in Fiji: Conserving Fiji's Natural Heritage. BirdLife International. (Edited with Vilikesa T. Masibalavu). ISBN 978-982-9101-01-3
