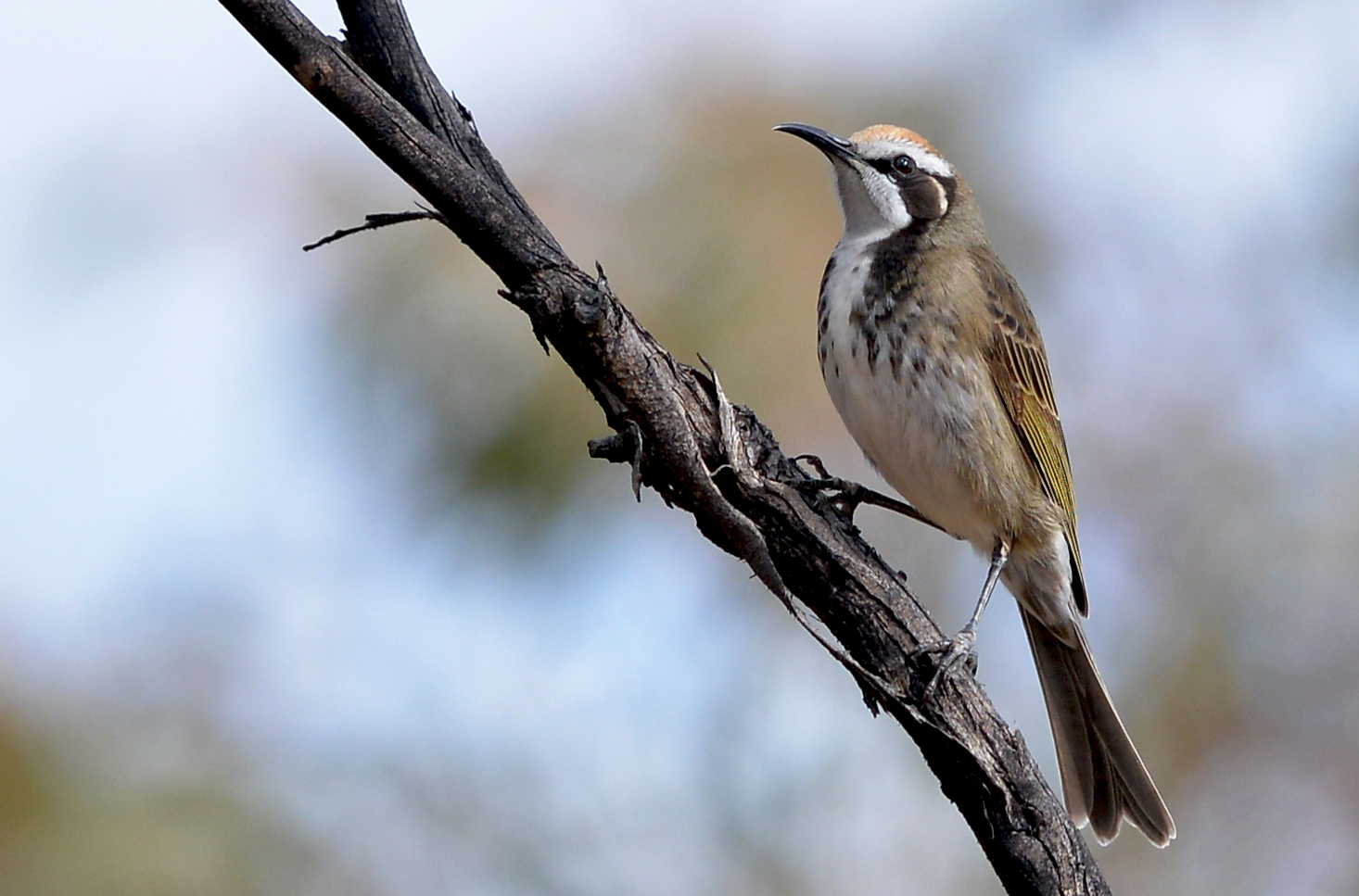

Scientific classification
- Kingdom: Animalia
- Phylum: Chordata
- Class: Aves
- Order: Passeriformes
- Family: Meliphagidae
- Genus: Gliciphila
- Species: G. melanops

Binomial name
- Gliciphila melanops (Latham, 1801)

Synonyms
- Phylidonyris melanops

= Tawny-crowned honeyeater =

Species of bird

The tawny-crowned honeyeater (Gliciphila melanops) is a passerine bird native to southern Australia.

== Taxonomy ==
The tawny-crowned honeyeater was originally described by ornithologist John Latham in 1801 as Certhia melanops. Its specific epithet is derived from the Ancient Greek terms melano- 'black' and ōps 'face'. It was previously classified in the genus Phylidonyris but a molecular study has shown it to be more distantly related to members of that genus. It was assigned to a new genus Gliciphila by Gregory Mathews in 1912.

Two subspecies are recognised:

- G. m. melanops (Latham, J, 1801) – coastal southern Australia (Broadwater, northeastern New South Wales to Wilson's Promontory, western Victoria to Eyre Peninsula, eastern Tasmania, Kalbarri to Nuytsland, southwestern Australia)
- G. m. chelidonia Schodde, R & Mason, IJ, 1999 – western Tasmania

== Description ==
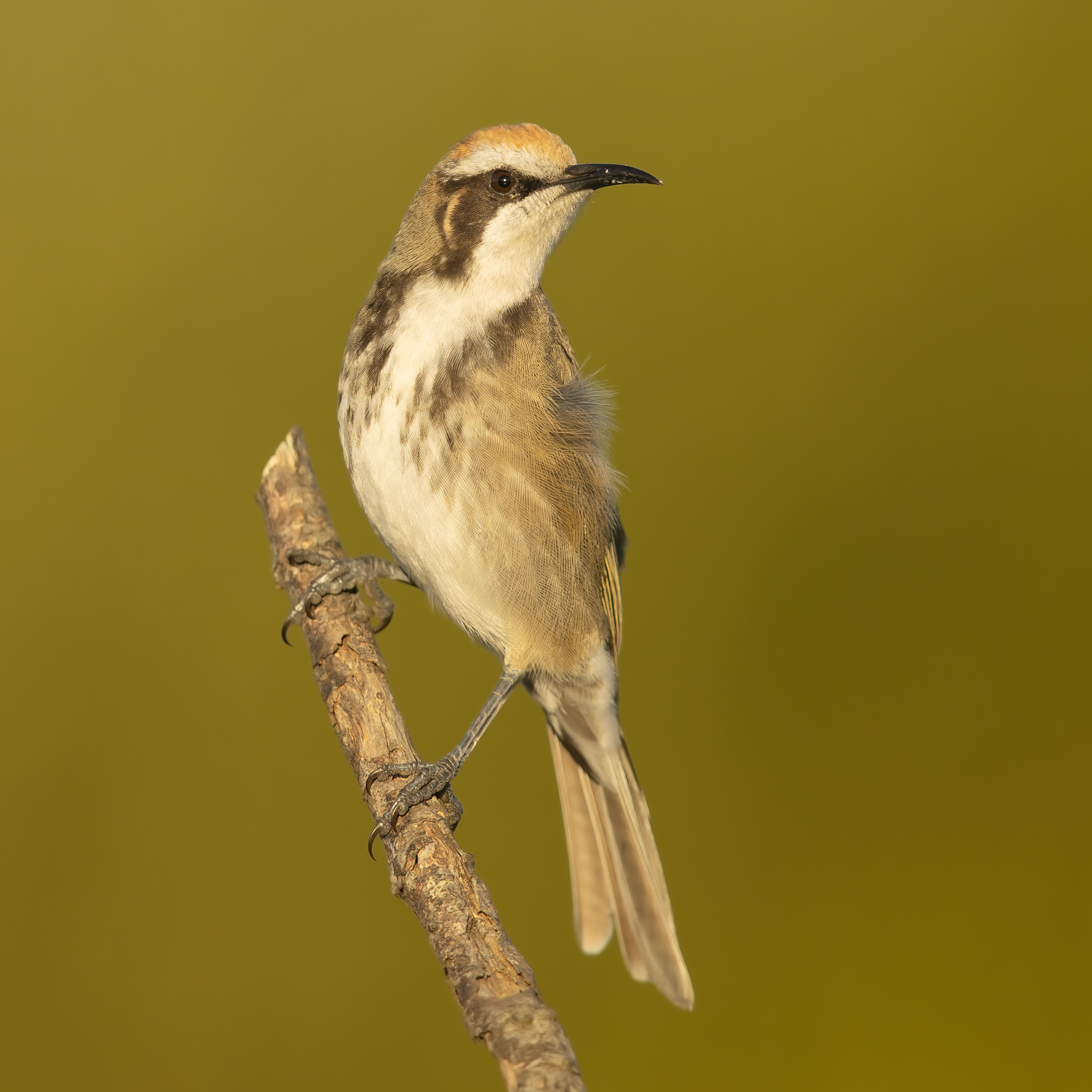
Maddens Plains, NSW

A species of the honeyeater family, perching birds that feed on insects and nectar. Tawny-crowned honeyeaters are sometimes observed hopping amongst plants on the ground to feed, considered as unusual behaviour amongst its near relations. It resembles the eastern and western spinebills and crescent honeyeater, but is distinguished by a tawny-colored crown above a white line separating the black markings of the face. The upper side of the body is a pale brown, becoming white plumage on the lower parts. They possess a long curved bill that is able to reach nectar at the base of flowers, and in some plants they have become the primary pollinator.

The subspecies G. melanops chelidonia, an endemic of Tasmania, has a rufous tinge to its plumage.

== Distribution ==
The tawny-crowned honeyeater is found from the North Coast of New South Wales through to the Eyre Peninsula in South Australia, as well as in Victoria and Tasmania. It also occurs in southwest Western Australia from Israelite Bay westwards. Its natural habitat is low shrubland and heath. It has become locally extinct in the urban Sydney area since 1971.

== Breeding ==
The breeding season may take place from June to December. The bulky cup-shaped nest is made of bark, grass, and even seaweed, and lined with softer material such as fur or wool. It is hidden among shrubby vegetation. The clutch size is usually two or three, and occasionally four eggs. Measuring 21 x 14 mm, the oval eggs are beige, with buff or pink-tinged splotches.

== Gallery ==
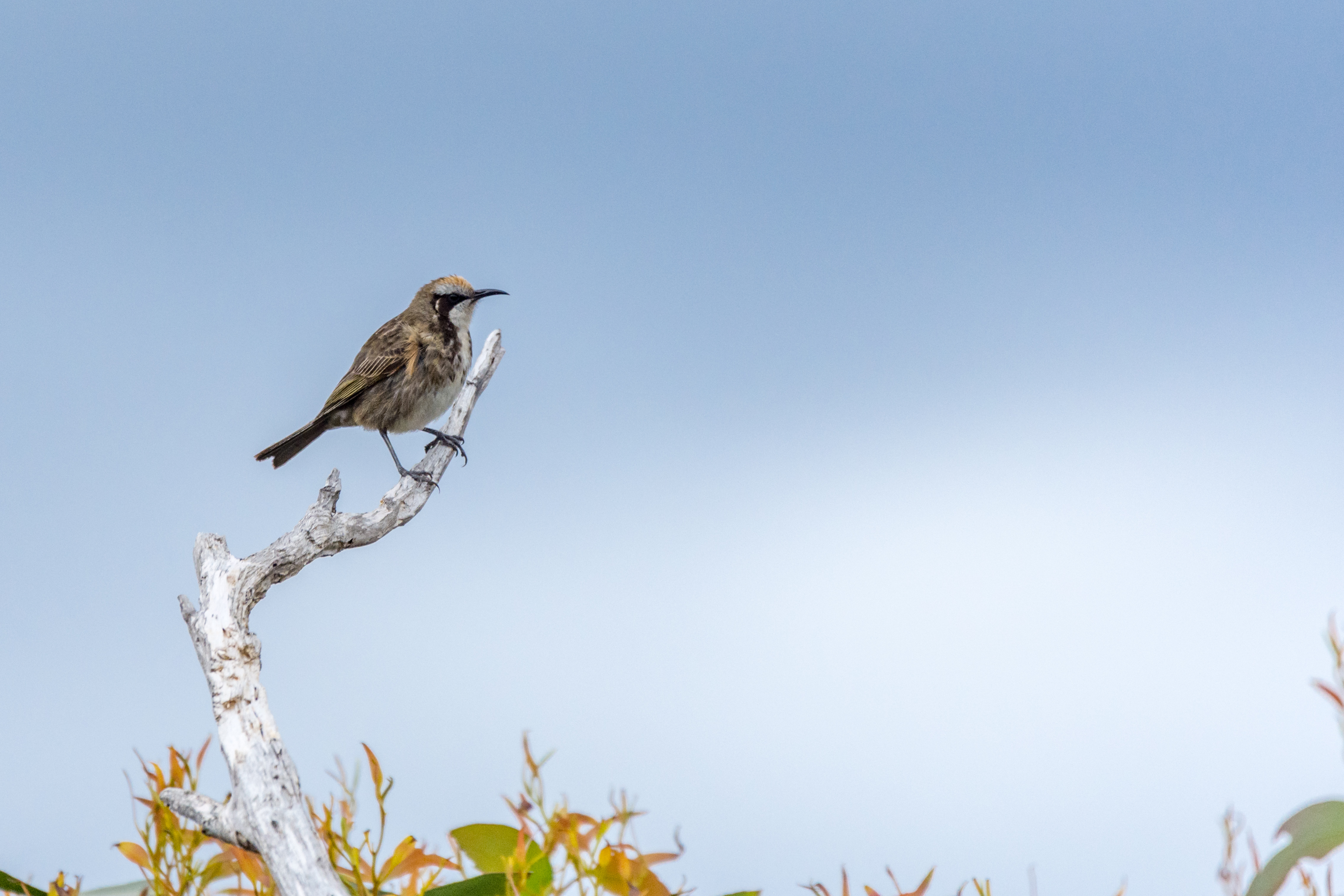
Tawny-crowned honeyeater, Bruny Island, Tasmania
