= Santa Cruz white-eye =

Conservation status
- Least Concern (IUCN 3.1)

Scientific classification
- Kingdom: Animalia
- Phylum: Chordata
- Class: Aves
- Order: Passeriformes
- Family: Zosteropidae
- Genus: Zosterops
- Species: Z. sanctaecrucis

Binomial name
- Zosterops sanctaecrucis Tristram, 1894

Species of bird

The Santa Cruz white-eye (Zosterops sanctaecrucis) is a species of bird in the family Zosteropidae. It is endemic to the Solomon Islands.
