= Guadalcanal honeyeater =

Conservation status
- Least Concern (IUCN 3.1)

Scientific classification
- Kingdom: Animalia
- Phylum: Chordata
- Class: Aves
- Order: Passeriformes
- Family: Meliphagidae
- Genus: Guadalcanaria; Hartert, 1929
- Species: G. inexpectata

Binomial name
- Guadalcanaria inexpectata Hartert, 1929
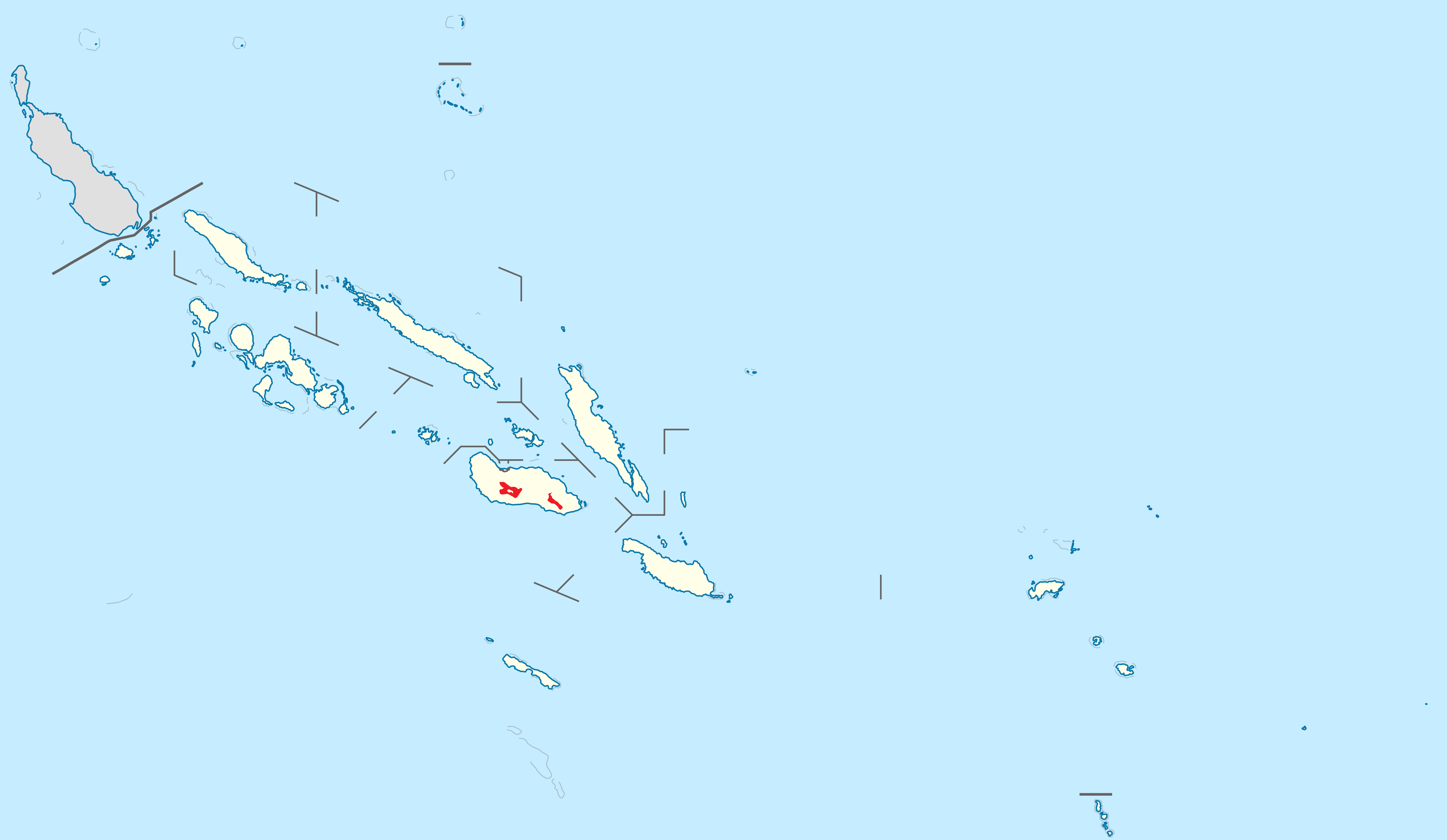

Species of bird

The Guadalcanal honeyeater (Guadalcanaria inexpectata) is a species of bird in the family Meliphagidae. It is the only member of the monotypic genus Guadalcanaria. It is endemic to Guadalcanal in the Solomon Islands, where it is found in montane forest.

== Taxonomy ==
Guadalcanaria and its only current member G. inexpectata were first described in 1929 by Ernst Hartert from specimens collected on Guadalcanal by Rollo Beck and his wife in 1927. The holotype is a male collected by Mrs. Beck. The generic name Guadalcanaria is derived from the type locality, while the specific name inexpectata 'unexpected, surprising, unlooked for' was chosen by Hartert as he thought that "It certainly was unexpected to find such a striking and hitherto unknown species on Guadalcanar".

Guadalcanaria previously contained more than one species, as Ernst Mayr assigned the white-bellied honeyeater of Vanuatu to the genus in 1932, but it was subsequently reassigned.

== Description ==
The male and female of the species look the same but females tend to be smaller.

The upper parts of the adult are slate grey with a brownish tinge on the rump and upper tail coverts. The throat and neck are greyish white. The breast and abdomen are dark grey, and the vent and undertail coverts are brownish grey with indistinct striation.

The ear coverts are a glossy slate grey. On the side of the neck is a tuft of pointed golden-yellow feathers about 2 cm long.

The bill is black and the iris brown.

Immature birds appear similar to the adults but are smaller and less distinctly striated underneath. The tufts on the side of the neck are a paler yellow.

== Distribution and status ==
The species is endemic to Guadalcanal in the Solomon Islands, where it is found in the montane forests of the island. The 2024 IUCN Red List assessment listed it as a least-concern species. It is considered to have a high dependency on forest, but as deforestation is limited in its range the population is considered stable.

As of 2026, the species is on the Search for Lost Birds list for bird species not seen in the last 10 years or more; the last confirmed records of the it are sound recordings made by Frank Lambert on Chupukama Ridge in 2015.
