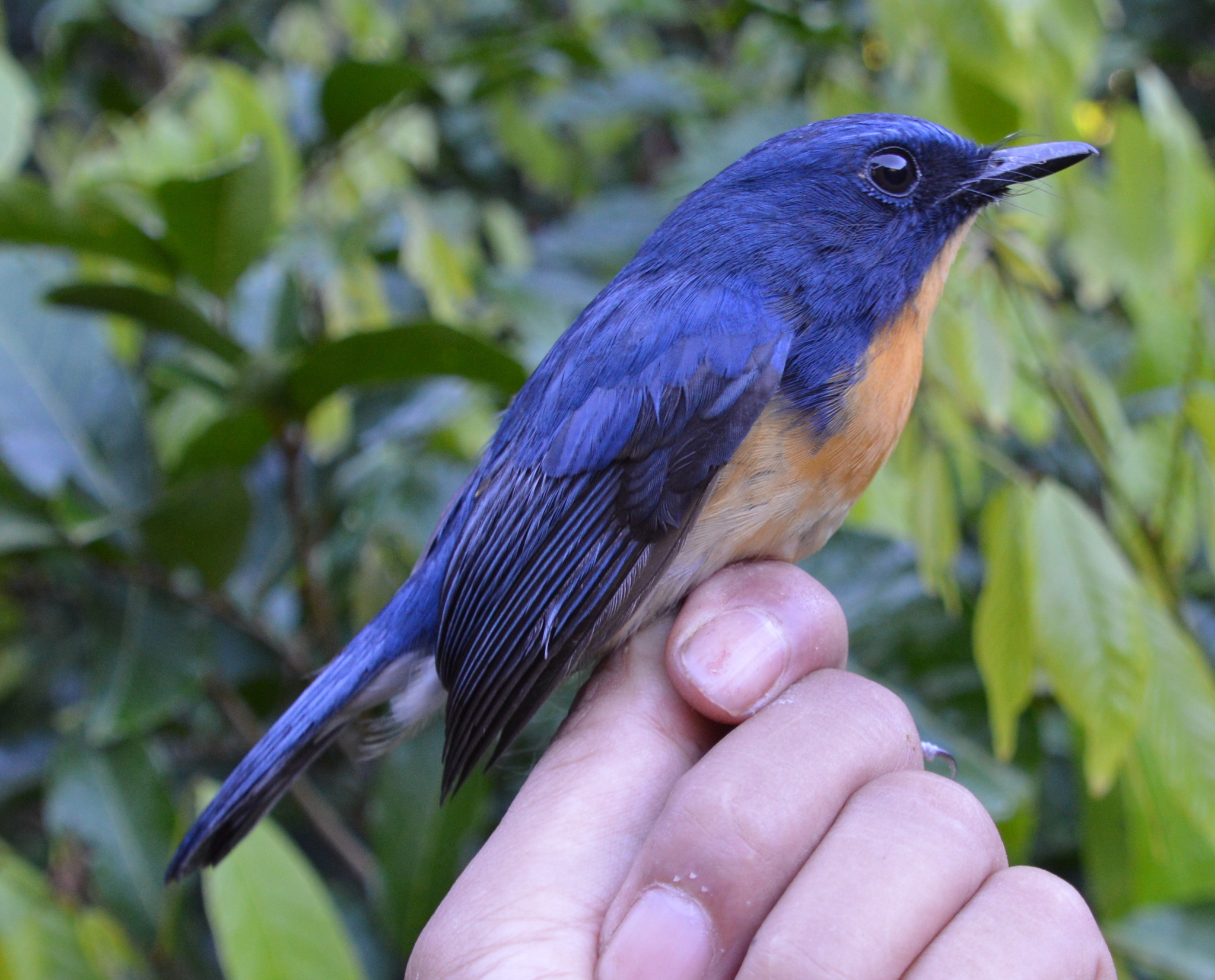
- Paratype male
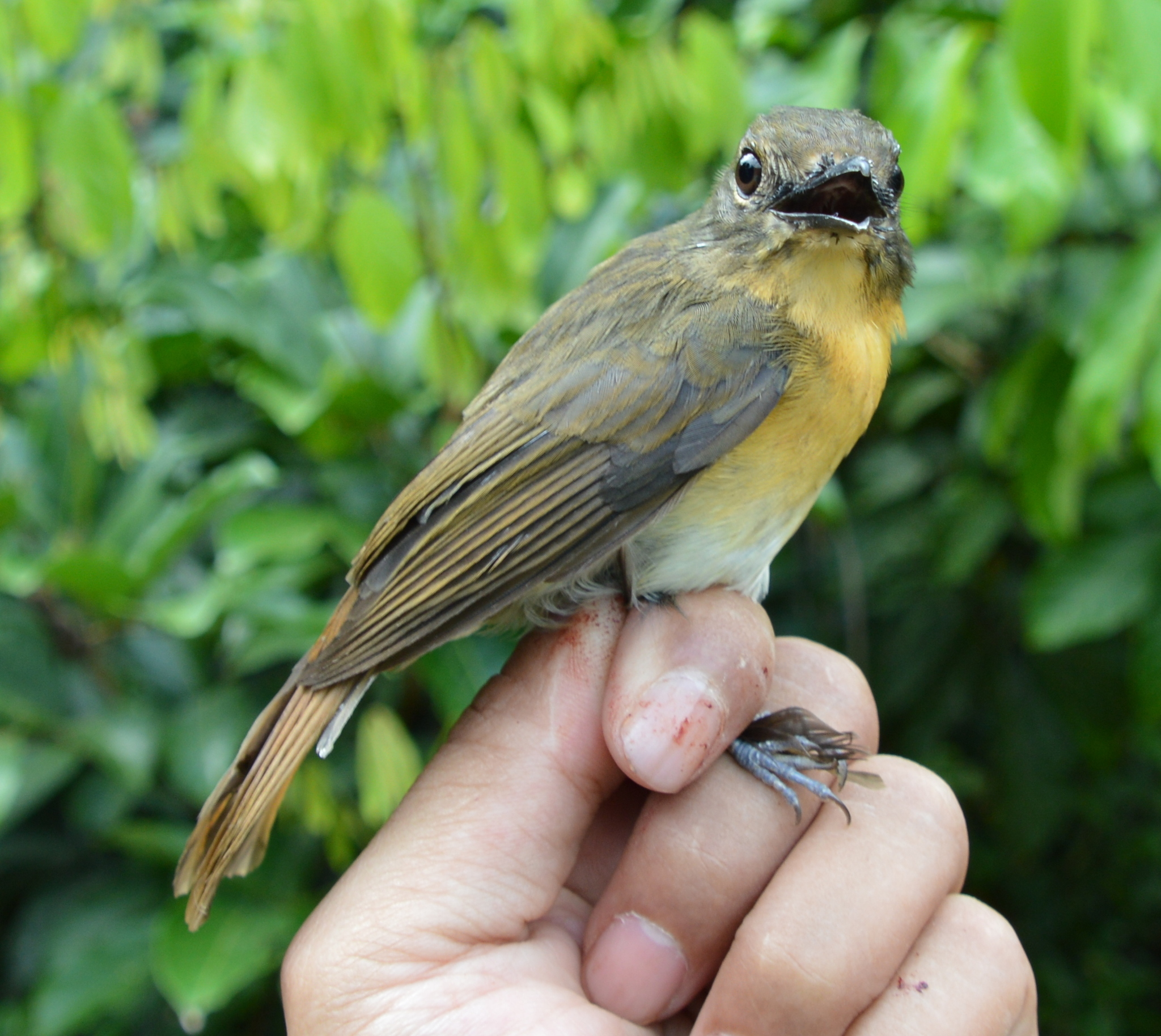
- Paratype female

Conservation status
- Near Threatened (IUCN 3.1)

Scientific classification
- Kingdom: Animalia
- Phylum: Chordata
- Class: Aves
- Order: Passeriformes
- Family: Muscicapidae
- Genus: Cyornis
- Species: C. kadayangensis

Binomial name
- Cyornis kadayangensis Irham, Haryoko, Shakya, Mitchell, S, Burner, Bocos, Eaton, Rheindt, Suparno, Sheldon & Prawiradilaga, 2021

= Meratus blue flycatcher =

Species of bird

The Meratus blue flycatcher (Cyornis kadayangensis) is a species of bird in the Old World flycatcher family, Muscicapidae. The species was described in 2021 by the Indonesian ornithologist Mohammed Irham and his colleagues, based on genetic, morphological, and vocal differences with other Cyornis flycatchers. It is endemic to the Meratus Mountains of Indonesian Borneo, where it has been recorded only from Mount Besar. It is most common at elevations between 900 and 1,300 m (3,000 and 4,300 ft) and inhabits montane rainforest, secondary forest, and rubber plantations. It is sexually dimorphic like other species in its genus; males have blue upperparts, iridescent blue patches on the forehead and shoulders, and orange-and-white underparts, while females have gray-brown heads and upperparts. They have a length of 15.7–16.0 cm (6.2–6.3 in); males weigh 18.5–19.75 g (0.653–0.697 oz) and females weigh 15.75–20.0 g (0.556–0.705 oz).

The species' ecology is mostly unstudied, but it is known to forage in flocks with other insectivores. It is classified as being near threatened by the International Union for Conservation of Nature (IUCN) on the IUCN Red List. It is threatened by habitat loss and the songbird trade. It is thought to be locally common within the small area it inhabits, but its population is suspected to be declining.

== Taxonomy ==
The Meratus Mountains of southeastern Borneo are a small isolated patch of montane forest, surrounded by heavily degraded lowland habitats and separated from Borneo's main mountain range by a distance of around 300 km (190 mi). These mountains have high levels of endemism, but have been poorly studied ornithologically, with few expeditions having studied the birds of the region. Cyornis flycatchers representing a previously-unknown species were first documented from the mountain range in July 2016; specimens of the species were collected the next year by an expedition of the Bogor Zoology Museum and the Louisiana State University Museum of Natural Science. The Meratus blue flycatcher may also have previously been seen during a 1996 expedition by the British ornithologist Geoffrey Davison, although he identified his sightings as hill blue flycatchers.

The species was described in 2021 as Cyornis kadayangensis by the Indonesian ornithologist Mohammed Irham and his colleagues on the basis of an adult male specimen collected from Mount Besar in 2017. This description was based on genetic, morphological, and vocal differences from other Cyornis flycatchers. It was described alongside the Meratus white-eye, another species that was first recorded in 2016. The name of the genus, Cyornis, is derived from the Ancient Greek words kuanos, meaning 'dark blue', and ornis, meaning 'bird'. The specific epithet is named after the Dayak village of Kadayang, which is close to the location from which many type specimens of the species were collected. 'Meratus blue flycatcher' is the official common name designated by the International Ornithologists' Union (IOU); the species is also known in English as the 'Meratus jungle flycatcher'. In Indonesian, it is called Sikatan Kadayang.

The Meratus blue flycatcher is one of 32 species currently placed in the genus Cyornis, in the Old World flycatcher family Muscicapidae. It has no subspecies. The species is sister (most closely related) to the Dayak blue flycatcher of northern Borneo, from which it shows an ND2 sequence divergence of 3.27% on average. These two species are most closely related to a clade (group of all the descendants of a common ancestor) formed by the pale-chinned blue flycatcher and fulvous-chested jungle flycatcher. The Javan blue flycatcher is sister to the clade formed by all four of these species, and has an ND2 sequence divergence of 6.5% from the Meratus blue flycatcher.

== Description ==
Meratus blue flycatchers have a length of 15.7–16.0 cm (6.2–6.3 in) and a mass of 18.5–19.75 g (0.653–0.697 oz) in males and 15.75–20.0 g (0.556–0.705 oz) in females. The wings and tail respectively are 74–76 mm (2.9–3.0 in) and 56–62 mm (2.2–2.4 in) long in males, and 71.8–72.3 mm (2.83–2.85 in) and 56–58 mm (2.2–2.3 in) long in females. Like other blue flycatchers, it is sexually dimorphic; males have blue upperparts with iridescent patches on the head and shoulders, alongside orange-and-white underparts, while females have gray-brown heads and upperparts.

Male Meratus blue flycatchers have intense metallic blue upperparts, from the head to the cheeks, sides of the breast, and rump. The forehead and supercilium are iridescent blue, while the chin and ear-coverts are pitch black. The wings are sepia with indigo to bluish-black edges, the wing coverts are indigo to bluish-black, and the scapulars are pure iridescent blue. The chin, throat, and breast are powder-orange, merging into the greyish-clay brown flanks. The rest of the underparts are whitish; dirty white until the upper belly and pure white thereafter. The underside of the tail is sepia, while the upperside of the tail is black with indigo or bluish-black edges. Some males may have dark blue on the flanks, and one individual was seen with a solitary white rectrix.

Females have mainly olive-green or gray-brown upperparts, from the head to the rump. The lores are whitish and the slender eye-ring is buff-yellow, while the base of the forehead is pale brown. The wings are dark brown, with olive-brown edges. The throat is whitish-cream, turning brownish orange towards ear-coverts. The breast is yellowish-brown, paler towards the flanks, and the belly is white. The uppertail coverts and uppertail are dark brown, while the proximal side of the outer rectrices is blackish. Subadult males have buff-yellow upperparts. The head to the nape (back of the neck) is streaked blackish and the nape to the rump is marked with blackish spots. The lores and eye-ring are also buff-yellow. The wing is mostly blackish with blue-black edges, but the wing coverts are blue with buff-yellow ends. The underparts are light brownish-yellow with dark scales, except for the lower belly, which is white. The underside of the tail is blackish, the upperside of the tail is bluish-black, and the undertail coverts are light yellowish-brown.

The bill is very long, 15.7–16.7 mm (0.62–0.66 in) long in males and 15.4–15.9 mm (0.61–0.63 in) in females, and is much heavier than the Dayak blue flycatcher's. It is black in males and black with a paler lower mandible in subadult males; females have black beaks with grey lower mandibles. The beak appears dark grey in the field. In both males and females, the iris is dark brown. The tarsi and feet are sepia in males, blue-gray in females, and brown-grey in subadult males. However, the legs of both sexes look pale pink in the field.

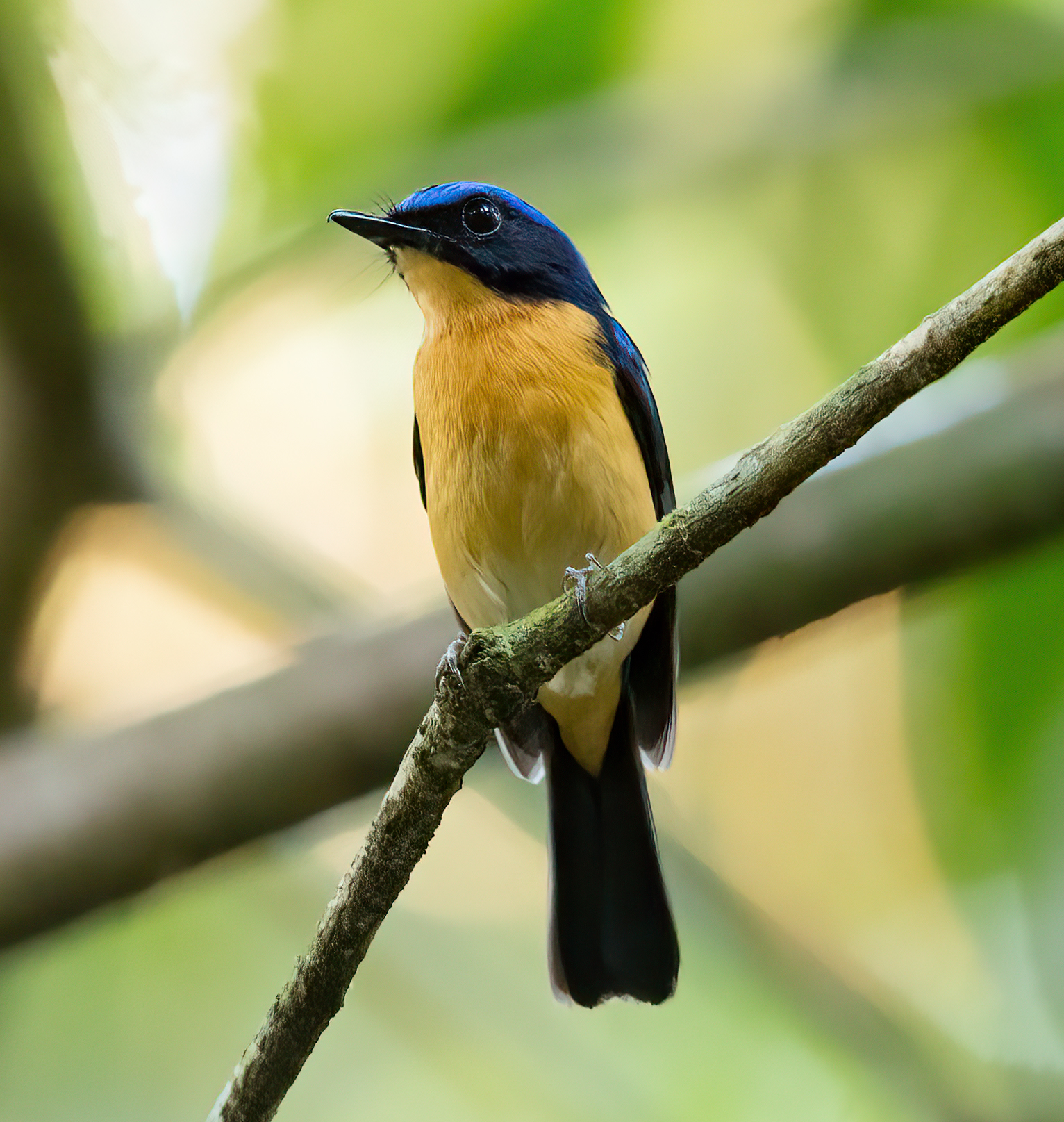
The Bornean blue flycatcher is the only other blue flycatcher to share the Meratus blue flycatcher's range.

The only other blue flycatcher known to inhabit the same range as the Meratus blue flycatcher is the Bornean blue flycatcher. Males of the latter species have bright blue strip on the forehead, supercilium, and nape, blackish cheeks and ear-coverts, and more orange underparts. Female Bornean blue flycatchers are overall much browner in colouration, with more rufous rumps and tails. Several similar species are found elsewhere on Borneo. Male Dayak blue flycatchers have darker upperparts and all-amber underparts, with no white; females similarly have entirely reddish underparts, unlike the white bellies of female Meratus blue flycatchers.

The Sunda blue flycatcher differs in its brighter blue forehead, thicker black stripe from the chin through the cheek and ear-coverts, oranger underparts, and the absence of electric blue upperparts. Female Sunda blue flycatchers have bluish, instead of brownish, tails. Mangrove blue flycatchers have more electric blue foreheads, mainly orange-rufous underparts, and black chins and tails; females of this species show less sexual dimorphism, differing only in their whitish lores and chins. Javan blue flycatchers have shorter bills, less blue on the forehead, blackish cheeks and ear-coverts, and paler upperparts, as well as less extensive white on the underparts. Male Malaysian blue flycatchers can be told apart by their completely blue upper breasts; females of the species are similar to males, with blue upperparts.

=== Vocalisations ===
The song of the Meratus blue flycatcher is a sequence of 3–7 measured and drawn out glissading notes, 1–3 seconds long in all. The terminal notes are sometimes faster and lower-pitched than the rest of the song. The song is vocally distinct from the songs of all other species in the Javan blue flycatcher complex other than the Dayak blue flycatcher. Linear discriminant analysis suggests that the songs of the Meratus and Dayak blue flycatchers are also very distinct. Songs are known to be given in the early morning. The species' alarm call is an urgent 'chee-wheeet', with the first syllable upslurred; other calls include "soft, dry clicks and chirps".

== Distribution and habitat ==
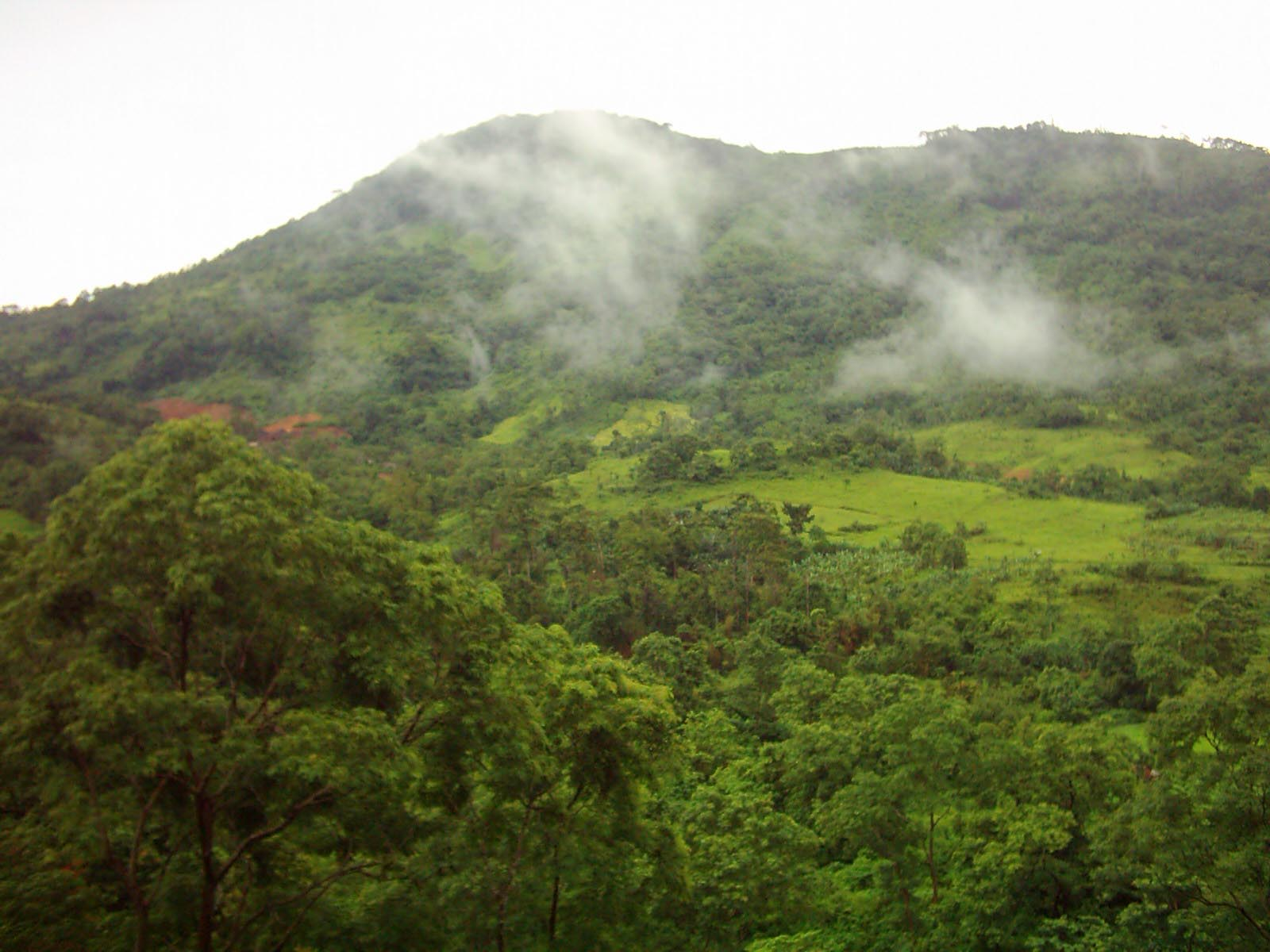
The Meratus blue flycatcher inhabits forests in the Meratus Mountains of Borneo.

The species is endemic to the Meratus Mountains in Indonesian Borneo, where it has been recorded only from Mount Besar. Earlier sightings of Cyornis flycatchers at Mount Karokangen may also represent this species, but cannot be confirmed. The species is most common at elevations between 900 and 1,300 m (3,000 and 4,300 ft), but has been recorded as low as 500 m (1,600 ft) and as high as 1,350 m (4,430 ft). At elevations of 900–1,350 m (2,950–4,430 ft), it is known to inhabit closed-canopy montane rainforest somewhat disturbed by the harvesting of forest products. At 500 m (1,600 ft), it is known from secondary forest made by shifting cultivation, gardening, and logging, as well as highland forest combined with rubber plantations. The species is assumed to be non-migratory.

== Ecology and conservation ==
Most aspects of the Meratus blue flycatcher's ecology are unknown. Its diet is unknown, but it has been seen in mixed-species foraging flocks with other insectivores such as the Meratus white-eye. Its breeding season is also unknown, although subadults have been collected in May.

The Meratus blue flycatcher is classified as being near threatened by the International Union for Conservation of Nature (IUCN) on the IUCN Red List. It has a very small range, and the authors of the study describing it recommended it be assessed as vulnerable due to its restricted distribution and pressure due to the songbird trade. The species' abundance has not been formally quantified, but it is thought to be locally common within the small area it inhabits; however, its population is suspected to be declining. The species is moderately dependent on forests and is mainly threatened by habitat loss, especially at lower elevations, where deforestation due to agriculture has led to almost complete loss of forests in some areas. Overall, around 5–7% of the forest in the flycatcher's range has been lost in the decade before 2022. The species is also threatened by the Indonesian trade in songbirds, having first been recorded from local songbird markets in 2022. Pellet-gun hunting and the wildlife trade have caused declines in many other species of small birds in the Meratus Mountains; demand from the trade has also seen swift falls in the populations of other Indonesian Cyornis flycatchers like the Javan blue flycatcher. Anecdotal reports from the Meratus Mountains have found that increasing ecotourism for birdwatching in the region may reduce incentives to poach birds.

The species is not protected by Indonesian law and is currently known from a single protected area, the Pleihari Martapura Wildlife Reserve, which covers only a portion of its altitudinal range. The Meratus Mountains it inhabits are designated as an Important Bird Area by BirdLife International. Recommended conservation measures for the species include surveys to accurately estimate its population, finding the demand for the species in the songbird trade, and finding suitable tracts of habitat to protect.

== See also ==
- List of bird species described in the 2020s
