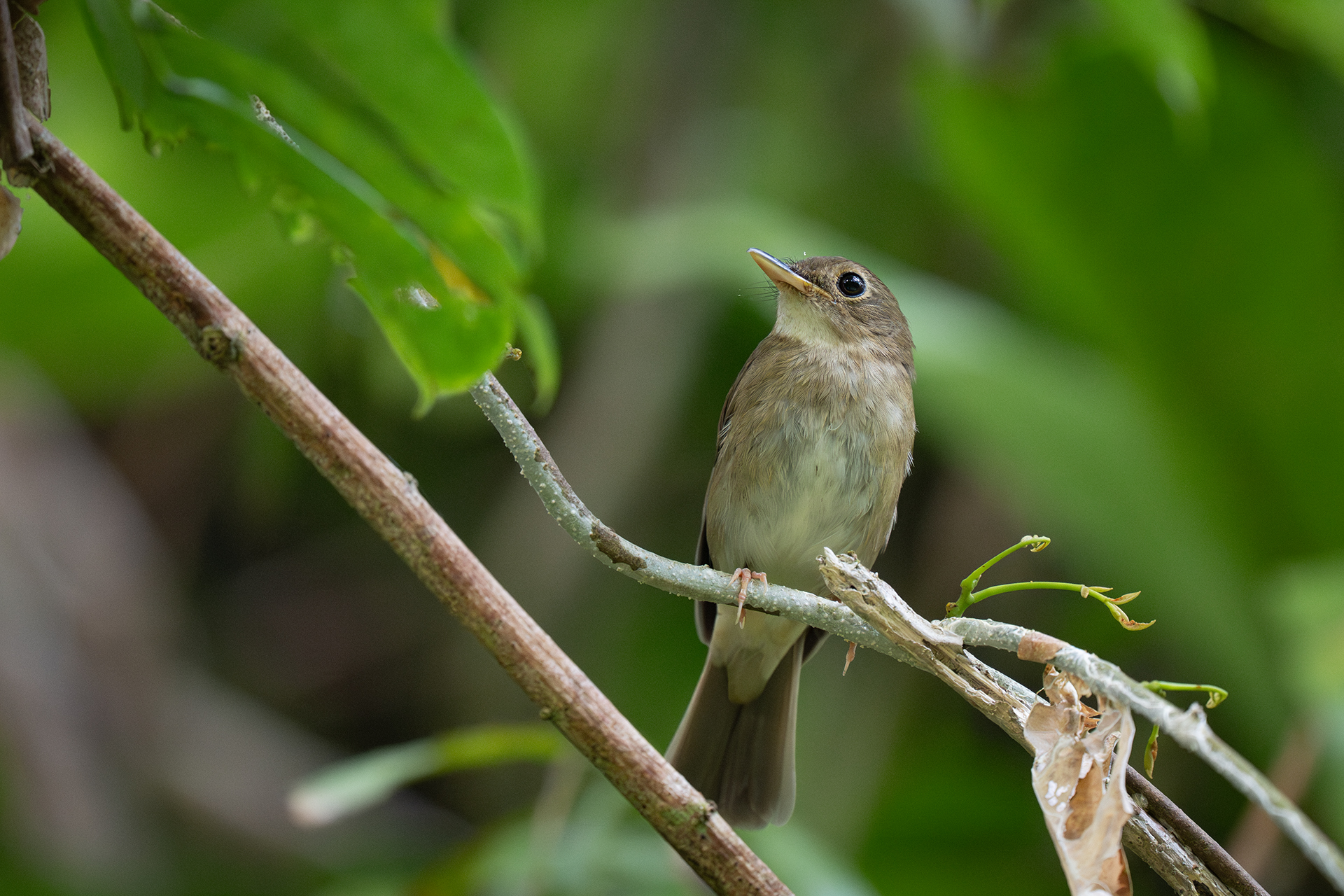

Conservation status
- Near Threatened (IUCN 3.1)

Scientific classification
- Kingdom: Animalia
- Phylum: Chordata
- Class: Aves
- Order: Passeriformes
- Family: Muscicapidae
- Genus: Cyornis
- Species: C. nicobaricus

Binomial name
- Cyornis nicobaricus (Richmond, 1902)

= Nicobar jungle flycatcher =

Species of bird

The Nicobar jungle flycatcher (Cyornis nicobaricus) is a species of bird in the Old World flycatcher family, Muscicapidae. It is endemic to the Nicobar Islands, where its natural habitats are subtropical or tropical moist lowland forests and subtropical or tropical mangrove forests.

== Taxonomy ==
It was once considered a subspecies of the brown-chested jungle flycatcher. This species was previously placed in the genus Rhinomyias but was moved to Cyornis based on the results of a 2010 molecular phylogenetic study.

== Description ==
The Nicobar jungle flycatcher is a medium-large flycatcher that reaches an average length of 14–15 cm (5.5–5.9 in). Adults are largely brownish in colour, albeit with large amounts of white below. The breast and flanks are brown, while the rest of the underparts, including the chin and throat, are white. The eye is surrounded by a buff or tawny orbital ring. The wings are short and have rufous margins to the feathers. The undertail coverts are buff to peach. The bill is black and the legs are pink. Females are similar to males, but smaller in size, while juveniles can be distinguished from adults by their scaly-looking upperparts.

== Distribution and habitat ==
The Nicobar jungle flycatcher is endemic to the southern Nicobar Islands in the Indian state of Andaman and Nicobar Islands. Found on the islands of Great and Little Nicobar, it is a non-migratory inhabitant of forests, thickets, and gardens. It forages in the understorey and low in the canopy, feeding largely on insects.
