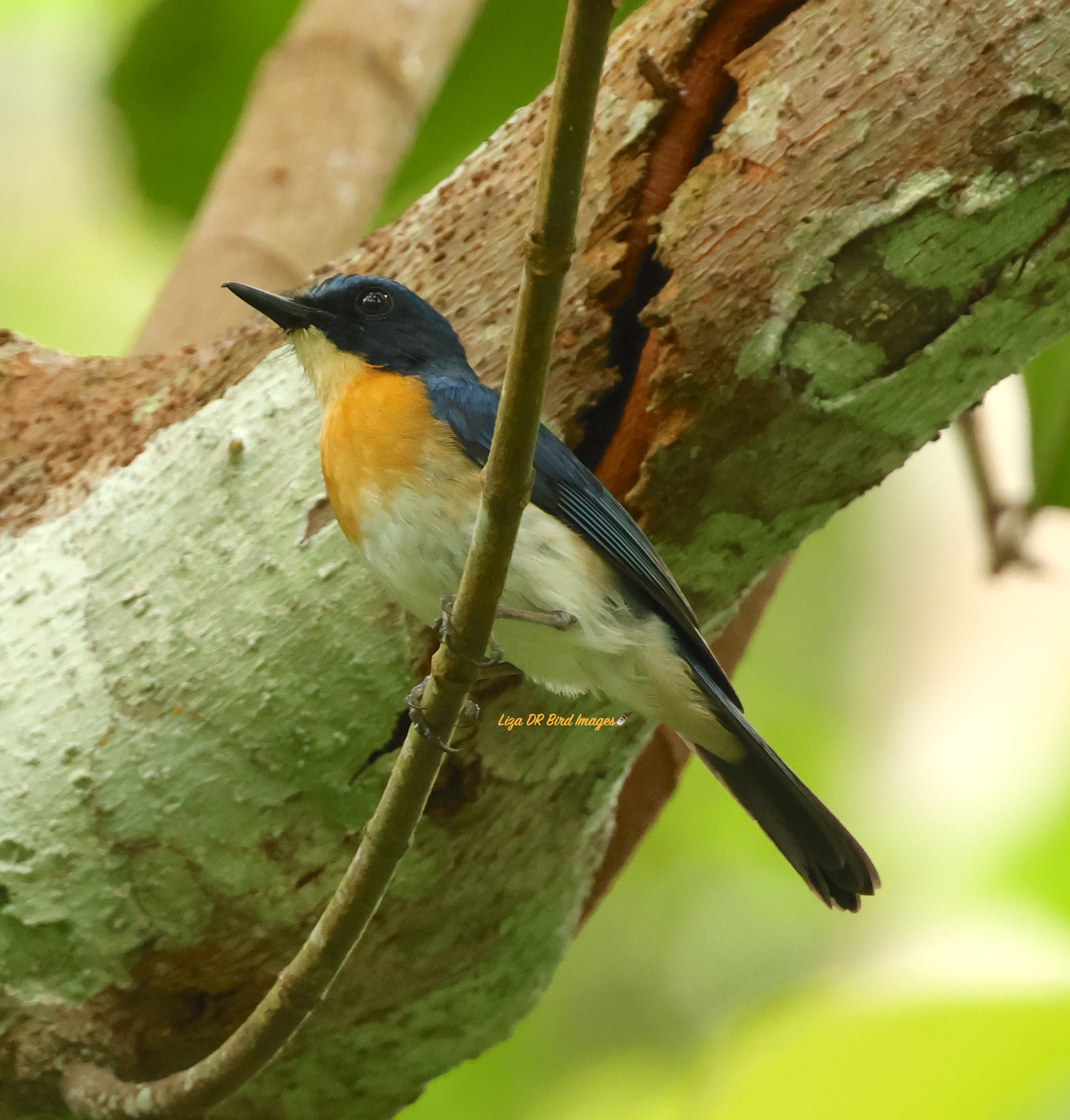
- Male
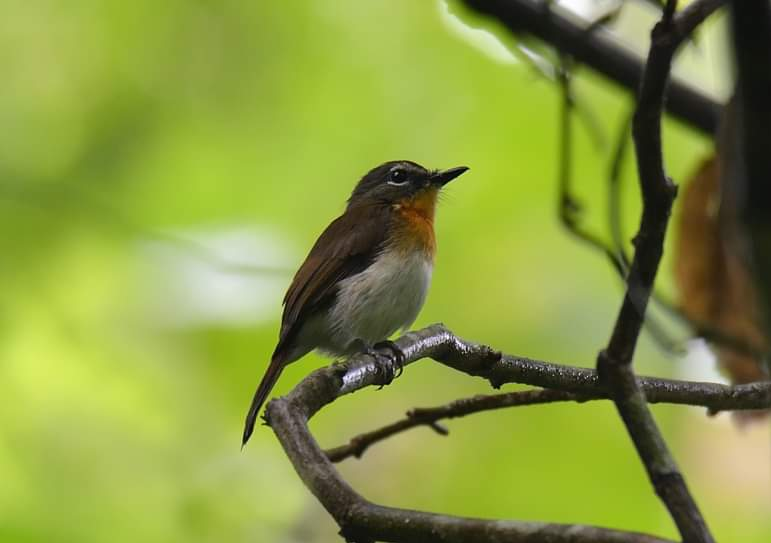
- Female

Conservation status
- Near Threatened (IUCN 3.1)

Scientific classification
- Kingdom: Animalia
- Phylum: Chordata
- Class: Aves
- Order: Passeriformes
- Family: Muscicapidae
- Genus: Cyornis
- Species: C. lemprieri

Binomial name
- Cyornis lemprieri (Sharpe, 1884)

= Palawan blue flycatcher =

Species of bird

The Palawan blue flycatcher (Cyornis lemprieri) is a species of bird in the family Muscicapidae. It is endemic to the Philippines found only on Palawan and its surrounding islands.

Its natural habitat is tropical moist lowland forests. It is threatened by habitat loss.

== Description and taxonomy ==
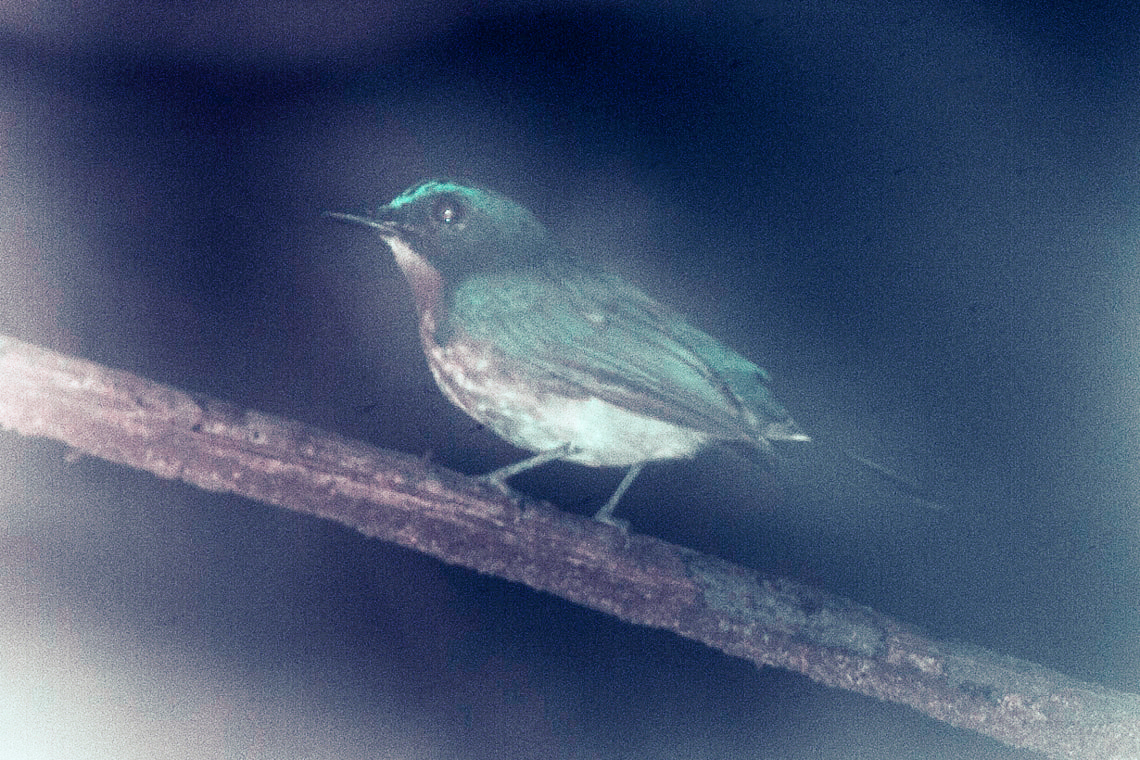
A male

Was once considered conspecific with the Javan blue flycatcher as their songs are very similar but these species were separated due to plummage differences as th Palawan blue flycatcher has a white throat and belly in comparison to the Javan's orange. This species is monotypic.

== Ecology and behavior ==
Diet mostly unknown but presumed to feed on insects. Usually solitary or in a pairs. Forages in the lower understorey of the forest.

Breeding season believe to be from April to May, possibly June. Only one nest has ever been found, which was made of dried grass in a hollow tree stump. This nest took 15 to 16 days to incubate and both parents were involved in the feeding of the chick.

== Habitat and conservation status ==
The species inhabits tropical moist lowland primary forest and secondary forest up to 1,000 meters above sea level.

It is assessed as near threatened under the IUCN with populations believed to be decreasing due to habitat loss and deforestation. The whole of Palawan was designated as a Biosphere Reserve; however, protection and enforcement of laws has been difficult and these threats still continue. It occurs in the protected area in Puerto Princesa Subterranean River National Park.
