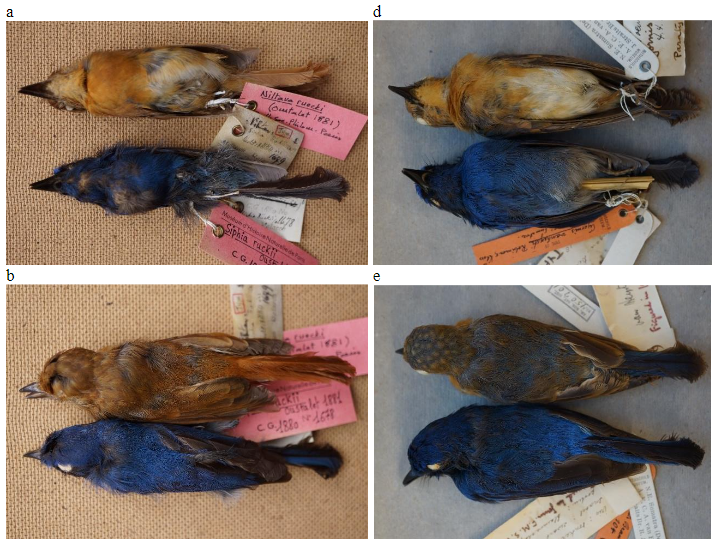
- Left side (a and b): Top specimen is an adult female, bottom is an adult male, both described by Oustalet. Right side (d and e): Top specimen is an immature male, bottom is an adult male, both described by Robinson & Kloss.
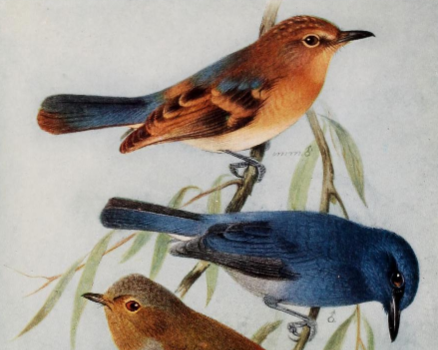

Conservation status
- Critically Endangered (IUCN 3.1)
- CITES Appendix II

Scientific classification
- Kingdom: Animalia
- Phylum: Chordata
- Class: Aves
- Order: Passeriformes
- Family: Muscicapidae
- Genus: Cyornis
- Species: C. ruckii

Binomial name
- Cyornis ruckii (Oustalet, 1881)
- Distribution of C. ruckii

Synonyms
- Cyornis vanheysti Robinson & Kloss, 1919

= Rück's blue flycatcher =

Species of bird from Indonesia

Rück's blue flycatcher (Cyornis ruckii) is a passerine bird in the Old World flycatcher family Muscicapidae. It is known from only four specimens and is endemic to a small area in northeast Sumatra, Indonesia, inhabiting primary lowland forest. Although all specimens share common characteristics, such as a black bill, brown iris, and black feet, two of the collected specimens show some physical discrepancy with the other two. They were initially described as Cyornis vanheysti before being accepted as specimens of C. ruckii. Rück's blue flycatcher has also been compared to other species of Cyornis.

The species is listed as "Critically Endangered" by the International Union for Conservation of Nature as it has not been recorded since 1918. It has been protected by Indonesian law since 1972. It also might have been affected by the 2004 Indian Ocean tsunami.

== Taxonomy ==
Rück's blue flycatcher was first described by the French zoologist Émile Oustalet in 1881, who studied two specimens (adult male and female) in the French National Museum of Natural History. The specimens were sent by Monsieur Rück from a trading port in modern-day Malacca, Malaysia, in 1880. Oustalet named the species after Rück and gave it the binomial name Cyornis ruckii. The binomial is sometimes emended to the Cyornis rueckii, but this is regarded as an incorrect spelling. Other common names for the species include Rueck's blue flycatcher and Rueck's niltava.

A further two specimens (adult male and immature male) were collected by A. van Heyst in 1917 and 1918 near Medan, where they were subsequently described as a new species (Cyornis vanheysti) by the British zoologists Herbert Robinson and Cecil Kloss in 1919. They also noted their similarity to the specimens described by Oustalet, eventually synonymizing C. vanheysti with C. ruckii. The specimens reside in the American Museum of Natural History.

The specimens have also been considered as being an aberrant form of the pale blue flycatcher (Cyornis unicolor). However, comparisons show that the pale blue flycatcher is different in both color and topography. Rück's blue flycatcher is monotypic.

== Description ==
Rück's blue flycatcher is 17 cm (6.7 in) in length, with a black bill, brown iris and black feet. Differences between the specimens described by Oustalet and Robinson & Kloss exist. In the Oustalet specimens, the male has dark blue plumage, a blue belly, and a shining blue rump. There is also a small amount of grey coloring on disrupted feathers around the legs. The female has rufous-brown plumage, strong rufous lores, orange-rufous breast and a whitish belly. In the Robinson & Kloss specimens, the immature male has brown-spotted buff plumage with a rufous breast and a whitish center on underparts. The adult male shows some discrepancy with the adult male specimen described by Oustalet; the belly and tail coverts are whitish grey, while the flanks are bluish grey. Additionally, the Robinson & Kloss specimens have slightly larger bills. These differences could be caused by individual variation or due to the specimens being of different subspecies.

== Distribution and habitat ==
Rück's blue flycatcher is endemic to Sumatra, Indonesia, around Medan, and presumably has a low population density. The specimens collected by Rück were from primary lowland forest, while the ones collected by van Heyst are thought to be from exploited forest, which might show possible tolerance against habitat degradation, although this is disputed. (Note: Nigel Collar states that reviews of earlier texts dispute the origin of the specimens collected by van Heyst, arguing that they almost certainly also come from primary forest.)

== Conservation ==
Last recorded in 1918, and due to ongoing habitat loss, poor surveying, and its small population and limited range, Rück's blue flycatcher is evaluated as "Critically Endangered" on the IUCN Red List. It is listed in Appendix II of CITES and has been protected under Indonesian law since 1972. In 2013 and 2014, observations in Jambi, Sumatra, revealed a pair of unidentified flycatchers that resembled Rück's blue flycatcher, but the possibility of them being white-tailed flycatchers (Cyornis concretus) could not be eliminated. Rück's blue flycatcher might have been affected by the 2004 Indian Ocean tsunami, and is also predicted to be extinct with 80% confidence.
