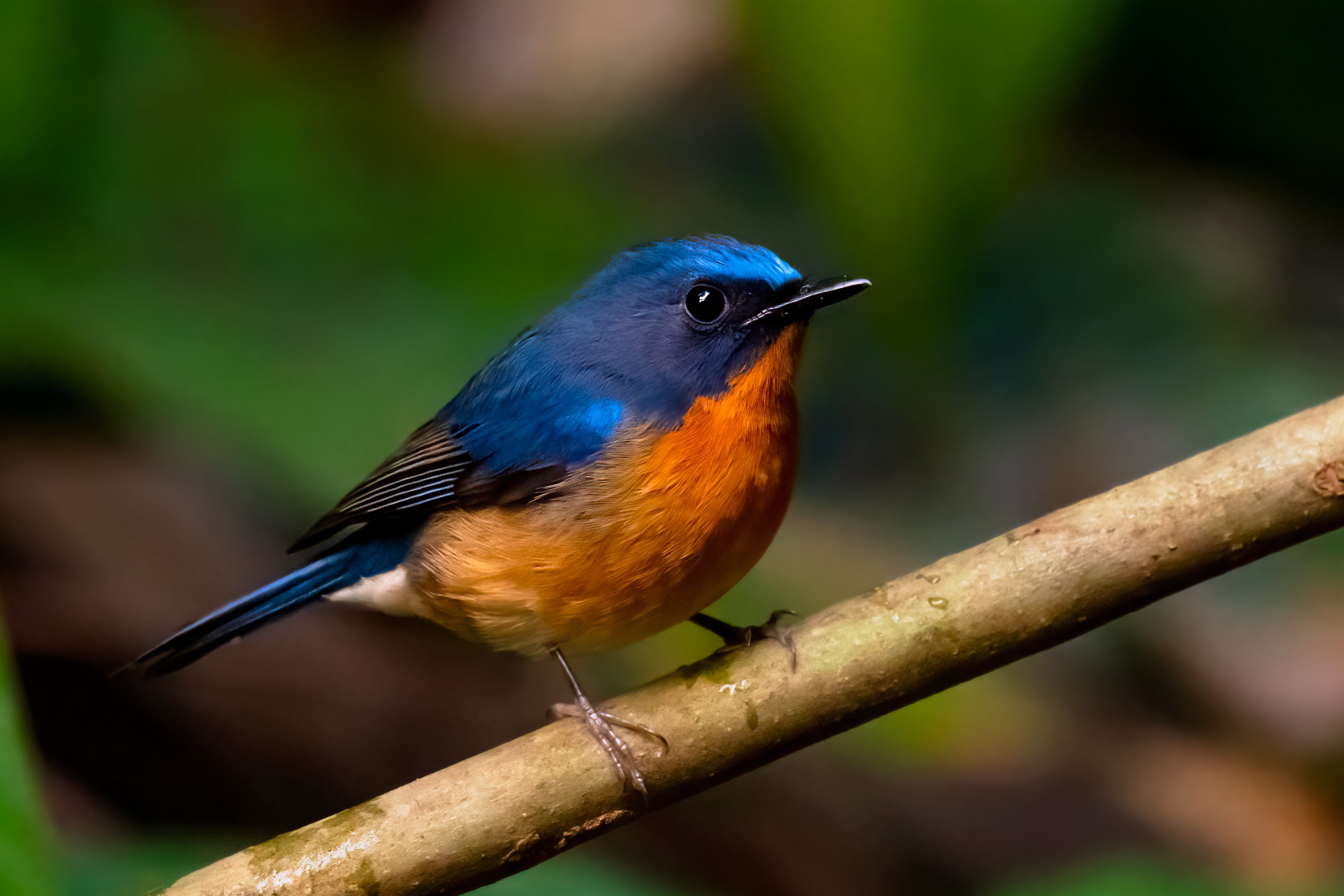

Conservation status
- Least Concern (IUCN 3.1)

Scientific classification
- Kingdom: Animalia
- Phylum: Chordata
- Class: Aves
- Order: Passeriformes
- Family: Muscicapidae
- Genus: Cyornis
- Species: C. whitei

Binomial name
- Cyornis whitei Harington, 1908

= Hill blue flycatcher =

Species of bird

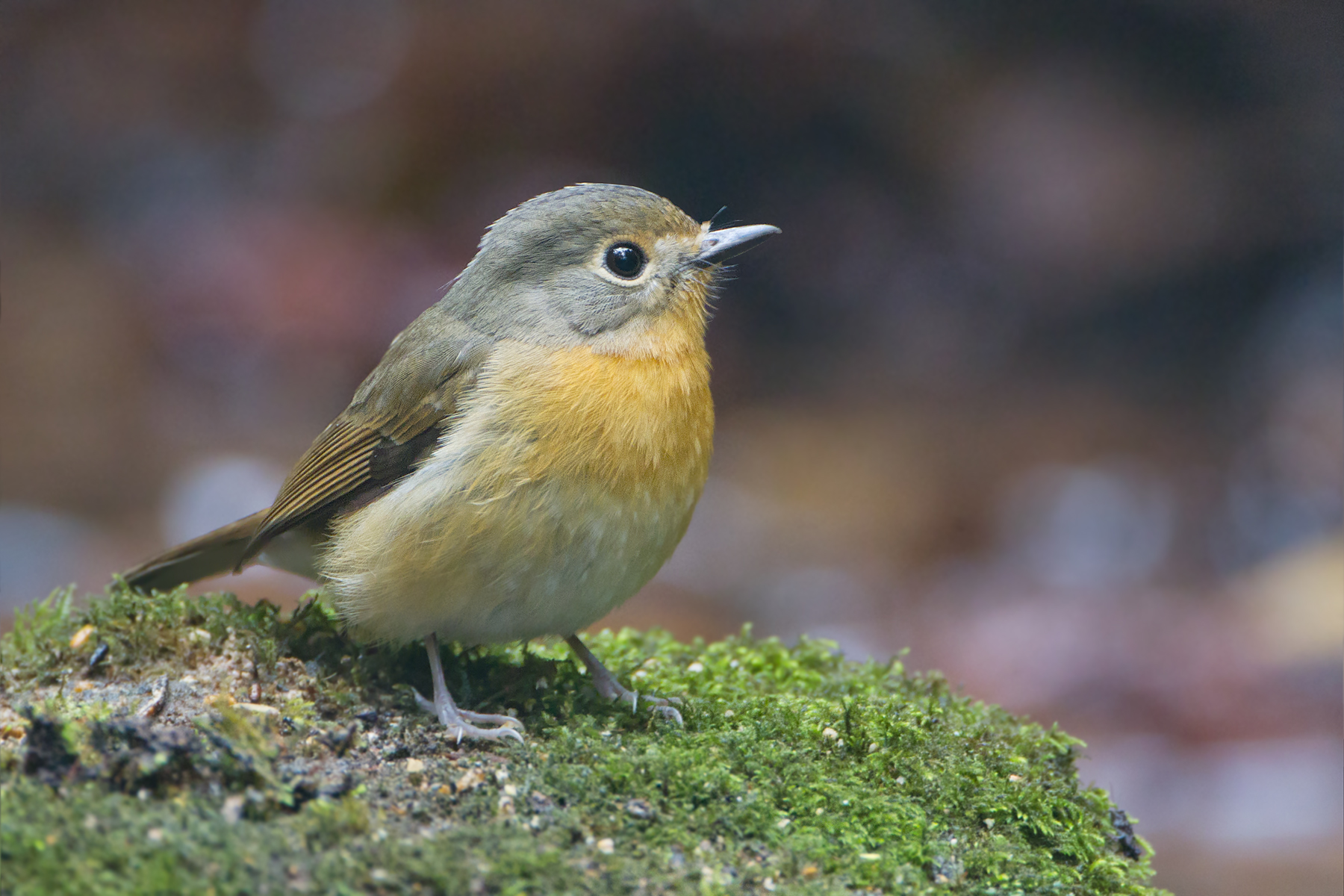
female

The hill blue flycatcher (Cyornis whitei) is a species of bird in the family Muscicapidae. It is found in southern China, northeastern India and Southeast Asia.

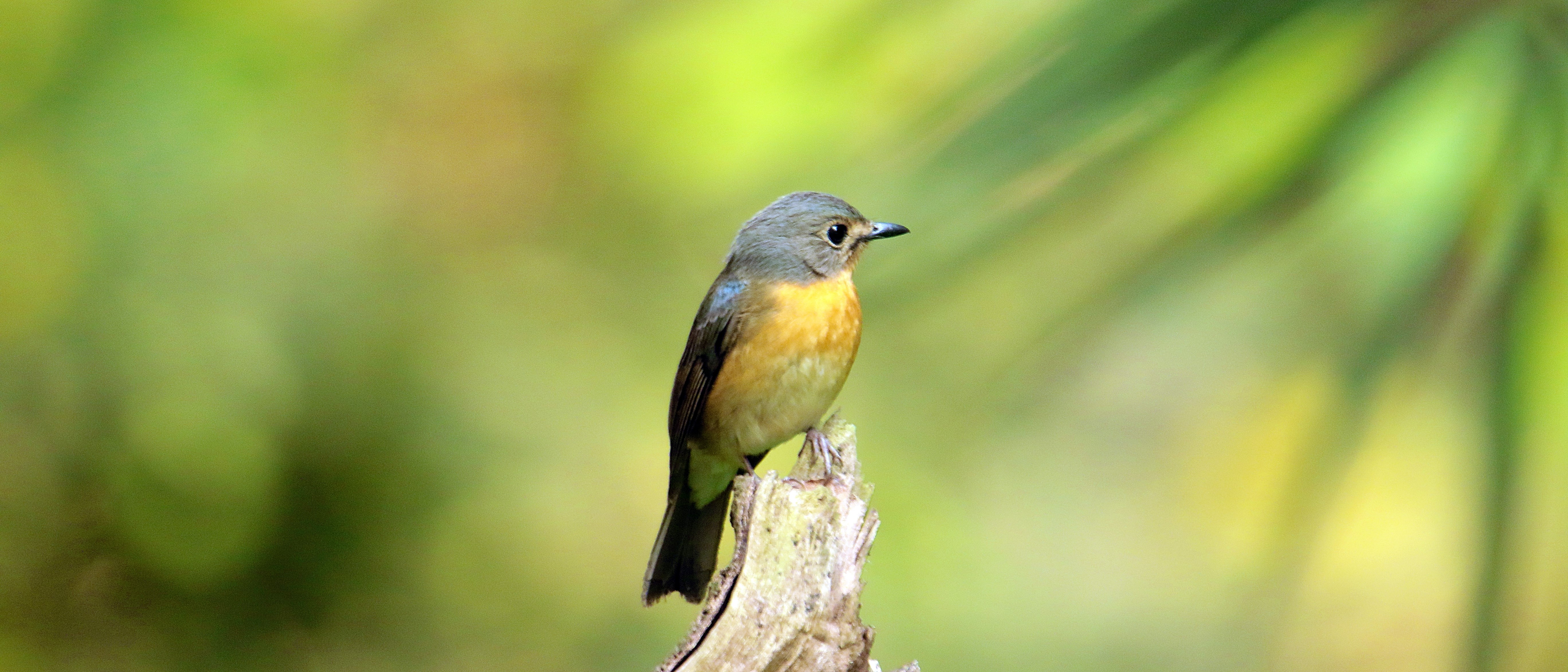
Female

It was treated as a subspecies of Cyornis banyumas before molecular phylogenetic studies found them to be distinct.
