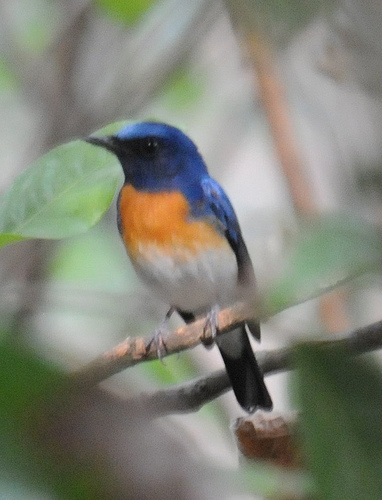
- Blue-throated blue flycatcher (C. rubeculoides)

Scientific classification
- Kingdom: Animalia
- Phylum: Chordata
- Class: Aves
- Order: Passeriformes
- Family: Muscicapidae
- Genus: Cyornis; Blyth, 1843

Type species
- Phoenicura rubeculoides Vigors, 1831

Synonyms
- Rhinomyias Sharpe, 1879

= Cyornis =

Genus of birds

Cyornis is a genus of birds in the Old World flycatcher family Muscicapidae most of which are native to Southeast Asia.

== Taxonomy ==
The genus Cyornis was introduced by the English zoologist Edward Blyth in 1843. He listed three species in the genus but did not specify which he considered to be the type species. The type was subsequently designated by George Gray in 1855 as Phoenicura rubeculoides Vigors, 1831, the blue-throated blue flycatcher. The genus name combines the Ancient Greek kuanos meaning "dark-blue" with ornis meaning "bird".

== Species ==
The genus contains the following 32 species:

Image	Common name	Scientific name	Distribution
	Pale blue flycatcher	Cyornis unicolor	Southeast Asia
	Chinese blue flycatcher	Cyornis glaucicomans	central China; winters to the Malay Peninsula
	Blue-throated blue flycatcher	Cyornis rubeculoides	Himalayas and western Indochina; winters to southern Western Ghats and Sri Lanka
	Hainan blue flycatcher	Cyornis hainanus	southern China, Hainan and Indochina
	Bornean blue flycatcher	Cyornis superbus	Borneo
	Malayan blue flycatcher	Cyornis turcosus	Malay Peninsula, Sumatra and Borneo
	Palawan blue flycatcher	Cyornis lemprieri	Palawan
-	Sunda blue flycatcher	Cyornis caerulatus	Borneo, Sumatra
-	Blue-breasted blue flycatcher	Cyornis herioti	Luzon
-	Rufous-breasted blue flycatcher	Cyornis camarinensis	Luzon and Catanduanes
-	Philippine jungle flycatcher	Cyornis ruficauda	Philippines
-	Sulu jungle flycatcher	Cyornis ocularis	Sulu Archipelago
-	Crocker jungle flycatcher	Cyornis ruficrissa	montane Borneo
	White-bellied blue flycatcher	Cyornis pallidipes	Western Ghats
	Brown-chested jungle flycatcher	Cyornis brunneatus	southeast China; winters to Malay Peninsula
-	Nicobar jungle flycatcher	Cyornis nicobaricus	Nicobar Islands
-	Grey-chested jungle flycatcher	Cyornis umbratilis	Malay Peninsula, Sumatra and Borneo
	Large blue flycatcher	Cyornis magnirostris	eastern Himalayas; winters to Kra Isthmus
	Tickell's blue flycatcher	Cyornis tickelliae	India and Sri Lanka
	Indochinese blue flycatcher	Cyornis sumatrensis	Indochina
	Hill blue flycatcher	Cyornis whitei	Yunnan and Indochina
	Mangrove blue flycatcher	Cyornis rufigastra	coastal Malesia
	Sulawesi blue flycatcher	Cyornis omissus	Sulawesi
-	Kalao blue flycatcher	Cyornis kalaoensis	Kalao, Sulawesi
-	Javan blue flycatcher	Cyornis banyumas	Java
	Dayak blue flycatcher	Cyornis montanus	Borneo
	Meratus blue flycatcher	Cyornis kadayangensis	Meratus Mountains
	Pale-chinned flycatcher	Cyornis poliogenys	Northeast India and sparsely across east India and Yunnan
	Fulvous-chested jungle flycatcher	Cyornis olivaceus	Kra Isthmus, Sumatra, Java, Riau and northeastern Borneo
-	Banggai jungle flycatcher	Cyornis pelingensis	Peleng
-	Sula jungle flycatcher	Cyornis colonus	Sula Islands
-	Rück's blue flycatcher	Cyornis ruckii	northeastern Sumatra

Seven of the above species, all with "jungle flycatcher" in their English names, were previously placed in the genus Rhinomyias but were moved to Cyornis based on the results of a 2010 molecular phylogenetic study. There are also "jungle flycatchers" in the genus Vauriella.
