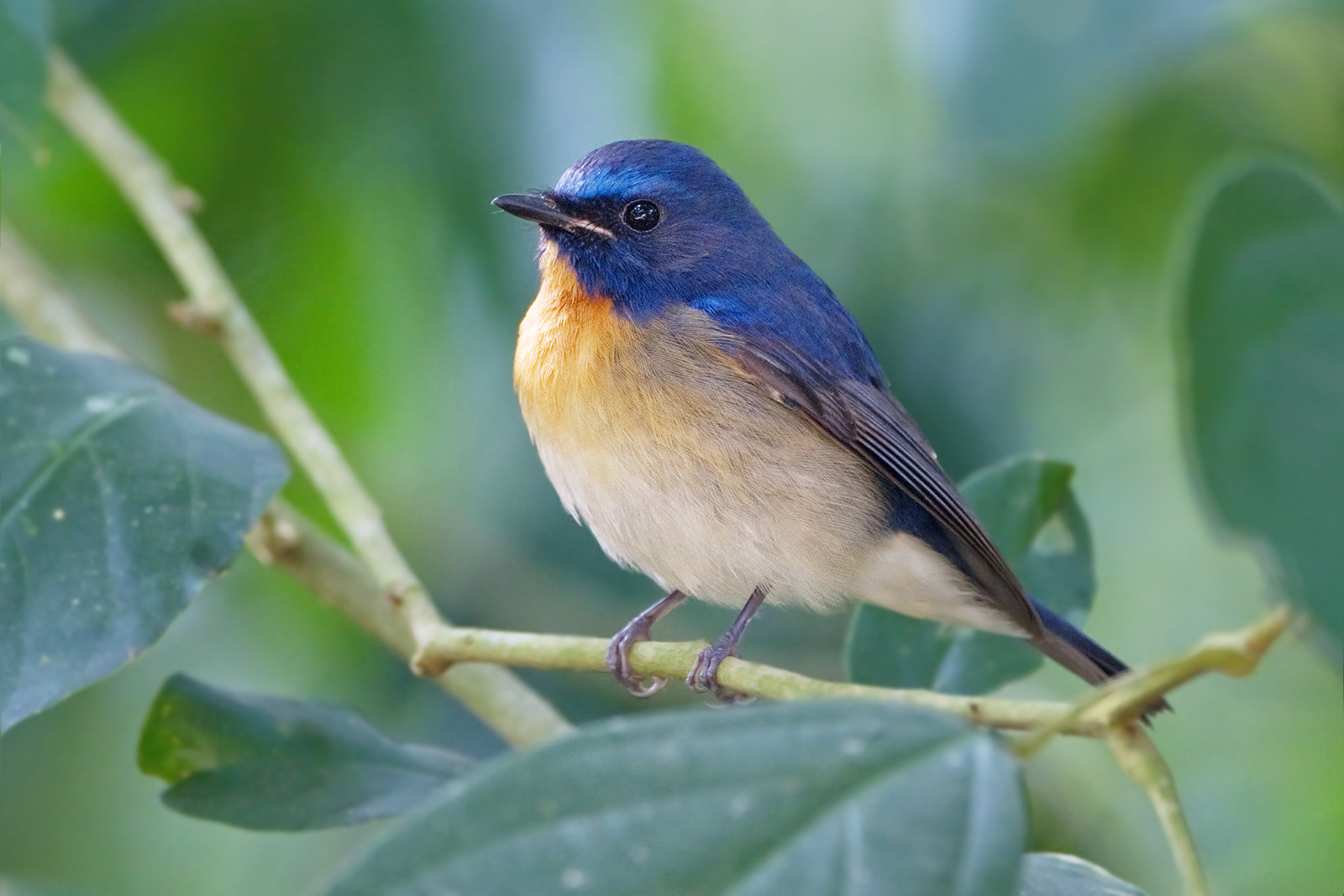

Conservation status
- Least Concern (IUCN 3.1)

Scientific classification
- Kingdom: Animalia
- Phylum: Chordata
- Class: Aves
- Order: Passeriformes
- Family: Muscicapidae
- Genus: Cyornis
- Species: C. glaucicomans

Binomial name
- Cyornis glaucicomans Thayer & Bangs, 1909

Synonyms
- Cyornis rubeculoides glaucicomans

= Chinese blue flycatcher =

Species of bird

The Chinese blue flycatcher (Cyornis glaucicomans) is a small passerine bird in the flycatcher family, Muscicapidae. The Chinese blue flycatcher is native to mid-southern China; it winters to the Tenasserim Hills and the Malay Peninsula. It previously was considered a subspecies of the blue-throated blue flycatcher.
