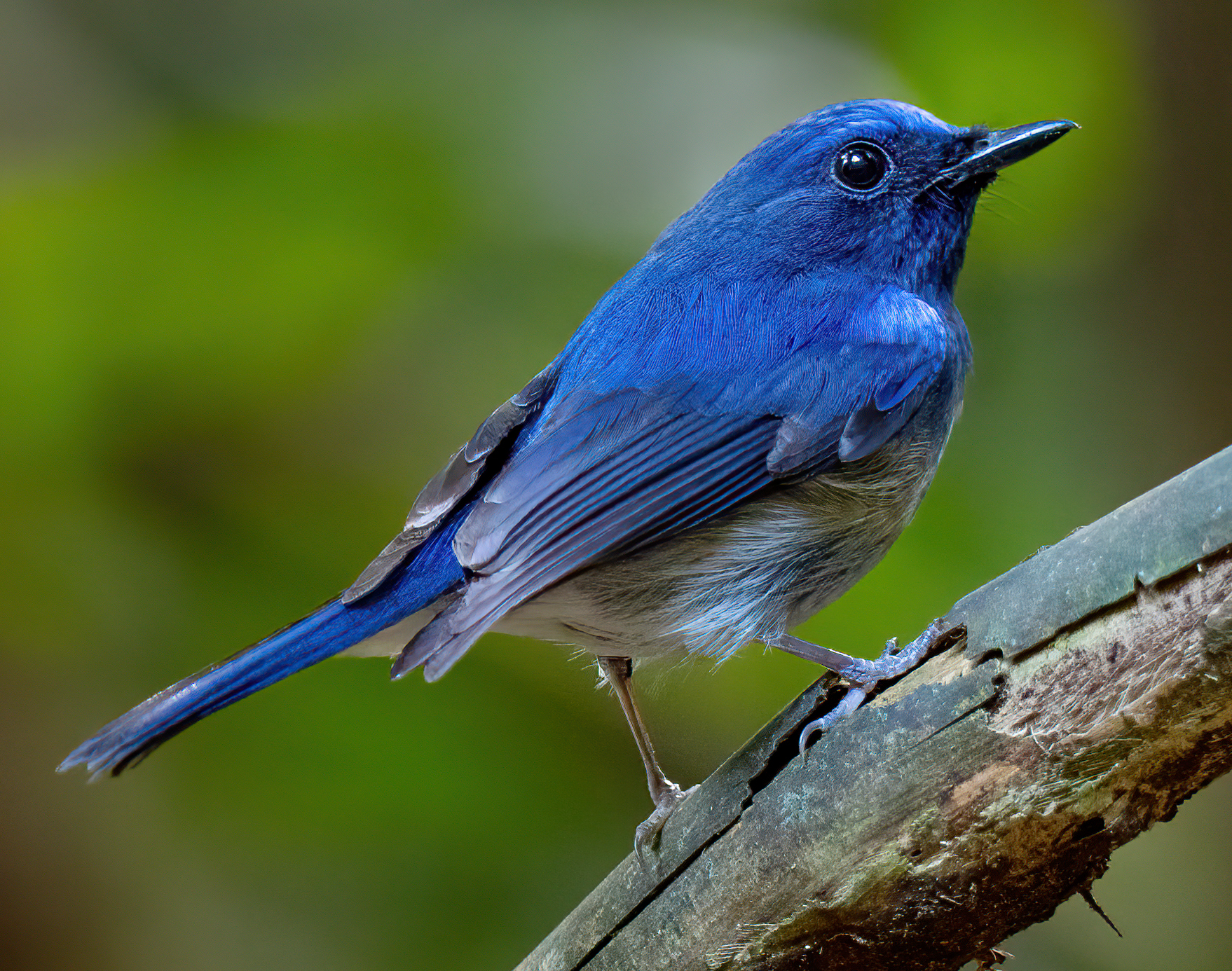
- ...at Cát Tiên National Park

Conservation status
- Least Concern (IUCN 3.1)

Scientific classification
- Kingdom: Animalia
- Phylum: Chordata
- Class: Aves
- Order: Passeriformes
- Family: Muscicapidae
- Genus: Cyornis
- Species: C. hainanus

Binomial name
- Cyornis hainanus (Ogilvie-Grant, 1900)

= Hainan blue flycatcher =

Species of bird

The Hainan blue flycatcher (Cyornis hainanus) is a bird in the family Muscicapidae. The species was first described by William Robert Ogilvie-Grant in 1900. It is native to southern China, Hainan and Indochina. Its natural habitat is subtropical or tropical moist lowland forests.

== Gallery ==
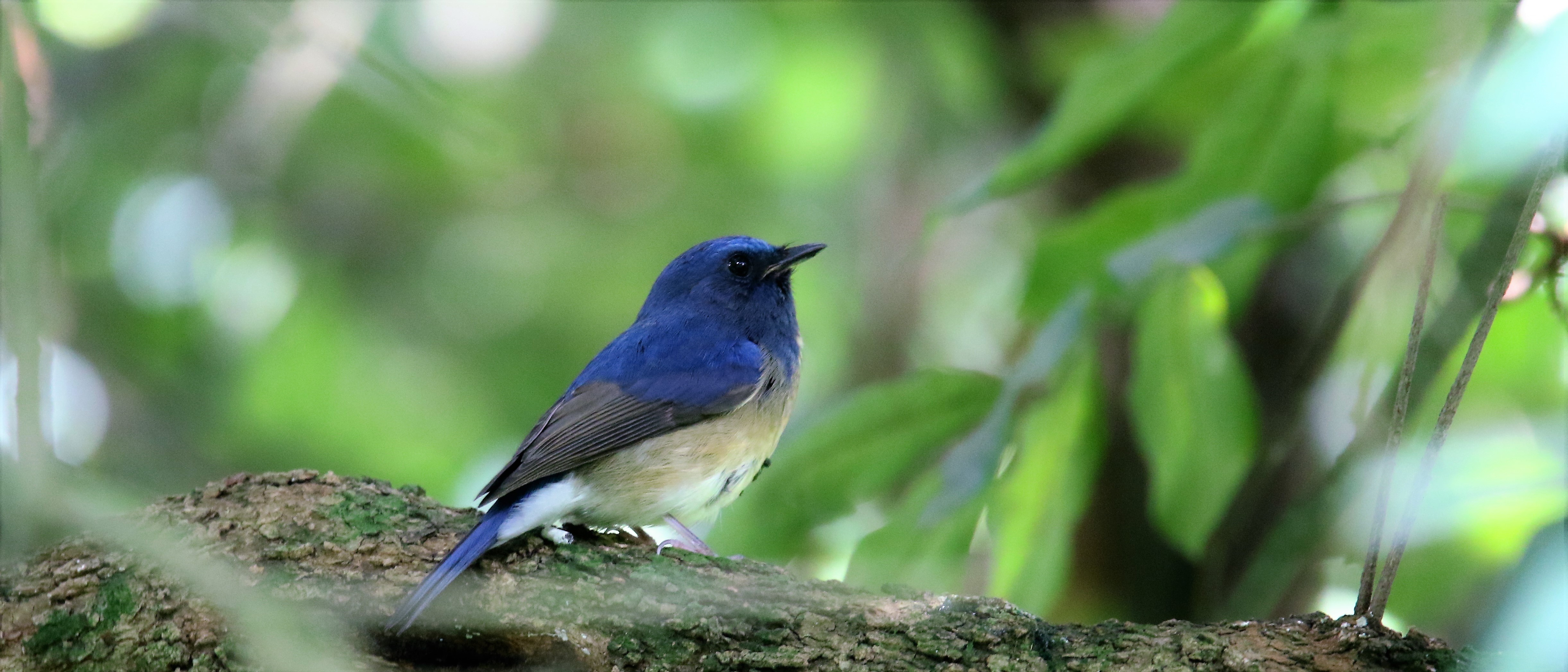
Male Hainan blue flycatcher

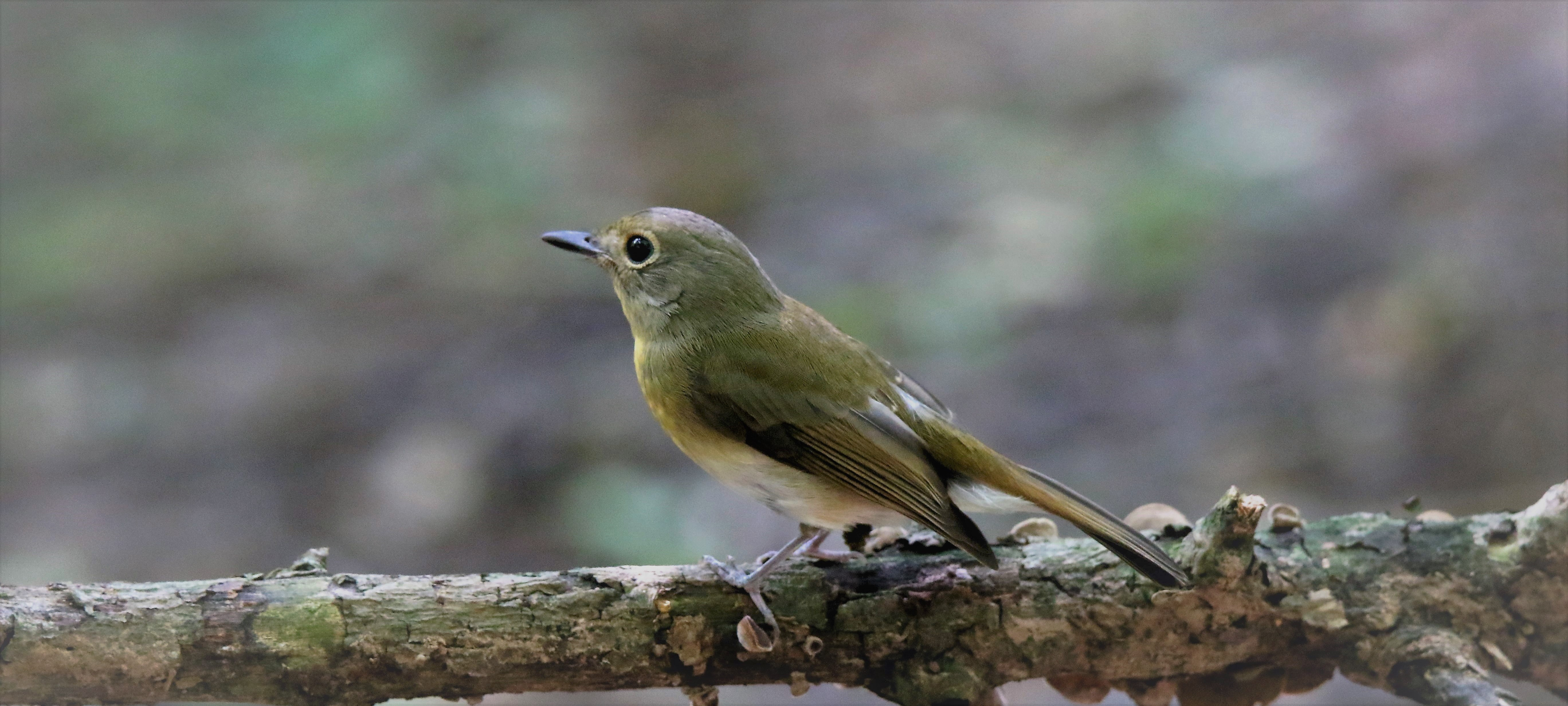
Female Hainan blue flycatcher
