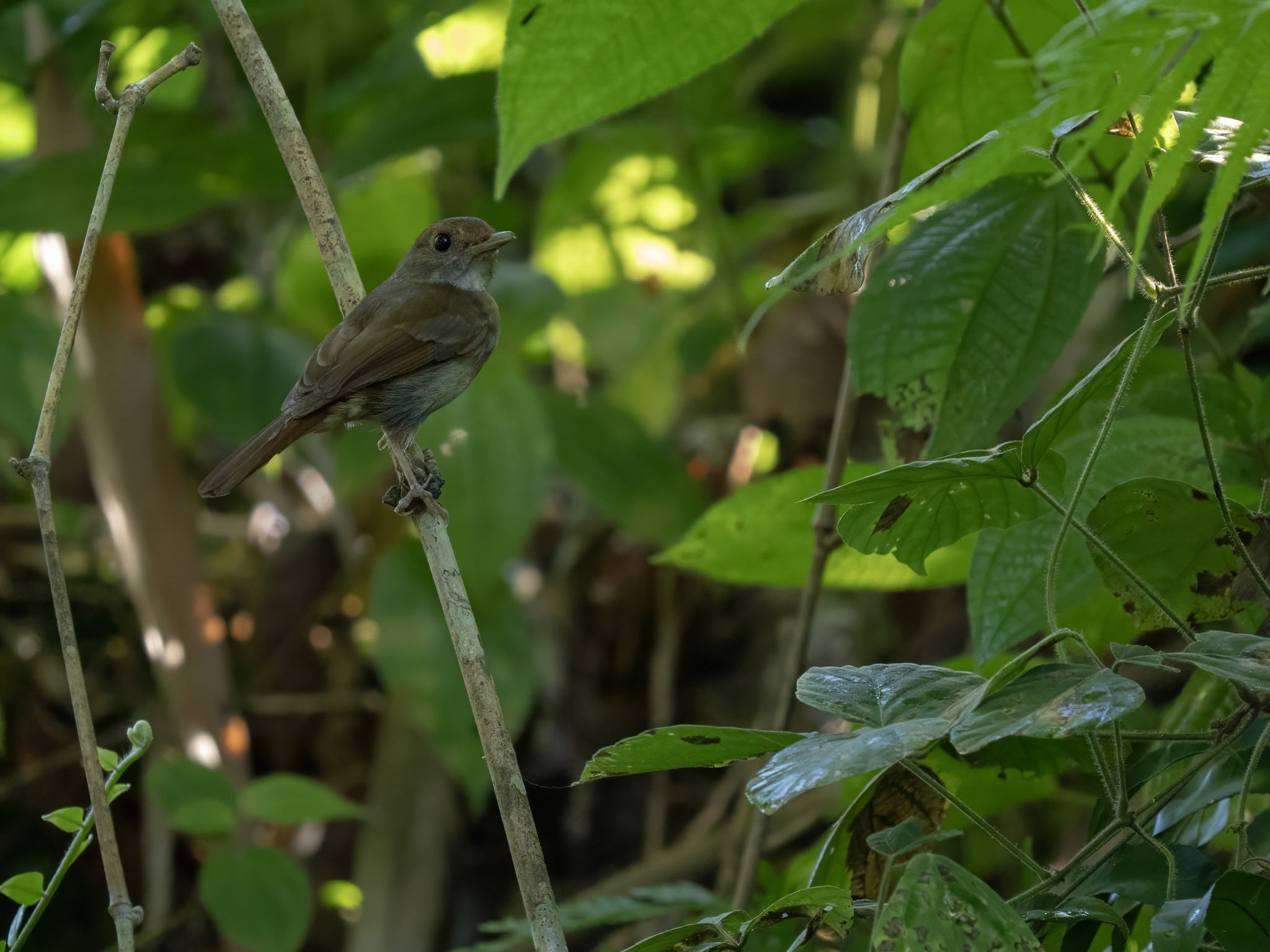

Conservation status
- Near Threatened (IUCN 3.1)

Scientific classification
- Kingdom: Animalia
- Phylum: Chordata
- Class: Aves
- Order: Passeriformes
- Family: Muscicapidae
- Genus: Cyornis
- Species: C. colonus

Binomial name
- Cyornis colonus (Hartert, 1898)

Synonyms
- Rhinomyias colonus

= Sula jungle flycatcher =

Species of bird

The Sula jungle flycatcher (Cyornis colonus) is a species of passerine bird in the Old World flycatcher family Muscicapidae. It is endemic to Sula Island in Indonesia where its natural habitat is subtropical or tropical moist lowland forests. It is threatened by habitat loss.

This species was previously placed in the genus Rhinomyias but was moved to Cyornis based on the results of a 2010 molecular phylogenetic study.
