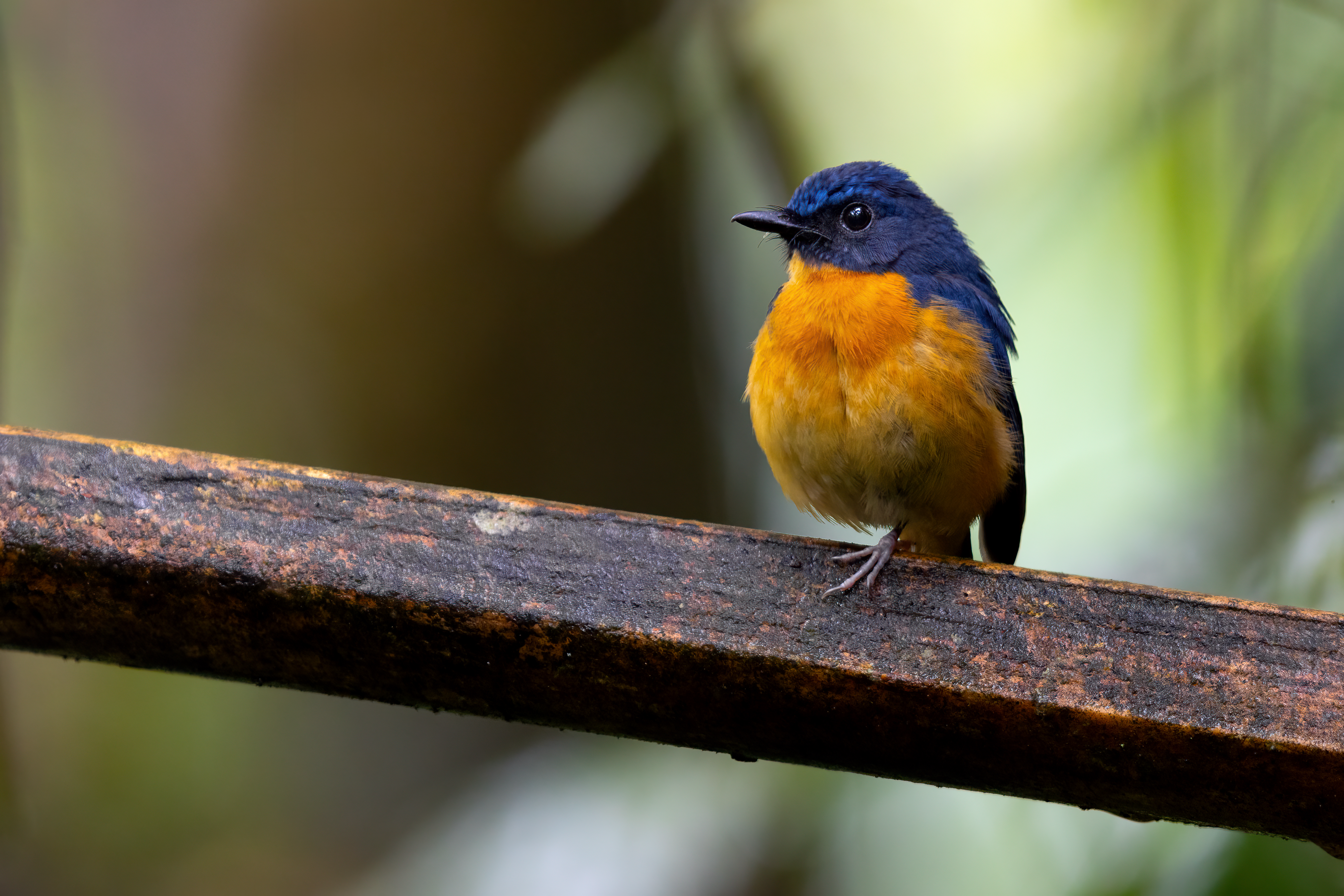

Conservation status
- Least Concern (IUCN 3.1)

Scientific classification
- Kingdom: Animalia
- Phylum: Chordata
- Class: Aves
- Order: Passeriformes
- Family: Muscicapidae
- Genus: Cyornis
- Species: C. omissus

Binomial name
- Cyornis omissus (Hartert, EJO, 1896)

= Sulawesi blue flycatcher =

Species of bird

The Sulawesi blue flycatcher (Cyornis omissus) is a species of bird in the family Muscicapidae. It is endemic to Indonesia. Its natural habitats are subtropical or tropical moist lowland forests and subtropical or tropical moist montane forests.

Four subspecies are recognised:

- C. o. omissus (Hartert, EJO, 1896) – montane Sulawesi
- C. o. omississimus Rheindt, Prawiradilaga, Ashari & Suparno & Gwee, 2020 – Togian Islands (between northeast and central east Sulawesi)
- C. o. peromissus Hartert, EJO, 1920 – Salayar (south of Sulawesi)
- C. o. djampeanus (Hartert, EJO, 1896) – Tanahjampea (south of Sulawesi)

The subspecies C. o. djampeanus is sometimes recognised as a separate species, the Tanahjampea blue flycatcher.
