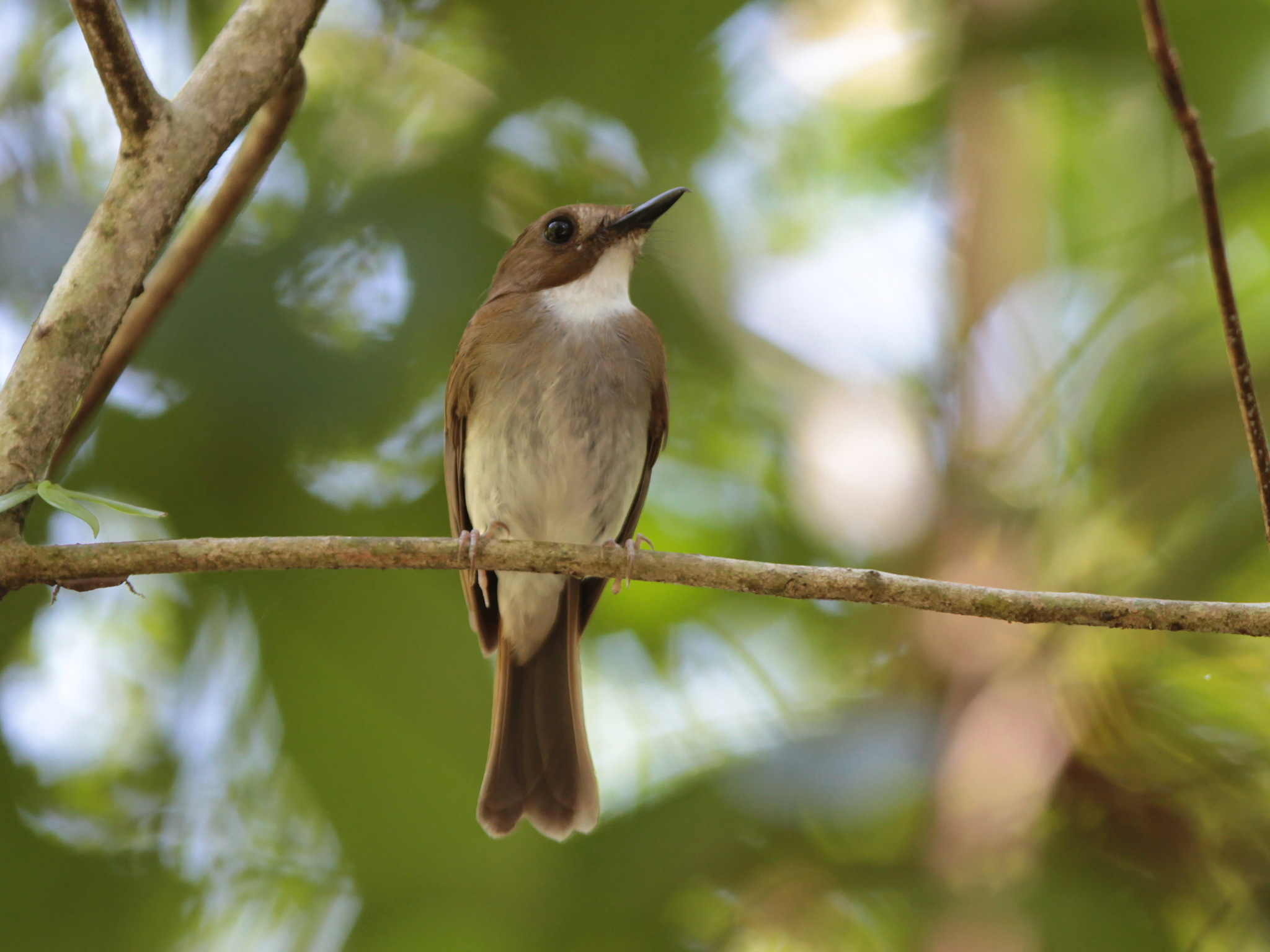

Conservation status
- Near Threatened (IUCN 3.1)

Scientific classification
- Kingdom: Animalia
- Phylum: Chordata
- Class: Aves
- Order: Passeriformes
- Family: Muscicapidae
- Genus: Cyornis
- Species: C. umbratilis

Binomial name
- Cyornis umbratilis (Strickland, 1849)

Synonyms
- Muscicapa infuscata Blyth, 1870

= Grey-chested jungle flycatcher =

Species of bird

The grey-chested jungle flycatcher (Cyornis umbratilis) is a species of bird in the Old World flycatcher family Muscicapidae. It is found in Brunei, Indonesia, Malaysia, and Thailand. Its natural habitats are subtropical or tropical moist lowland forests and subtropical or tropical swamps. It is threatened by habitat loss.

This species was previously placed in the genus Rhinomyias but was moved to Cyornis based on the results of a 2010 molecular phylogenetic study.
