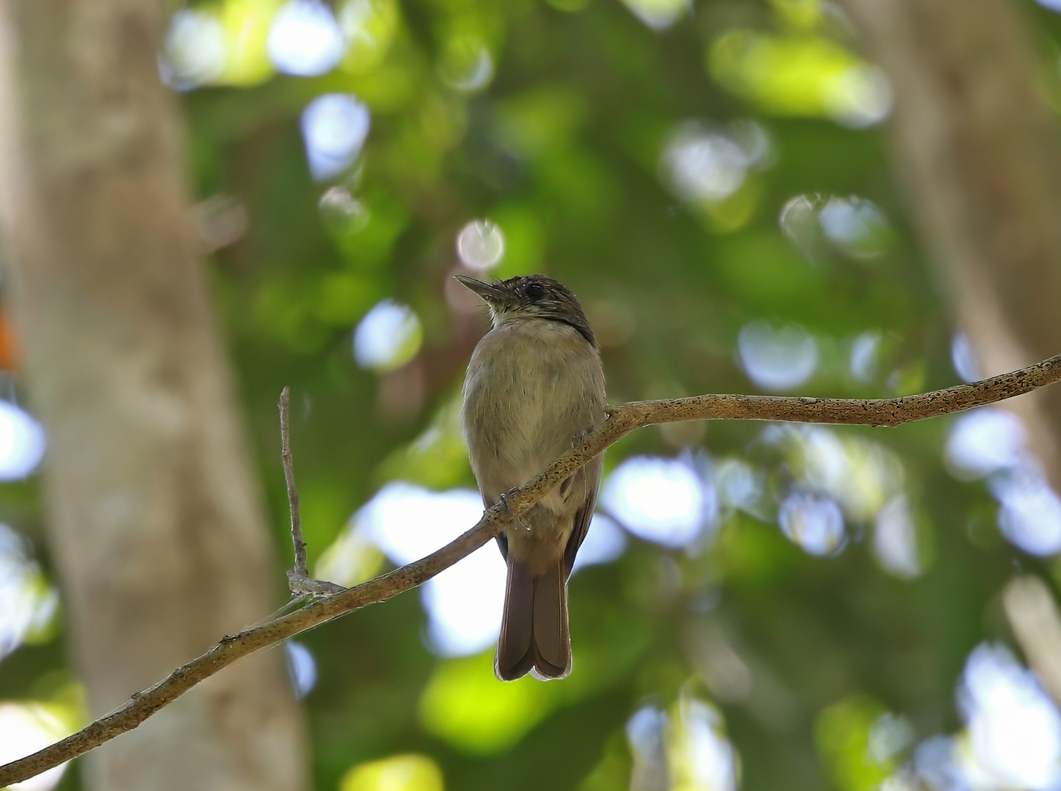

Scientific classification
- Kingdom: Animalia
- Phylum: Chordata
- Class: Aves
- Order: Passeriformes
- Family: Muscicapidae
- Genus: Cyornis
- Species: C. pelingensis

Binomial name
- Cyornis pelingensis (Vaurie, 1952)

Synonyms
- Rhinomyias pelingensis

= Banggai jungle flycatcher =

Species of bird

The Banggai jungle flycatcher (Cyornis pelingensis) is a species of passerine bird in the Old World flycatcher family Muscicapidae. It is endemic to Peleng in Indonesia where its natural habitat is subtropical or tropical moist lowland forests.
