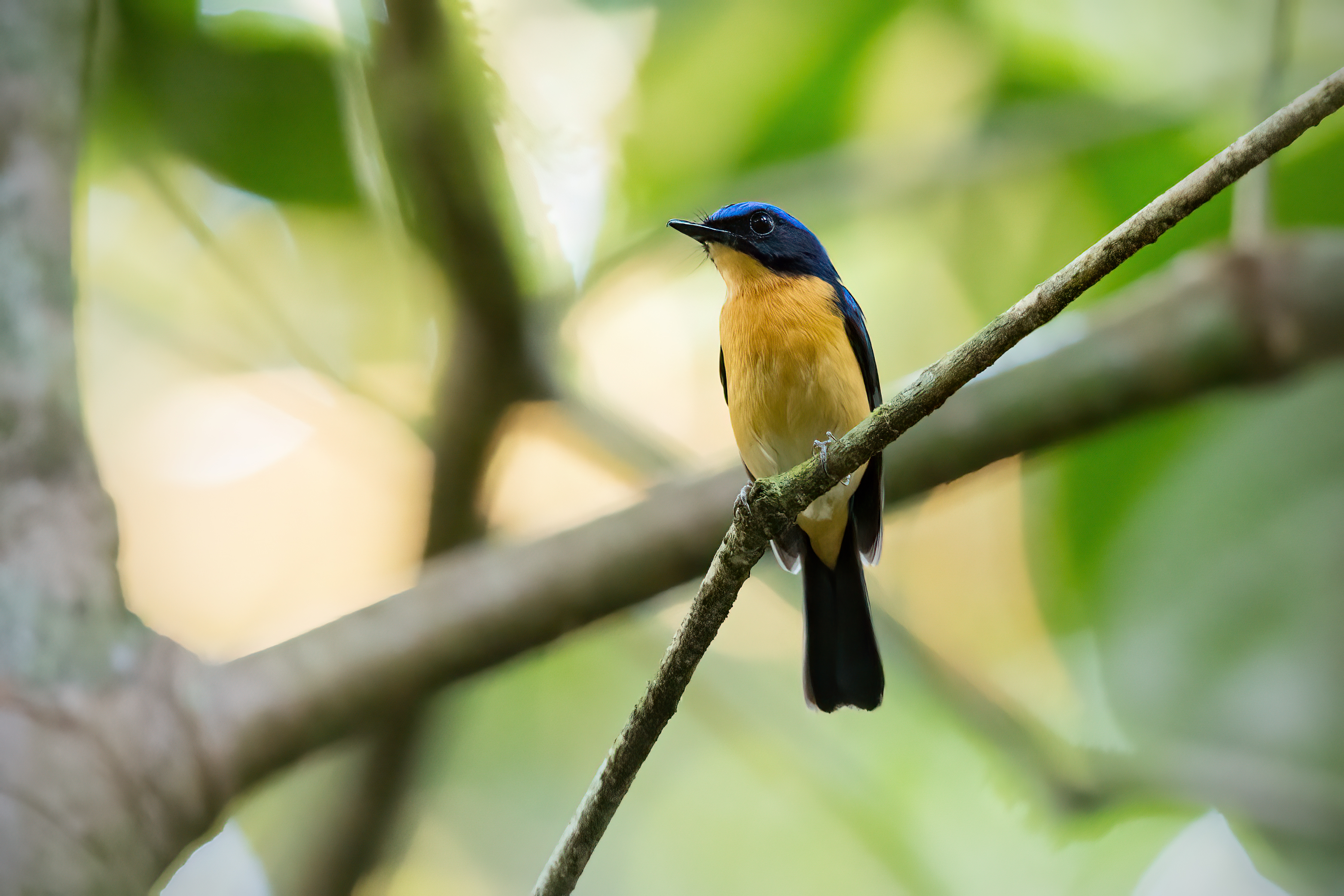

Conservation status
- Least Concern (IUCN 3.1)

Scientific classification
- Kingdom: Animalia
- Phylum: Chordata
- Class: Aves
- Order: Passeriformes
- Family: Muscicapidae
- Genus: Cyornis
- Species: C. superbus

Binomial name
- Cyornis superbus Stresemann, 1925

= Bornean blue flycatcher =

Species of bird

The Bornean blue flycatcher (Cyornis superbus) is a species of bird in the family Muscicapidae. It is found in Brunei, Indonesia, and Malaysia, where it is endemic to the island of Borneo. Its natural habitat is subtropical or tropical moist montane forests.
