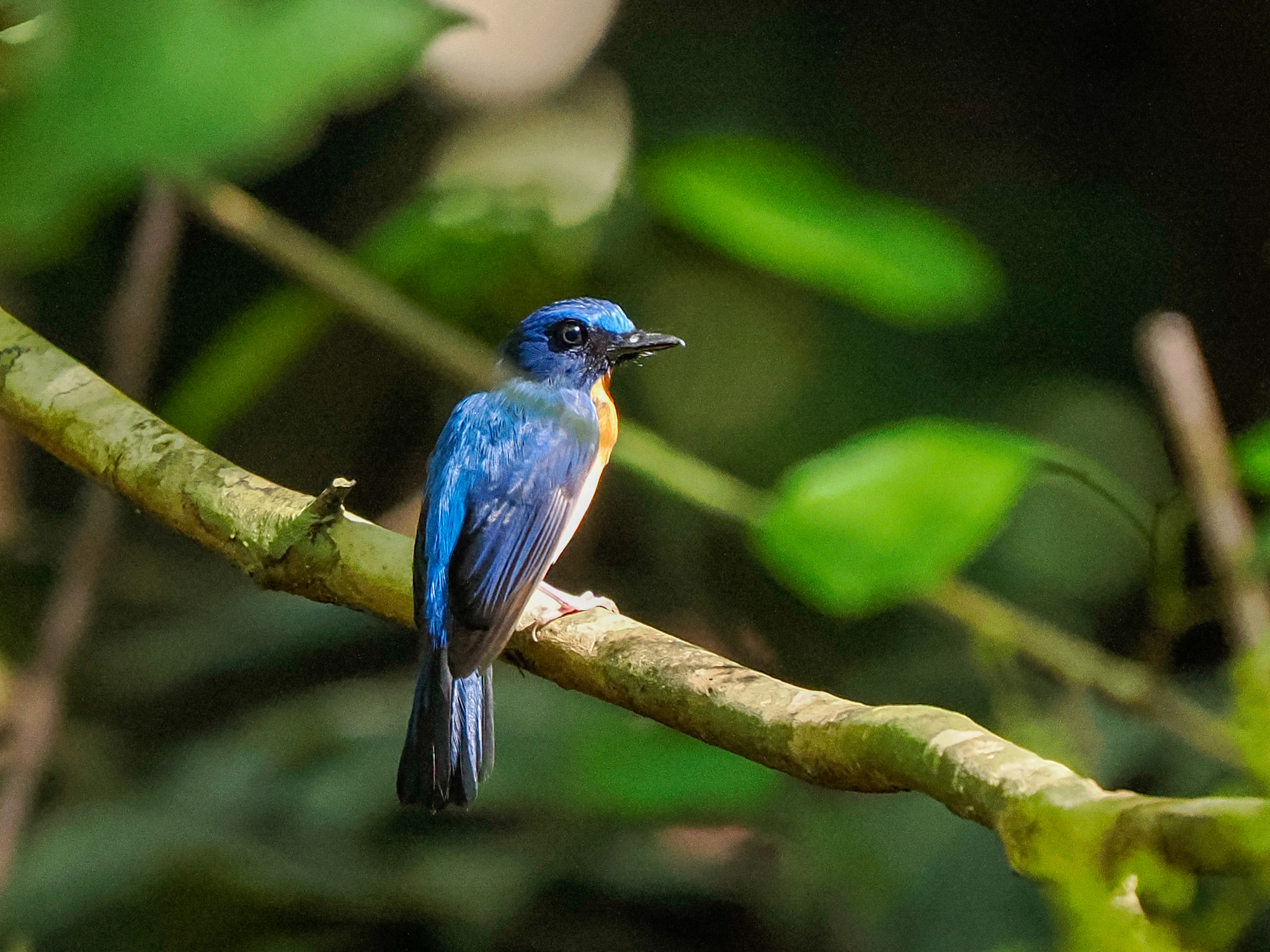

Conservation status
- Vulnerable (IUCN 3.1)

Scientific classification
- Kingdom: Animalia
- Phylum: Chordata
- Class: Aves
- Order: Passeriformes
- Family: Muscicapidae
- Genus: Cyornis
- Species: C. caerulatus

Binomial name
- Cyornis caerulatus (Bonaparte, 1857)

= Sunda blue flycatcher =

Species of bird

The Sunda blue flycatcher (Cyornis caerulatus), also known as the large-billed blue-flycatcher, is a species of bird in the family Muscicapidae. It is found in Sumatra and Borneo. Its natural habitat is subtropical or tropical moist lowland forests. It is threatened by habitat loss.
