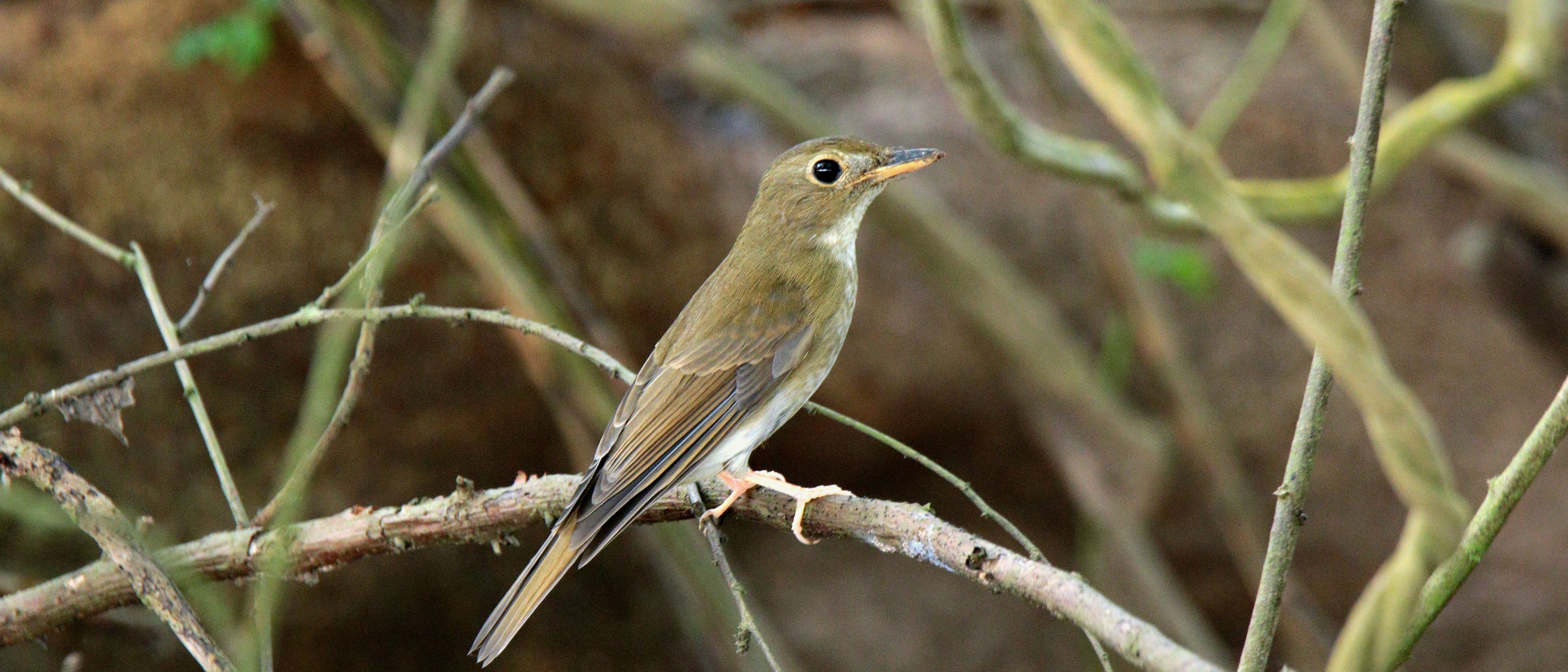

Conservation status
- Vulnerable (IUCN 3.1)

Scientific classification
- Kingdom: Animalia
- Phylum: Chordata
- Class: Aves
- Order: Passeriformes
- Family: Muscicapidae
- Genus: Cyornis
- Species: C. brunneatus

Binomial name
- Cyornis brunneatus (Slater, HH, 1897)

Synonyms
- Rhinomyias brunneatus

= Brown-chested jungle flycatcher =

Species of bird

The brown-chested jungle flycatcher (Cyornis brunneatus) is a species of bird in the Old World flycatcher family Muscicapidae. It breeds in South China and winters in the Malay Peninsula. Its natural habitats are subtropical or tropical moist lowland forests and subtropical or tropical mangrove forests. It is threatened by habitat loss.

== Taxonomy ==
This species was previously placed in the genus Rhinomyias but was moved to Cyornis based on the results of a 2010 molecular phylogenetic study. The Nicobar jungle flycatcher was until recently considered to be a subspecies of this species.

== Description ==
The brown-chested jungle flycatcher is a medium-large flycatcher that reaches an average length of 15 cm (5.9 in) and has an average mass of 14.3–21.8 g (0.50–0.77 oz). Adults are largely brownish in colour, albeit with large amounts of white below. The breast and flanks are light brown, while the rest of the underparts, including the chin and throat, are white. The eye is surrounded by a light buff orbital ring. The wings are short. The undertail coverts are buff to peach. The long, hook-tipped bill is bicoloured, black above and yellowish below. The legs are pink. Females are similar to males, but smaller in size, while juveniles can be distinguished from adults by their scaly-looking upperparts and their dark-tipped bills.

== Distribution and habitat ==
The brown-chested jungle flycatcher is a native of China and Southeast Asia, spending the breeding season in southeastern China before shifting to the Malay Peninsula and Sumatra for the non-breeding season. It may also winter in Borneo and Java. It is seen as a passage migrant in parts of China, Thailand, and the Malay Peninsula. As winter migrants, these flycatchers travel south from the middle of September to November, and remain in their wintering range until April.

Brown-chested jungle flycatchers are inhabitants of lowland rainforests, deciduous forests, mangroves, bamboo thickets, scrubland, and even gardens in their range. It largely prefers lowlands, being found at elevations of 600–1,600 m (2,000–5,200 ft) while breeding in China and usually below 250 m (820 ft) when wintering in the Malay Peninsula, but can be found as high as 2,000 m (6,600 ft) while migrating.
