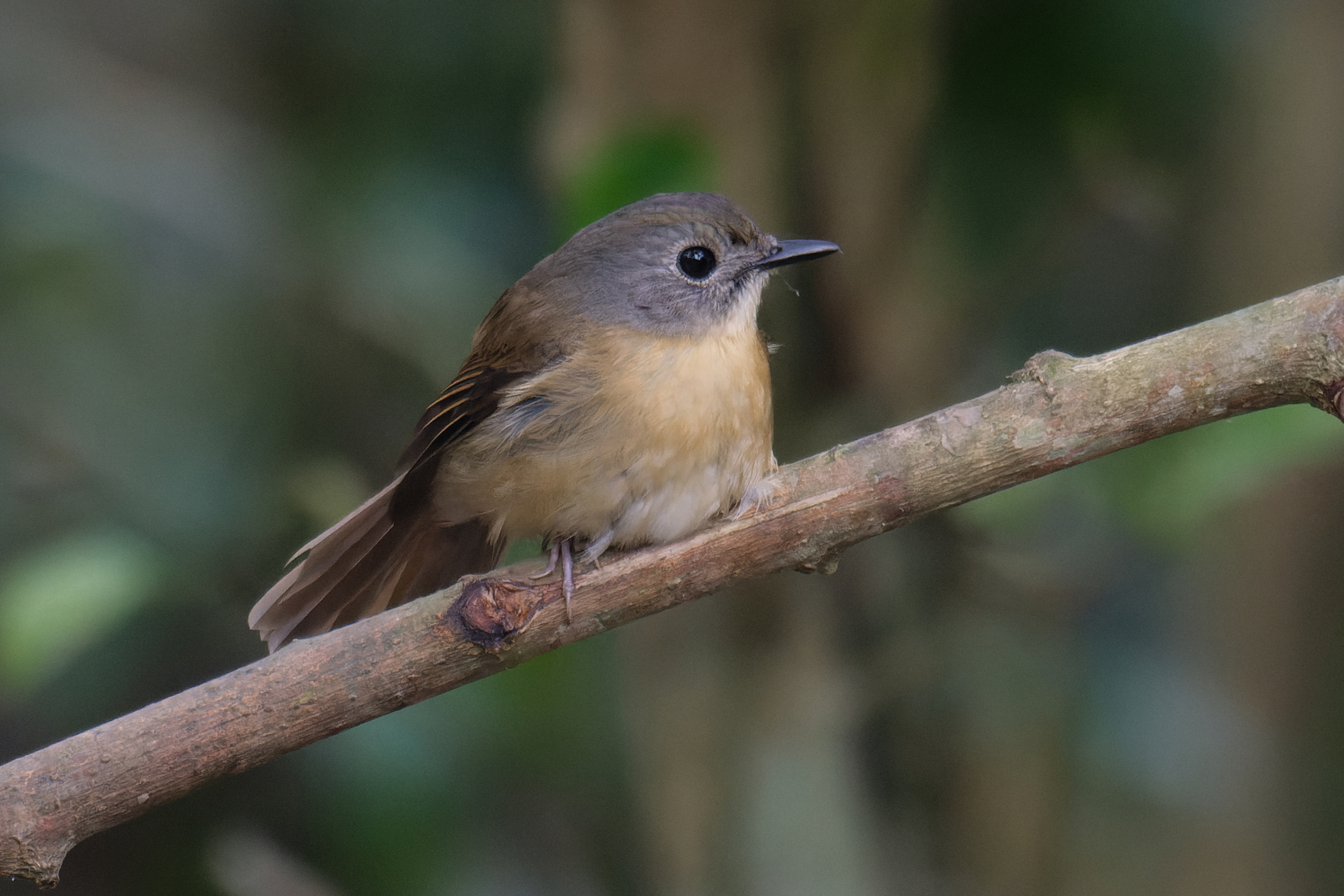
- Nominate Cyornis poliogenys poliogenys at Buxa Tiger Reserve, West Bengal

Conservation status
- Least Concern (IUCN 3.1)

Scientific classification
- Kingdom: Animalia
- Phylum: Chordata
- Class: Aves
- Order: Passeriformes
- Family: Muscicapidae
- Genus: Cyornis
- Species: C. poliogenys

Binomial name
- Cyornis poliogenys Brooks, 1880

= Pale-chinned flycatcher =

Species of bird

The pale-chinned flycatcher (Cyornis poliogenys) is a species of bird in the family Muscicapidae. It has also been known in the past as pale-chinned blue flycatcher (on the IOC World Bird List up to 2023), and Brook's flycatcher.

It is a medium-sized flycatcher, 15.5–18 cm (6.1–7.1 in) long. Both sexes are similar, dull bluish-grey on upper parts, and with a rufous chest, a whitish throat, and white below; the males lack the intense blue colours shown by many of the other mainland Asian species in the genus Cyornis.

Its nesting season is April–June. It is insectivorous.

== Distribution and taxonomy ==
It is found in Bangladesh, Bhutan, China, India, Myanmar, and Nepal. Its natural habitat is subtropical or tropical moist lowland forests. It occurs at altitudes from sea level up to 1,600 metres.

There are four subspecies:

- C. p. poliogenys – central Himalaya to eastern Bangladesh and southwestern Myanmar.
- C. p. cachariensis – eastern Himalaya to south-central China and northern Myanmar.
- C. p. laurentei – Yunnan, southern China.
- C. p. vernayi – eastern India in the Eastern Ghats. Differs from the nominate in being more strongly bluish above and orangey below.
