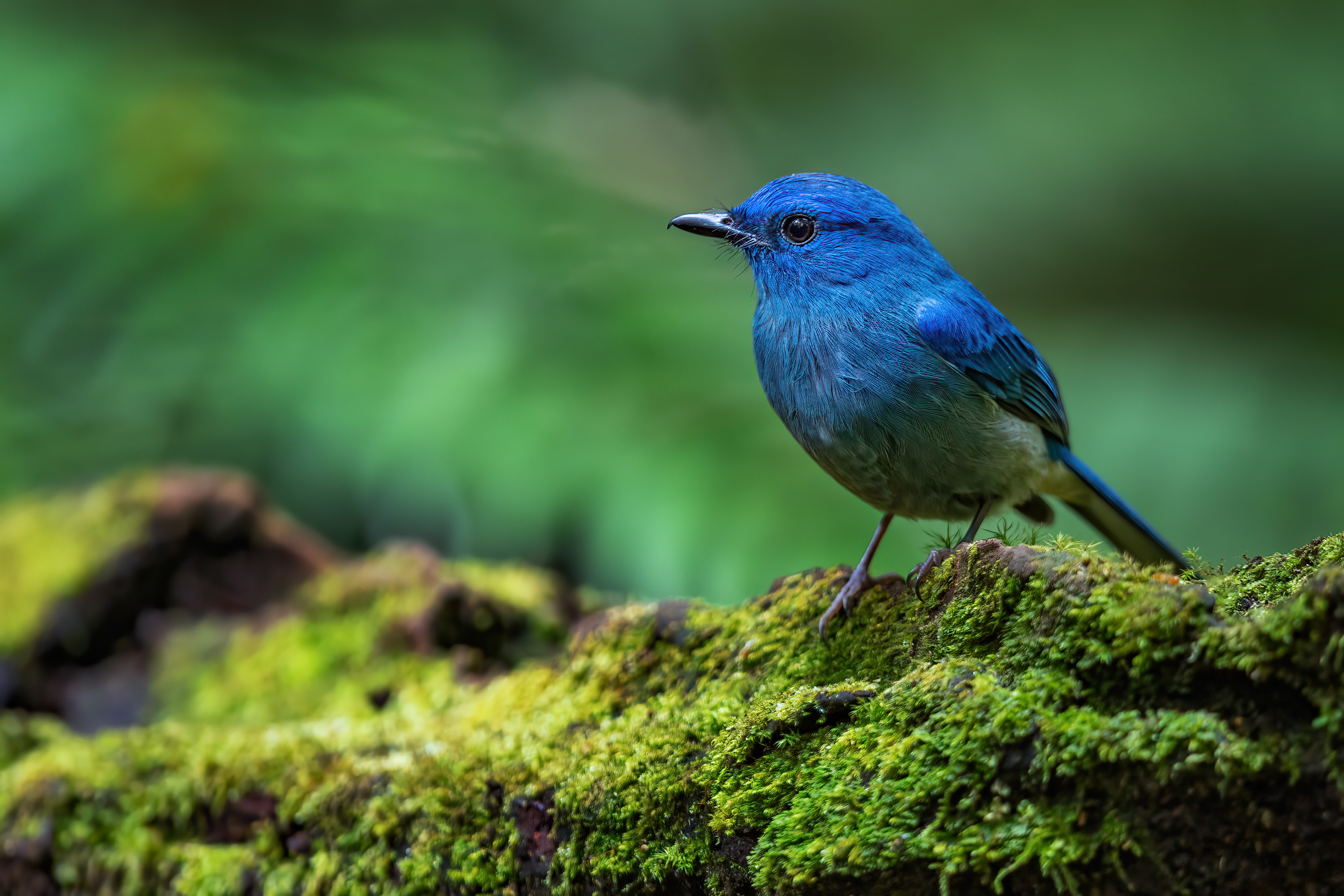
- A male pale blue flycatcher In East Java, Indonesia
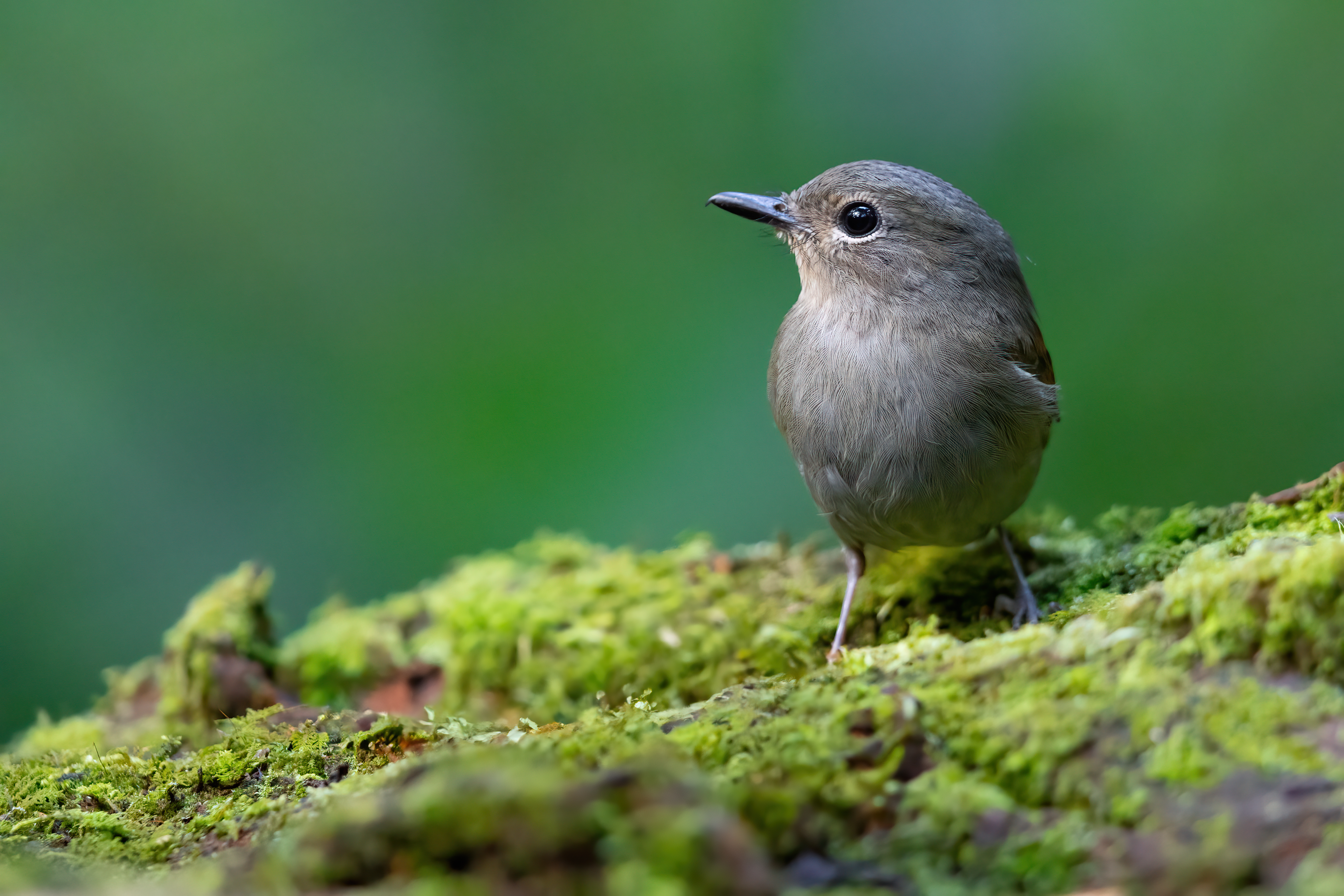
- A female pale blue flycatcher In East Java, Indonesia

Conservation status
- Least Concern (IUCN 3.1)

Scientific classification
- Kingdom: Animalia
- Phylum: Chordata
- Class: Aves
- Order: Passeriformes
- Family: Muscicapidae
- Genus: Cyornis
- Species: C. unicolor

Binomial name
- Cyornis unicolor Blyth, 1843

Synonyms
- Cyornis cyanopolia Blyth, 1870

= Pale blue flycatcher =

Species of bird

The pale blue flycatcher (Cyornis unicolor) is a bird in the family Muscicapidae. The species was first described by Edward Blyth in 1843.

It is found in Bangladesh, Bhutan, Brunei, Cambodia, China, Hong Kong, India, Indonesia, Laos, Malaysia, Myanmar, Nepal, Thailand, and Vietnam. Its natural habitats are subtropical or tropical moist lowland forest and subtropical or tropical moist montane forest.

It is superficially similar in appearance to the verditer flycatcher, but is paler blue, with greyish underparts from throat to vent, and a discontinuous black eye-patch. Both birds can often be found in the same locale.

== Gallery ==
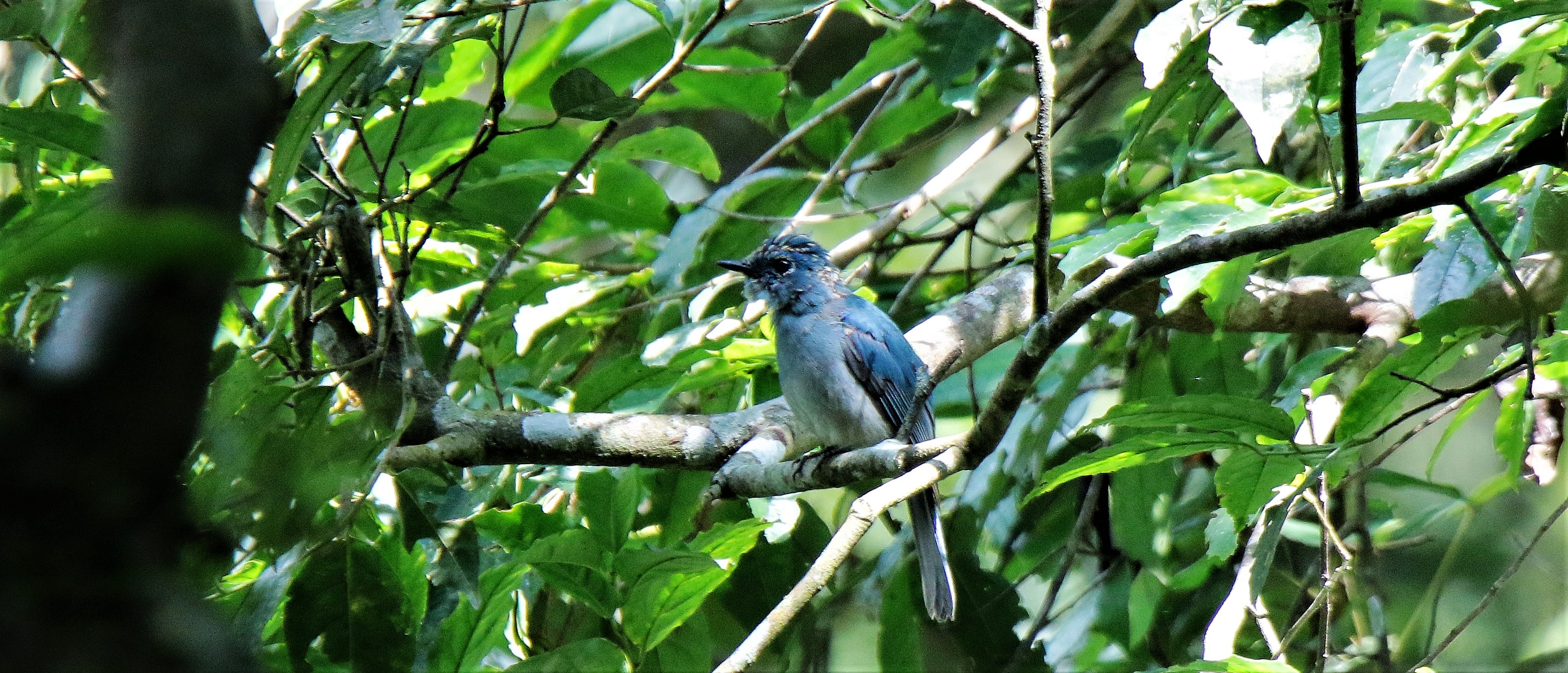
Male

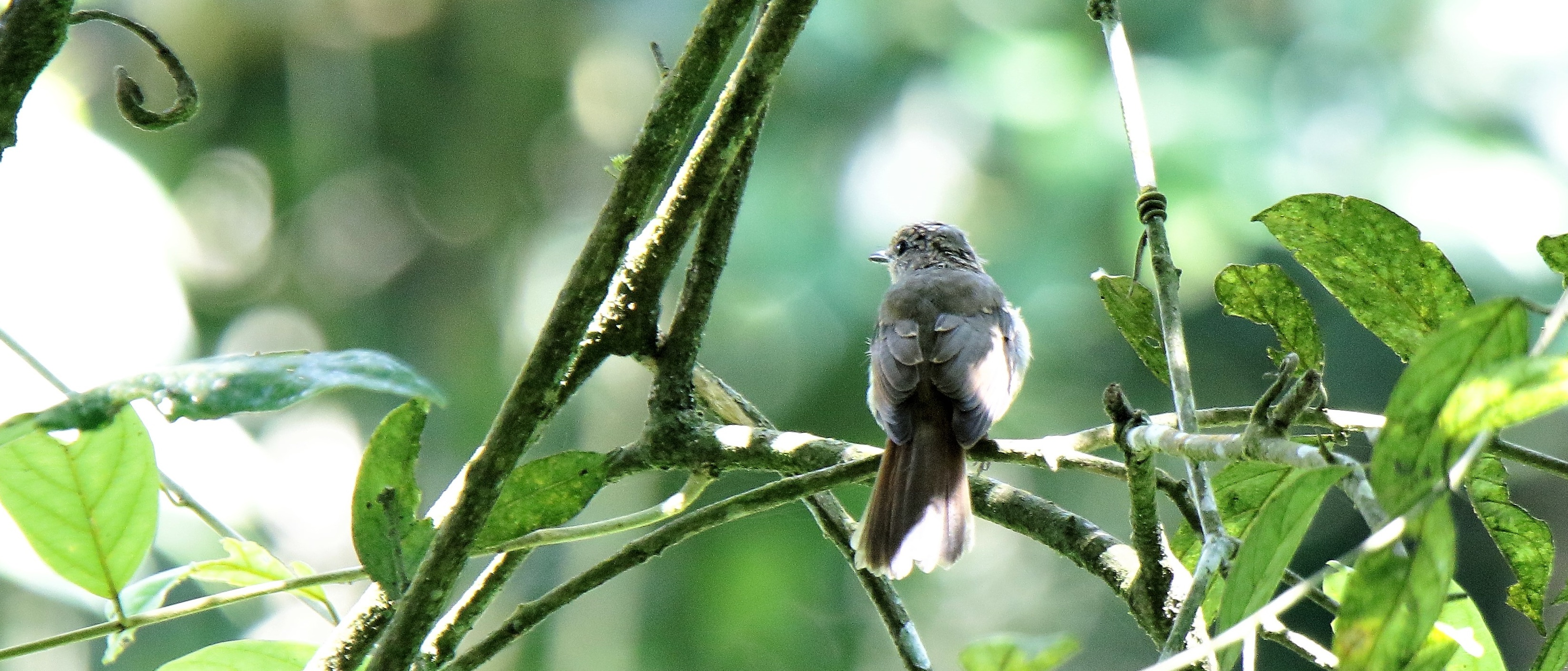
Female

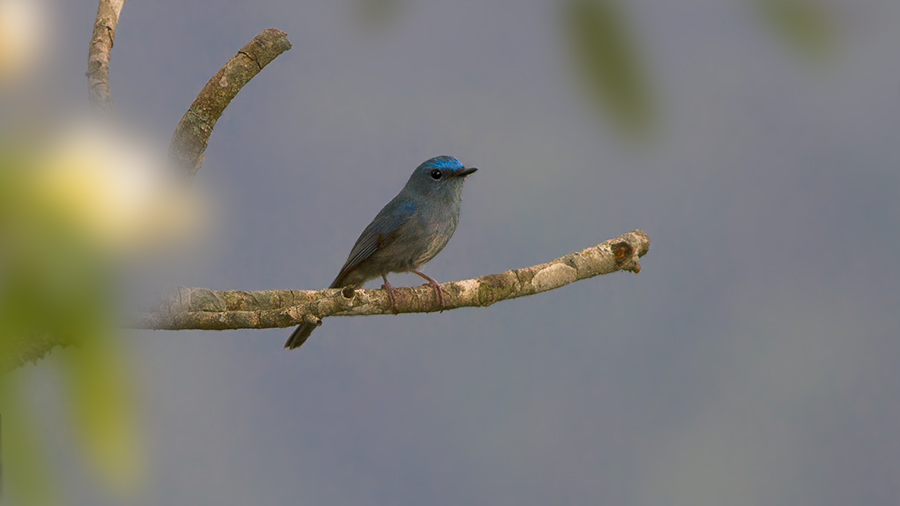
From Mahananda Wildlife Sanctuary, West Bengal

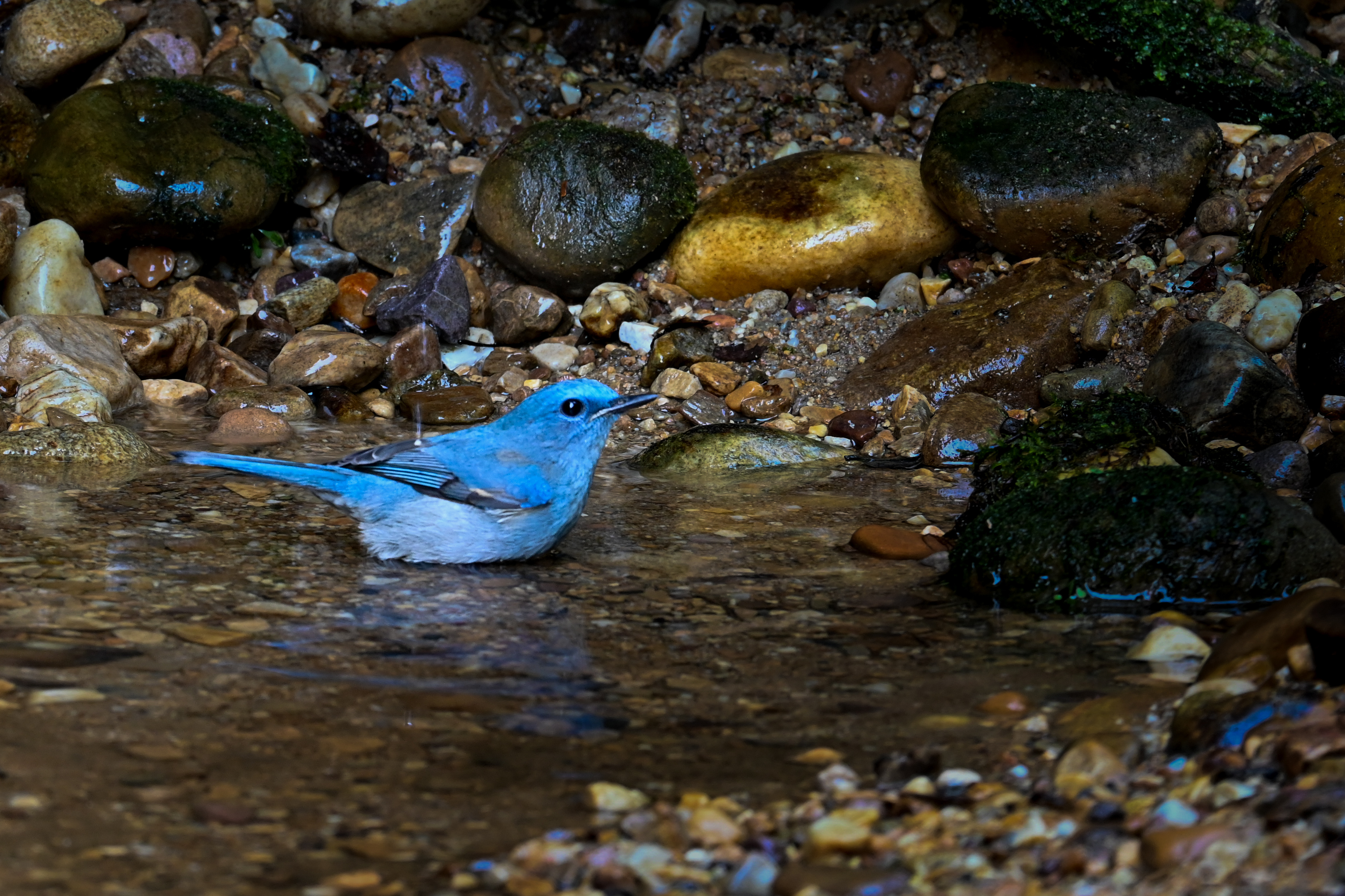
bathing Dulung Assam
