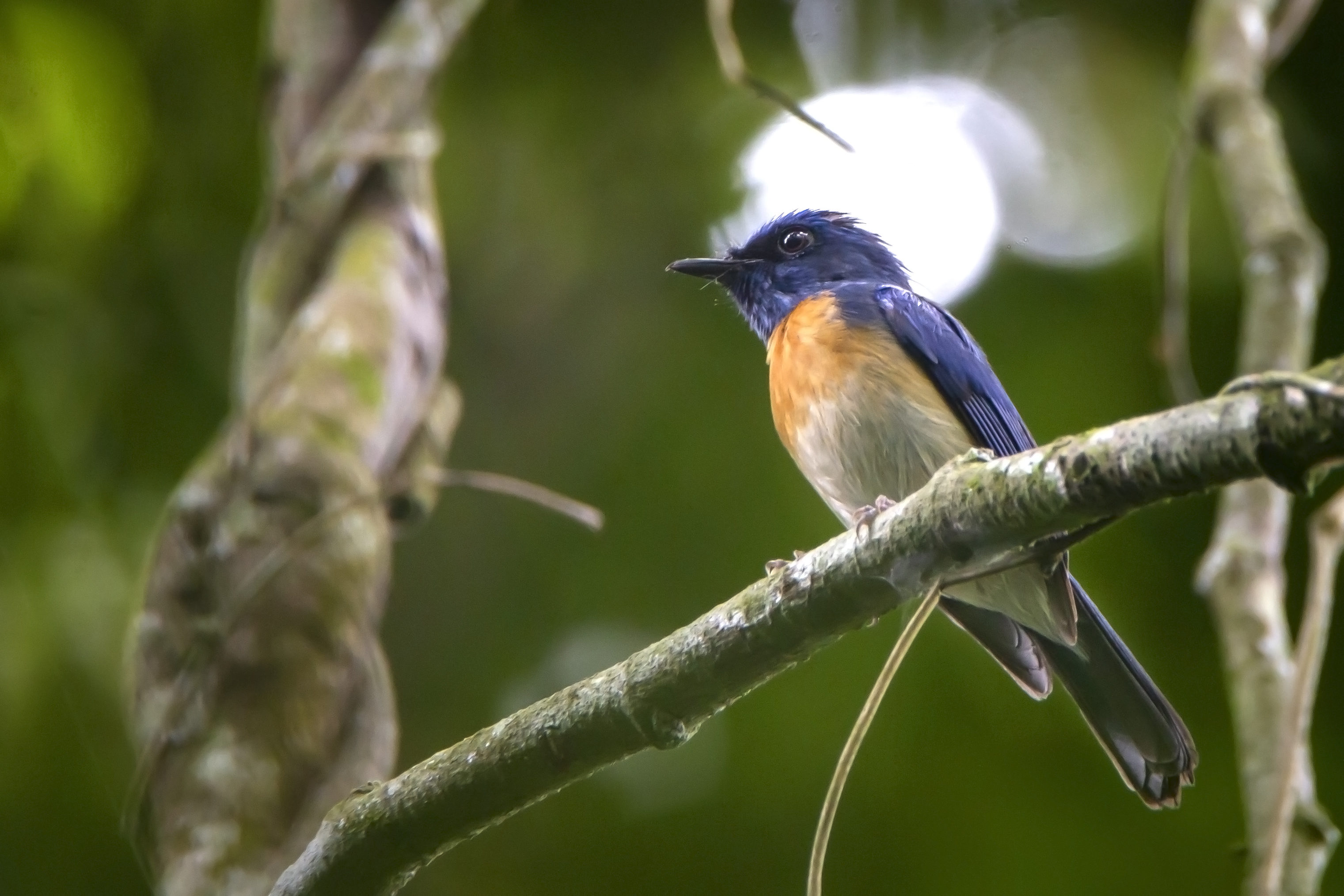

Conservation status
- Near Threatened (IUCN 3.1)

Scientific classification
- Kingdom: Animalia
- Phylum: Chordata
- Class: Aves
- Order: Passeriformes
- Family: Muscicapidae
- Genus: Cyornis
- Species: C. turcosus

Binomial name
- Cyornis turcosus Brüggemann, 1877

= Malayan blue flycatcher =

Species of bird

The Malayan blue flycatcher or Malaysian blue flycatcher (Cyornis turcosus) is a species of bird in the family Muscicapidae. It has a brilliant blue upperparts, a pale orange throat and chest, and a white belly. A slightly paler female has a whitish throat, while a male's is blue; the sexes are otherwise quite similar.

The head is fairly uniformly blue, without boldly lighter or darker patches, unlike in many other "blue flycatchers". Pale and restricted orange also serve as a helpful identifying feature. A lowland species, restricted to secluded riverine forests in Sumatra and the Malay Peninsula but found in a variety of dry and wet forests on Borneo.

Its natural habitat is subtropical or tropical moist lowland forests, found in Malaysia, Thailand, Indonesia and Brunei. It is threatened by habitat loss. The bird is well known as burung sambar biru in Malaysia.
