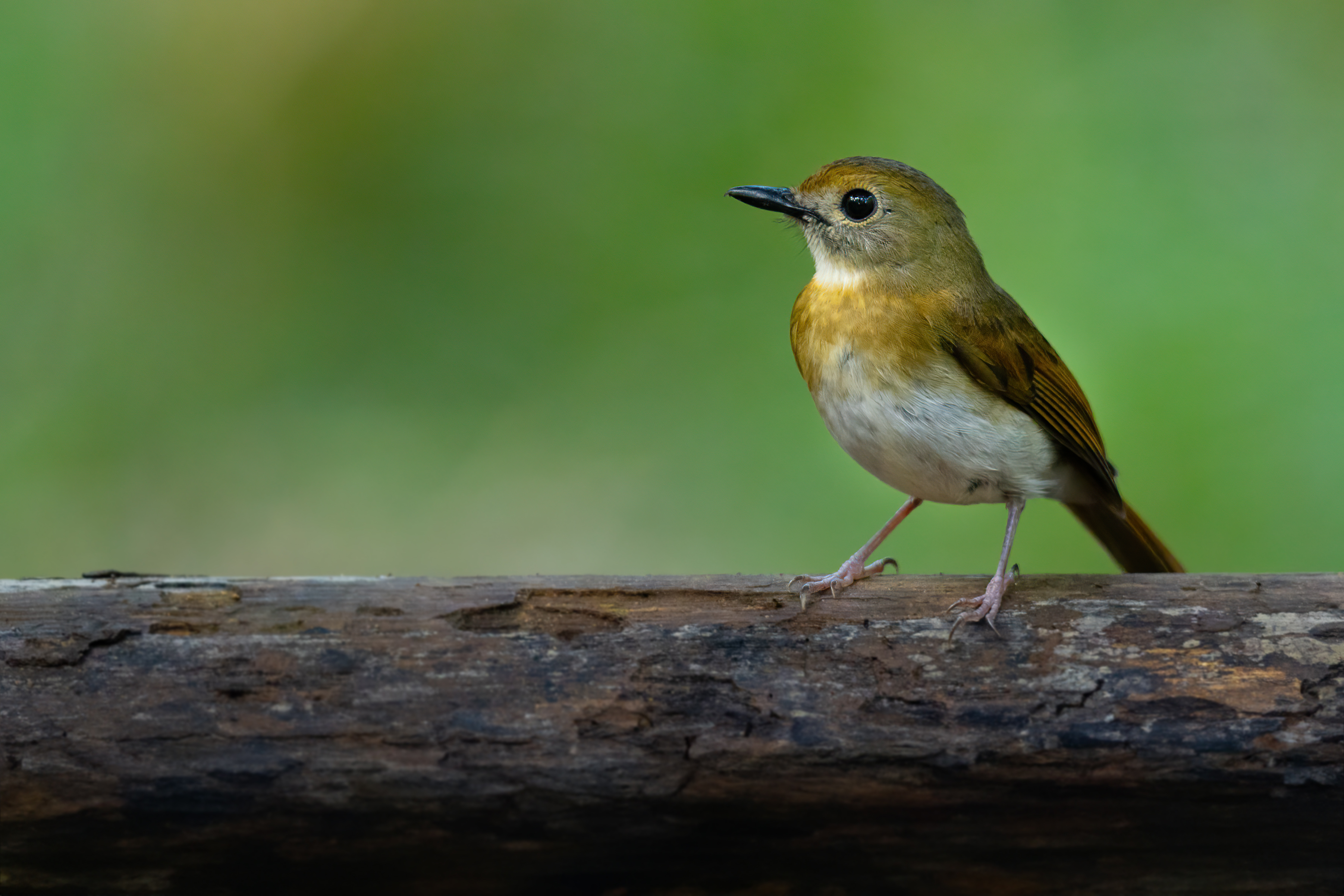

Conservation status
- Least Concern (IUCN 3.1)

Scientific classification
- Kingdom: Animalia
- Phylum: Chordata
- Class: Aves
- Order: Passeriformes
- Family: Muscicapidae
- Genus: Cyornis
- Species: C. olivaceus

Binomial name
- Cyornis olivaceus Hume, 1877

Synonyms
- Rhinomyias olivaceus

= Fulvous-chested jungle flycatcher =

Species of bird

The fulvous-chested jungle flycatcher (Cyornis olivaceus) is a species of bird in the Old World flycatcher family Muscicapidae. It is found in Brunei, Indonesia, Malaysia, Myanmar, and Thailand. Its natural habitat is subtropical or tropical moist lowland forests.

This species was previously placed in the genus Rhinomyias but was moved to Cyornis based on the results of a 2010 molecular phylogenetic study.
