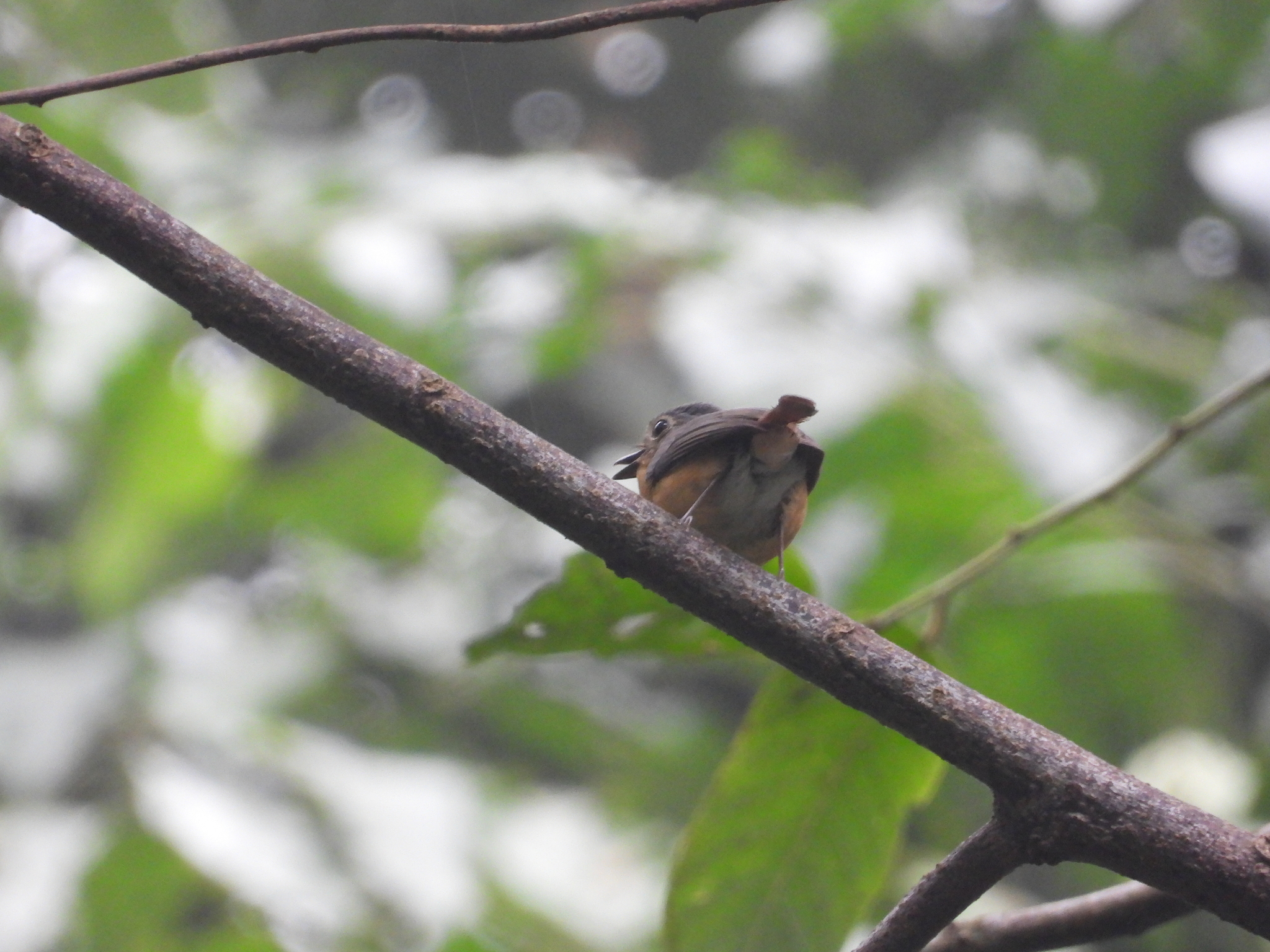

Conservation status
- Critically Endangered (IUCN 3.1)

Scientific classification
- Kingdom: Animalia
- Phylum: Chordata
- Class: Aves
- Order: Passeriformes
- Family: Muscicapidae
- Genus: Cyornis
- Species: C. banyumas

Binomial name
- Cyornis banyumas (Horsfield, 1821)

= Javan blue flycatcher =

Species of bird

The Javan blue flycatcher (Cyornis banyumas) is a species of bird in the family Muscicapidae. It is endemic to the Indonesian islands of Java and Panaitan. The Dayak blue flycatcher (Cyornis montanus) of Borneo, which was formerly considered conspecific, was split as a distinct species by the IOC in 2021.

It is typically solitary or spends time in pairs.
