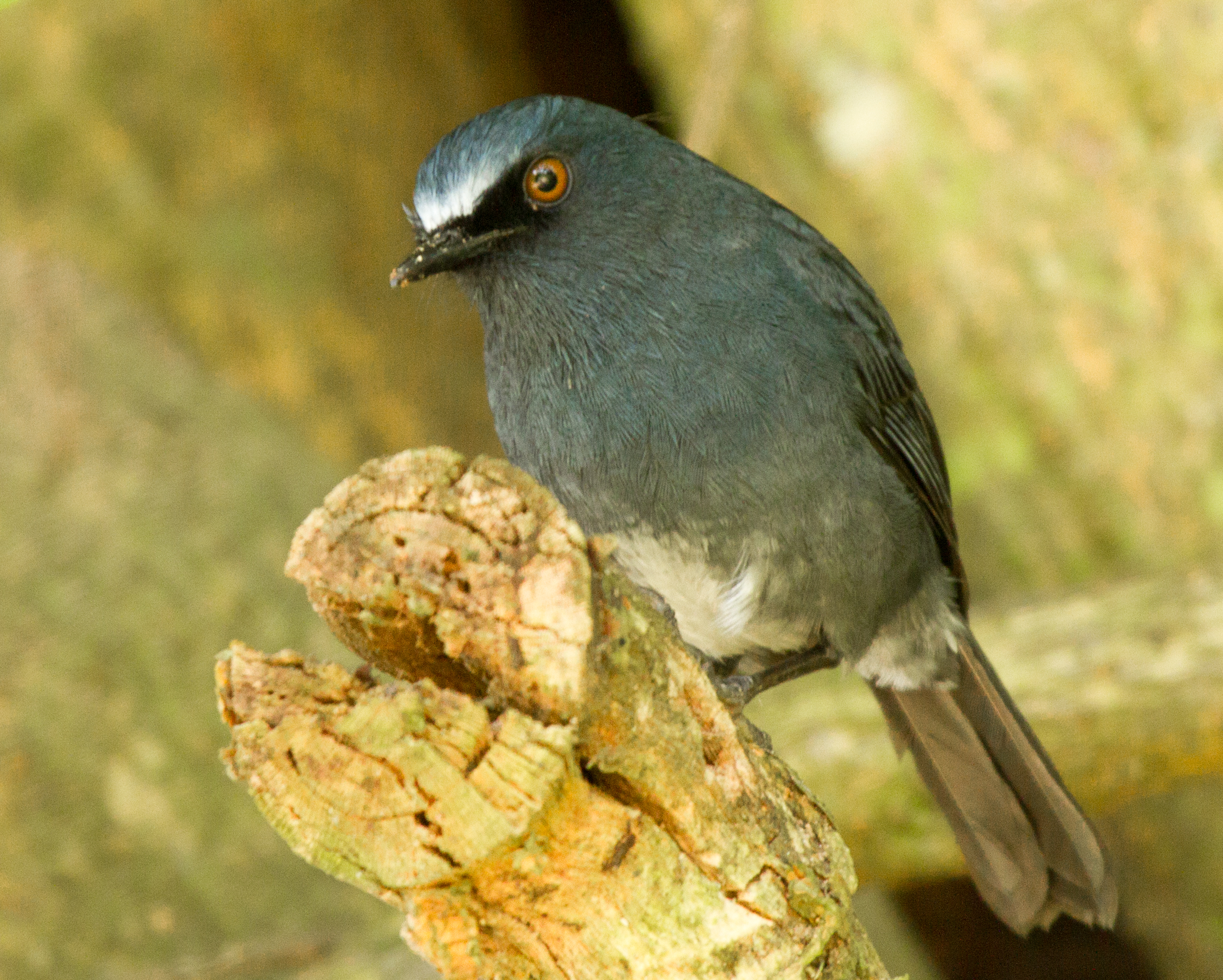

Conservation status
- Near Threatened (IUCN 3.1)

Scientific classification
- Kingdom: Animalia
- Phylum: Chordata
- Class: Aves
- Order: Passeriformes
- Family: Muscicapidae
- Genus: Sholicola
- Species: S. albiventris

Binomial name
- Sholicola albiventris (Blanford, 1868)

Synonyms
- Sholicola major albiventris

= White-bellied blue robin =

Species of bird

The white-bellied blue robin (Sholicola albiventris) or white-bellied sholakili, is a bird of the family Muscicapidae. It is endemic to the Shola forests of the higher hills of southern India. The Nilgiri blue robin and this species were once considered separate species, later lumped as sub-species of a single species (major) and elevated again to full species in 2005 by Pamela C. Rasmussen. The species was earlier thought to be related to the shortwings and placed in the genus Brachypteryx and later moved to Myiomela since species in the genus Brachypteryx show marked sexual dimorphism. In 2017, a study found that this is a sister group of the flycatchers in the genera Niltava, Cyornis and Eumyias among others. It was then placed in newly erected genus Sholicola. This small bird is found on the forest floor and undergrowth of dense forest patches sheltered in the valleys of montane grassland, a restricted and threatened habitat.

== Description ==
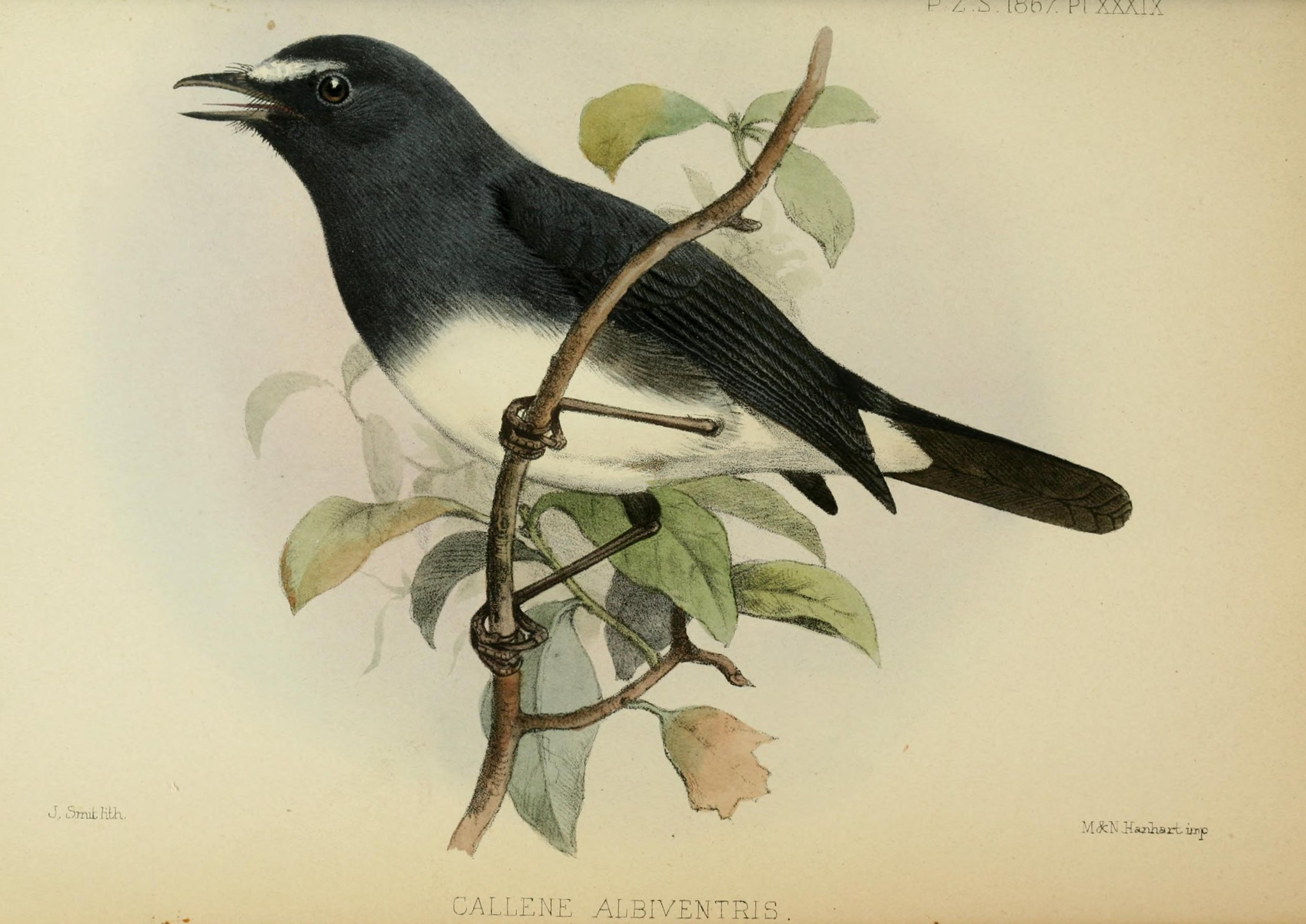
Illustration by Joseph Smit (1867)

This chat-like bird is long-legged and appears chunky with its short tail and wing. Although sharing similar habits and shape, the two species differ in plumage and both may show slight sexual dimorphism. Differences in iris colour between the females have been suggested for S. albiventris.

The white-bellied blue robin (S. albiventris) has a black face mask with a short whitish brow. The upperside and breast are slaty blue grading to grey on the flanks. The centre of the belly and vent is white. This can appear somewhat like the male of the syntopic white-bellied blue flycatcher (Cyornis pallipes) but can be distinguished by behaviour apart from the longer legs and greyer colouration. Although the plumage is identical between males and females, males are slightly longer winged and have longer tarsi.

== Taxonomy and systematics ==
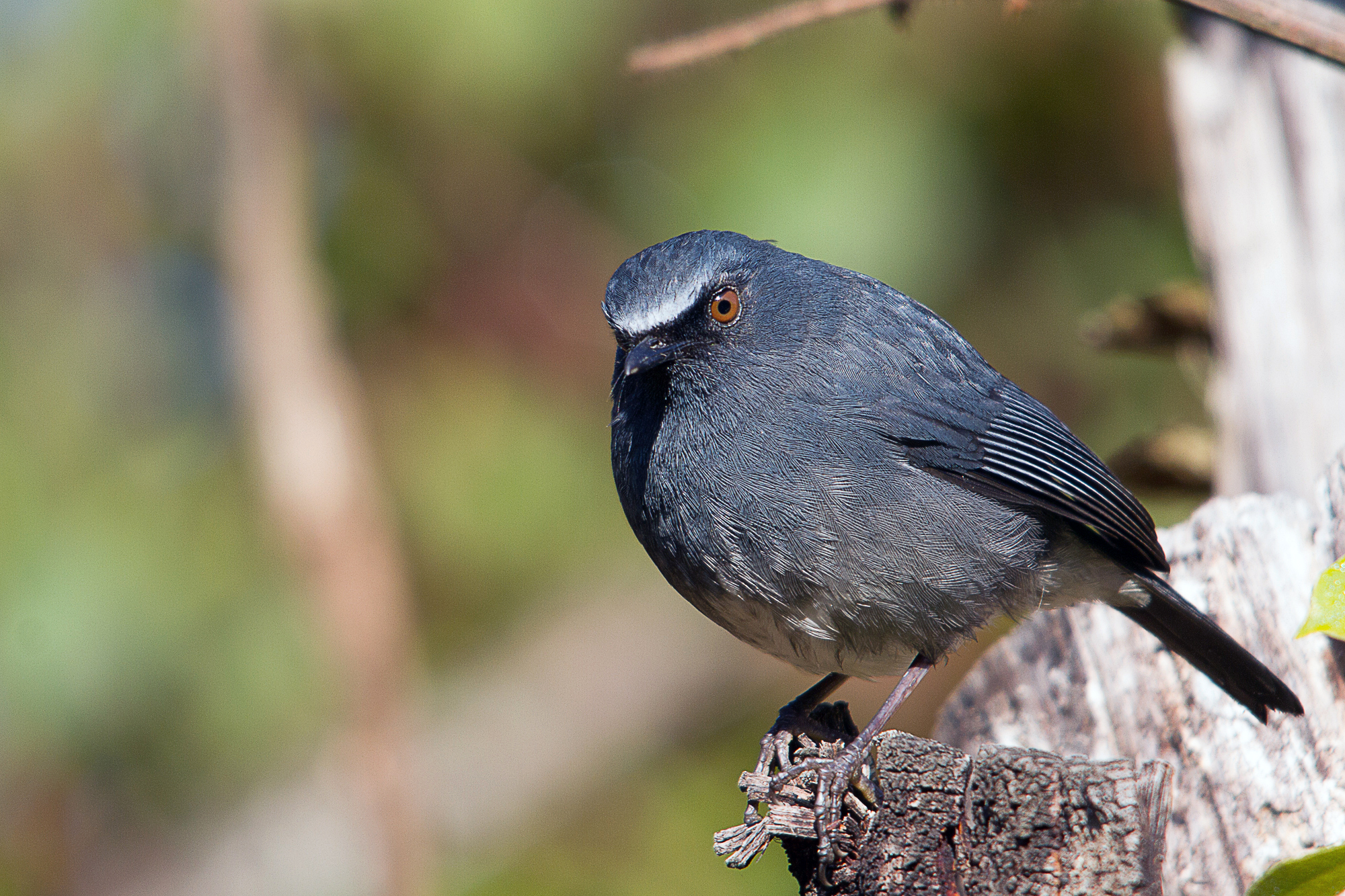
In Pampadum Shola National Park, Munnar, Kerala, India

In 1867, W. T. Blanford described a new species Callene albiventris obtained by Rev. S. Fairbank from the Palni Hills. Blanford noted the similarity to the Nilgiri form while also noting the geographical isolation of the two forms and relation to species from northeastern India. Eugene Oates in the first edition of The Fauna of British India moved the species back into the genus Brachypteryx stating that they were congeneric with Brachypteryx cruralis while also noting that the young birds were speckled as in true-thrushes like Callene (as represented by the Blue-fronted Robin). Oates also used the name "White-bellied Short-wing". This genus placement was carried on in the second edition of The Fauna of British India (1924) by E. C. Stuart Baker but was demoted into a subspecies on the basis of a specimen collected by T. F. Bourdillon at Mynal which was claimed to be intermediate to the two forms. Claud Buchanan Ticehurst in 1939 reaffirmed the genus placement. This treatment as subspecies was carried forward by Salim Ali and Sidney Dillon Ripley in their "Handbook" until the old two species were restored by P. C. Rasmussen in 2005. In the Birds of South Asia (2005), however they moved the species tentatively into the genus Myiomela based on morphological similarities and pointed out that the placement in Brachypteryx was in error. In 2010, DNA sequence studies suggested an ancient divergence in these two populations and confirmed their elevation to full species. Another 2010 molecular phylogenetics study suggested that the genus Brachypteryx (the taxa sampled however, did not include the peninsular Indian forms) which was earlier thought to belong to the thrush family Turdidae belonged to the Old World flycatcher family Muscicapidae. The type species of Brachypteryx, B. montana, shows strong sexual dimorphism. The genus position was however not settled until 2017 and it was found based on a larger sampling that the species from southern India formed a group that is sister to the flycatchers in the genera Eumyias, Cyanoptila, Niltava, Cyornis and Anthipes. This led to the erection of the new genus Sholicola.

== Habitat and distribution ==
The natural habitat of the white-bellied blue robin is forest patches in the valleys of high altitude grasslands known as sholas. The species has been found to occur only above 1200 m altitude in the higher hill ranges of southern India. These forest patches are highly restricted in size and the species is thus threatened by habitat loss.

Populations are mainly in the Anaimalai and Cardamom Hills, both south of the Palghat gap. The population in the Ashambu hills has been described as a new species Ashambu blue robin (Sholicola ashambuensis) which differs slightly in coloration and is estimated to have diverged from a common ancestor about 1.24 - 0.49 million years ago.

== Behaviour and ecology ==
These birds are found in dense forest in the dark lower canopy and forest floor. They are skulking but can be confiding. They call frequently with tit-like notes and harsh rattles. The song of S. albiventris is said to have a higher pitched and more musical song. Birds have been noted to moult their tail feathers in the beginning of June. Little is known of their dispersal, longevity and other aspects of life history although more than 133 birds have been ringed.

Two greyish green and brown-marked eggs are laid during the breeding season that varies from April to June, after the rains. The nest is placed in a tree hole or placed on a bank and is made of moss and fibrous roots and placed low over the ground.
