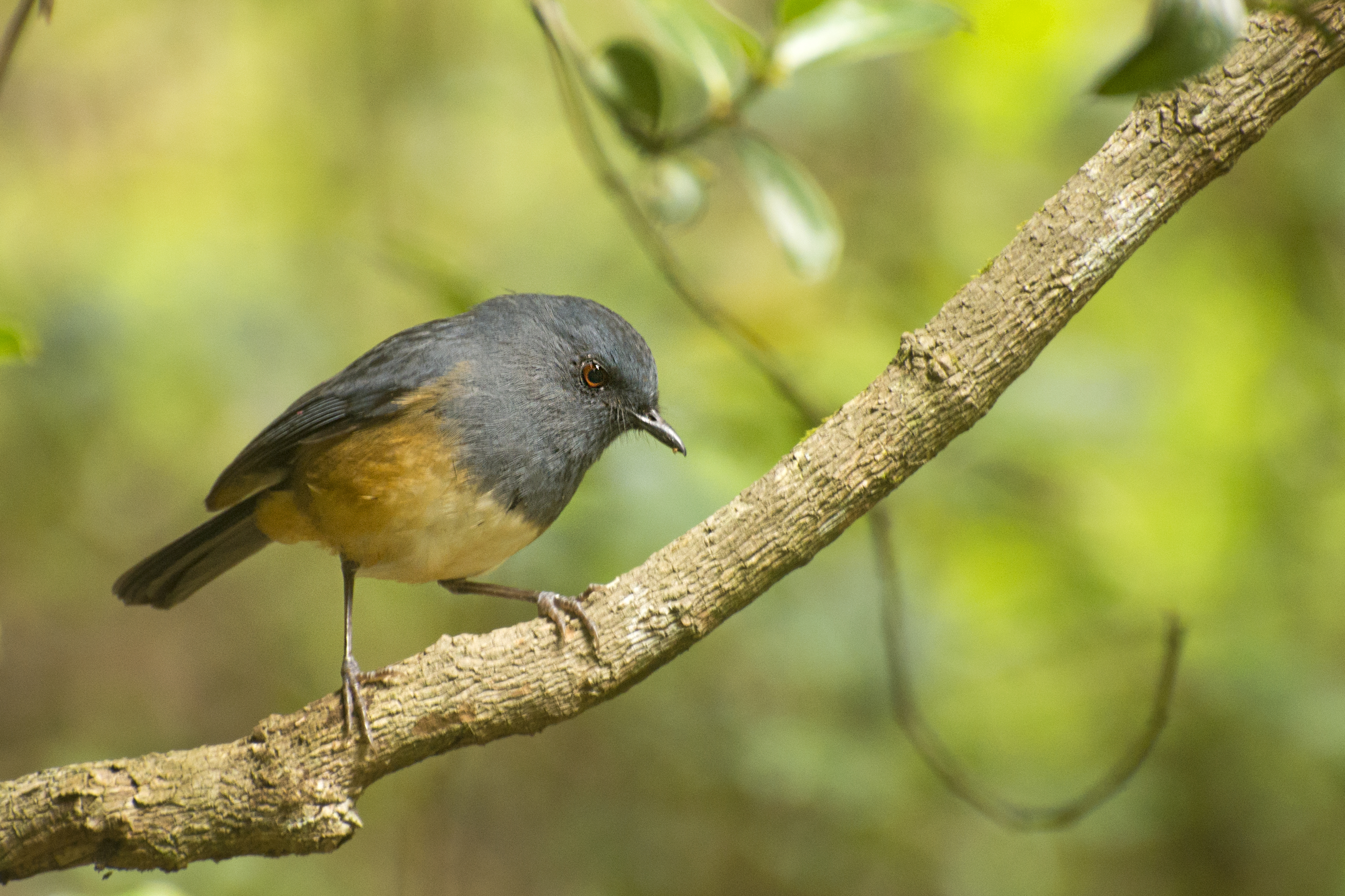

Conservation status
- Near Threatened (IUCN 3.1)

Scientific classification
- Kingdom: Animalia
- Phylum: Chordata
- Class: Aves
- Order: Passeriformes
- Family: Muscicapidae
- Genus: Sholicola
- Species: S. major

Binomial name
- Sholicola major (Jerdon, 1841)

Synonyms
- Phaenicura major Phoenicura major Brachypteryx major Callene rufiventris Myiomela major

= Nilgiri blue robin =

Species of bird

The Nilgiri blue robin (Sholicola major), also known as Nilgiri shortwing, white-bellied shortwing, Nilgiri sholakili or rufous-bellied shortwing is a species of passerine bird in the family Muscicapidae endemic to the Shola forests of the higher hills of southern India, mainly north of the Palghat Gap. This small bird is found on the forest floor and undergrowth of dense forest patches sheltered in the valleys of montane grassland, a restricted and threatened habitat.

The white-bellied blue robin was formerly considered conspecific with this species but in 2005 the two taxa were split by Pamela C. Rasmussen, a treatment that is followed by some authorities. Their genus remained uncertain until a 2017 molecular phylogenetic study found that these two south Indian species formed a sister group to a clade containing the genera Eumyias, Niltava and Cyornis. A new genus Sholicola was therefore erected for these two species.

== Description ==
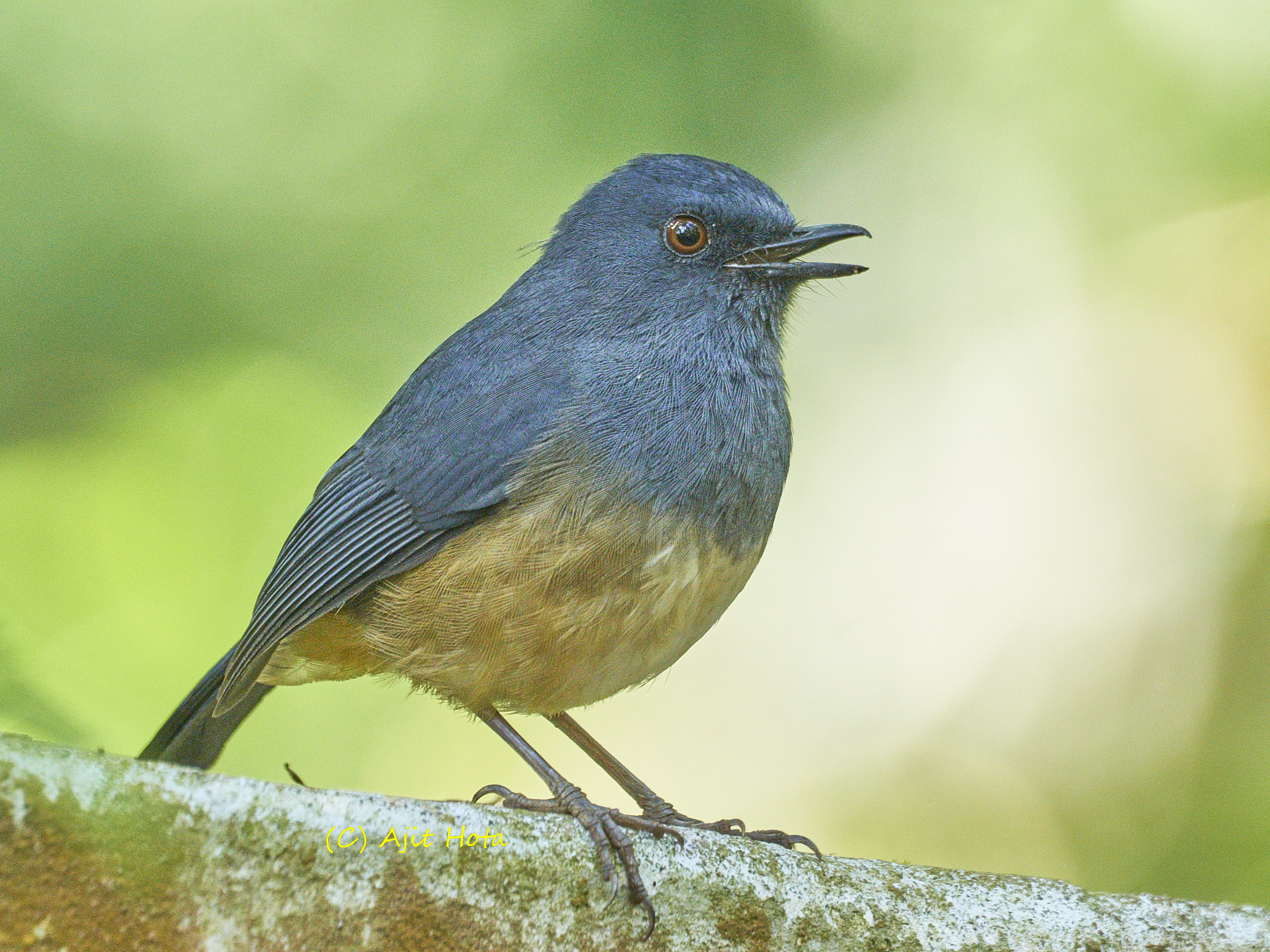
Nilgiri blue robin at Coonoor

This chat-like bird is long-legged and appears chunky with its short tail and wing. Although sharing similar habits and shape, the two species differ in plumage and both may show slight sexual dimorphism. Females may differ from males in iris colour at least in S. albiventris.

The Nilgiri blue robin (S. major) has the lores black and the upperside, the throat, breast are dark slaty blue but the lower plumage is rufous. The centre of the belly is buffy white. The brow is not as well-marked as in the other species and is diffuse bluish.

== Taxonomy and systematics ==
Thomas C. Jerdon obtained a specimen of the rufous-bellied species from the Nilgiris and called it Phaenicura major ("Large Red-start") in 1844 but Edward Blyth suggested that the species should be placed in the genus Callene that he had separated from the already extant Brachypteryx, a genus in which he also placed the blue-fronted robin (now Cinclidium frontale then Callene frontalis). Jerdon then suggested the new name of Callene rufiventris, a name not used due to the priority given to the names first proposed. Eugene Oates in the first edition of The Fauna of British India moved the species back into the genus Brachypteryx stating that they were congeneric with Brachypteryx cruralis while also noting that the young birds were speckled as in true-thrushes like Callene (as represented by the blue-fronted robin). Oates also used the name "Rufous-bellied Short-wing". This genus placement was carried on in the second edition of The Fauna of British India (1924) by E. C. Stuart Baker but was demoted into a subspecies on the basis of a specimen collected by T. F. Bourdillon at Mynal which was claimed to be intermediate to the two forms. Claud Buchanan Ticehurst in 1939 reaffirmed the genus placement. This treatment as subspecies was carried forward by Salim Ali and Sidney Dillon Ripley in their "Handbook" until the old two species were restored by P C Rasmussen in 2005. In the Birds of South Asia (2005), however they moved the species tentatively into the genus Myiomela based on morphological similarities and pointed out that the placement in Brachypteryx was in error (as Brachypteryx is strongly sexually dimorphic).

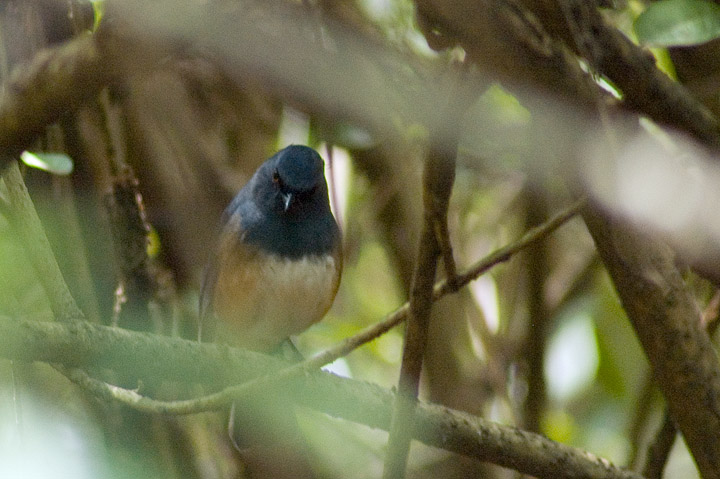
Plumage of Sholicola major underside showing the rufous flanks and white belly

In 2010, DNA sequence studies suggested an ancient divergence in these two populations and confirmed their elevation to full species. The genus position was however not settled. Another 2010 molecular phylogenetics study suggested that the genus Brachypteryx (the taxa sampled however, did not include the peninsular Indian forms) which was earlier thought to belong to the thrush family Turdidae belonged to the Old World flycatcher family Muscicapidae. The type species of Brachypteryx, B. montana, shows strong sexual dimorphism. A 2017 study found that the species from southern India formed a group that is a sister to the clade (treated as subfamily Niltavinae) of flycatchers in the genera Eumyias, Cyanoptila, Niltava, Cyornis and Anthipes and the new genus of Sholicola was erected for them.

== Habitat and distribution ==
Its natural habitat is forest patches in the valleys of high altitude grasslands known as sholas. The species has been found to occur only above 1200 m altitude in the higher hill ranges of Western Ghats. These forest patches are highly restricted in size and the species is thus threatened by habitat loss.

Populations of S. major are found in the Nilgiris, the Bababudan hills and the Brahmagiris.

== Behaviour and ecology ==
These birds are found in dense forest in the dark lower canopy and forest floor. They are skulking but can be confiding. They call frequently with tit-like notes and harsh rattles. The song of S. major is said to be series of shrill whistles and twangy buzzing sounds. Geographically isolated populations show variations in their songs. Birds have been noted to moult their tail feathers in the beginning of June. Little is known of their dispersal, longevity and other aspects of life history although more than 133 birds have been ringed.

Two greyish green and brown-marked eggs are laid during the breeding season that varies from April to June, after the rains. The nest is placed in a tree hole or placed on a bank and is made of moss and fibrous roots and placed low over the ground. The incubation period is about 16 to 17 days. Both parents share the nesting duties like incubation and feeding the nestlings. Old nests from the previous year may sometimes be reused.
