= Flores jungle flycatcher =

Conservation status
- Least Concern (IUCN 3.1)

Scientific classification
- Kingdom: Animalia
- Phylum: Chordata
- Class: Aves
- Order: Passeriformes
- Family: Muscicapidae
- Genus: Eumyias
- Species: E. oscillans

Binomial name
- Eumyias oscillans (Hartert, EJO, 1897)

Species of bird

The Flores jungle flycatcher (Eumyias oscillans) is a passerine bird in the Old World flycatcher family Muscicapidae that is endemic to the Lesser Sunda Islands.

This species was previously placed in the genus Rhinomyias but was moved to Cyornis based on the results of a 2010 molecular phylogenetic study. It is now placed in the genus Eumyias. The Sumba jungle flycatcher (C. stresemanni), which is endemic to the island of Sumba, was split as distinct species by the IOC in 2021. Both species were known together as the russet-backed jungle flycatcher.
