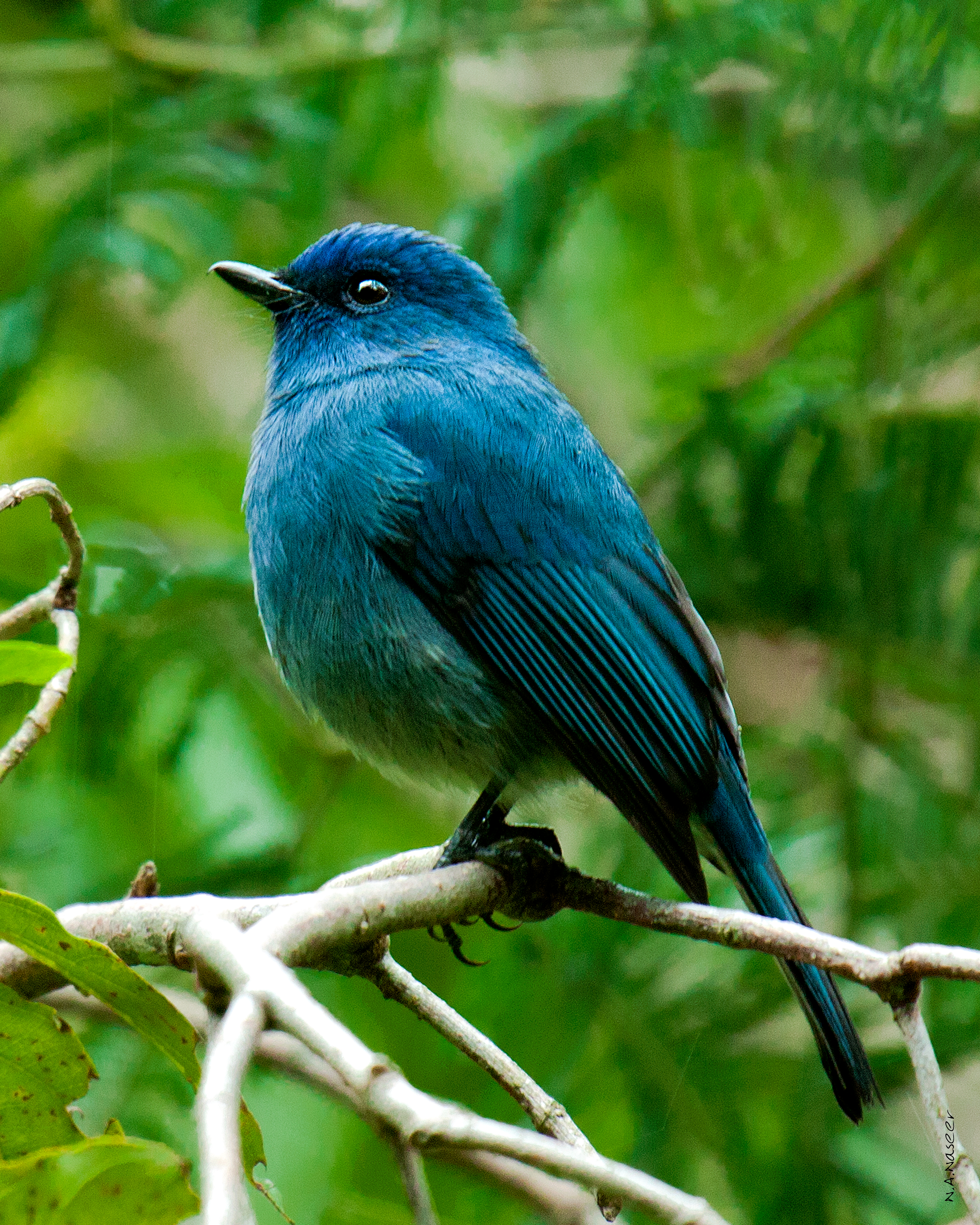

Conservation status
- Least Concern (IUCN 3.1)

Scientific classification
- Kingdom: Animalia
- Phylum: Chordata
- Class: Aves
- Order: Passeriformes
- Family: Muscicapidae
- Genus: Eumyias
- Species: E. albicaudatus

Binomial name
- Eumyias albicaudatus (Jerdon, 1840)

Synonyms
- Muscicapa albicaudata Stoparola albicaudata

= Nilgiri flycatcher =

Species of bird

The Nilgiri flycatcher (Eumyias albicaudatus) is an Old World flycatcher with a very restricted range in the hills of southern India. It was formerly referred to as the Nilgiri verditer flycatcher because of its similarity to the verditer flycatcher, a winter migrant to the Nilgiris, which, however, has distinct dark lores and a lighter shade of blue. There are two small white patches at the base of the tail. It is found mainly in the higher altitude shola forests of the Western Ghats and the Nilgiris.

== Identification ==
This small and somewhat long-tailed flycatcher is about 13 cm (5.1 in). It is dark steely indigo blue with some violet-blue on the forehead and darker lores. It is much darker than the verditer flycatcher and does not have as strong a contrast in the pale face and black lores. The female is duller with dark brown on the upperparts and dark grey below. The two central tail feathers are blue and the lateral feathers are dark brown and edged with indigo. The bases of the outer tail feathers are white but this is not easily visible when the bird is sitting. The wing feathers are dark brown with a narrow outer fringe of blue. The juvenile is dark brown with creamy spots and a scaly appearance on the throat and breast. The bill and legs are black and the iris is dark brown.

== Distribution ==
This species is found in the higher hills (mostly above 1200 m) of the Nilgiris, Palni Hills, Anaimalai Hills, the Brahmagiri, Bababudan Hills, and Biligiriranga Hills.

== Behaviour and ecology ==
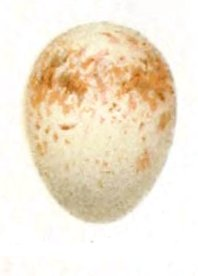
Egg

Like most flycatchers, it makes sallies to capture insects and returns to its perch. It forages mainly in the lower storey but can sometimes be found on top of the canopy. The song is a series of rich warbling notes (having a resemblance to the call of the pied bushchat) while the usual call is a soft nasal chipping eep. They perch upright and produce the chipping note while flicking the tail up and down. The breeding season is from March to June but peak egg-laying is in April. The nest is built in a cavity in an earth bank or a tree hole. They also use the eaves of houses and wood-work of bridges. The nest is a cup with mosses and lichens on the outside with some feathers and is not very well lined on the inside. The usual clutch is two to three eggs. The eggs are creamy brown with a dense mottling close along the broadest part of the egg.
