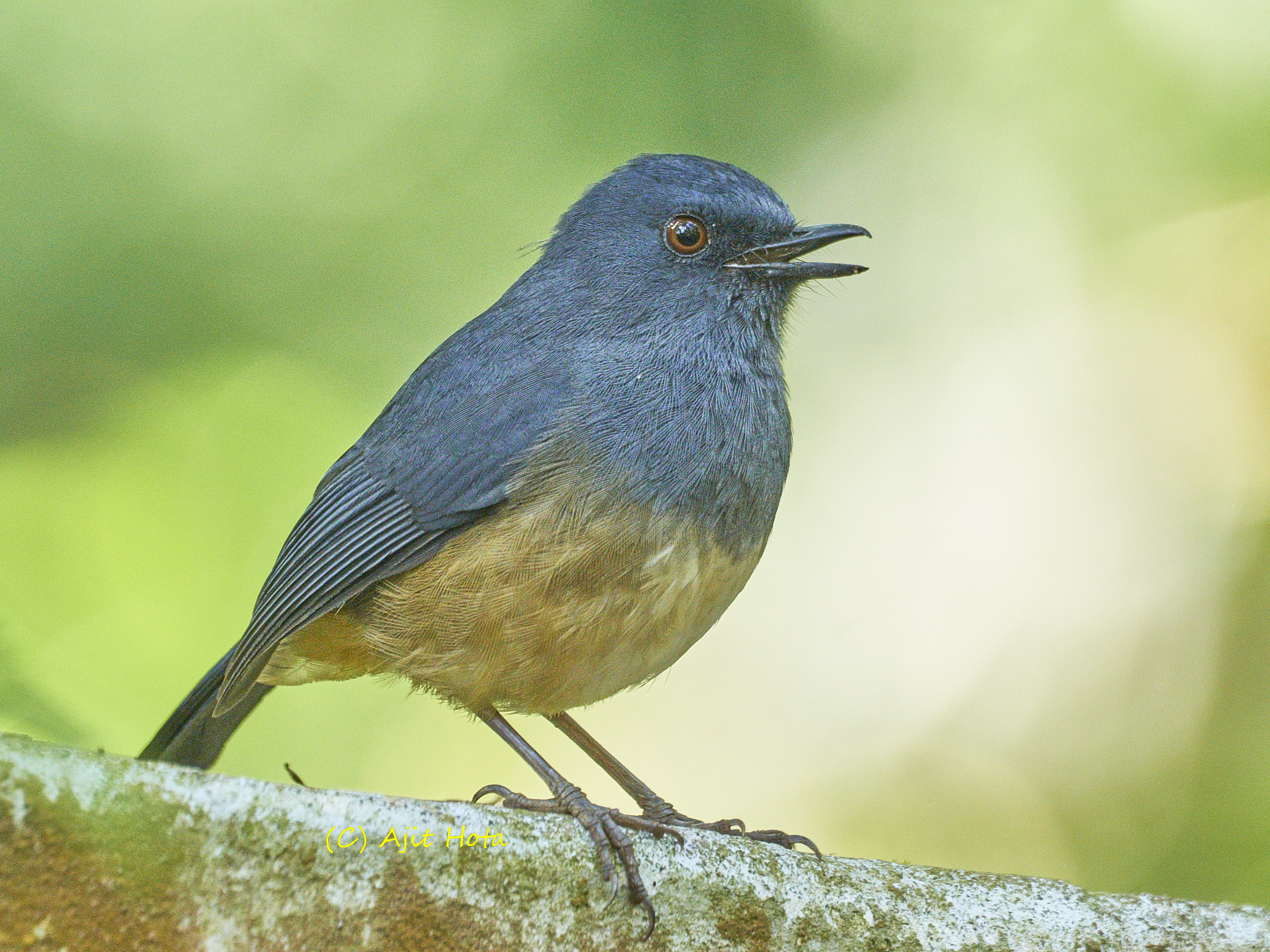
- Nilgiri blue robin (Sholicola major)

Scientific classification
- Kingdom: Animalia
- Phylum: Chordata
- Class: Aves
- Order: Passeriformes
- Family: Muscicapidae
- Genus: Sholicola; Robin et al., 2017

= Sholicola =

Genus of birds

Sholicola is a genus of bird in the family Muscicapidae that was erected in 2017. They are commonly referred to as sholakilis. The two species placed in this genus are endemic to the montane grassland and cloud forest complex known as sholas in southern India:

Image	Common name	Scientific name
	Nilgiri blue robin	Sholicola major
	White-bellied blue robin	Sholicola albiventris

A third species Sholicola ashambuensis described by the original authors is close to Sholicola albiventris and may possibly be treated as a subspecies of the latter.

They were formerly placed in the genus Brachypteryx and thought to be "shortwings". Species in the genus Brachypteryx show strong sexual dimorphism and because of this misplacement, the two south Indian species were moved to Myiomela by Pamela Rasmussen. Molecular phylogeny studies however showed these two species to be flycatchers that foraged close to the ground. A new genus had to be erected as the species are quite distinct from their sister genera Niltava, Cyornis and Eumyias from which they diverged about 11 million years ago [(Sholicola is basal in the clade that contains it - Sholicola, (Cyornis, (Niltava, (Eumyias, Cyanoptila))) which is sister to another major clade that includes Ficedula, Monticola, Saxicola, Luscinia, Tarsiger, Larvivora, Brachypteryx etc.].
