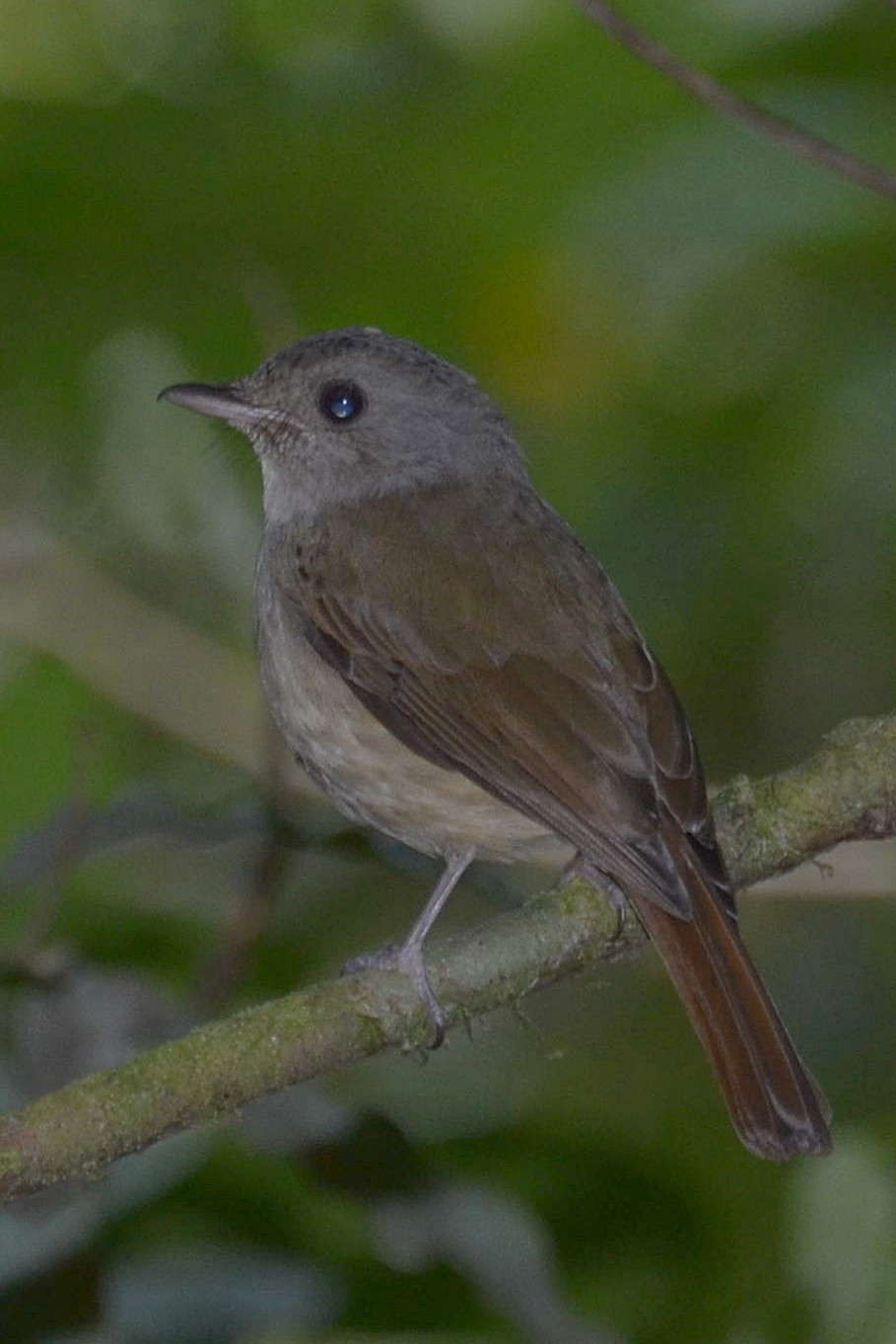

Conservation status
- Least Concern (IUCN 3.1)

Scientific classification
- Kingdom: Animalia
- Phylum: Chordata
- Class: Aves
- Order: Passeriformes
- Family: Muscicapidae
- Genus: Eumyias
- Species: E. sanfordi

Binomial name
- Eumyias sanfordi (Stresemann, 1931)

= Matinan blue flycatcher =

Species of bird

The Matinan blue flycatcher (Eumyias sanfordi), also known as the Matinan flycatcher, is a species of bird in the family Muscicapidae. It is endemic to the island of Sulawesi in Indonesia. Its natural habitat is subtropical or tropical moist montane forests, and the species is threatened by habitat loss.

== Description ==
The Matinan blue flycatcher is an unobtrusive small bird with an adult length of about 14.5 cm (5.7 in). The head and upperparts are greyish-brown, greyer on the crown of the head, darker on the side of the head and on the wings, and more olivaceous on the rump and tail. The underparts are pale brownish-grey and the area round the vent is yellowish buff. The large eye is black and the bill, which has a broad base and fine tip, is pinkish-buff and surrounded by short bristles.

== Behaviour ==
The Matinan blue flycatcher often joins other flycatchers in small flocks in the lower part of the forest canopy, and its behaviour and distribution is similar to that of the blue-fronted blue flycatcher (Cyornis hoevelli). It feeds on small insects which it catches by swooping from a perch where it has been keenly surveying its surroundings while twisting its head from side to side. It has been observed nesting in a cavity in a dead tree in a disturbed habitat which may indicate that it is capable of tolerating some destruction of the primary forest.

== Status ==
The Matinan blue flycatcher is known from about four locations in the mountains of the Minahasa Peninsula in northern Sulawesi. One of these is the Gunung Ambang Nature Reserve where it is present in both primary and secondary forest at heights of around 1,400 metres (4,600 ft) above sea level. The total number of these birds has not been quantified but may be in the region of between ten and twenty thousand individuals. The population is thought to be decreasing, the main reason for this being the degradation of its habitat, with the fringes of the montane forest being cleared by logging. The IUCN lists this bird as being least concern.
