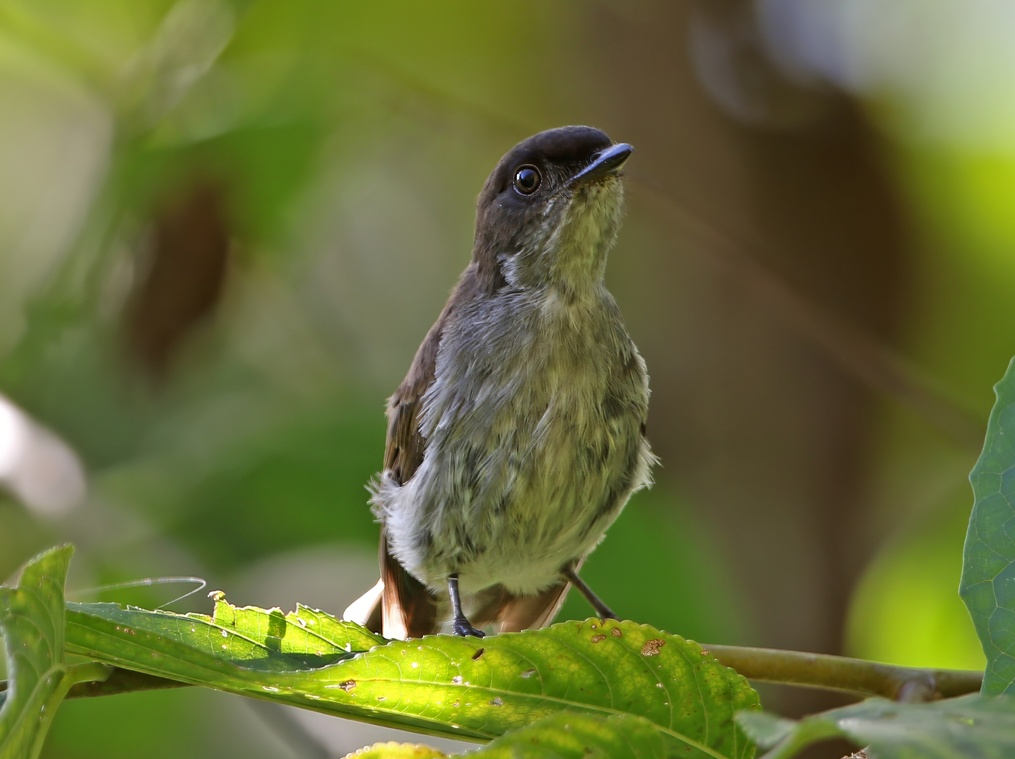

Conservation status
- Near Threatened (IUCN 3.1)

Scientific classification
- Kingdom: Animalia
- Phylum: Chordata
- Class: Aves
- Order: Passeriformes
- Family: Muscicapidae
- Genus: Eumyias
- Species: E. additus

Binomial name
- Eumyias additus (Hartert, 1900)

Synonyms
- Rhinomyias addita; Rhinomyias additus

= Buru jungle flycatcher =

Species of bird

The Buru jungle flycatcher (Eumyias additus), also known as the streak-breasted jungle-flycatcher or streaky-breasted jungle-flycatcher, is a species of bird in the Old World flycatcher family Muscicapidae. It is endemic to the island of Buru in Indonesia where it originally inhabited tropical forests at elevations between 500 and 1,500 metres.

This species was previously assigned to the genus Rhinomyias but was moved to Eumyias after a 2010 molecular phylogenetic study found that Rhinomyias was polyphyletic.

== Conservation ==
Because of the very limited habitat, logging of the forests and expanding human activities on the island, the species was listed as vulnerable in 1994 by the IUCN. This classification was softened to near threatened in 2000 and 2004. The reasons for this change were the observed adjustment to the human environment, as the birds were found in the areas cleared of the forest, as well as the relatively stable condition of the mountainous forests on Buru.
