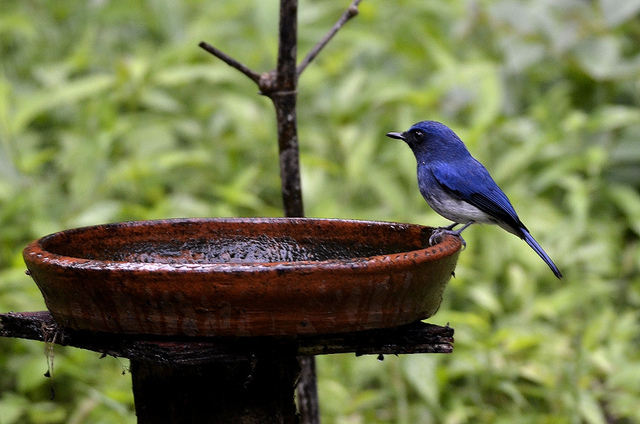
- Male at a bird bath (Dandeli, India) Call

Conservation status
- Least Concern (IUCN 3.1)

Scientific classification
- Kingdom: Animalia
- Phylum: Chordata
- Class: Aves
- Order: Passeriformes
- Family: Muscicapidae
- Genus: Cyornis
- Species: C. pallidipes

Binomial name
- Cyornis pallidipes (Jerdon, 1840)

Synonyms
- Cyornis pallipes Muscicapula pallipes

= White-bellied blue flycatcher =

Species of bird

The white-bellied blue flycatcher (Cyornis pallidipes) is a small passerine bird in the flycatcher family Muscicapidae. It is endemic to the Western Ghats (including the Nilgiris) of southwest India. Males are dark blue with a lighter shade of blue on the brow and have a greyish white belly. Females have a rufous breast, a white face and olive grey above.

== Description ==
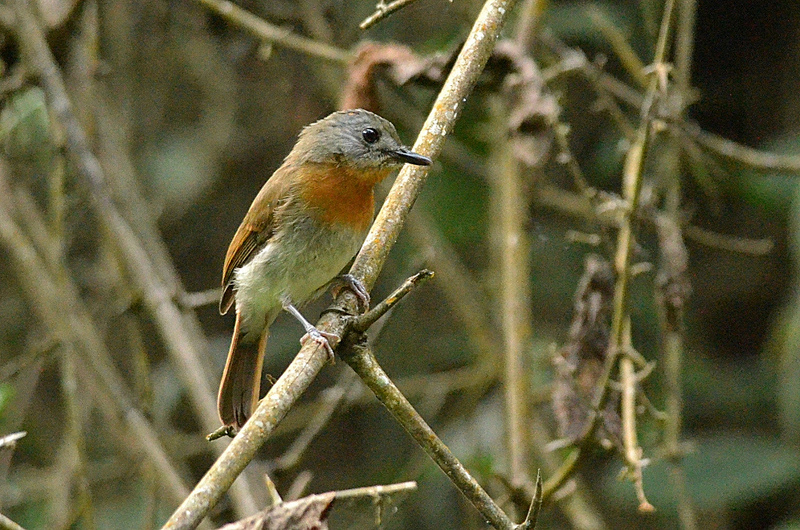
Female

This flycatcher is about 13 centimetres (5.1 in) long and has a longish beak. It forages in the undergrowth in the shade of dense forest canopy where it makes aerial forays to capture insects. The male is indigo blue with ultramarine blue supercilium and forehead. The lores and face are dark grey. The belly is white and bordered by smoky grey wash. The female is olive brown above with whitish lores. The rufous throat and breast fades to white towards the belly. The female has a chestnut tail and can be told apart from other flycatchers like by the lack of the black and white tail pattern. In poor lighting and within the Palni Hills it can be confusable with the white-bellied blue robin, which however has longer legs and is more likely to be seen on the ground.

== Distribution ==
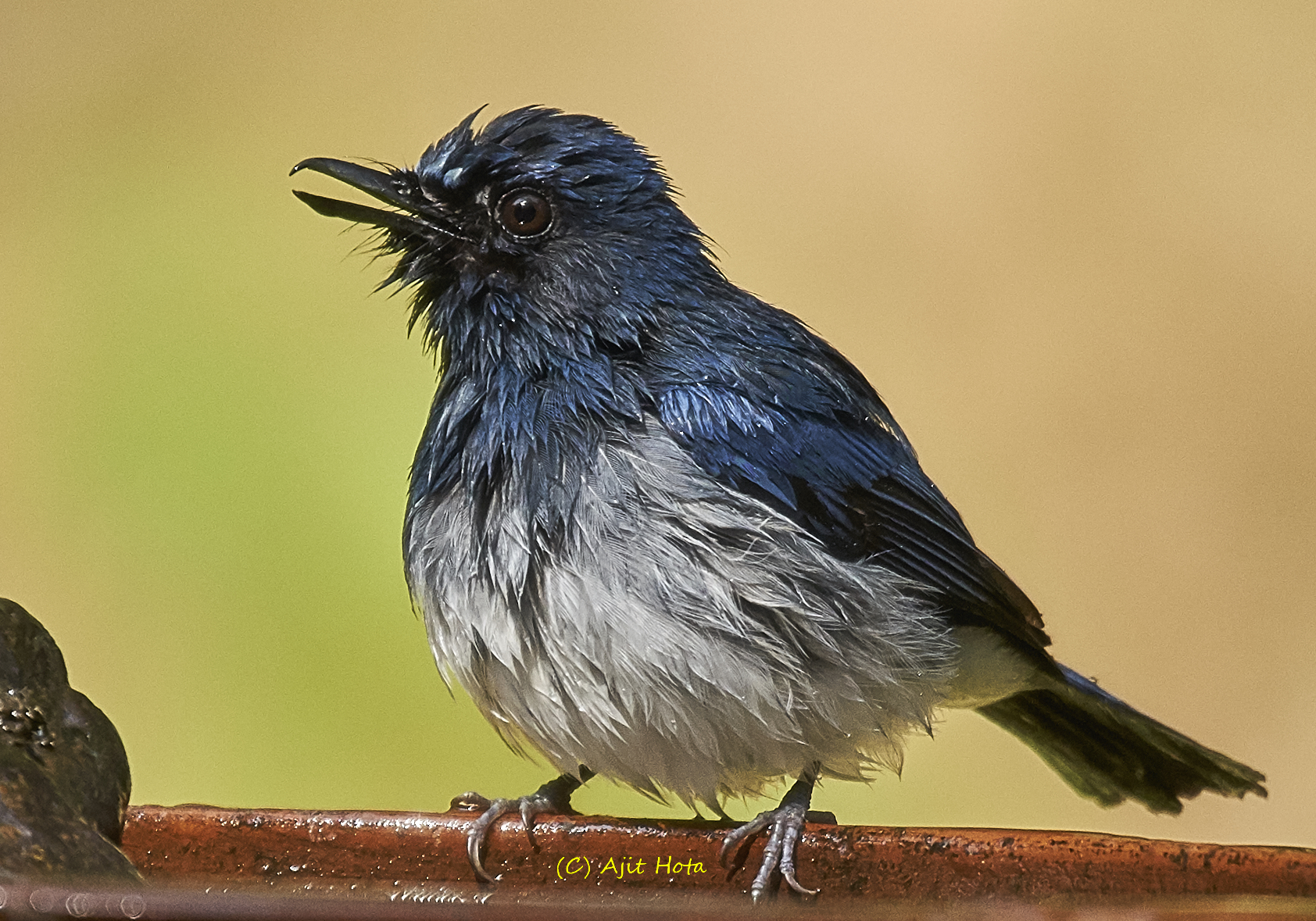
The white-bellied blue flycatcher male after a dip in water at Ganeshgudi, Dandeli

The white-bellied blue flycatcher occurs in dense forest and sholas south from Mahabaleshwar through the Western Ghats, extending into the Nilgiris and the Biligirirangan Hills, down to southern Tamil Nadu and Kerala. It is found mainly in the hill forests from the foothills to about 1700 m in the Nilgiris.

== Behaviour and ecology ==
The white-bellied blue flycatcher tends to be quiet and inactive, foraging mainly in the dark shade below the forest canopy. They have a very low song that can be heard only at close quarters. The song is a rambling series of rising and falling broken notes interspersed with clicks and squeaks. They are usually seen singly or in pairs and are often found to join mixed-species foraging flocks.

The breeding season is from February to September, mainly during the monsoon. The nest is a rough cup of moss neatly lined on the inside and placed low on a moss covered rock, hole in tree or mud-bank. The usual clutch is four eggs which are pale sea-green with brown spotting, denser on the broad end.
