= Sumatran blue robin =

Scientific classification
- Kingdom: Animalia
- Phylum: Chordata
- Class: Aves
- Order: Passeriformes
- Family: Muscicapidae
- Genus: Myiomela
- Species: M. sumatrana

Binomial name
- Myiomela sumatrana (Robinson & Kloss, 1918)

Species of bird

The Sumatran blue robin (Myiomela sumatrana) is an Old World flycatcher in the family Muscicapidae. It is endemic to the Indonesian island of Sumatra. It was formerly considered a subspecies of the Javan blue robin (M. diana), with the two being united under the name Sunda robin, but a 2020 study found them to represent distinct species. M. sumatrana can be physically distinguished from M. diana by its much darker plumage in both males and females.
