= Russet-backed jungle flycatcher =

The russet-backed jungle flycatcher have been split into two species:

- Flores jungle flycatcher, Cyornis oscillans
- Sumba jungle flycatcher, Cyornis stresemanni
