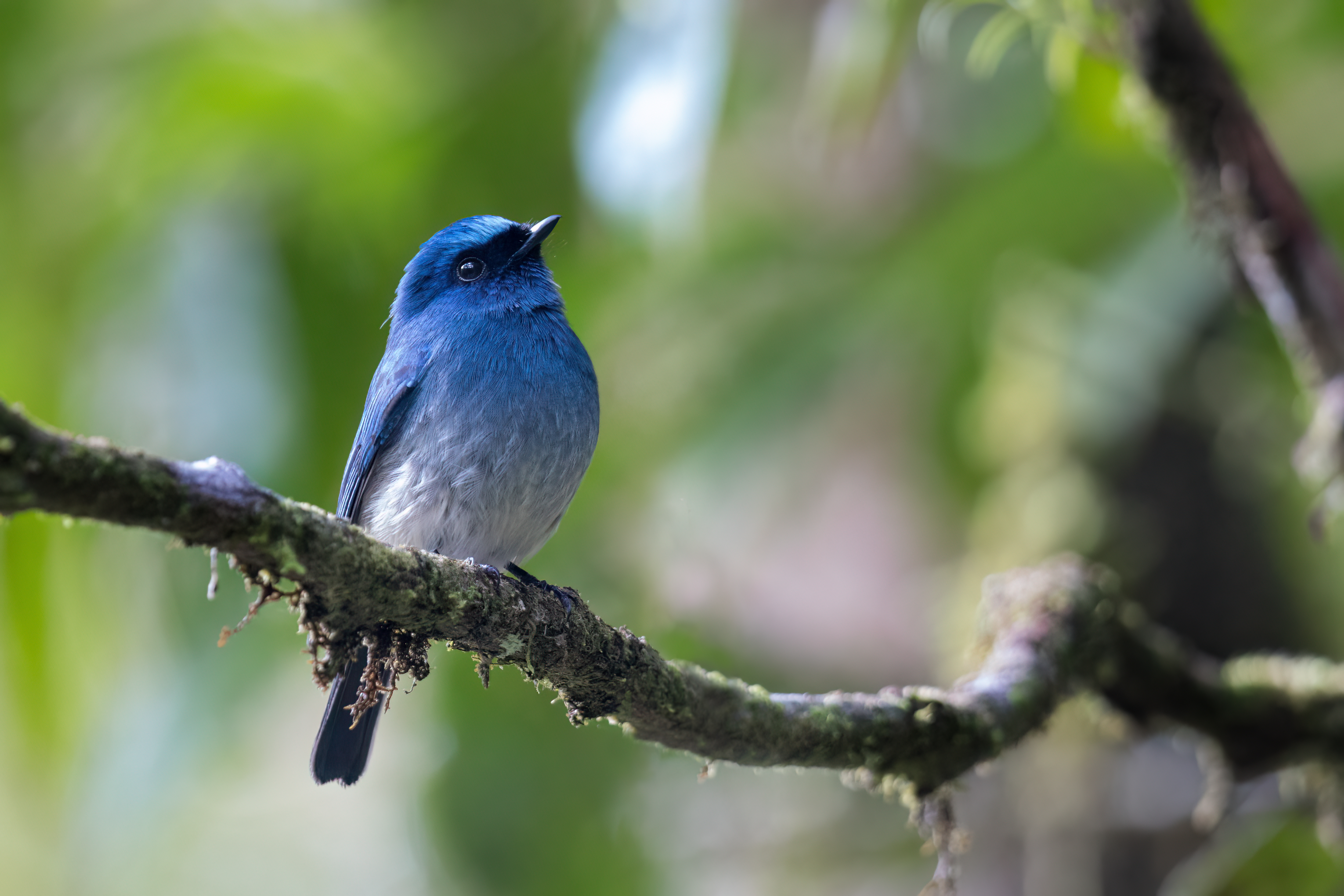

Conservation status
- Least Concern (IUCN 3.1)

Scientific classification
- Kingdom: Animalia
- Phylum: Chordata
- Class: Aves
- Order: Passeriformes
- Family: Muscicapidae
- Genus: Eumyias
- Species: E. indigo

Binomial name
- Eumyias indigo (Horsfield, 1821)

Synonyms
- Stoparola indigo

= Indigo flycatcher =

Species of bird

The indigo flycatcher (Eumyias indigo) is a species of bird in the Old World flycatcher family, Muscicapidae. It is found in Indonesia and Malaysia, where it is found in Sumatra, Java and northern montane areas of Borneo. Its natural habitat is tropical moist submontane montane forests between 900m to 3000m, where it is a common to fairly common species.
