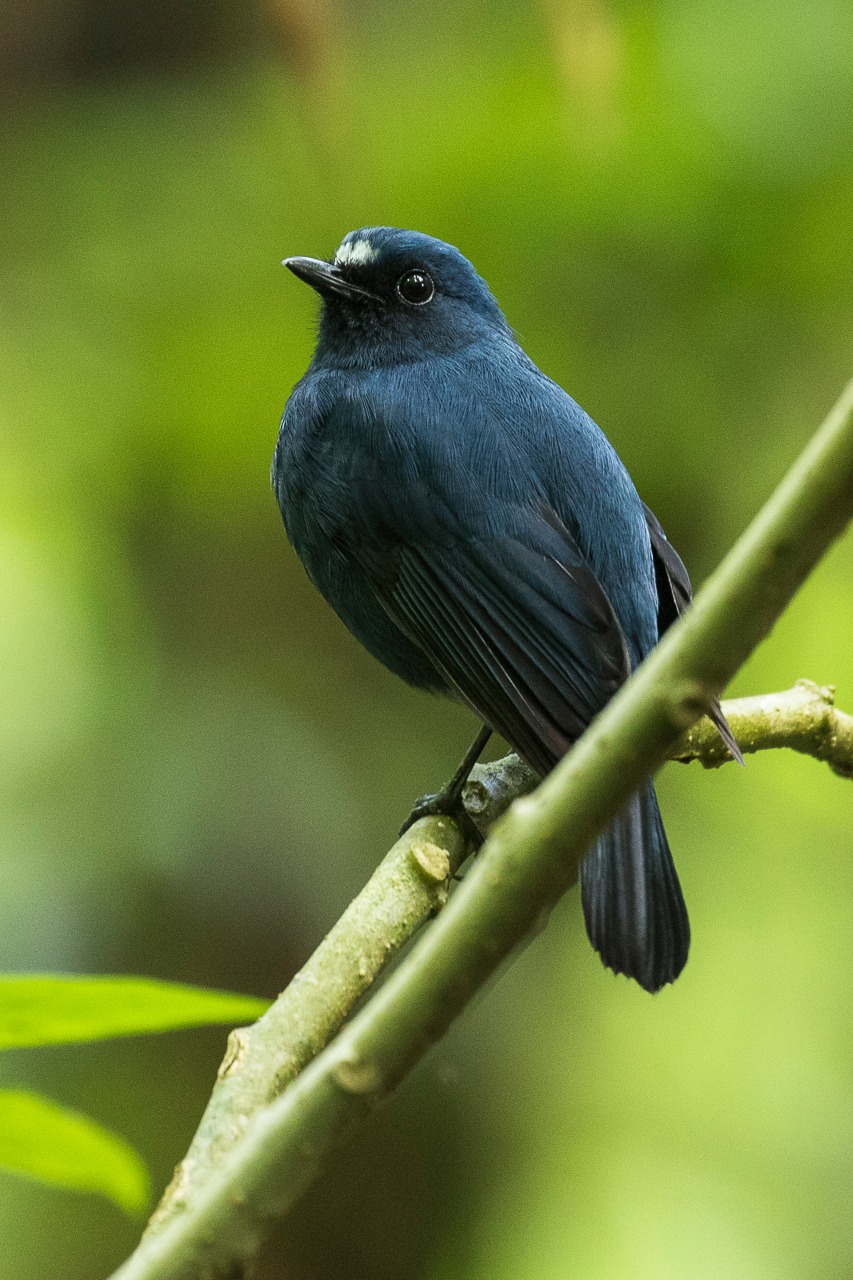

Conservation status
- Least Concern (IUCN 3.1)

Scientific classification
- Kingdom: Animalia
- Phylum: Chordata
- Class: Aves
- Order: Passeriformes
- Family: Muscicapidae
- Genus: Myiomela
- Species: M. diana

Binomial name
- Myiomela diana (Lesson, 1831)

= Javan blue robin =

Species of bird

The Javan blue robin (Myiomela diana) is a species of bird in the family Muscicapidae. It is endemic to the Indonesian island of Java. Its natural habitat is subtropical or tropical moist montane forests. The Sumatran blue robin (Myiomela sumatrana) was formerly considered a subspecies of M. diana, with both the Javan and Sumatran subspecies being grouped under the name Sunda robin.
