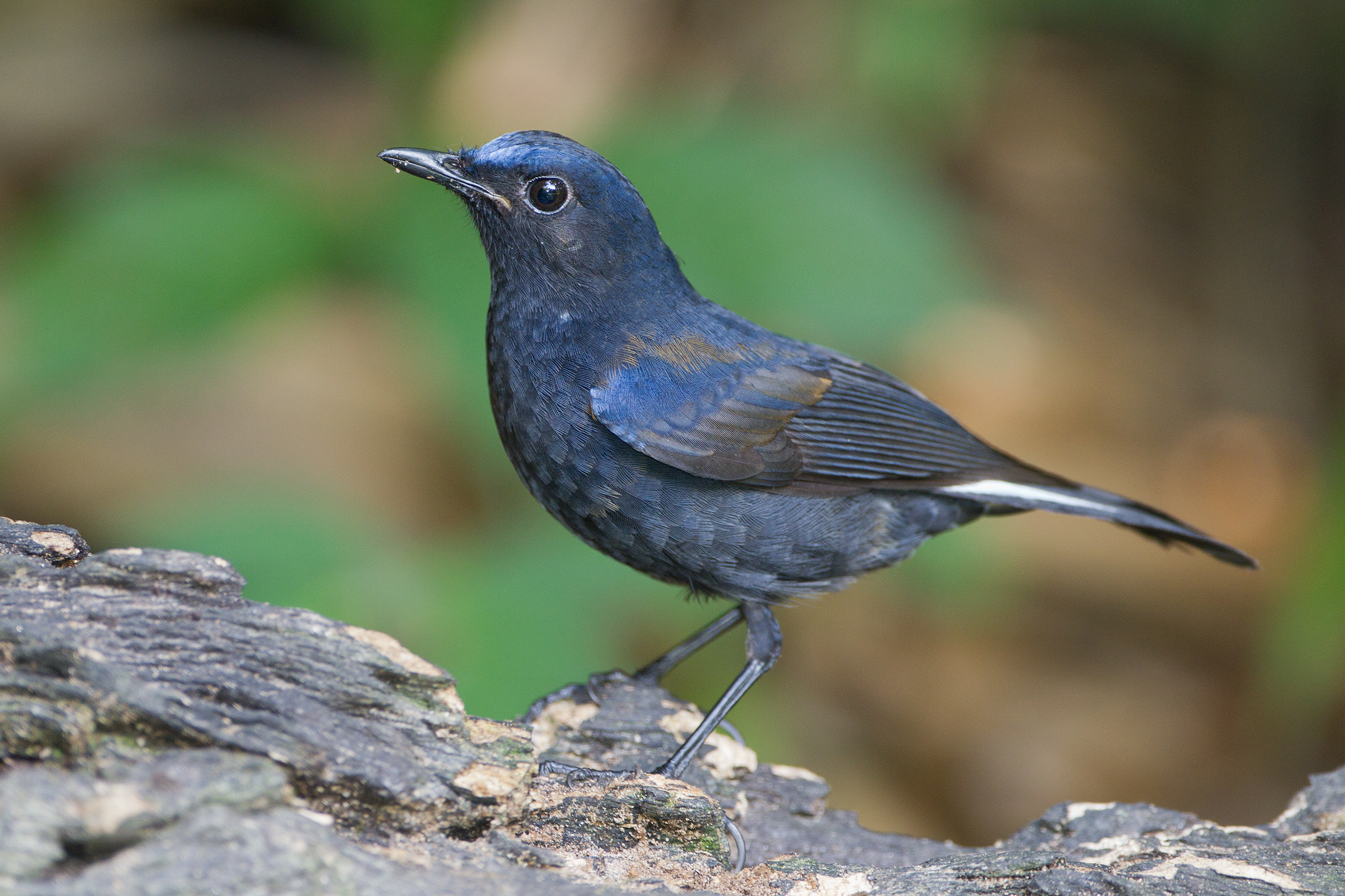
- male
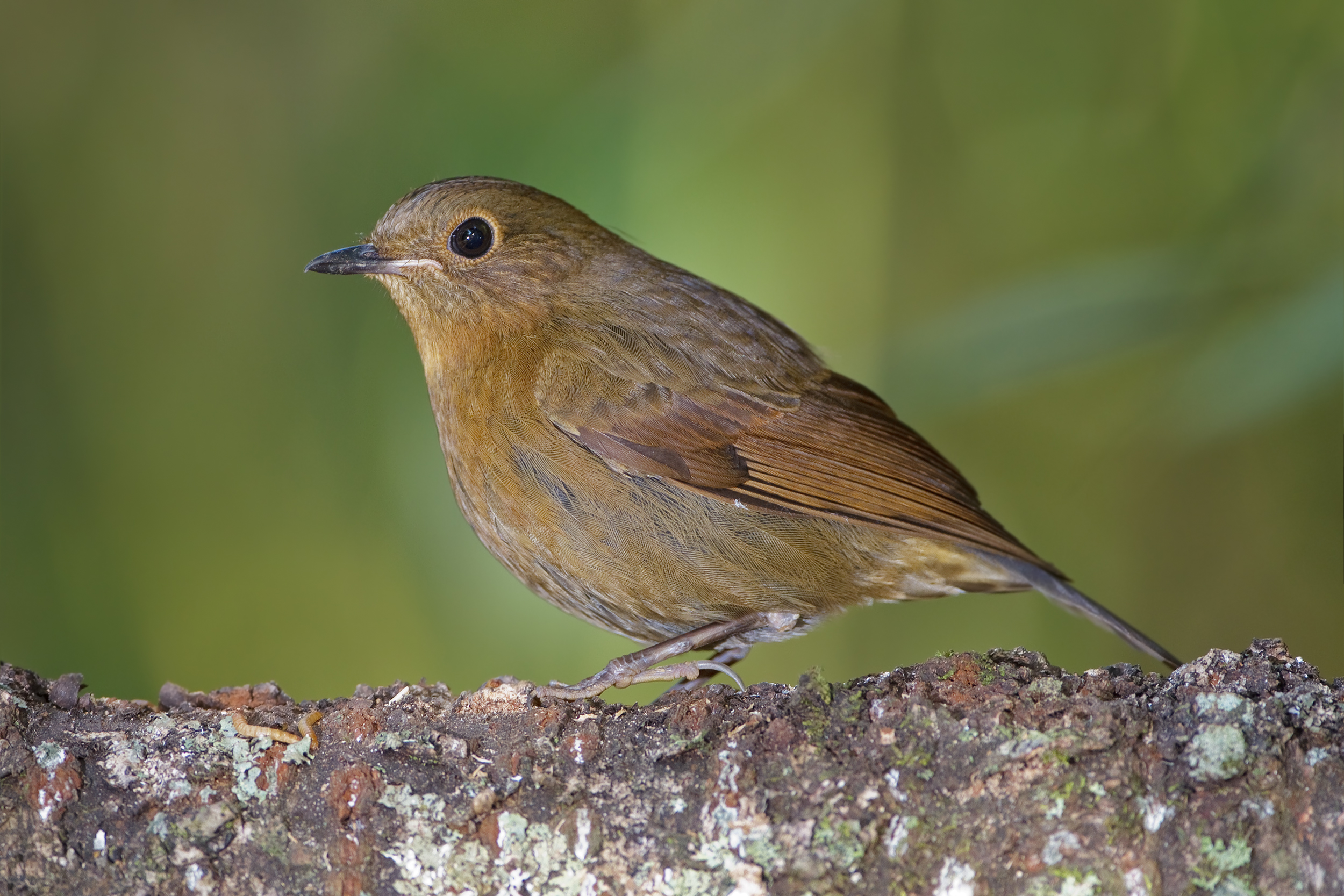
- female

Conservation status
- Least Concern (IUCN 3.1)

Scientific classification
- Kingdom: Animalia
- Phylum: Chordata
- Class: Aves
- Order: Passeriformes
- Family: Muscicapidae
- Genus: Myiomela
- Species: M. leucura

Binomial name
- Myiomela leucura (Hodgson, 1845)

Synonyms
- Cinclidium cambodiana Cinclidium leucurum

= White-tailed robin =

Species of bird

The white-tailed robin (Myiomela leucura) is an Old World flycatcher in the family Muscicapidae. It ranges across the northern regions of the Indian subcontinent and adjacent areas of Southeast Asia. It is found in Bangladesh, Bhutan, Cambodia, India, Laos, Malaysia, Myanmar, Nepal, Taiwan, Thailand, and Vietnam. Its natural habitats are subtropical or tropical moist lowland forest and subtropical or tropical moist montane forest.

== Gallery ==
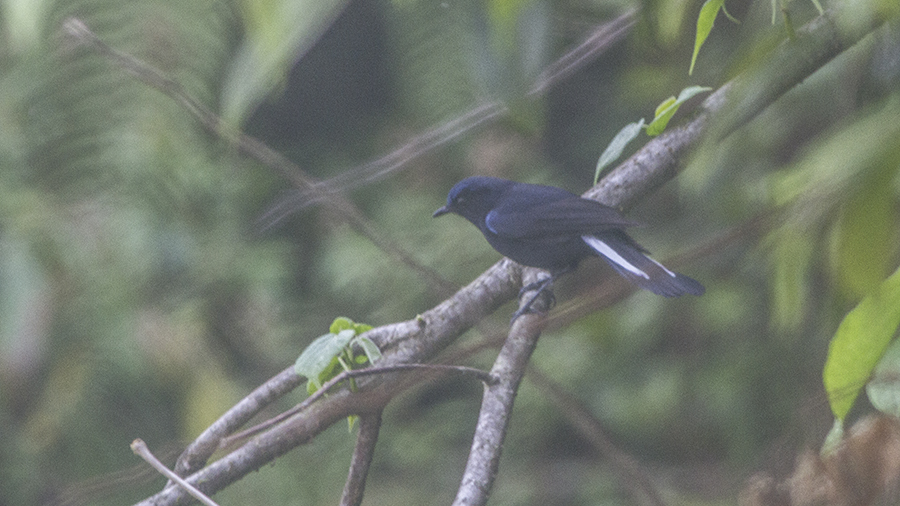
White-tailed robin from Neora Valley National Park in Darjeeling, West Bengal

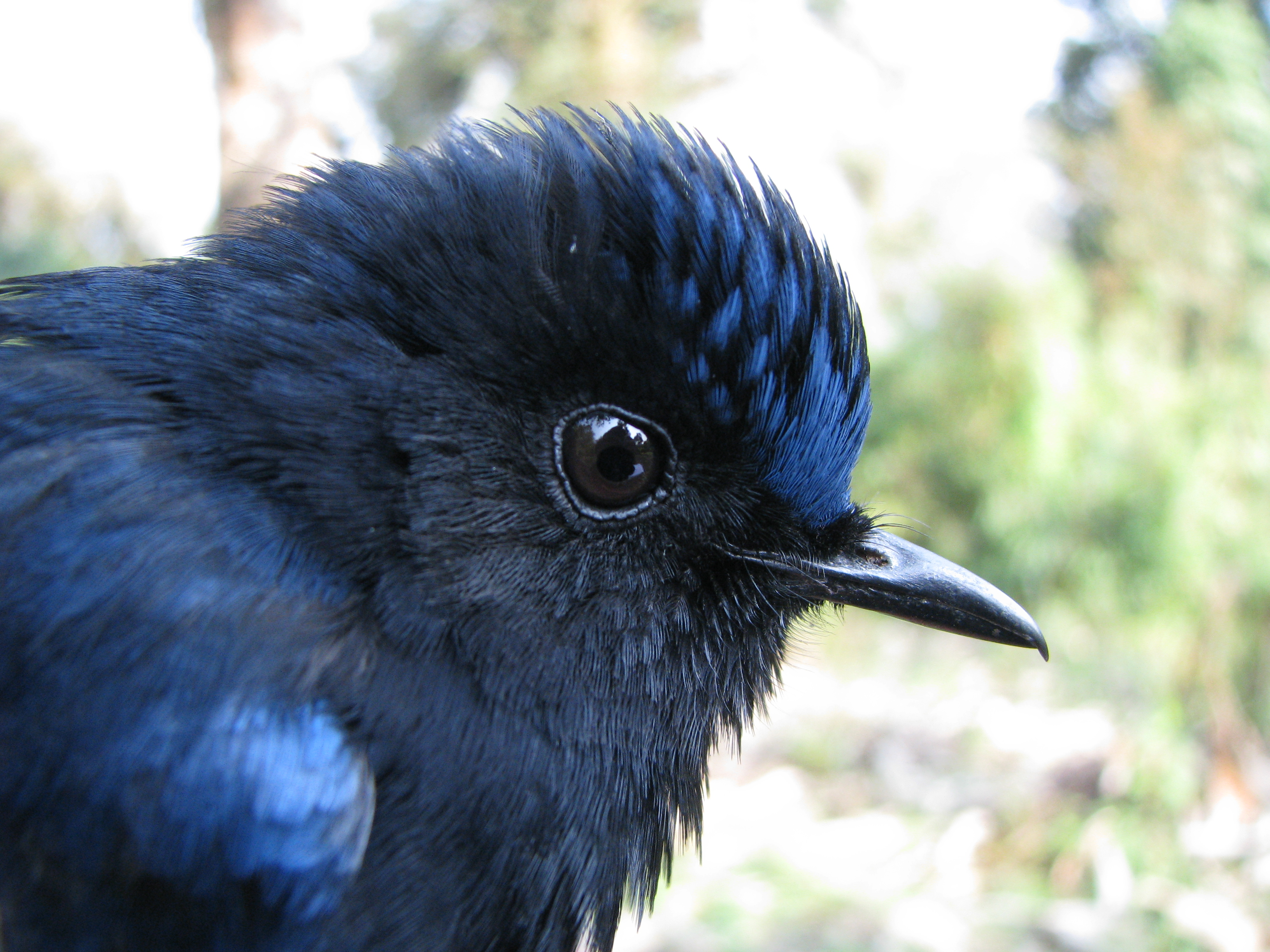
Close-up of a male's head

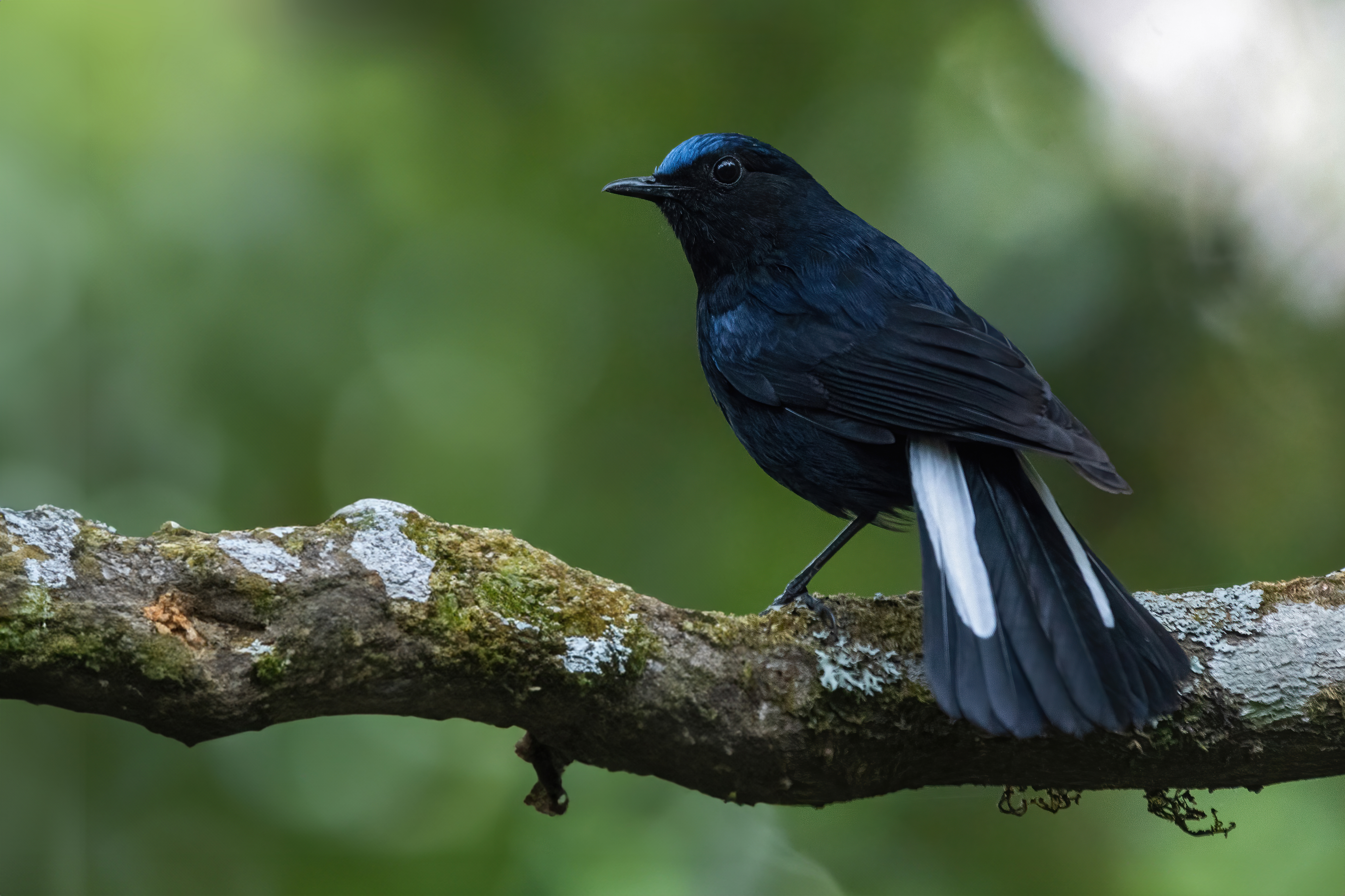
In Phoolchoki Forest, Godawari, Lalitpur Nepal.

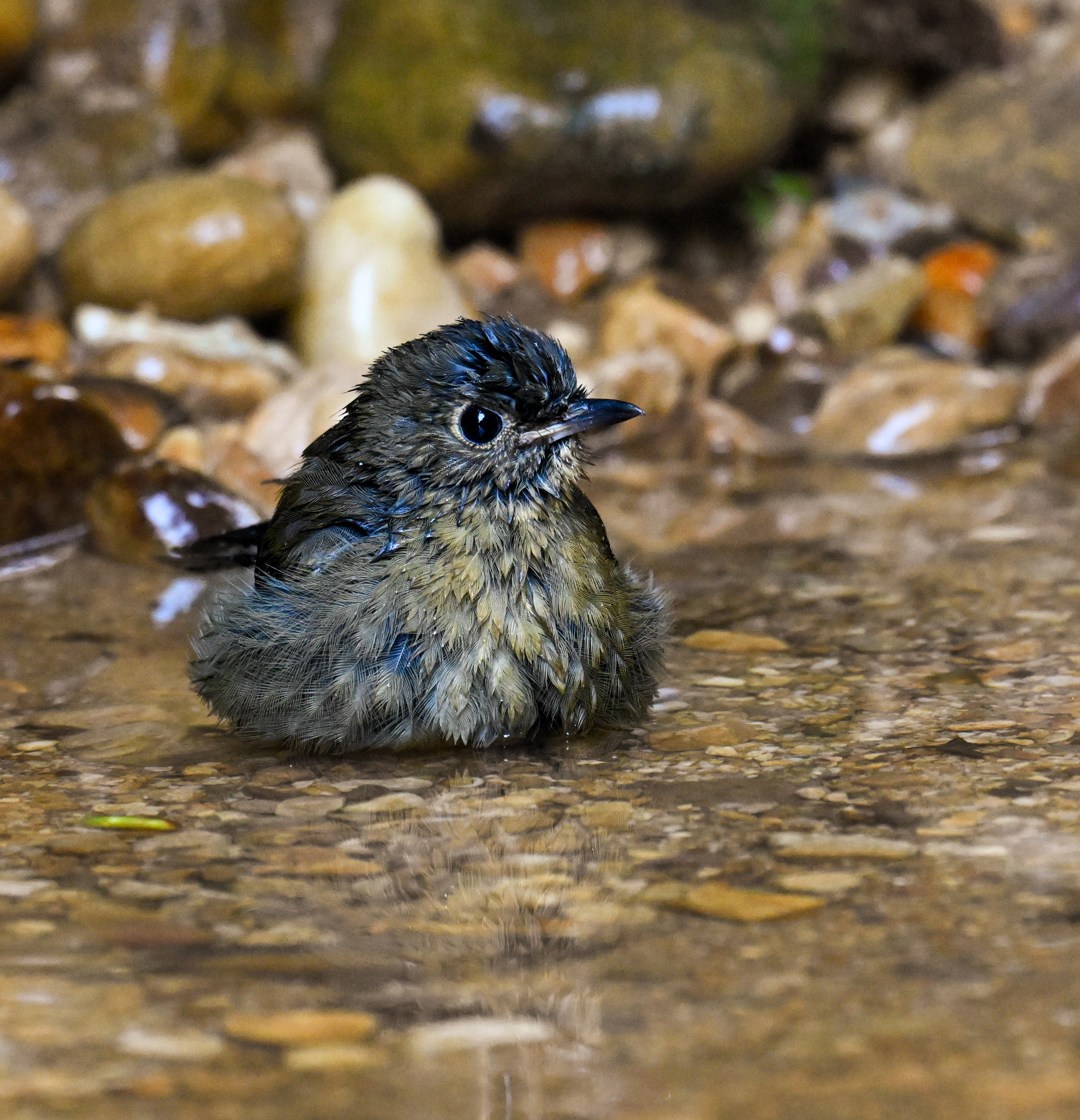
A White-tailed Robin bathing is spotted in Dulung Reserve Forest, Assam
