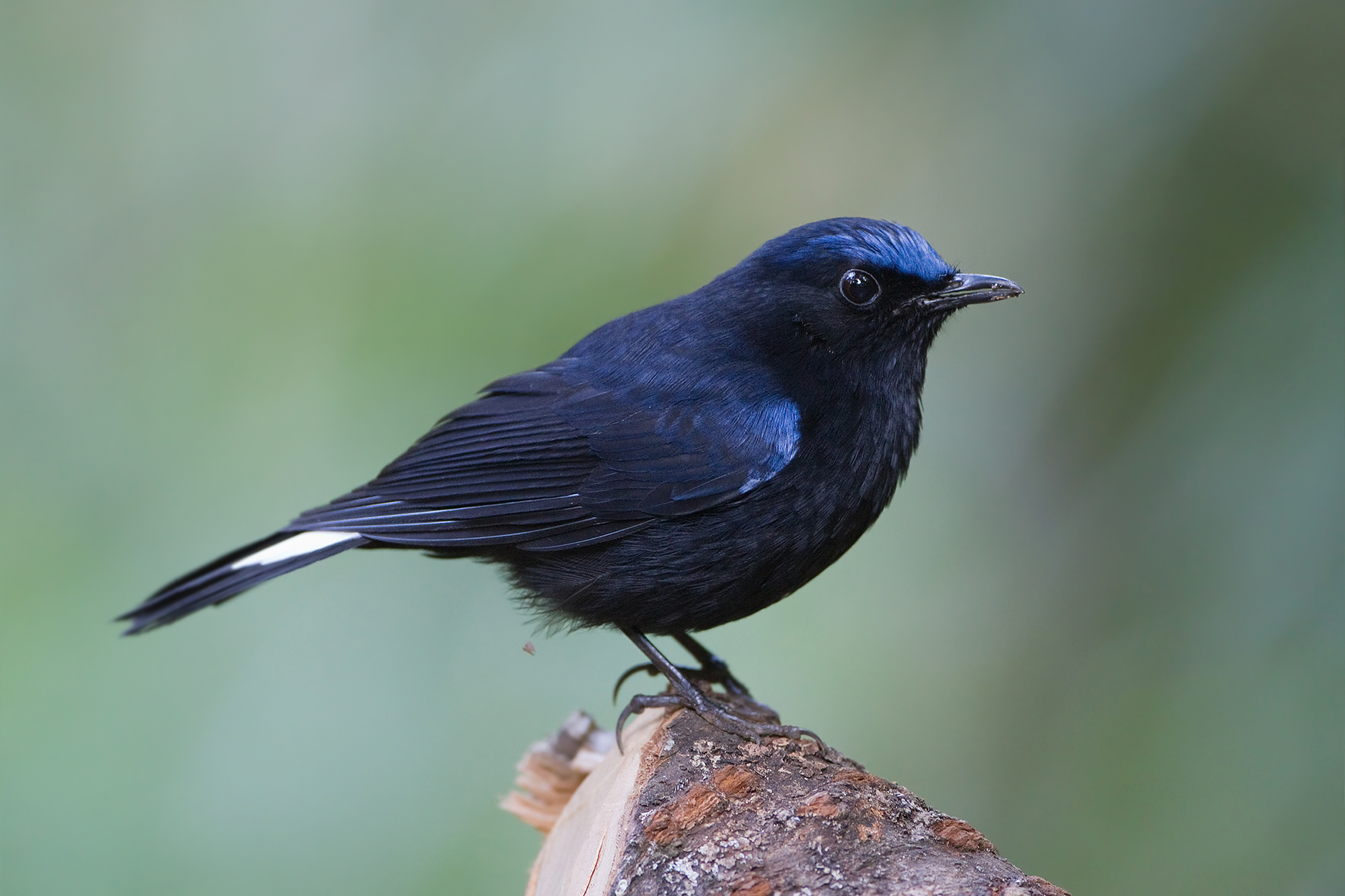
- White-tailed robin (Myiomela leucura)

Scientific classification
- Kingdom: Animalia
- Phylum: Chordata
- Class: Aves
- Order: Passeriformes
- Family: Muscicapidae
- Genus: Myiomela; G.R. Gray, 1846

Type species
- Muscisylvia leucura Hodgson, 1845

= Myiomela =

Genus of birds

Myiomela is a genus of bird in the family Muscicapidae. Some members have sometimes been included in the genus Cinclidium and the phylogeny has not been resolved completely.

The genus currently includes three species:

- White-tailed robin (Myiomela leucura)
- Javan blue robin (Myiomela diana)
- Sumatran blue robin (Myiomela sumatrana)

Species from southern India that were tentatively placed in this genus are now treated in the genus Sholicola.
