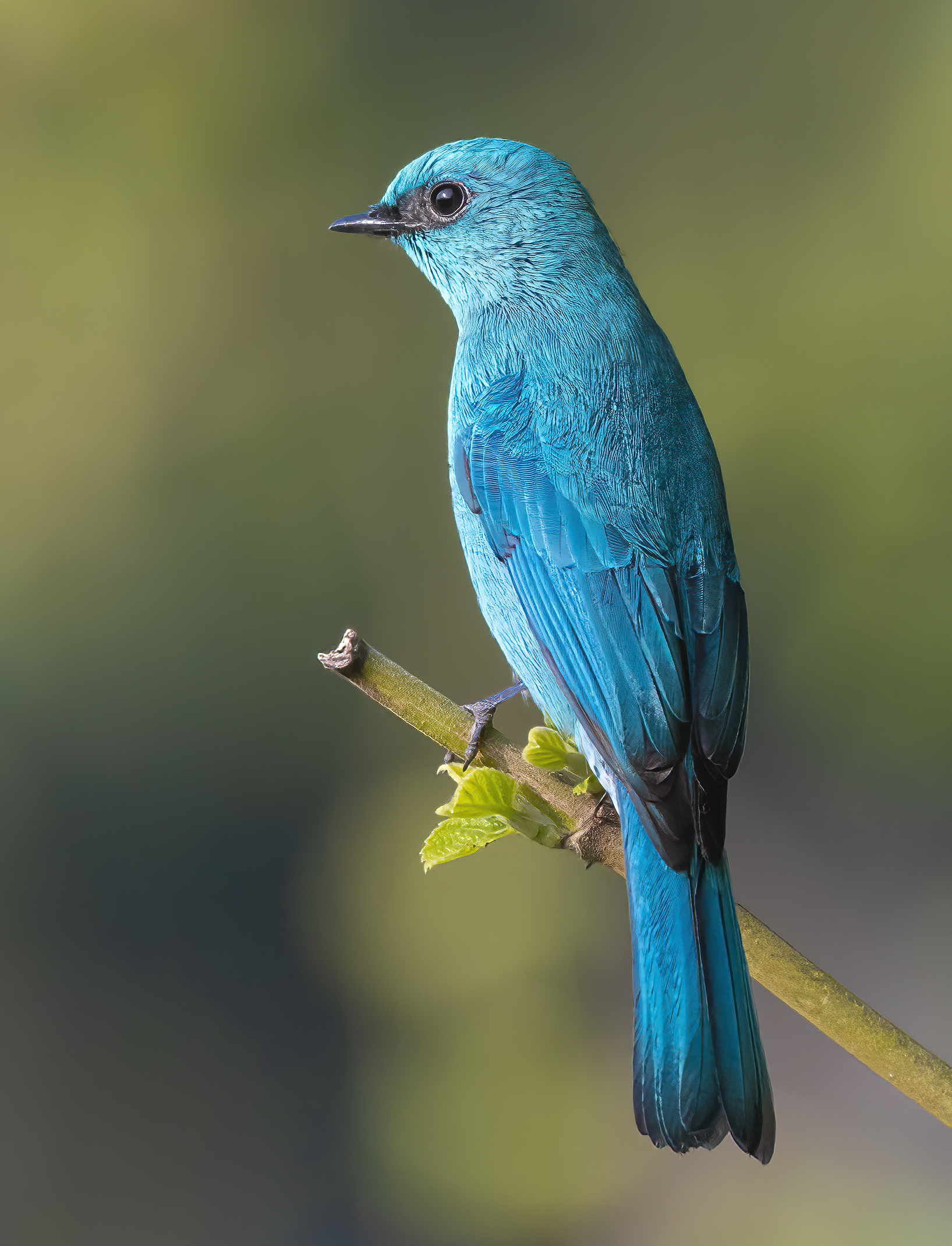
- Verditer flycatcher at Naogaon, Bangladesh

Conservation status
- Least Concern (IUCN 3.1)

Scientific classification
- Kingdom: Animalia
- Phylum: Chordata
- Class: Aves
- Order: Passeriformes
- Family: Muscicapidae
- Genus: Eumyias
- Species: E. thalassinus

Binomial name
- Eumyias thalassinus (Swainson, 1838)

Synonyms
- Stoparola melanops Eumyias thalassina

= Verditer flycatcher =

Species of bird

The verditer flycatcher (Eumyias thalassinus) is an Old World flycatcher. It is found from the Himalayas through Southeast Asia to Sumatra. This species is named after its distinctive shade of copper-sulphate blue and has a dark patch between the eyes and above the bill base. The adult males are intense blue on all areas of the body, except for the black eye-patch and grey vent. Adult females and sub-adults are lighter blue.

The verditer flycatcher is also interesting among the flycatchers in that they forage above the canopy level and perch on electric wires or exposed tree top branches.

This species was earlier placed in the genus Muscicapa and it has been suggested that it is closer to the Niltava flycatchers.

== Gallery ==
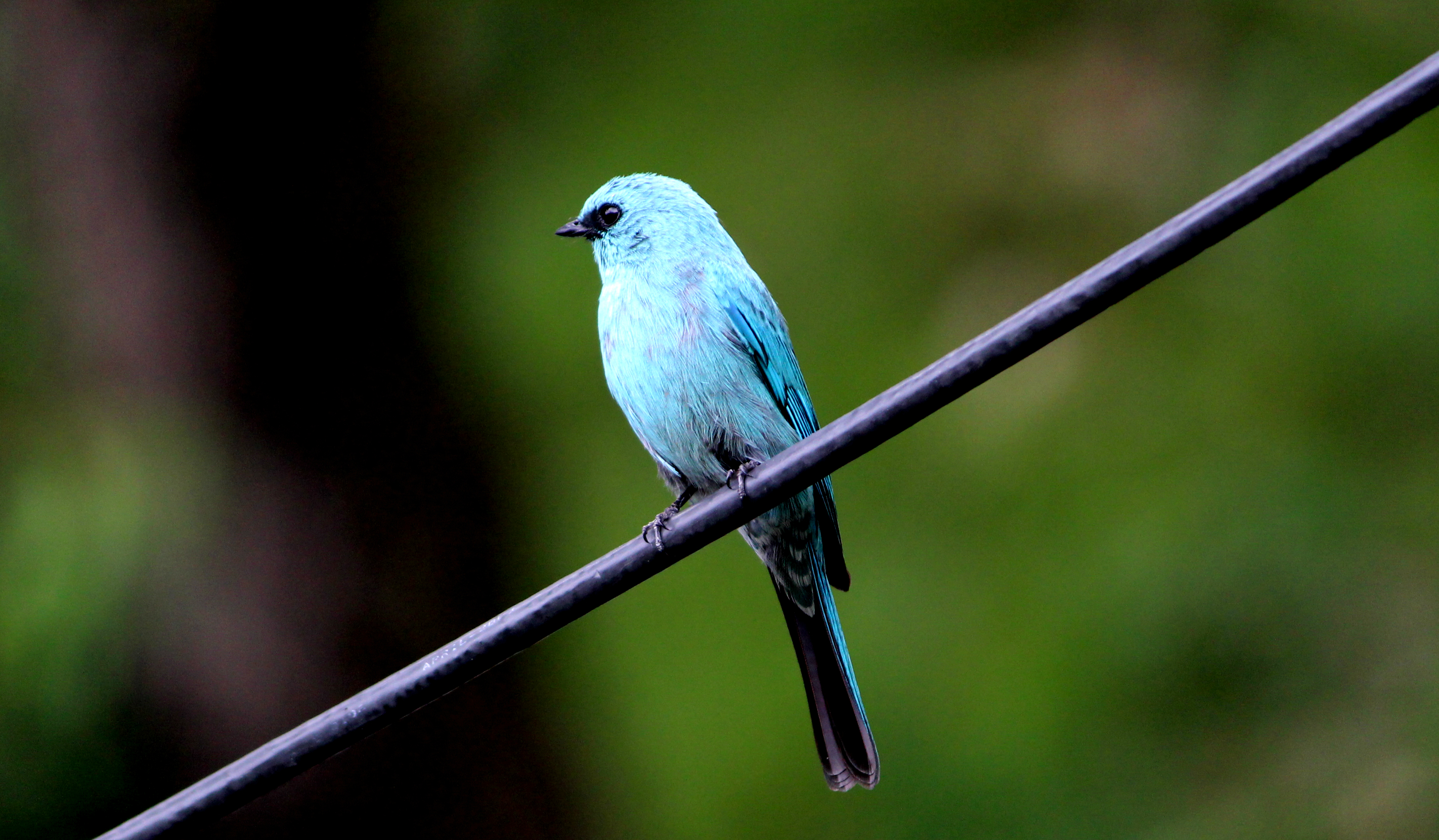
At Kalatop Khajjiar Sanctuary, Dalhousie, Himachal Pradesh, India

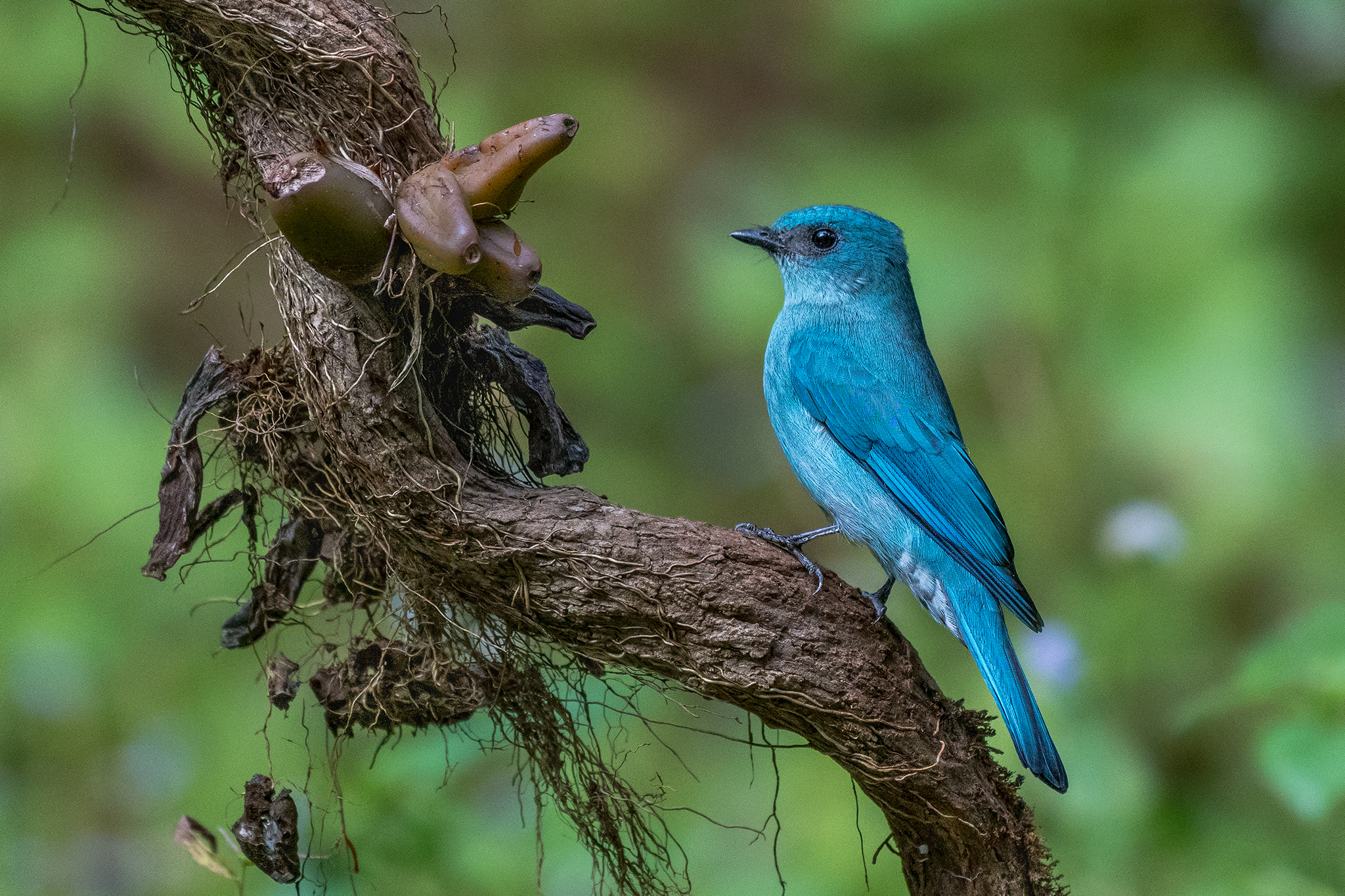
At Dandeli, Karnataka, India

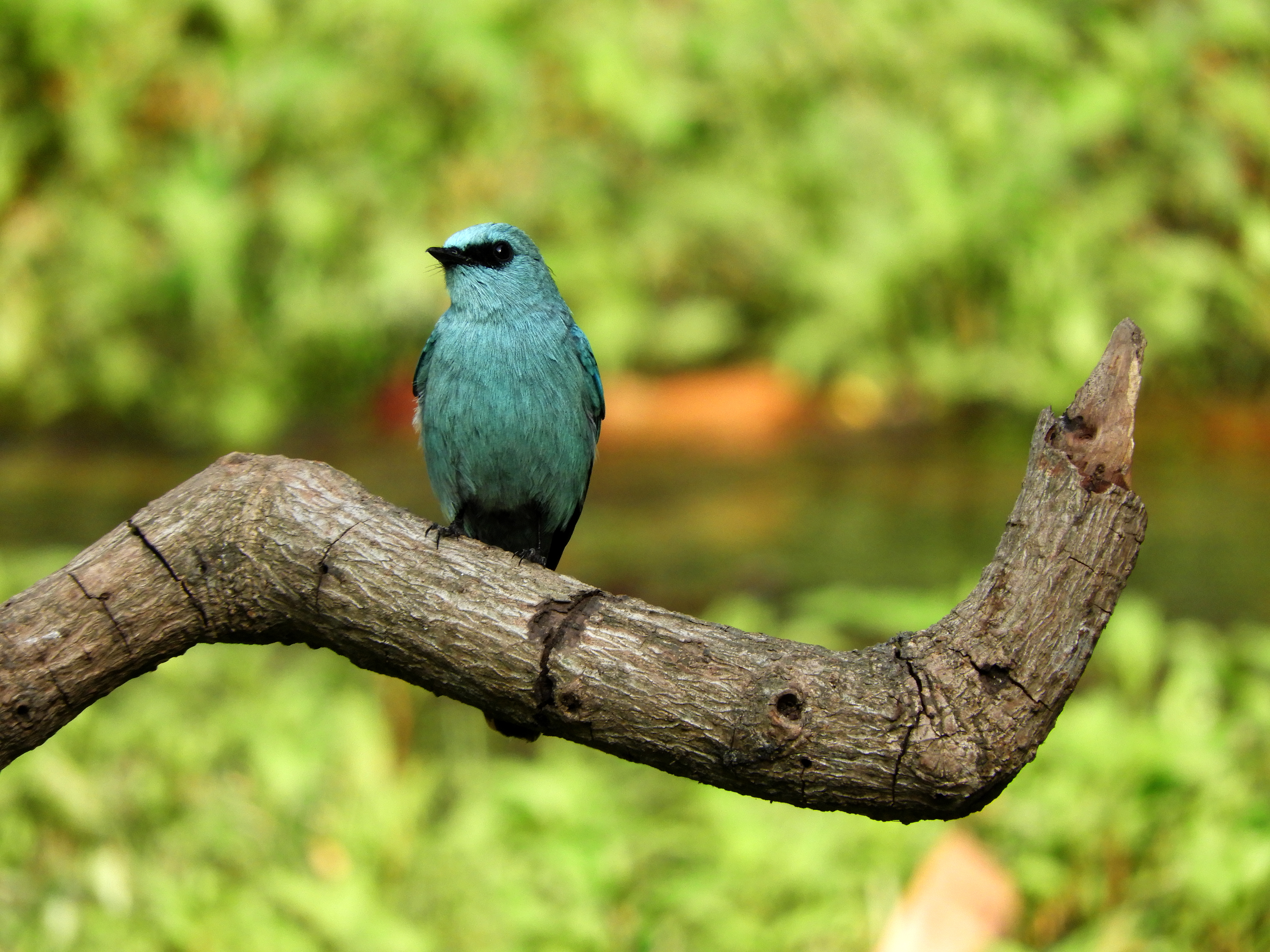
At Sattal, Uttarakhand, India

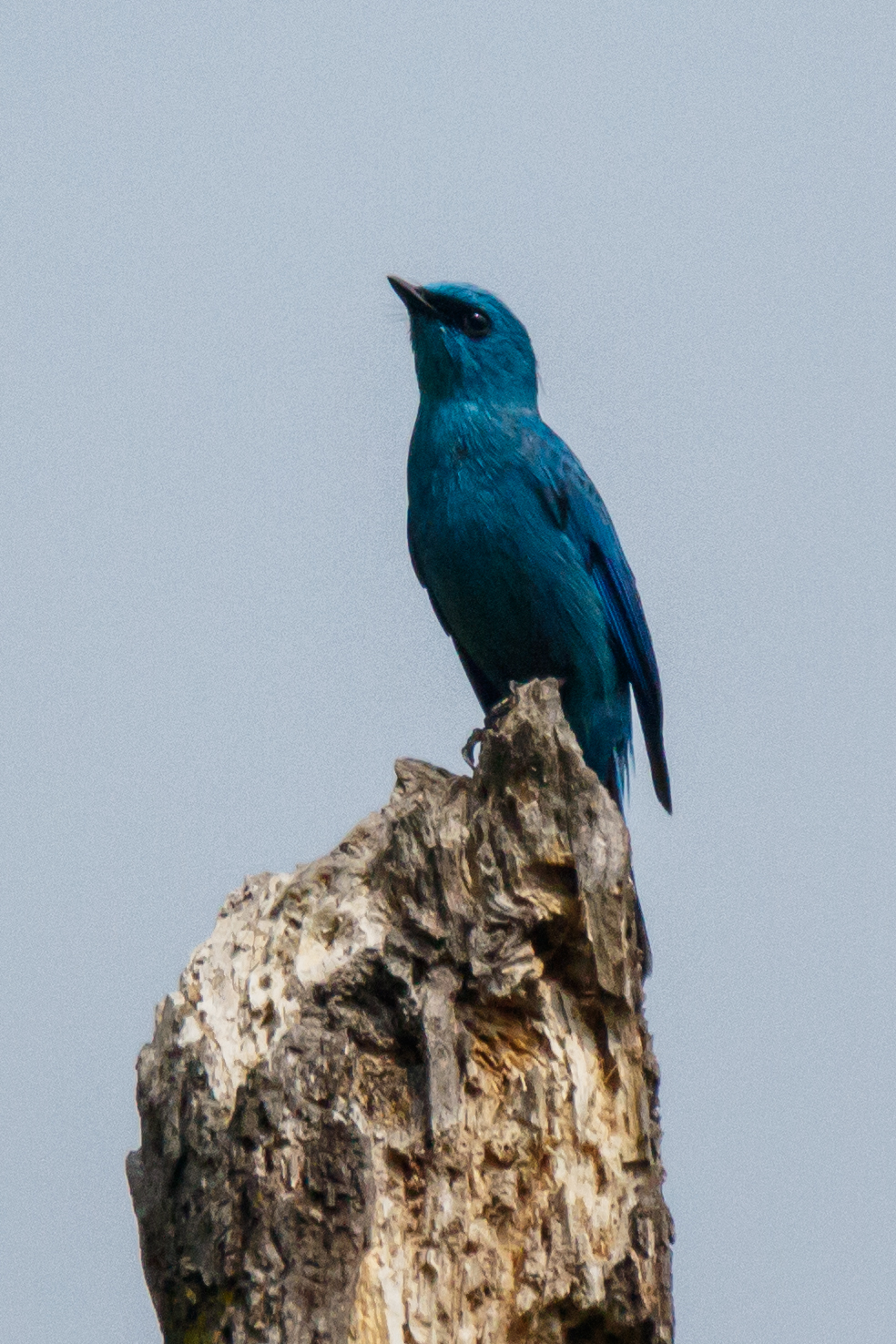
In Nepal

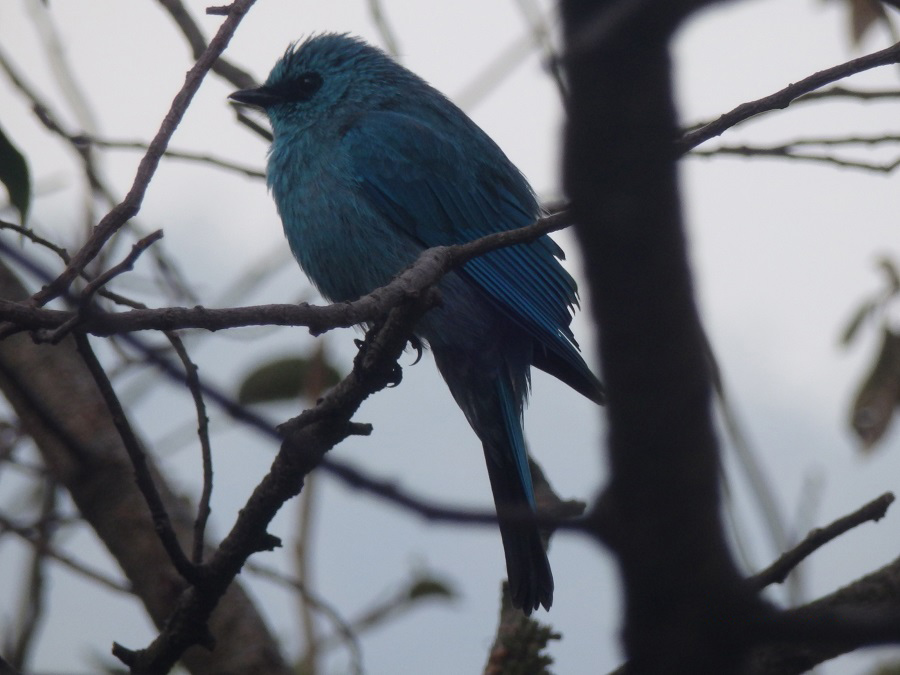
Verditer flycatcher near Nainital
