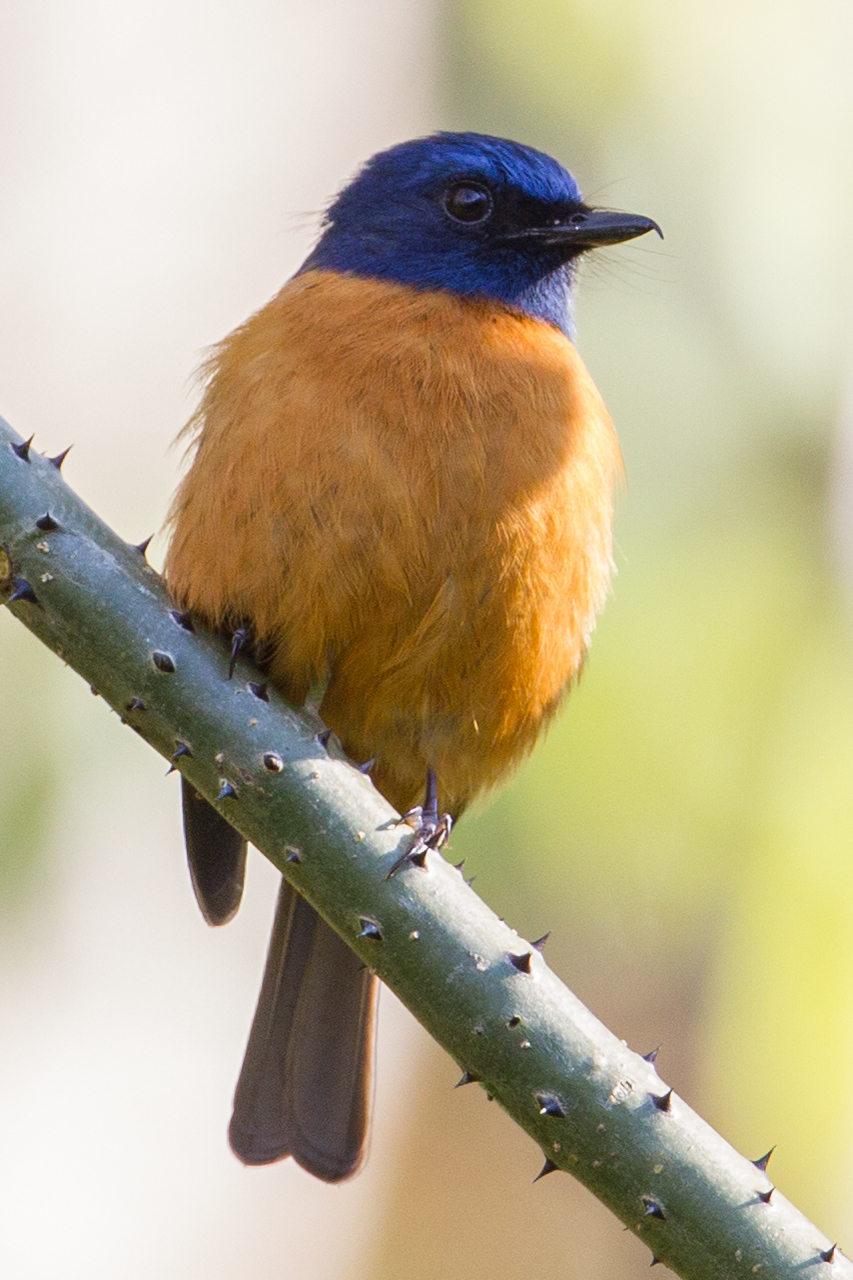
- Blue-fronted Flycatcher in Indonesia

Conservation status
- Least Concern (IUCN 3.1)

Scientific classification
- Kingdom: Animalia
- Phylum: Chordata
- Class: Aves
- Order: Passeriformes
- Family: Muscicapidae
- Genus: Eumyias
- Species: E. hoevelli

Binomial name
- Eumyias hoevelli (Meyer, AB, 1903)

= Blue-fronted blue flycatcher =

Species of bird

The blue-fronted blue flycatcher (Eumyias hoevelli), also known as the blue-fronted flycatcher, is a species of bird in the family Muscicapidae. It is endemic to Indonesia. Its natural habitat is subtropical or tropical moist montane forests.
