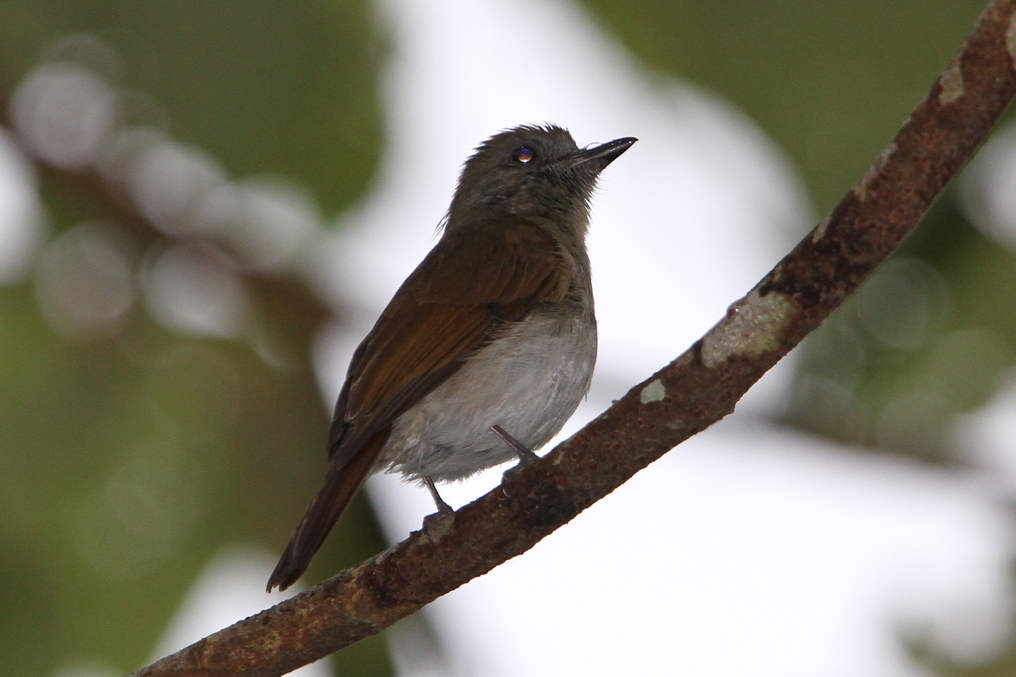

Conservation status
- Least Concern (IUCN 3.1)

Scientific classification
- Kingdom: Animalia
- Phylum: Chordata
- Class: Aves
- Order: Passeriformes
- Family: Muscicapidae
- Genus: Eumyias
- Species: E. stresemanni

Binomial name
- Eumyias stresemanni (Siebers, 1928)

= Sumba jungle flycatcher =

Species of bird

The Sumba jungle flycatcher (Eumyias stresemanni) is a passerine bird in the Old World flycatcher family Muscicapidae that is endemic to Sumba.

The Sumba jungle flycatcher was split as distinct species from the russet-backed jungle flycatcher (Eumyias oscillans) by the IOC in 2021.
