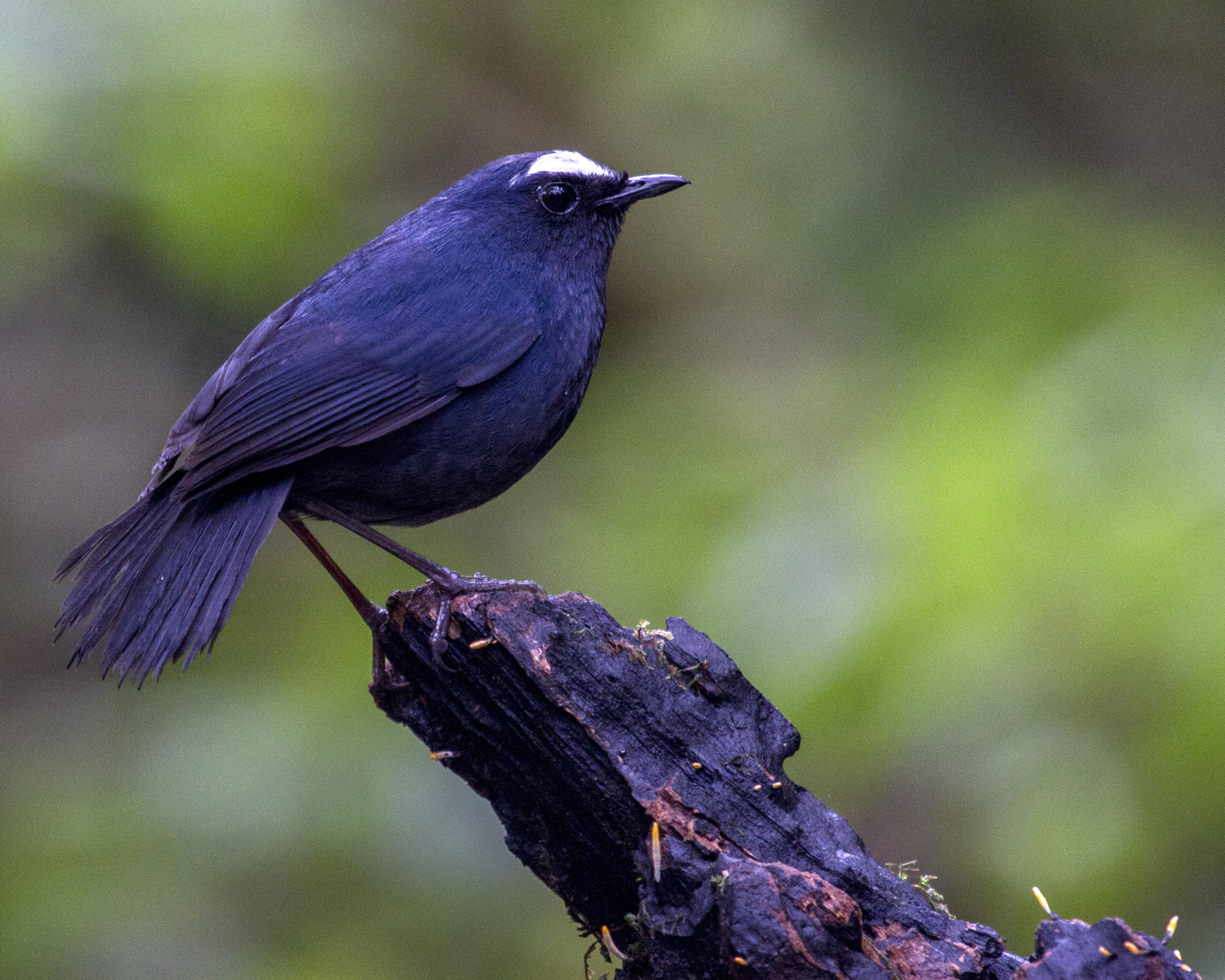
- Male in Thailand.

Conservation status
- Least Concern (IUCN 3.1)

Scientific classification
- Kingdom: Animalia
- Phylum: Chordata
- Class: Aves
- Order: Passeriformes
- Family: Muscicapidae
- Genus: Brachypteryx
- Species: B. cruralis

Binomial name
- Brachypteryx cruralis (Blyth, 1843)

= Himalayan shortwing =

Species of bird

The Himalayan shortwing (Brachypteryx cruralis) is a species of chat. This species is now classified in the family Muscicapidae.

It is found in South-east Asia from the Himalayas to southern China, northwestern Thailand and northern Indochina. Its natural habitat is subtropical or tropical moist montane forests. It is a shy skulker, preferring to be on or near the ground, in the depths of dark vegetation, where it feeds on small insects, larvae, berries, seeds, sprouts and new buds of plants. The nest consists of moss and grass stems, placed in a dense shrub.
