= Thomas Fulton Bourdillon =

Indian conservationist

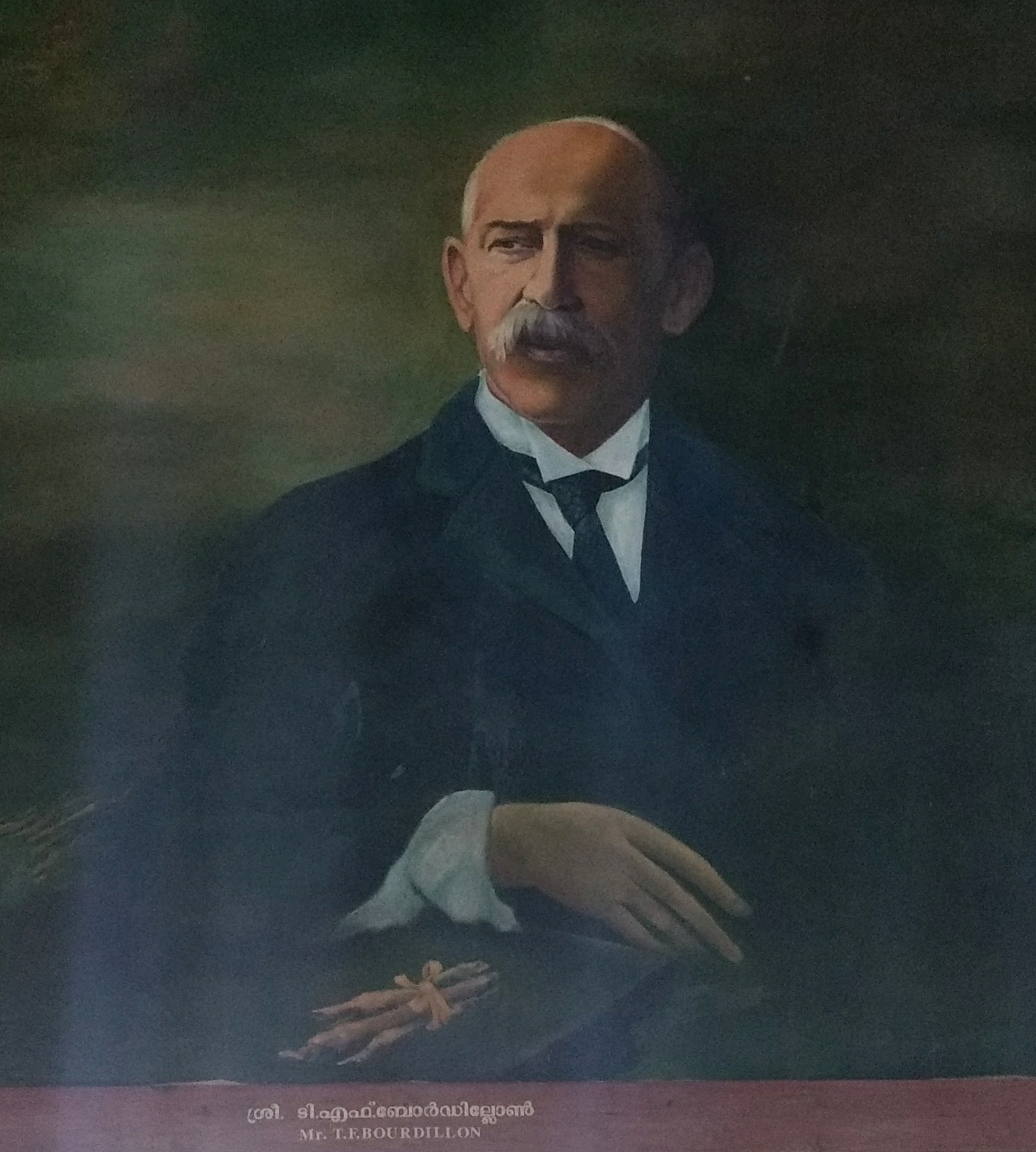
Portrait from the Teak Museum, Nilambur.

Thomas Fulton Bourdillon (1 May 1849, Madras – 19 December 1930, Bexhill-on-Sea) was a British botanist, who worked as a Conservator of Forests in the princely state of Travancore in British India.

He came to Travancore (at present Southern Kerala) as a planter in 1871 and was appointed by the Travancore Durbar in 1886 as a special forest officer to explore the forests and to report on their resources. In 1891 he was appointed as Conservator of Forests, a position he retained till his retirement in June 1908. He was a keen botanist and an all-round forest officer. During his period, he brought the Department to a high state of efficiency.

In 1908, he authored the first book on the trees of the region The Forest Trees of Travancore. In 1901 he was admitted a Fellow of the Linnean Society. He also wrote about bird life to Allan Octavian Hume and contributed many articles on forestry to the Indian Forester. He worked in close association with other naturalists of his time including R. H. Beddome and Harold S. Ferguson.

Today there exists in Arienkavu on the northern side of Shendurney valley a place called Bourdillon's Plot which was the location of the first plot where teak was planted using stumps in 1891. This technique was developed to grow teak sustainably for the needs of the navy. This attempt to grow teak for the needs of the Royal Navy was started by Mr. H. V. Conolly, the then Collector of Malabar.

The tree species Aglaia bourdillonii, bird subspecies great eared-nightjar Eurostopodus macrotis bourdilloni and the blackbird Turdus merula bourdilloni are named after him.
