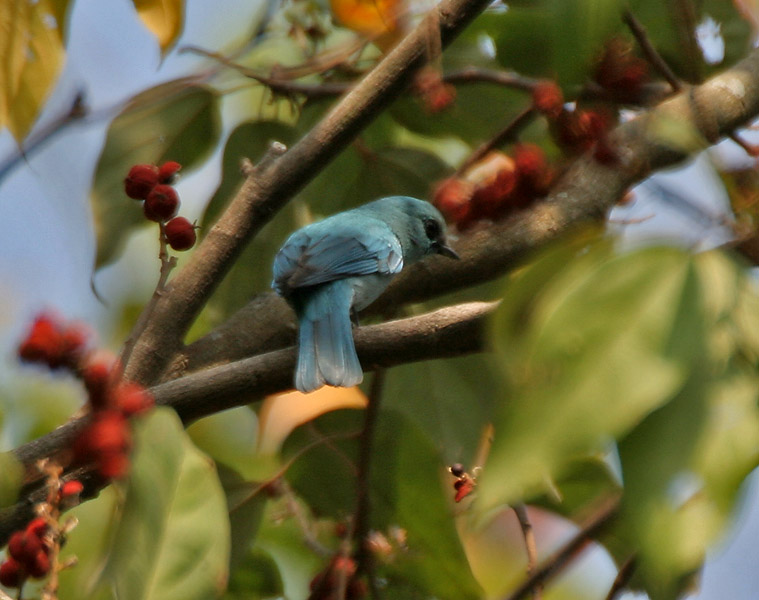
- Verditer flycatcher (Eumyias thalassinus)

Scientific classification
- Kingdom: Animalia
- Phylum: Chordata
- Class: Aves
- Order: Passeriformes
- Family: Muscicapidae
- Genus: Eumyias; Cabanis, 1851

Type species
- Muscicapa indigo Horsfield, 1821

= Eumyias =

Genus of birds

Eumyias is a genus of birds in the Old World flycatcher family Muscicapidae.

== Taxonomy ==
The genus Eumyias was introduced in 1851 by the German ornithologist Jean Cabanis to accommodate a single species, Muscicapa indigo, the indigo flycatcher, that had been described by Thomas Horsfield in 1821. The genus name Eumyias combines the Ancient Greek ευ/eu meaning "fine" or "beauty" with the Modern Latin myias meaning "flycatcher".

The Buru jungle flycatcher was previously placed in the genus Rhinomyias but was moved to Eumyias when a 2010 molecular phylogenetic study found that Rhinomyias was polyphyletic.

The genus contains the following 11 species:

Image	Common name	Scientific name	Distribution
	Nilgiri flycatcher	Eumyias albicaudatus	Western Ghats
	Indigo flycatcher	Eumyias indigo	montane Sumatra, Java and Borneo
	Verditer flycatcher	Eumyias thalassinus	Indomalaya
	Buru jungle flycatcher	Eumyias additus	Buru
	Turquoise flycatcher	Eumyias panayensis	Sulawesi, Moluccas and Philippines
	Matinan blue flycatcher	Eumyias sanfordi	north Sulawesi
	Blue-fronted blue flycatcher	Eumyias hoevelli	montane Sulawesi
	Timor blue flycatcher	Eumyias hyacinthinus	Timor
	Flores jungle flycatcher	Eumyias oscillans	Flores and Sumbawa
	Sumba jungle flycatcher	Eumyias stresemanni	Sumba
	Dull-blue flycatcher	Eumyias sordidus	central Sri Lanka
