= List of birds of Asia =

The birds of Asia are diverse. The avifauna of Asia includes 3845 species.

The taxonomy of this list adheres to James Clements's Birds of the World: A Checklist, 2022 edition. Taxonomic changes are ongoing; as more research is gathered from studies of distribution, behaviour, and DNA, the order and number of families and species may change. Furthermore, different approaches to ornithological nomenclature have led to concurrent systems of classification (see Sibley-Ahlquist taxonomy).

The area includes Russia east of the Ural River and the Ural Mountains and the Russian Arctic islands east of Novaya Zemlya, as well as Kazakhstan, Georgia, Azerbaijan, and Turkey. The area is separated from Africa by the Suez Canal. In the Indian Ocean it includes Sri Lanka, Lakshadweep (the Laccadive Islands), the Andaman and Nicobar Islands. It includes the Russian islands in the Bering Sea and North Pacific, Japan, the Izu Islands, the Ryukyu Islands, Taiwan, the Philippines, Malaysia and Indonesia.

The following tags have been used to highlight several categories. The commonly occurring native species do not fall into any of these categories.

- (A) Accidental – a species that rarely or accidentally occurs in Asia
- (I) Introduced – a species introduced to Asia as a consequence, direct or indirect, of human actions
- (Ex) Extirpated – a species that no longer occurs in Asia although populations exist elsewhere
- (X) Extinct – a species or subspecies that no longer exists.

== Ostriches ==
Order: Struthioniformes Family: Struthionidae

The ostrich is a flightless bird native to Africa. It is the largest living species of bird. It is distinctive in its appearance, with a long neck and legs and the ability to run at high speeds.

- Common ostrich, Struthio camelus
  - Arabian ostrich, Struthio camelus syriacus (X)
  - North African ostrich, Struthio camelus camelus (I)

== Cassowaries and emu ==
Order: Struthioniformes Family: Casuariidae

The cassowaries are large flightless birds native to Australia and New Guinea.

- Southern cassowary, Casuarius casuarius
- Dwarf cassowary, Casuarius bennetti
- Northern cassowary, Casuarius unappendiculatus

== Magpie goose ==
Order: Anseriformes Family: Anseranatidae

The family contains a single species, the magpie goose. It was an early and distinctive offshoot of the anseriform family tree, diverging after the screamers and before all other ducks, geese and swans, sometime in the late Cretaceous.

- Magpie goose, Anseranas semipalmata

== Ducks, geese, and waterfowl ==
Order: Anseriformes Family: Anatidae

Anatidae includes the ducks and most duck-like waterfowl, such as geese and swans. These birds are adapted to an aquatic existence with webbed feet, flattened bills, and feathers that are excellent at shedding water due to an oily coating.

- Spotted whistling-duck, Dendrocygna guttata
- Plumed whistling-duck, Dendrocygna eytoni (A)
- Fulvous whistling-duck, Dendrocygna bicolor
- Wandering whistling-duck, Dendrocygna arcuata
- Lesser whistling-duck, Dendrocygna javanica
- White-faced whistling-duck, Dendrocygna viduata
- Bar-headed goose, Anser indicus
- Emperor goose, Anser canagicus
- Snow goose, Anser caerulescens
- Ross's goose, Anser rossii (A)
- Graylag goose, Anser anser
- Swan goose, Anser cygnoides
- Greater white-fronted goose, Anser albifrons
- Lesser white-fronted goose, Anser erythropus
- Taiga bean-goose, Anser fabalis
- Tundra bean-goose, Anser serrirostris
- Pink-footed goose, Anser brachyrhynchus (A)
- Brant, Branta bernicla
- Barnacle goose, Branta leucopsis
- Cackling goose, Branta hutchinsii
- Canada goose, Branta canadensis (A)
- Red-breasted goose, Branta ruficollis
- Mute swan, Cygnus olor
- Black swan, Cygnus atratus
- Trumpeter swan, Cygnus buccinator
- Tundra swan, Cygnus columbianus
- Whooper swan, Cygnus cygnus
- Black-necked swan, Cygnus melancoryphus
- Knob-billed duck, Sarkidiornis melanotos
- Radjah shelduck, Radjah radjah
- Egyptian goose, Alopochen aegyptiaca
- Ruddy shelduck, Tadorna ferruginea
- Australian shelduck, Tadorna tadornoides
- Common shelduck, Tadorna tadorna
- Crested shelduck, Tadorna cristata
- Paradise shelduck, Tadorna variegata
- Green pygmy-goose, Nettapus pulchellus
- Cotton pygmy-goose, Nettapus coromandelianus
- Mandarin duck, Aix galericulata
- Wood duck, Aix sponsa
- Salvadori's teal, Salvadorina waigiuensis
- Baikal teal, Sibirionetta formosa
- Garganey, Spatula querquedula
- Blue-winged teal, Spatula discors (A)
- Northern shoveler, Spatula clypeata
- Australian shoveler, Spatula rhynchotis
- Blue-billed teal, Spatula hottentota
- Silver teal, Spatula versicolor
- Cinnamon teal, Spatula cyanoptera
- Cape shoveler, Spatula smithii
- Red shoveler, Spatula platalea
- Gadwall, Mareca strepera
- Falcated duck, Mareca falcata
- Eurasian wigeon, Mareca penelope
- American wigeon, Mareca americana (A)
- Chiloe wigeon, Mareca sibilatrix
- Pacific black duck, Anas superciliosa
- Philippine duck, Anas luzonica
- Indian spot-billed duck, Anas poecilorhyncha
- Eastern spot-billed duck, Anas zonorhyncha
- Mallard, Anas platyrhynchos
- American black duck, Anas rubripes (A)
- Northern pintail, Anas acuta
- Green-winged teal, Anas crecca
- Andaman teal, Anas albogularis
- Sunda teal, Anas gibberifrons
- Gray teal, Anas gracilis
- White-cheeked pintail, Anas bahamensis
- Chestnut teal, Anas castanea
- Cape teal, Anas capensis (A)
- Red-billed duck, Anas erythrorhyncha
- Yellow-billed duck, Anas undulata
- Yellow-billed pintail, Anas georgica
- Yellow-billed teal, Anas flavirostris
- Hawaiian duck, Anas wyvilliana
- Laysan duck, Anas laysanensis
- Marbled teal, Marmaronetta angustirostris
- Pink-headed duck, Rhodonessa caryophyllacea
- White-winged duck, Asarcornis scutulata
- Red-crested pochard, Netta rufina
- Southern pochard, Netta erythrophthalma
- Rosy-billed pochard, Netta peposaca
- Canvasback, Aythya valisineria
- Redhead, Aythya americana
- Common pochard, Aythya ferina
- Ring-necked duck, Aythya collaris (A)
- Ferruginous duck, Aythya nyroca
- Baer's pochard, Aythya baeri
- Hardhead, Aythya australis
- Tufted duck, Aythya fuligula
- Greater scaup, Aythya marila
- Lesser scaup, Aythya affinis
- New Zealand scaup, Aythya novaeseelandiae
- Steller's eider, Polysticta stelleri
- Spectacled eider, Somateria fischeri
- King eider, Somateria spectabilis
- Common eider, Somateria mollissima
- Harlequin duck, Histrionicus histrionicus
- Surf scoter, Melanitta perspicillata
- Velvet scoter, Melanitta fusca
- White-winged scoter, Melanitta deglandi (A)
- Stejneger's scoter, Melanitta stejnegeri
- Common scoter, Melanitta nigra
- Black scoter, Melanitta americana
- Long-tailed duck, Clangula hyemalis
- Bufflehead, Bucephala albeola
- Common goldeneye, Bucephala clangula
- Barrow's goldeneye, Bucephala islandica
- Smew, Mergellus albellus
- Hooded merganser, Lophodytes cucullatus (A)
- Common merganser, Mergus merganser
- Red-breasted merganser, Mergus serrator
- Scaly-sided merganser, Mergus squamatus
- Ruddy duck, Oxyura jamaicensis (I)
- White-headed duck, Oxyura leucocephala
- Blue-billed duck, Oxyura australis
- Maccoa duck, Oxyura maccoa
- Lake duck, Oxyura vittata
- Maned duck, Chenonetta jubata
- Spur-winged goose, Plectropterus gambensis

== Megapodes ==
Order: Galliformes Family: Megapodiidae

The Megapodiidae are stocky, medium-large chicken-like birds with small heads and large feet. All but the malleefowl occupy jungle habitats and most have brown or black colouring.

- Wattled brushturkey, Aepypodius arfakianus
- Waigeo brushturkey, Aepypodius bruijnii
- Red-billed brushturkey, Talegalla cuvieri
- Yellow-legged brushturkey, Talegalla fuscirostris
- Red-legged brushturkey, Talegalla jobiensis
- Maleo, Macrocephalon maleo
- Moluccan scrubfowl, Eulipoa wallacei
- Nicobar scrubfowl, Megapodius nicobariensis
- Tabon scrubfowl, Megapodius cumingii
- Sula scrubfowl, Megapodius bernsteinii
- Tanimbar scrubfowl, Megapodius tenimberensis
- Dusky scrubfowl, Megapodius freycinet
- Biak scrubfowl, Megapodius geelvinkianus
- Forsten's scrubfowl, Megapodius forsteni
- New Guinea scrubfowl, Megapodius decollatus
- Orange-footed scrubfowl, Megapodius reinwardt
- Melanesian scrubfowl, Megapodius eremita
- Vanuatu scrubfowl, Megapodius layardi
- Tongan megapode, Megapodius pritchardii
- Micronesian scrubfowl, Megapodius laperouse
- Malleefowl, Leipoa ocellata

== Guineafowl ==
Order: Galliformes Family: Numididae

The guineafowl are a family of birds native to Africa. They typically eat insects and seeds, are ground-nesting, and resemble partridges, except with featherless heads.

- Helmeted guineafowl, Numida meleagris (I)
- Vulturine guineafowl, Acryllium vulturinum

== New World quail ==
- Northern bobwhite, Colinus virginianus (I)

== Pheasants, grouse, and allies ==
Order: Galliformes Family: Phasianidae

The Phasianidae are a family of terrestrial birds. In general, they are plump (although they vary in size) and have broad, relatively short wings.

- Ferruginous partridge, Caloperdix oculeus
- Crested partridge, Rollulus rouloul
- Black partridge, Melanoperdix niger
- Hill partridge, Arborophila torqueola
- Sichuan partridge, Arborophila rufipectus
- Chestnut-breasted partridge, Arborophila mandellii
- White-necklaced partridge, Arborophila gingica
- Rufous-throated partridge, Arborophila rufogularis
- White-cheeked partridge, Arborophila atrogularis
- Taiwan partridge, Arborophila crudigularis
- Hainan partridge, Arborophila ardens
- Chestnut-bellied partridge, Arborophila javanica
- Malayan partridge, Arborophila campbelli
- Roll's partridge, Arborophila rolli
- Sumatran partridge, Arborophila sumatrana
- Gray-breasted partridge, Arborophila orientalis
- Bar-backed partridge, Arborophila brunneopectus
- Orange-necked partridge, Arborophila davidi
- Chestnut-headed partridge, Arborophila cambodiana
- Red-breasted partridge, Arborophila hyperythra
- Red-billed partridge, Arborophila rubrirostris
- Scaly-breasted partridge, Tropicoperdix chloropus
- Chestnut-necklaced partridge, Tropicoperdix charltonii
- Sabah partridge, Tropicoperdix graydoni
- Long-billed partridge, Rhizothera longirostris
- Dulit Partridge, Rhizothera dulitensis
- Vietnamese crested argus, Rheinardia ocellata
- Malayan crested argus, Rheinardia nigrescens
- Great argus, Argusianus argus
- Indian peafowl, Pavo cristatus
- Green peafowl, Pavo muticus (A)
- Crimson-headed partridge, Haematortyx sanguiniceps
- Red spurfowl, Galloperdix spadicea
- Painted spurfowl, Galloperdix lunulata
- Sri Lanka spurfowl, Galloperdix bicalcarata
- Palawan peacock-pheasant, Polyplectron napoleonis
- Malayan peacock-pheasant, Polyplectron malacense
- Bornean peacock-pheasant, Polyplectron schleiermacheri
- Germain's peacock-pheasant, Polyplectron germaini
- Hainan peacock-pheasant, Polyplectron katsumatae
- Mountain peacock-pheasant, Polyplectron inopinatum
- Bronze-tailed peacock-pheasant, Polyplectron chalcurum
- Gray peacock-pheasant, Polyplectron bicalcaratum
- See-see partridge, Ammoperdix griseogularis
- Sand partridge, Ammoperdix heyi
- Brown quail, Synoicus ypsilophorus
- Blue-breasted quail, Synoicus chinensis
- Blue quail, Synoicus adansonii
- Snow Mountain quail, Synoicus monorthonyx
- Japanese quail, Coturnix japonica
- Common quail, Coturnix coturnix
- Harlequin quail, Coturnix delegorguei
- Rain quail, Coturnix coromandelica
- Stubble quail, Coturnix pectoralis
- Rock partridge, Alectoris graeca
- Chukar, Alectoris chukar
- Philby's partridge, Alectoris philbyi
- Przevalski's partridge, Alectoris magna
- Arabian partridge, Alectoris melanocephala
- Barbary partridge, Alectoris barbara
- Red-legged partridge, Alectoris rufa
- Caucasian snowcock, Tetraogallus caucasicus
- Caspian snowcock, Tetraogallus caspius
- Altai snowcock, Tetraogallus altaicus
- Tibetan snowcock, Tetraogallus tibetanus
- Himalayan snowcock, Tetraogallus himalayensis
- Jungle bush-quail, Perdicula asiatica
- Rock bush-quail, Perdicula argoondah
- Painted bush-quail, Perdicula erythrorhyncha
- Manipur bush-quail, Perdicula manipurensis
- Himalayan quail, Ophrysia superciliosa
- Black francolin, Francolinus francolinus
- Painted francolin, Francolinus pictus
- Chinese francolin, Francolinus pintadeanus
- Mountain bamboo-partridge, Bambusicola fytchii
- Chinese bamboo-partridge, Bambusicola thoracicus
- Taiwan bamboo-partridge, Bambusicola sonorivox
- Red junglefowl, Gallus gallus
- Gray junglefowl, Gallus sonneratii
- Sri Lanka junglefowl, Gallus lafayettii
- Green junglefowl, Gallus varius
- Blood pheasant, Ithaginis cruentus
- Himalayan monal, Lophophorus impejanus
- Sclater's monal, Lophophorus sclateri
- Chinese monal, Lophophorus lhuysii
- Snow partridge, Lerwa lerwa
- Verreaux's partridge, Tetraophasis obscurus
- Szechenyi's partridge, Tetraophasis szechenyii
- Western tragopan, Tragopan melanocephalus
- Satyr tragopan, Tragopan satyra
- Blyth's tragopan, Tragopan blythii
- Temminck's tragopan, Tragopan temminckii
- Cabot's tragopan, Tragopan caboti
- Reeves's pheasant, Syrmaticus reevesii
- Copper pheasant, Syrmaticus soemmerringii
- Mikado pheasant, Syrmaticus mikado
- Elliot's pheasant, Syrmaticus ellioti
- Hume's pheasant, Syrmaticus humiae
- Golden pheasant, Chrysolophus pictus
- Lady Amherst's pheasant, Chrysolophus amherstiae
- Ring-necked pheasant, Phasianus colchicus
- Tibetan eared-pheasant, Crossoptilon harmani
- White eared-pheasant, Crossoptilon crossoptilon
- Brown eared-pheasant, Crossoptilon mantchuricum
- Blue eared-pheasant, Crossoptilon auritum
- Cheer pheasant, Catreus wallichii
- Silver pheasant, Lophura nycthemera
- Kalij pheasant, Lophura leucomelanos
- Siamese fireback, Lophura diardi
- Bulwer's pheasant, Lophura bulweri
- Edwards's pheasant, Lophura edwardsi
- Swinhoe's pheasant, Lophura swinhoii
- Salvadori's pheasant, Lophura inornata
- Malayan crestless fireback, Lophura erythrophthalma
- Bornean crestless fireback, Lophura pyronota
- Malayan crested fireback, Lophura rufa
- Bornean crested fireback, Lophura ignita
- Gray partridge, Perdix perdix
- Daurian partridge, Perdix dauurica (Ex)
- Tibetan partridge, Perdix hodgsoniae
- Koklass pheasant, Pucrasia macrolopha
- Black-billed capercaillie, Tetrao urogalloides
- Western capercaillie, Tetrao urogallus
- Black grouse, Lyrurus tetrix
- Caucasian grouse, Lyrurus mlokosiewiczi
- Hazel grouse, Tetrastes bonasia
- Severtzov's grouse, Tetrastes sewerzowi
- Siberian grouse, Falcipennis falcipennis
- Willow ptarmigan, Lagopus lagopus
- Rock ptarmigan, Lagopus muta
- Yellow-necked francolin, Pternistis leucoscepus
- Red-necked francolin, Pternistis afer
- Erckel's francolin, Pternistis erckelii
- Gray francolin, Ortygornis pondicerianus

== Flamingos ==
Order: Phoenicopteriformes Family: Phoenicopteridae

Flamingos are gregarious wading birds, usually 3 to 5 feet (0.9 to 1.5 m) tall, found in both the Western and Eastern Hemispheres. Flamingos filter-feed on shellfish and algae. Their oddly shaped beaks are specially adapted to separate mud and silt from the food they consume and, uniquely, are used upside-down.

- Greater flamingo, Phoenicopterus roseus
- Lesser flamingo, Phoeniconaias minor

== Grebes ==
Order: Podicipediformes Family: Podicipedidae

Grebes are small to medium-large freshwater diving birds. They have lobed toes and are excellent swimmers and divers. However, they have their feet placed far back on the body, making them quite ungainly on land.

- Little grebe, Tachybaptus ruficollis
- Australasian grebe, Tachybaptus novaehollandiae
- Horned grebe, Podiceps auritus
- Red-necked grebe, Podiceps grisegena
- Great crested grebe, Podiceps cristatus
- Eared grebe, Podiceps nigricollis
- Hoary-headed grebe, Poliocephalus poliocephalus
- Pied-billed grebe, Podilymbus podiceps

== Pigeons and doves ==
Order: Columbiformes Family: Columbidae

Pigeons and doves are stout-bodied birds with short necks and short slender bills with a fleshy cere.

- Rock pigeon, Columba livia
- Hill pigeon, Columba rupestris
- Snow pigeon, Columba leuconota
- Speckled pigeon, Columba guinea (A)
- Stock dove, Columba oenas
- Yellow-eyed pigeon, Columba eversmanni
- Common wood-pigeon, Columba palumbus
- Rameron pigeon, Columba arquatrix
- Speckled wood-pigeon, Columba hodgsonii
- Ashy wood-pigeon, Columba pulchricollis
- Nilgiri wood-pigeon, Columba elphinstonii
- Sri Lanka wood-pigeon, Columba torringtoniae
- Pale-capped pigeon, Columba punicea
- Silvery wood-pigeon, Columba argentina
- Andaman wood-pigeon, Columba palumboides
- Japanese wood-pigeon, Columba janthina
- Ryukyu pigeon, Columba jouyi
- Bonin pigeon, Columba versicolor
- Metallic pigeon, Columba vitiensis
- Yellow-legged pigeon, Columba pallidiceps
- White-headed pigeon, Columba leucomela
- Trocaz pigeon, Columba trocaz
- Bolle's pigeon, Columba bollii
- Laurel pigeon, Columba junoniae
- European turtle-dove, Streptopelia turtur
- Dusky turtle-dove, Streptopelia lugens
- Oriental turtle-dove, Streptopelia orientalis
- Sunda collared-dove, Streptopelia bitorquata
- Philippine collared-dove, Streptopelia dusumieri
- Eurasian collared-dove, Streptopelia decaocto
- Burmese collared-dove, Streptopelia xanthocycla
- African collared-dove, Streptopelia roseogrisea
- Red-eyed dove, Streptopelia semitorquata
- Red collared-dove, Streptopelia tranquebarica
- Mourning collared-dove, Streptopelia decipiens
- Malagasy turtle-dove, Nesoenas picturatus
- Spotted dove, Spilopelia chinensis
- Laughing dove, Spilopelia senegalensis
- Barred cuckoo-dove, Macropygia unchall
- Flores Sea cuckoo-dove, Macropygia macassariensis
- Timor cuckoo-dove, Macropygia magna
- Tanimbar cuckoo-dove, Macropygia timorlaoensis
- Amboyna cuckoo-dove, Macropygia amboinensis
- Sultan's cuckoo-dove, Macropygia doreya
- Andaman cuckoo-dove, Macropygia rufipennis
- Philippine cuckoo-dove, Macropygia tenuirostris
- Ruddy cuckoo-dove, Macropygia emiliana
- Enggano cuckoo-dove, Macropygia cinnamomea
- Barusan cuckoo-dove, Macropygia modiglianii
- Black-billed cuckoo-dove, Macropygia nigrirostris
- Mackinlay's cuckoo-dove, Macropygia mackinlayi
- Little cuckoo-dove, Macropygia ruficeps
- Brown cuckoo-dove, Macropygia phasianella
- Great cuckoo-dove, Reinwardtoena reinwardti
- Pied cuckoo-dove, Reinwardtoena browni
- Crested cuckoo-dove, Reinwardtoena crassirostris
- White-faced cuckoo-dove, Turacoena manadensis
- Sula cuckoo-dove, Turacoena sulaensis
- Slaty cuckoo-dove, Turacoena modesta
- Namaqua dove, Oena capensis
- Asian emerald dove, Chalcophaps indica
- Pacific emerald dove, Chalcophaps longirostris
- Stephan's dove, Chalcophaps stephani
- New Guinea bronzewing, Henicophaps albifrons
- New Britain bronzewing, Henicophaps foersteri
- Wetar ground dove, Alopecoenas hoedtii
- Bronze ground dove, Alopecoenas beccarii
- White-bibbed ground dove, Alopecoenas jobiensis
- Shy ground dove, Alopecoenas sairi
- Marquesas ground dove, Alopecoenas rubescens
- Polynesian ground dove, Alopecoenas erypthropterus
- Zebra dove, Geopelia striata
- Peaceful dove, Geopelia placida
- Barred dove, Geopelia maugeus
- Bar-shouldered dove, Geopelia humeralis
- Diamond dove, Geopelia cuneata
- Nicobar pigeon, Caloenas nicobarica
- Sulawesi ground dove, Gallicolumba tristigmata
- Cinnamon ground dove, Gallicolumba rufigula
- Mindoro bleeding-heart, Gallicolumba platenae
- Negros bleeding-heart, Gallicolumba keayi
- Sulu bleeding-heart, Gallicolumba menagei
- Luzon bleeding-heart, Gallicolumba luzonica
- Mindanao bleeding-heart, Gallicolumba crinigera
- Thick-billed ground-pigeon, Trugon terrestris
- Pheasant pigeon, Otidiphaps nobilis
- Western crowned-pigeon, Goura cristata
- Sclater's crowned-pigeon, Goura sclaterii
- Scheepmaker's crowned-pigeon, Goura scheepmakeri
- Victoria crowned-pigeon, Goura victoria
- White-eared brown-dove, Phapitreron leucotis
- Amethyst brown-dove, Phapitreron amethystinus
- Mindanao brown-dove, Phapitreron brunneiceps
- Tawitawi brown-dove, Phapitreron cinereiceps
- Little green-pigeon, Treron olax
- Pink-necked green-pigeon, Treron vernans
- Cinnamon-headed green-pigeon, Treron fulvicollis
- Orange-breasted green-pigeon, Treron bicinctus
- Sri Lanka green-pigeon, Treron pompadora
- Gray-fronted green-pigeon, Treron affinis
- Andaman green-pigeon, Treron chloropterus
- Ashy-headed green-pigeon, Treron phayrei
- Philippine green-pigeon, Treron axillaris
- Buru green-pigeon, Treron aromaticus
- Thick-billed green-pigeon, Treron curvirostra
- Gray-cheeked green-pigeon, Treron griseicauda
- Sumba green-pigeon, Treron teysmannii
- Flores green-pigeon, Treron floris
- Timor green-pigeon, Treron psittaceus
- Large green-pigeon, Treron capellei
- Yellow-footed green-pigeon, Treron phoenicopterus
- Bruce's green-pigeon, Treron waalia
- Yellow-vented green-pigeon, Treron seimundi
- Pin-tailed green-pigeon, Treron apicauda
- Green-spectacled green-pigeon, Treron oxyurus
- Wedge-tailed green-pigeon, Treron sphenurus
- White-bellied green-pigeon, Treron sieboldii
- Whistling green-pigeon, Treron formosae
- Black-backed fruit-dove, Ptilinopus cinctus
- Red-naped fruit-dove, Ptilinopus dohertyi
- Pink-headed fruit-dove, Ptilinopus porphyreus
- Yellow-breasted fruit-dove, Ptilinopus occipitalis
- Flame-breasted fruit-dove, Ptilinopus marchei
- Cream-breasted fruit-dove, Ptilinopus merrilli
- Red-eared fruit-dove, Ptilinopus fischeri
- Jambu fruit-dove, Ptilinopus jambu
- Maroon-chinned fruit-dove, Ptilinopus epius
- Banggai fruit-dove, Ptilinopus subgularis
- Sula fruit-dove, Ptilinopus mangoliensis
- Black-chinned fruit-dove, Ptilinopus leclancheri
- Scarlet-breasted fruit-dove, Ptilinopus bernsteinii
- Wompoo fruit-dove, Ptilinopus magnificus
- Pink-spotted fruit-dove, Ptilinopus perlatus
- Ornate fruit-dove, Ptilinopus ornatus
- Orange-fronted fruit-dove, Ptilinopus aurantiifrons
- Wallace's fruit-dove, Ptilinopus wallacii
- Superb fruit-dove, Ptilinopus superbus
- Rose-crowned fruit-dove, Ptilinopus regina
- Coroneted fruit-dove, Ptilinopus coronulatus
- Beautiful fruit-dove, Ptilinopus pulchellus
- Blue-capped fruit-dove, Ptilinopus monacha
- White-breasted fruit-dove, Ptilinopus rivoli
- Yellow-bibbed fruit-dove, Ptilinopus solomonensis
- Geelvink fruit-dove, Ptilinopus speciosus
- Claret-breasted fruit-dove, Ptilinopus viridis
- Orange-bellied fruit-dove, Ptilinopus iozonus
- Gray-headed fruit-dove, Ptilinopus hyogastrus
- Carunculated fruit-dove, Ptilinopus granulifrons
- Black-naped fruit-dove, Ptilinopus melanospilus
- Dwarf fruit-dove, Ptilinopus nainus
- Negros fruit-dove, Ptilinopus arcanus
- Knob-billed fruit-dove, Ptilinopus insolitus
- Black-banded fruit-dove, Ptilinopus alligator
- Many-colored fruit-dove, Ptilinopus perousii
- Crimson-crowned fruit-dove, Ptilinopus porphyraceus
- Orange dove, Ptilinopus victor
- Golden dove, Ptilinopus luteovirens
- Velvet dove, Ptilinopus layardi
- Pink-bellied imperial-pigeon, Ducula poliocephala
- White-bellied imperial-pigeon, Ducula forsteni
- Mindoro imperial-pigeon, Ducula mindorensis
- Gray-headed imperial-pigeon, Ducula radiata
- Spotted imperial-pigeon, Ducula carola
- Green imperial-pigeon, Ducula aenea
- Enggano imperial-pigeon, Ducula oenothorax
- Nicobar imperial-pigeon, Ducula nicobarica
- Spectacled imperial-pigeon, Ducula perspicillata
- Seram imperial-pigeon, Ducula neglecta
- Elegant imperial-pigeon, Ducula concinna
- Pacific imperial-pigeon, Ducula pacifica
- Spice imperial-pigeon, Ducula myristicivora
- Geelvink imperial-pigeon, Ducula geelvinkiana
- Purple-tailed imperial-pigeon, Ducula rufigaster
- Cinnamon-bellied imperial-pigeon, Ducula basilica
- Rufescent imperial-pigeon, Ducula chalconota
- Island imperial-pigeon, Ducula pistrinaria
- Pink-headed imperial-pigeon, Ducula rosacea
- Gray imperial-pigeon, Ducula pickeringii
- Pinon's imperial-pigeon, Ducula pinon
- Collared imperial-pigeon, Ducula mullerii
- Zoe's imperial-pigeon, Ducula zoeae
- Mountain imperial-pigeon, Ducula badia
- Malabar imperial-pigeon, Ducula cuprea
- Dark-backed imperial-pigeon, Ducula lacernulata
- Timor imperial-pigeon, Ducula cineracea
- Pied imperial-pigeon, Ducula bicolor
- Torresian imperial-pigeon, Ducula spilorrhoa
- Silver-tipped imperial-pigeon, Ducula luctuosa
- Red-knobbed imperial-pigeon, Ducula rubricera
- Finsch's imperial-pigeon, Ducula finschii
- Bismarck imperial-pigeon, Ducula melanochroa
- Yellowish imperial-pigeon, Ducula subflavescens
- Christmas Island imperial-pigeon, Ducula whartoni
- Peale's imperial-pigeon, Ducula latrans
- Sombre pigeon, Cryptophaps poecilorrhoa
- Papuan mountain-pigeon, Gymnophaps albertisii
- Buru mountain-pigeon, Gymnophaps mada
- Seram mountain-pigeon, Gymnophaps stalkeri
- Pale mountain-pigeon, Gymnophaps solomonensis
- Topknot pigeon, Lopholaimus antarcticus
- Common bronzewing, Phaps chalcoptera
- Brush bronzewing, Phaps elegans
- Flock bronzewing, Phaps histrionica
- Crested pigeon, Ocyphaps lophotes
- Spinifex pigeon, Geophaps plumifera
- Squatter pigeon, Geophaps scripta
- Partridge pigeon, Geophaps smithii
- Chestnut-quilled rock-pigeon, Petrophassa rufipennis
- White-quilled rock-pigeon, Petrophassa albipennis
- Wonga pigeon, Leucosarcia melanoleuca
- New Zealand pigeon, Hemiphaga novaeseelandiae
- Black-billed Wood-dove, Turtur abyssinicus
- Tambourine dove, Turtur tympanistria
- Zenaida dove, Zenaida aurita
- Mourning dove, Zenaida macroura
- Eared dove, Zenaida auriculata
- Common ground dove, Columbina passerina

== Sandgrouse ==
Order: Pterocliformes Family: Pteroclidae

Sandgrouse have small, pigeon like heads and necks, but sturdy compact bodies. They have long pointed wings and sometimes tails and a fast direct flight. Flocks fly to watering holes at dawn and dusk. Their legs are feathered down to the toes.

- Tibetan sandgrouse, Syrrhaptes tibetanus
- Pallas's sandgrouse, Syrrhaptes paradoxus
- Pin-tailed sandgrouse, Pterocles alchata
- Chestnut-bellied sandgrouse, Pterocles exustus
- Spotted sandgrouse, Pterocles senegallus
- Black-bellied sandgrouse, Pterocles orientalis
- Crowned sandgrouse, Pterocles coronatus
- Lichtenstein's sandgrouse, Pterocles lichtensteinii
- Painted sandgrouse, Pterocles indicus
- Four-banded sandgrouse, Pterocles quadricinctus

== Bustards ==
Order: Otidiformes Family: Otididae

Bustards are large terrestrial birds mainly associated with dry open country and steppes in the Old World. They are omnivorous and nest on the ground. They walk steadily on strong legs and big toes, pecking for food as they go. They have long broad wings with "fingered" wingtips and striking patterns in flight. Many have interesting mating displays.

- Great bustard, Otis tarda
- Arabian bustard, Ardeotis arabs
- Great Indian bustard, Ardeotis nigriceps
- Australian bustard, Ardeotis australis
- MacQueen's bustard, Chlamydotis macqueenii
- Houbara bustard, Chalmydotis undulata
- Bengal florican, Houbaropsis bengalensis
- Lesser florican, Sypheotides indicus
- Little bustard, Tetrax tetrax

== Cuckoos ==
Order: Cuculiformes Family: Cuculidae

The family Cuculidae includes cuckoos, roadrunners and anis. These birds are of variable size with slender bodies, long tails and strong legs.

- Sumatran ground-cuckoo, Carpococcyx viridis
- Bornean ground-cuckoo, Carpococcyx radiatus
- Coral-billed ground-cuckoo, Carpococcyx renauldi
- Biak coucal, Centropus chalybeus
- Greater black coucal, Centropus menbeki
- Rufous coucal, Centropus unirufus
- Green-billed coucal, Centropus chlororhynchus
- Black-faced coucal, Centropus melanops
- Short-toed coucal, Centropus rectunguis
- Black-hooded coucal, Centropus steerii
- Bay coucal, Centropus celebensis
- White-browed coucal, Centropus superciliosus
- Sunda coucal, Centropus nigrorufus
- Andaman coucal, Centropus andamanensis
- Greater coucal, Centropus sinensis
- Goliath coucal, Centropus goliath
- Philippine coucal, Centropus viridis
- Lesser coucal, Centropus bengalensis
- Lesser black coucal, Centropus bernsteini
- Pheasant coucal, Centropus phasianinus
- Pied coucal, Centropus ateralbus
- Violaceous coucal, Centropus violaceus
- Senegal coucal, Centropus senegalensis
- Raffles's malkoha, Rhinortha chlorophaea
- Sirkeer malkoha, Taccocua leschenaultii
- Red-billed malkoha, Zanclostomus javanicus
- Chestnut-breasted malkoha, Phaenicophaeus curvirostris
- Chestnut-bellied malkoha, Phaenicophaeus sumatranus
- Red-faced malkoha, Phaenicophaeus pyrrhocephalus
- Blue-faced malkoha, Phaenicophaeus viridirostris
- Black-bellied malkoha, Phaenicophaeus diardi
- Green-billed malkoha, Phaenicophaeus tristis
- Yellow-billed malkoha, Rhamphococcyx calyorhynchus
- Red-crested malkoha, Dasylophus superciliosus
- Scale-feathered malkoha, Dasylophus cumingi
- Chestnut-winged cuckoo, Clamator coromandus
- Great spotted cuckoo, Clamator glandarius
- Pied cuckoo, Clamator jacobinus
- Dwarf koel, Microdynamis parva
- Asian koel, Eudynamys scolopaceus
- Black-billed koel, Eudynamys melanorhynchus
- Pacific koel, Eudynamys orientalis
- Long-tailed koel, Urodynamis taitensis
- Channel-billed cuckoo, Scythrops novaehollandiae
- Asian emerald cuckoo, Chrysococcyx maculatus
- Violet cuckoo, Chrysococcyx xanthorhynchus
- Dideric cuckoo, Chrysococcyx caprius
- Klaas's cuckoo, Chrysococcyx klaas
- Long-billed cuckoo, Chrysococcyx megarhynchus
- Horsfield's bronze-cuckoo, Chrysococcyx basalis
- Black-eared cuckoo, Chrysococcyx osculans
- Rufous-throated bronze-cuckoo, Chrysococcyx ruficollis
- Shining bronze-cuckoo, Chrysococcyx lucidus
- White-eared bronze-cuckoo, Chrysococcyx meyerii
- Little bronze-cuckoo, Chrysococcyx minutillus
- Pallid cuckoo, Cacomantis pallidus
- White-crowned koel, Cacomantis leucolophus
- Chestnut-breasted cuckoo, Cacomantis castaneiventris
- Fan-tailed cuckoo, Cacomantis flabelliformis
- Banded bay cuckoo, Cacomantis sonneratii
- Plaintive cuckoo, Cacomantis merulinus
- Gray-bellied cuckoo, Cacomantis passerinus
- Moluccan cuckoo, Cacomantis aeruginosus
- Brush cuckoo, Cacomantis variolosus
- Fork-tailed drongo-cuckoo, Surniculus dicruroides
- Philippine drongo-cuckoo, Surniculus velutinus
- Square-tailed drongo-cuckoo, Surniculus lugubris
- Moluccan drongo-cuckoo, Surniculus musschenbroeki
- Moustached hawk-cuckoo, Hierococcyx vagans
- Large hawk cuckoo, Hierococcyx sparverioides
- Dark hawk-cuckoo, Hierococcyx bocki
- Common hawk-cuckoo, Hierococcyx varius
- Northern hawk-cuckoo, Hierococcyx hyperythrus
- Philippine hawk-cuckoo, Hierococcyx pectoralis
- Hodgson's hawk-cuckoo, Hierococcyx nisicolor
- Malaysian hawk-cuckoo, Hierococcyx fugax
- Lesser cuckoo, Cuculus poliocephalus
- Sulawesi cuckoo, Cuculus crassirostris
- Indian cuckoo, Cuculus micropterus
- Himalayan cuckoo, Cuculus saturatus
- Sunda cuckoo, Cuculus lepidus
- Common cuckoo, Cuculus canorus
- Oriental cuckoo, Cuculus optatus

== Frogmouths ==
Order: Caprimulgiformes Family: Podargidae

The frogmouths are a group of nocturnal birds related to the nightjars. They are named for their large flattened hooked bill and huge frog-like gape, which they use to take insects.

- Marbled frogmouth, Podargus ocellatus
- Papuan frogmouth, Podargus papuensis
- Tawny frogmouth, Podargus strigoides
- Large frogmouth, Batrachostomus auritus
- Dulit frogmouth, Batrachostomus harterti
- Philippine frogmouth, Batrachostomus septimus
- Gould's frogmouth, Batrachostomus stellatus
- Sri Lanka frogmouth, Batrachostomus moniliger
- Hodgson's frogmouth, Batrachostomus hodgsoni
- Sumatran frogmouth, Batrachostomus poliolophus
- Bornean frogmouth, Batrachostomus mixtus
- Javan frogmouth, Batrachostomus javensis
- Blyth's frogmouth, Batrachostomus affinis
- Palawan frogmouth, Batrachostomus chaseni
- Sunda frogmouth, Batrachostomus cornutus
- Solomons frogmouth, Rigidipenna inexpectata

== Nightjars and allies ==
Order: Caprimulgiformes Family: Caprimulgidae

Nightjars are medium-sized nocturnal birds that usually nest on the ground. They have long wings, short legs and very short bills. Most have small feet, of little use for walking, and long pointed wings. Their soft plumage is camouflaged to resemble bark or leaves.

- Spotted nightjar, Eurostopodus argus
- Solomons nightjar, Eurostopodus nigripennis
- White-throated nightjar, Eurostopodus mystacalis
- Diabolical nightjar, Eurostopodus diabolicus
- Papuan nightjar, Eurostopodus papuensis
- Archbold's nightjar, Eurostopodus archboldi
- Malaysian eared-nightjar, Lyncornis temminckii
- Great eared-nightjar, Lyncornis macrotis
- Jungle nightjar, Caprimulgus indicus
- Gray nightjar, Caprimulgus jotaka
- Eurasian nightjar, Caprimulgus europaeus
- Egyptian nightjar, Caprimulgus aegyptius
- Nubian nightjar, Caprimulgus nubicus
- Sykes's nightjar, Caprimulgus mahrattensis
- Vaurie's nightjar, Caprimulgus centralasicus
- Large-tailed nightjar, Caprimulgus macrurus
- Andaman nightjar, Caprimulgus andamanicus
- Mees's nightjar, Caprimulgus meesi
- Jerdon's nightjar, Caprimulgus atripennis
- Philippine nightjar, Caprimulgus manillensis
- Sulawesi nightjar, Caprimulgus celebensis
- Indian nightjar, Caprimulgus asiaticus
- Plain nightjar, Caprimulgus inornatus
- Savanna nightjar, Caprimulgus affinis
- Bonaparte's nightjar, Caprimulgus concretus
- Salvadori's nightjar, Caprimulgus pulchellus
- Red-necked nightjar, Caprimulgus ruficollis
- Montane nightjar, Caprimulgus poliocephalus
- Golden nightjar, Caprimulgus eximius

== Owlet-nightjars ==
Order: Caprimulgiformes Family: Aegothelidae

The owlet-nightjars are small nocturnal birds related to the nightjars and frogmouths. They are insectivores which hunt mostly in the air. Their soft plumage is a mixture of browns and paler shades.

- Feline owlet-nightjar, Aegotheles insignis
- Starry owlet-nightjar, Aegotheles tatei (A)
- Wallace's owlet-nightjar, Aegotheles wallacii
- Mountain owlet-nightjar, Aegotheles albertisi
- Moluccan owlet-nightjar, Aegotheles crinifrons
- Vogelkop owlet-nightjar, Aegotheles affinis
- Barred owlet-nightjar, Aegotheles bennettii
- Australian owlet-nightjar, Aegotheles cristatus

== Swifts ==
Order: Caprimulgiformes Family: Apodidae

Swifts are small birds which spend the majority of their lives flying. These birds have very short legs and never settle voluntarily on the ground, perching instead only on vertical surfaces. Many swifts have long swept-back wings which resemble a crescent or boomerang.

- Philippine spinetailed swift, Mearnsia picina
- Papuan spinetailed swift, Mearnsia novaeguineae
- White-rumped needletail, Zoonavena sylvatica
- Silver-rumped needletail, Rhaphidura leucopygialis
- Sabine's spinetail, Rhaphidura sabini
- White-throated needletail, Hirundapus caudacutus
- Silver-backed needletail, Hirundapus cochinchinensis
- Brown-backed needletail, Hirundapus giganteus
- Purple needletail, Hirundapus celebensis
- Waterfall swift, Hydrochous gigas
- Pygmy swiftlet, Collocalia troglodytes
- Bornean swiftlet, Collocalia dodgei
- Cave swiftlet, Collocalia linchi
- Plume-toed swiftlet, Collocalia affinis
- Gray-rumped swiftlet, Collocalia marginata
- Ridgetop swiftlet, Collocalia isonota
- Tenggara swiftlet, Collocalia sumbawae
- Drab swiftlet, Collocalia neglecta
- Glossy swiftlet, Collocalia esculenta
- Satin swiftlet, Collocalia uropygialis
- Christmas Island swiftlet, Collocalia natalis
- Indian swiftlet, Aerodramus unicolor
- Sulawesi swiftlet, Aerodramus sororum
- Halmahera swiftlet, Aerodramus infuscatus
- Seram swiftlet, Aerodramus ceramensis
- Philippine swiftlet, Aerodramus mearnsi
- Mountain swiftlet, Aerodramus hirundinaceus
- Himalayan swiftlet, Aerodramus brevirostris
- Volcano swiftlet, Aerodramus vulcanorum
- Whitehead's swiftlet, Aerodramus whiteheadi
- Bare-legged swiftlet, Aerodramus nuditarsus
- Ameline swiftlet, Aerodramus amelis
- Palawan swiftlet, Aerodramus palawanensis
- Uniform swiftlet, Aerodramus vanikorensis
- Mossy-nest swiftlet, Aerodramus salangana
- Black-nest swiftlet, Aerodramus maximus
- White-nest swiftlet, Aerodramus fuciphagus
- German's swiftlet, Aerodramus germani
- Three-toed swiftlet, Aerodramus papuensis
- White-rumped swiftlet, Aerodramus spodiopygius
- Australian swiftlet, Aerodramus terraereginae
- Mayr's swiftlet, Aerodramus orientalis
- Alpine swift, Apus melba
- Common swift, Apus apus
- Pallid swift, Apus pallidus
- Pacific swift, Apus pacificus
- Salim Ali's swift, Apus salimalii
- Blyth's swift, Apus leuconyx
- Cook's swift, Apus cooki
- Dark-rumped swift, Apus acuticauda
- Little swift, Apus affinis
- House swift, Apus nipalensis
- White-rumped swift, Apus caffer
- Plain swift, Apus unicolor
- Forbes-Watson's swift, Apus berliozi
- Asian palm-swift, Cypsiurus balasiensis
- African palm-swift, Cypsiurus parvus

== Treeswifts ==
Order: Caprimulgiformes Family: Hemiprocnidae

The treeswifts, also called crested swifts, are closely related to the true swifts. They differ from the other swifts in that they have crests, long forked tails and softer plumage.

- Crested treeswift, Hemiprocne coronata
- Gray-rumped treeswift, Hemiprocne longipennis
- Whiskered treeswift, Hemiprocne comata
- Moustached treeswift, Hemiprocne mystacea

== Rails, gallinules, and coots ==
Order: Gruiformes Family: Rallidae

Rallidae is a large family of small to medium-sized birds which includes the rails, crakes, coots and gallinules. Typically they inhabit dense vegetation in damp environments near lakes, swamps or rivers. In general they are shy and secretive birds, making them difficult to observe. Most species have strong legs and long toes which are well adapted to soft uneven surfaces. They tend to have short, rounded wings and to be weak fliers.

- Water rail, Rallus aquaticus
- Brown-cheeked rail, Rallus indicus
- Corn crake, Crex crex
- Snoring rail, Aramidopsis plateni
- Slaty-breasted rail, Lewinia striata
- Luzon rail, Lewinia mirifica
- Lewin's rail, Lewinia pectoralis
- Blue-faced rail, Gymnocrex rosenbergii
- Bare-eyed rail, Gymnocrex plumbeiventris
- Talaud rail, Gymnocrex talaudensis
- Calayan rail, Gallirallus calayanensis
- Invisible rail, Gallirallus wallacii
- Chestnut rail, Gallirallus castaneoventris
- Okinawa rail, Gallirallus okinawae
- Buff-banded rail, Gallirallus philippensis
- Barred rail, Gallirallus torquatus
- New Britain rail, Gallirallus insignis
- Woodford's rail, Gallirallus woodfordi
- Weka, Gallirallus australis
- Lord Howe woodhen, Gallirallus sylvestris
- Bar-winged rail, Gallirallus poecilopterus
- Sora, Porzana carolina
- Spotted crake, Porzana porzana
- Eurasian moorhen, Gallinula chloropus
- Dusky moorhen, Gallinula tenebrosa
- Eurasian coot, Fulica atra
- Red-knobbed coot, Fulica cristata
- American coot, Fulica americana
- Allen's gallinule, Porphyrio alleni
- Black-backed swamphen, Porphyrio indicus
- Australasian swamphen, Porphyrio melanotus
- Philippine swamphen, Porphyrio pulverulentus
- Gray-headed swamphen, Porphyrio poliocephalus
- African swamphen, Porphyrio madagascariensis
- Purple gallinule, Porphyrio martinica
- New Guinea flightless rail, Megacrex inepta
- Watercock, Gallicrex cinerea
- Isabelline bush-hen, Amaurornis isabellina
- Plain bush-hen, Amaurornis olivacea (E)
- White-breasted waterhen, Amaurornis phoenicurus
- Talaud bush-hen, Amaurornis magnirostris
- Pale-vented bush-hen, Amaurornis moluccana
- Striped crake, Amaurornis marginalis
- White-browed crake, Poliolimnas cinereus
- Chestnut forest-rail, Rallina rubra
- White-striped forest-rail, Rallina leucospila
- Forbes's rail, Rallina forbesi
- Mayr's rail, Rallina mayri
- Red-necked crake, Rallina tricolor
- Andaman crake, Rallina canningi
- Red-legged crake, Rallina fasciata
- Slaty-legged crake, Rallina eurizonoides
- Ruddy-breasted crake, Zapornia fusca
- Band-bellied crake, Zapornia paykullii
- Brown crake, Zapornia akool
- Little crake, Zapornia parva
- Baillon's crake, Zapornia pusilla
- Black-tailed crake, Zapornia bicolor
- Spotless crake, Zapornia tabuensis
- Swinhoe's rail, Zapornia exquisitus
- Black crake, Zaporina flavirostra
- Black-tailed nativehen, Tribonyx ventralis
- Tasmanian nativehen, Tribonyx mortierii
- Lesser moorhen, Paragallinula angulata
- Swinhoe's rail, Coturnicops exquisitus
- Striped crake, Aenigmatolimnas marginalis
- Giant wood-rail, Aramides ypecaha

== Finfoots ==
Order: Gruiformes Family: Heliornithidae

Heliornithidae is small family of tropical birds with webbed lobes on their feet similar to those of grebes and coots.

- Masked finfoot, Heliopais personatus

== Cranes ==
Order: Gruiformes Family: Gruidae

Cranes are large, long-legged, and long-necked birds. Unlike the similar-looking but unrelated herons, cranes fly with necks outstretched, not pulled back. Most have elaborate and noisy courting displays or "dances".

- Demoiselle crane, Anthropoides virgo
- Siberian crane, Leucogeranus leucogeranus
- Sandhill crane, Antigone canadensis
- Sarus crane, Antigone antigone
- Brolga, Antigone rubicunda
- White-naped crane, Antigone vipio
- Common crane, Grus grus
- Hooded crane, Grus monacha
- Black-necked crane, Grus nigricollis
- Red-crowned crane, Grus japonensis
- Black crowned-crane, Balearica pavonina

== Sheathbills ==
- Black-faced sheathbill, Chionis minor
- Snowy sheathbill, Chionis albus

== Thick-knees ==
Order: Charadriiformes Family: Burhinidae

The thick-knees are found worldwide within the tropical zone, with some species also breeding in temperate Europe and Australia. They are medium to large waders with strong black or yellow-black bills, large yellow eyes, and cryptic plumage. Despite being classed as waders, most species have a preference for arid or semi-arid habitats.

- Eurasian thick-knee, Burhinus oedicnemus
- Indian thick-knee, Burhinus indicus
- Spotted thick-knee, Burhinus capensis
- Bush thick-knee, Burhinus grallarius
- Senegal thick-knee, Burhinus senegalensis
- Peruvian thick-knee, Burhinus superciliaris
- Great thick-knee, Esacus recurvirostris
- Beach thick-knee, Esacus magnirostris

== Egyptian plover ==
Order: Charadriiformes Family: Pluvianidae

The Egyptian plover is found across equatorial Africa and along the Nile River.

- Egyptian plover, Pluvianus aegyptius

== Stilts and avocets ==
Order: Charadriiformes Family: Recurvirostridae

Recurvirostridae is a family of large wading birds, which includes the avocets and stilts. The avocets have long legs and long up-curved bills. The stilts have extremely long legs and long, thin, straight bills.

- Black-winged stilt, Himantopus himantopus
- Pied stilt, Himantopus leucocephalus
- Black-necked stilt, Himantopus mexicanus
- Pied avocet, Recurvirostra avosetta
- Red-necked avocet, Recurvirostra novaehollandiae (A)
- American avocet, Recurvirostra americana
- Banded stilt, Cladorhynchus leucocephalus

== Ibisbill ==
Order: Charadriiformes Family: Ibidorhynchidae

The ibisbill is related to the waders, but is sufficiently distinctive to be a family unto itself. The adult is gray with a white belly, red legs, a long down curved bill, and a black face and breast band.

- Ibisbill, Ibidorhyncha struthersii

== Oystercatchers ==
Order: Charadriiformes Family: Haematopodidae

The oystercatchers are large and noisy plover-like birds, with strong bills used for smashing or prising open molluscs.

- Eurasian oystercatcher, Haematopus ostralegus
- Pied oystercatcher, Haematopus longirostris
- Sooty oystercatcher, Haematopus fuliginosus (A)
- Black oystercatcher, Haematopus bachmani
- South Island oystercatcher, Haematopus finschi
- Canarian oystercatcher, Haematopus meadewaldoi

== Plovers and lapwings ==
Order: Charadriiformes Family: Charadriidae

The family Charadriidae includes the plovers, dotterels and lapwings. They are small to medium-sized birds with compact bodies, short, thick necks and long, usually pointed, wings. They are found in open country worldwide, mostly in habitats near water.

- Black-bellied plover, Pluvialis squatarola
- European golden-plover, Pluvialis apricaria
- American golden-plover, Pluvialis dominica
- Pacific golden-plover, Pluvialis fulva
- Northern lapwing, Vanellus vanellus
- Blacksmith lapwing, Vanellus armatus (A)
- Spur-winged plover, Vanellus spinosus
- River lapwing, Vanellus duvaucelii
- Yellow-wattled lapwing, Vanellus malabaricus
- Black-headed lapwing, Vanellus tectus
- Gray-headed lapwing, Vanellus cinereus
- Red-wattled lapwing, Vanellus indicus
- Javan lapwing, Vanellus macropterus
- Masked lapwing, Vanellus miles
- Sociable lapwing, Vanellus gregarius
- White-tailed lapwing, Vanellus leucurus
- Banded lapwing, Vanellus tricolor
- Black-winged lapwing, Vanellus melanopterus
- Crowned lapwing, Vanellus coronatus
- Southern lapwing, Vanellus chilensis
- Lesser sand-plover, Charadrius mongolus
- Greater sand-plover, Charadrius leschenaultii
- Caspian plover, Charadrius asiaticus
- Kittlitz's plover, Charadrius pecuarius
- Red-capped plover, Charadrius ruficapillus
- Malaysian plover, Charadrius peronii
- Kentish plover, Charadrius alexandrinus
- White-faced plover, Charadrius dealbatus
- Snowy plover, Charadrius nivosus
- Javan plover, Charadrius javanicus
- Common ringed plover, Charadrius hiaticula
- Semipalmated plover, Charadrius semipalmatus
- Long-billed plover, Charadrius placidus
- Little ringed plover, Charadrius dubius
- Killdeer, Charadrius vociferus (A)
- Oriental plover, Charadrius veredus
- Eurasian dotterel, Charadrius morinellus
- Three-banded plover, Charadrius tricollaris
- Double-banded plover, Charadrius bicinctus
- White-fronted plover, Charadrius marginatus
- Red-kneed dotterel, Elseyornis cinctus
- Black-fronted dotterel, Elseyornis melanops
- Hooded plover, Thinornis cucullatus
- Inland dotterel, Peltohyas australis

== Plains-Wanderer ==
- Plains-wanderer, Pedionomus torquatus

== Painted-snipes ==
Order: Charadriiformes Family: Rostratulidae

Painted-snipes are short-legged, long-billed birds similar in shape to the true snipes, but more brightly colored.

- Greater painted-snipe, Rostratula benghalensis

== Jacanas ==
Order: Charadriiformes Family: Jacanidae

The jacanas are a group of tropical waders in the family Jacanidae. They are found throughout the tropics. They are identifiable by their huge feet and claws which enable them to walk on floating vegetation in the shallow lakes that are their preferred habitat.

- Comb-crested jacana, Irediparra gallinacea
- Pheasant-tailed jacana, Hydrophasianus chirurgus
- Bronze-winged jacana, Metopidius indicus

== Sandpipers and allies ==
Order: Charadriiformes Family: Scolopacidae

Scolopacidae is a large diverse family of small to medium-sized shorebirds including the sandpipers, curlews, godwits, shanks, tattlers, woodcocks, snipes, dowitchers and phalaropes. The majority of these species eat small invertebrates picked out of the mud or soil. Variation in length of legs and bills enables multiple species to feed in the same habitat, particularly on the coast, without direct competition for food.

- Upland sandpiper, Bartramia longicauda (A)
- Bristle-thighed curlew, Numenius tahitiensis
- Whimbrel, Numenius phaeopus
- Little curlew, Numenius minutus
- Eskimo curlew, Numenius borealis
- Far Eastern curlew, Numenius madagascariensis
- Slender-billed curlew, Numenius tenuirostris
- Eurasian curlew, Numenius arquata
- Bar-tailed godwit, Limosa lapponica
- Black-tailed godwit, Limosa limosa
- Hudsonian godwit, Limosa haemastica
- Ruddy turnstone, Arenaria interpres
- Black turnstone, Arenaria melanocephala
- Great knot, Calidris tenuirostris
- Red knot, Calidris canutus
- Ruff, Calidris pugnax
- Broad-billed sandpiper, Calidris falcinellus
- Sharp-tailed sandpiper, Calidris acuminata
- Stilt sandpiper, Calidris himantopus (A)
- Curlew sandpiper, Calidris ferruginea
- Temminck's stint, Calidris temminckii
- Long-toed stint, Calidris subminuta
- Spoon-billed sandpiper, Calidris pygmeus
- Red-necked stint, Calidris ruficollis
- Sanderling, Calidris alba
- Dunlin, Calidris alpina
- Rock sandpiper, Calidris ptilocnemis
- Purple sandpiper, Calidris maritima
- Baird's sandpiper, Calidris bairdii
- Little stint, Calidris minuta
- Least sandpiper, Calidris minutilla
- White-rumped sandpiper, Calidris fuscicollis (A)
- Buff-breasted sandpiper, Calidris subruficollis
- Pectoral sandpiper, Calidris melanotos
- Semipalmated sandpiper, Calidris pusilla
- Western sandpiper, Calidris mauri
- Asian dowitcher, Limnodromus semipalmatus (A)
- Short-billed dowitcher, Limnodromus griseus
- Long-billed dowitcher, Limnodromus scolopaceus
- Jack snipe, Lymnocryptes minimus
- Eurasian woodcock, Scolopax rusticola
- Amami woodcock, Scolopax mira
- Bukidnon woodcock, Scolopax bukidnonensis
- Javan woodcock, Scolopax saturata
- New Guinea woodcock, Scolopax rosenbergii
- Sulawesi woodcock, Scolopax celebensis
- Moluccan woodcock, Scolopax rochussenii
- American woodcock, Scolopax minor
- Solitary snipe, Gallinago solitaria
- Latham's snipe, Gallinago hardwickii
- Wood snipe, Gallinago nemoricola
- Great snipe, Gallinago media
- Common snipe, Gallinago gallinago
- Wilson's snipe, Gallinago delicata
- Pin-tailed snipe, Gallinago stenura
- Swinhoe's snipe, Gallinago megala
- Terek sandpiper, Xenus cinereus
- Wilson's phalarope, Phalaropus tricolor
- Red-necked phalarope, Phalaropus lobatus
- Red phalarope, Phalaropus fulicarius
- Common sandpiper, Actitis hypoleucos
- Spotted sandpiper, Actitis macularius
- Green sandpiper, Tringa ochropus
- Solitary sandpiper, Tringa solitaria (A)
- Gray-tailed tattler, Tringa brevipes
- Wandering tattler, Tringa incana
- Spotted redshank, Tringa erythropus
- Greater yellowlegs, Tringa melanoleuca
- Common greenshank, Tringa nebularia
- Nordmann's greenshank, Tringa guttifer
- Lesser yellowlegs, Tringa flavipes
- Marsh sandpiper, Tringa stagnatilis
- Wood sandpiper, Tringa glareola
- Common redshank, Tringa totanus
- Willet, Tringa semipalmata

== Buttonquail ==
Order: Charadriiformes Family: Turnicidae

The buttonquail are small, drab, running birds which resemble the true quails. The female is the brighter of the sexes and initiates courtship. The male incubates the eggs and tends the young.

- Small buttonquail, Turnix sylvaticus
- Red-backed buttonquail, Turnix maculosus
- Yellow-legged buttonquail, Turnix tanki
- Spotted buttonquail, Turnix ocellatus
- Barred buttonquail, Turnix suscitator
- Luzon buttonquail, Turnix worcesteri
- Sumba buttonquail, Turnix everetti
- Red-chested buttonquail, Turnix pyrrhothorax
- Black-breasted buttonquail, Turnix melanogaster
- Chestnut-backed buttonquail, Turnix castanotus
- Buff-breasted buttonquail, Turnix olivii
- Painted buttonquail, Turnix varius
- Little buttonquail, Turnix velox

== Crab plover ==
Order: Charadriiformes Family: Dromadidae

The crab-plover is related to the waders. It resembles a plover but with very long grey legs and a strong heavy black bill similar to a tern. It has black-and-white plumage, a long neck, partially webbed feet and a bill designed for eating crabs.

- Crab-plover, Dromas ardeola

== Pratincoles and coursers ==
Order: Charadriiformes Family: Glareolidae

Glareolidae is a family of wading birds comprising the pratincoles, which have short legs, long pointed wings and long forked tails, and the coursers, which have long legs, short wings and long, pointed bills which curve downwards.

- Cream-colored courser, Cursorius cursor
- Indian courser, Cursorius coromandelicus
- Temminck's courser, Cursorius temminckii
- Jerdon's courser, Rhinoptilus bitorquatus
- Australian pratincole, Stiltia isabella
- Collared pratincole, Glareola pratincola
- Oriental pratincole, Glareola maldivarum
- Black-winged pratincole, Glareola nordmanni
- Small pratincole, Glareola lactea
- Bronze-winged courser, Rhinoptilus chalcopterus

== Skuas and jaegers ==
Order: Charadriiformes Family: Stercorariidae

The family Stercorariidae are, in general, medium to large birds, typically with gray or brown plumage, often with white markings on the wings. They nest on the ground in temperate and arctic regions and are long-distance migrants.

- Great skua, Stercorarius skua
- South polar skua, Stercorarius maccormicki
- Brown skua, Stercorarius antarcticus
- Pomarine jaeger, Stercorarius pomarinus
- Parasitic jaeger, Stercorarius parasiticus
- Long-tailed jaeger, Stercorarius longicaudus

== Auks, murres and puffins ==
Order: Charadriiformes Family: Alcidae

Alcids are superficially similar to penguins due to their black-and-white colors, their upright posture and some of their habits, however they are not related to the penguins and differ in being able to fly. Auks live on the open sea, only deliberately coming ashore to nest.

- Dovekie, Alle alle
- Common murre, Uria aalge
- Thick-billed murre, Uria lomvia
- Razorbill, Alca torda
- Great auk, Pinguinus impennis (X)
- Black guillemot, Cepphus grylle
- Pigeon guillemot, Cepphus columba
- Spectacled guillemot, Cepphus carbo
- Long-billed murrelet, Brachyramphus perdix
- Kittlitz's murrelet, Brachyramphus brevirostris
- Ancient murrelet, Synthliboramphus antiquus
- Japanese murrelet, Synthliboramphus wumizusume
- Guadalupe murrelet, Synthliborhamphus hypoleucus
- Cassin's auklet, Ptychoramphus aleuticus
- Parakeet auklet, Aethia psittacula
- Least auklet, Aethia pusilla
- Whiskered auklet, Aethia pygmaea
- Crested auklet, Aethia cristatella
- Rhinoceros auklet, Cerorhinca monocerata
- Atlantic puffin, Fratercula arctica
- Horned puffin, Fratercula corniculata
- Tufted puffin, Fratercula cirrhata

== Gulls, terns, and skimmers ==
Order: Charadriiformes Family: Laridae

Laridae is a family of medium to large seabirds, the gulls, terns and skimmers. Gulls are typically gray or white, often with black markings on the head or wings. They have stout, longish bills and webbed feet. Terns are a group of generally medium to large seabirds typically with gray or white plumage, often with black markings on the head. Most terns hunt fish by diving but some pick insects off the surface of fresh water. Terns are generally long-lived birds, with several species known to live in excess of 30 years. Skimmers are a small family of tropical tern-like birds. They have an elongated lower mandible which they use to feed by flying low over the water surface and skimming the water for small fish.

- Black-legged kittiwake, Rissa tridactyla
- Red-legged kittiwake, Rissa brevirostris
- Ivory gull, Pagophila eburnea
- Sabine's gull, Xema sabini
- Saunders's gull, Saundersilarus saundersi
- Slender-billed gull, Chroicocephalus genei
- Bonaparte's gull, Chroicocephalus philadelphia
- Silver gull, Chroicocephalus novaehollandiae
- Gray-hooded gull, Chroicocephalus cirrocephalus
- Black-headed gull, Chroicocephalus ridibundus
- Brown-headed gull, Chroicocephalus brunnicephalus
- Little gull, Hydrocoloeus minutus
- Ross's gull, Rhodostethia rosea
- Laughing gull, Leucophaeus atricilla (A)
- Franklin's gull, Leucophaeus pipixcan
- Dolphin gull, Leucophaeus scoresbii
- Mediterranean gull, Ichthyaetus melanocephalus
- Relict gull, Ichthyaetus relictus
- White-eyed gull, Ichthyaetus leucophthalmus
- Sooty gull, Ichthyaetus hemprichii
- Pallas's gull, Ichthyaetus ichthyaetus
- Audouin's gull, Ichthyaetus audouinii
- Black-tailed gull, Larus crassirostris
- Common gull, Larus canus (A)
- Short-billed gull, Larus brachyrhynchus (A)
- Ring-billed gull, Larus delawarensis
- Western gull, Larus occidentalis (A)
- California gull, Larus californicus
- Herring gull, Larus argentatus
- Yellow-legged gull, Larus michahellis (A)
- Caspian gull, Larus cachinnans
- Armenian gull, Larus armenicus
- Iceland gull, Larus glaucoides
- Lesser black-backed gull, Larus fuscus
- Slaty-backed gull, Larus schistisagus
- Glaucous-winged gull, Larus glaucescens
- Glaucous gull, Larus hyperboreus
- Great black-backed gull, Larus marinus
- Kelp gull, Larus dominicanus
- Pacific gull, Larus pacificus
- Brown noddy, Anous stolidus
- Black noddy, Anous minutus
- Lesser noddy, Anous tenuirostris
- Grey noddy, Anous albivitta
- Blue-gray noddy, Procelsterna ceruleus
- White tern, Gygis alba
- Sooty tern, Onychoprion fuscatus
- Gray-backed tern, Onychoprion lunatus
- Bridled tern, Onychoprion anaethetus
- Aleutian tern, Onychoprion aleuticus
- Little tern, Sternula albifrons
- Least tern, Sternula antillarum
- Saunders's tern, Sternula saundersi
- Australian fairy tern, Sternula nereis
- Gull-billed tern, Gelochelidon nilotica
- Caspian tern, Hydroprogne caspia
- Black tern, Chlidonias niger
- White-winged tern, Chlidonias leucopterus
- Whiskered tern, Chlidonias hybrida
- Roseate tern, Sterna dougallii
- Black-naped tern, Sterna sumatrana
- Common tern, Sterna hirundo
- Arctic tern, Sterna paradisaea
- Black-bellied tern, Sterna acuticauda
- River tern, Sterna aurantia
- White-cheeked tern, Sterna repressa
- White-fronted tern, Sterna striata
- Antarctic tern, Sterna vittata
- Forster's tern, Sterna forsteri
- Great crested tern, Thalasseus bergii
- Sandwich tern, Thalasseus sandvicensis
- Lesser crested tern, Thalasseus bengalensis
- Chinese crested tern, Thalasseus bernsteini
- Royal tern, Thalasseus maximus
- Elegant tern, Thalasseus elegans
- African skimmer, Rynchops flavirostris
- Indian skimmer, Rynchops albicollis
- Black skimmer, Rynchops niger
- Swallow-tailed gull, Creagrus furcatus

== Tropicbirds ==
Order: Phaethontiformes Family: Phaethontidae

Tropicbirds are slender white birds of tropical oceans, with exceptionally long central tail feathers. Their heads and long wings have black markings.

- White-tailed tropicbird, Phaethon lepturus
- Red-billed tropicbird, Phaethon aethereus
- Red-tailed tropicbird, Phaethon rubricauda

== Loons ==
Order: Gaviiformes Family: Gaviidae

Loons, known as divers in Europe, are a group of aquatic birds found in many parts of North America and northern Europe. They are the size of a large duck or small goose, which they somewhat resemble when swimming, but to which they are completely unrelated.

- Red-throated loon, Gavia stellata
- Arctic loon, Gavia arctica
- Pacific loon, Gavia pacifica
- Common loon, Gavia immer
- Yellow-billed loon, Gavia adamsii

== Albatrosses ==
Order: Procellariiformes Family: Diomedeidae

The albatrosses are among the largest of flying birds, and the great albatrosses from the genus Diomedea have the largest wingspans of any extant birds.

- Yellow-nosed albatross, Thalassarche chlororhynchos
- White-capped albatross, Thalassarche cauta
- Grey-headed albatross, Thalassarche chrysostoma
- Buller's albatross, Thalassarche bulleri
- Salvin's albatross, Thalassarche salvini
- Chatham albatross, Thalassarche eremita
- Campbell albatross, Thalassarche impavida
- Black-browed albatross, Thalassarche melanophris
- Wandering albatross, Diomedea exulans
- Royal albatross, Diomedea epomophora
- Laysan albatross, Phoebastria immutabilis
- Black-footed albatross, Phoebastria nigripes
- Short-tailed albatross, Phoebastria albatrus
- Sooty albatross, Phoebetria fusca
- Light-mantled albatross, Phoebetria palpebrata

== Southern storm-petrels ==
Order: Procellariiformes Family: Oceanitidae

The southern storm-petrels are relatives of the petrels and are the smallest seabirds. They feed on planktonic crustaceans and small fish picked from the surface, typically while hovering.

- Wilson's storm-petrel, Oceanites oceanicus
- White-faced storm-petrel, Pelagodroma marina
- White-bellied storm-petrel, Fregetta grallaria
- Black-bellied storm-petrel, Fregetta tropica
- New Zealand storm-petrel, Fregetta maoriana
- Grey-backed storm-petrel, Garrodia nereis
- Polynesian storm-petrel, Nesofregetta fuliginosa

== Northern storm-petrels ==
Order: Procellariiformes Family: Hydrobatidae

The northern storm-petrels are relatives of the petrels and are the smallest seabirds. They feed on planktonic crustaceans and small fish picked from the surface, typically while hovering. The flight is fluttering and sometimes bat-like.

- European storm-petrel, Hydrobates pelagicus
- Fork-tailed storm-petrel, Hydrobates furcatus
- Leach's storm-petrel, Hydrobates leucorhous
- Swinhoe's storm-petrel, Hydrobates monorhis
- Band-rumped storm-petrel, Hydrobates castro
- Matsudaira's storm-petrel, Hydrobates matsudairae
- Tristram's storm-petrel, Hydrobates tristrami
- Least storm-petrel, Hydrobates microsomus
- Monteiro's storm-petrel, Hydrobates monteroi
- Cape Verde storm-petrel, Hydrobates jabejabe

== Shearwaters and petrels ==
Order: Procellariiformes Family: Procellariidae

The procellariids are the main group of medium-sized "true petrels", characterized by united nostrils with medium septum and a long outer functional primary.

- Southern giant-petrel, Macronectes giganteus
- Northern giant-petrel, Macronectes halli
- Northern fulmar, Fulmarus glacialis
- Southern fulmar, Fulmarus glacialoides
- Cape petrel, Daption capense
- Kermadec petrel, Pterodroma neglecta
- Providence petrel, Pterodroma solandri
- Barau's petrel, Pterodroma baraui
- Mottled petrel, Pterodroma inexpectata
- Juan Fernandez petrel, Pterodroma externa
- Atlantic petrel, Pterodroma incerta
- Galapagos petrel, Pterodroma phaeopygia (A)
- Hawaiian petrel, Pterodroma sandwichensis
- White-necked petrel, Pterodroma cervicalis
- Bonin petrel, Pterodroma hypoleuca
- Black-winged petrel, Pterodroma nigripennis
- Gould's petrel, Pterodroma leucoptera
- Stejneger's petrel, Pterodroma longirostris
- Pycroft's petrel, Pterodroma pycrofti
- Herald petrel, Pterodroma heraldica
- Collared petrel, Pterodroma brevipes
- Great-winged petrel, Pterodroma macroptera
- Grey-faced petrel, Pterodroma gouldi
- Trindade petrel, Pterodroma arminjoniana
- Soft-plumaged petrel, Pterodroma mollis
- White-headed petrel, Pterodroma lessonii
- Cook's petrel, Pterodroma cookii
- Vanuatu petrel, Pterodroma occulta
- Murphy's petrel, Pterodroma ultima
- Fea's petrel, Pterodroma feae
- Zino's petrel, Pterodroma madeira
- Bermuda petrel, Pterodroma cahow
- Black-capped petrel, Pterodroma hasitata
- Phoenix petrel, Pterodroma alba
- Antarctic prion, Pachyptila desolata
- Slender-billed prion, Pachyptila belcheri
- Broad-billed prion, Pachyptila vittata
- Fairy prion, Pachyptila turtur
- Salvin's prion, Pachyptila salvini
- Fulmar prion, Pachyptila crassirostris
- Bulwer's petrel, Bulweria bulwerii
- Jouanin's petrel, Bulweria fallax
- Mascarene petrel, Pseudobulweria aterrima
- Tahiti petrel, Pseudobulweria rostrata
- Beck's petrel, Pseudobulweria becki (A)
- Fiji petrel, Pseudobulweria macgillivrayi
- Streaked shearwater, Calonectris leucomelas
- Cory's shearwater, Calonectris diomedea
- Cape Verde shearwater, Calonectris edwardsii
- Pink-footed shearwater, Ardenna creatopus (A)
- Flesh-footed shearwater, Ardenna carneipes
- Great shearwater, Ardenna gravis
- Wedge-tailed shearwater, Ardenna pacificus
- Buller's shearwater, Ardenna bulleri
- Sooty shearwater, Ardenna griseus
- Short-tailed shearwater, Ardenna tenuirostris
- Christmas shearwater, Puffinus nativitatis
- Manx shearwater, Puffinus puffinus
- Yelkouan shearwater, Puffinus yelkouan
- Balearic shearwater, Puffinus mauretanicus (A)
- Bannerman's shearwater, Puffinus bannermani
- Newell's shearwater, Puffinus newelli (A)
- Bryan's shearwater, Puffinus bryani
- Tropical shearwater, Puffinus bailloni
- Persian shearwater, Puffinus persicus
- Heinroth's shearwater, Puffinus heinrothi
- Hutton's shearwater, Puffinus huttoni
- Fluttering shearwater, Puffinus gavia
- Little shearwater, Puffinus assimilis
- Subantarctic shearwater, Puffinus elegans
- Barolo shearwater, Puffinus baroli
- Boyd's shearwater, Puffinus boydi
- Antarctic petrel, Thalasssoica antarctica
- Snow petrel, Pagodroma nivea
- Kerguelen petrel, Aphrodroma brevirostris
- Blue petrel, Halobaena caerulea
- Grey petrel, Procellaria cinerea
- White-chinned petrel, Procellaria aequinoctailis
- Parkinson's petrel, Procellaria parkinsoni
- Westland petrel, Procellaria westlandica
- Common diving-petrel, Pelecanoides urinatrix
- South Georgian diving-petrel, Pelecanoides georgicus

== Storks ==
Order: Ciconiiformes Family: Ciconiidae

Storks are large, long-legged, long-necked, wading birds with long, stout bills. Storks are mute, but bill-clattering is an important mode of communication at the nest. Their nests can be large and may be reused for many years. Many species are migratory.

- Asian openbill, Anastomus oscitans
- African openbill, Anastomus lamelligerus
- Black stork, Ciconia nigra
- Abdim's stork, Ciconia abdimii
- Asian woolly-necked stork, Ciconia episcopus
- Storm's stork, Ciconia stormi
- White stork, Ciconia ciconia
- Oriental stork, Ciconia boyciana
- Black-necked stork, Ephippiorhynchus asiaticus
- Lesser adjutant, Leptoptilos javanicus
- Marabou stork, Leptoptilos crumenifer (A)
- Greater adjutant, Leptoptilos dubius
- Milky stork, Mycteria cinerea
- Yellow-billed stork, Mycteria ibis
- Painted stork, Mycteria leucocephala
- Saddle-billed stork, Ephippiorhynchus senegalensis

== Frigatebirds ==
Order: Suliformes Family: Fregatidae

Frigatebirds are large seabirds usually found over tropical oceans. They are large, black-and-white or completely black, with long wings and deeply forked tails. The males have colored inflatable throat pouches. They do not swim or walk and cannot take off from a flat surface. Having the largest wingspan-to-body-weight ratio of any bird, they are essentially aerial, able to stay aloft for more than a week.

- Lesser frigatebird, Fregata ariel
- Christmas Island frigatebird, Fregata andrewsi
- Great frigatebird, Fregata minor

== Boobies and gannets ==
Order: Suliformes Family: Sulidae

The sulids comprise the gannets and boobies. Both groups are medium to large coastal seabirds that plunge-dive for fish.

- Masked booby, Sula dactylatra
- Nazca booby, Sula granti (A)
- Brown booby, Sula leucogaster
- Red-footed booby, Sula sula
- Abbott's booby, Papasula abbotti
- Northern gannet, Morus bassanus

== Anhingas ==
Order: Suliformes Family: Anhingidae

Anhingas or darters are cormorant-like water birds with long necks and long, straight bills. They are fish eaters which often swim with only their neck above the water.

- Oriental darter, Anhinga melanogaster
- Australasian darter, Anhinga novaehollandiae
- African darter, Anhinga rufa

== Cormorants and shags ==
Order: Suliformes Family: Phalacrocoracidae

Cormorants are medium-to-large aquatic birds, usually with mainly dark plumage and areas of coloured skin on the face. The bill is long, thin and sharply hooked. Their feet are four-toed and webbed, a distinguishing feature among the order Pelecaniformes.

- Little pied cormorant, Microcarbo melanoleucos
- Little cormorant, Microcarbo niger
- Pygmy cormorant, Microcarbo pygmeus
- Long-tailed cormorant, Microcarbo africanus
- Red-faced cormorant, Urile urile
- Pelagic cormorant, Urile pelagicus
- Pallas's cormorant, Urile perspicillatus (X)
- Great cormorant, Phalacrocorax carbo
- Japanese cormorant, Phalacrocorax capillatus
- Socotra cormorant, Phalacrocorax nigrogularis
- Indian cormorant, Phalacrocorax fuscicollis
- Little black cormorant, Phalacrocorax sulcirostris
- Pied cormorant, Phalacrocorax varius
- Spotted shag, Phalacrocorax punctatus
- Black-faced cormorant, Phalacrocorax fuscescens
- European shag, Gulosus aristotelis
- Kerguelen shag, Leucocarbo verrucosus
- Macquarie shag, Leucocarbo purpurascens
- Imperial shag, Leucocarbo atriceps

== Pelicans ==
Order: Pelecaniformes Family: Pelecanidae

Pelicans are large water birds with distinctive pouches under their bills. Like other birds in the order Pelecaniformes, they have four webbed toes.

- Great white pelican, Pelecanus onocrotalus
- Australian pelican, Pelecanus conspicillatus
- Pink-backed pelican, Pelecanus rufescens
- Spot-billed pelican, Pelecanus philippensis
- Dalmatian pelican, Pelecanus crispus

== Hamerkop ==
Order: Pelecaniformes Family: Scopidae

The hamerkop is a medium-sized bird with a long shaggy crest. The shape of its head with a curved bill and crest at the back is reminiscent of a hammer, hence its name. Its plumage is drab-brown all over.

- Hamerkop, Scopus umbretta

== Herons, egrets, and bitterns ==
Order: Pelecaniformes Family: Ardeidae

The family Ardeidae contains the bitterns, herons, and egrets. Herons and egrets are medium to large wading birds with long necks and legs. Bitterns tend to be shorter necked and more wary. Members of Ardeidae fly with their necks retracted, unlike other long-necked birds such as storks, ibises, and spoonbills.

- Great bittern, Botaurus stellaris
- Australasian bittern, Botaurus poiciloptilus
- American bittern, Botaurus lentiginosus
- Yellow bittern, Ixobrychus sinensis
- Little bittern, Ixobrychus minutus
- Black-backed bittern, Ixobrychus dubius
- Schrenck's bittern, Ixobrychus eurhythmus
- Cinnamon bittern, Ixobrychus cinnamomeus
- Black bittern, Ixobrychus flavicollis
- Dwarf bittern, Ixobrychus sturmii
- Least bittern, Ixobrychus exilis
- Forest bittern, Zonerodius heliosylus
- Gray heron, Ardea cinerea
- Pacific heron, Ardea pacifica
- Black-headed heron, Ardea melanocephala
- White-bellied heron, Ardea insignis
- Great-billed heron, Ardea sumatrana
- Goliath heron, Ardea goliath
- Purple heron, Ardea purpurea
- Great egret, Ardea alba
- Intermediate egret, Ardea intermedia
- White-faced heron, Egretta novaehollandiae
- Chinese egret, Egretta eulophotes
- Little egret, Egretta garzetta
- Western reef-heron, Egretta gularis
- Pacific reef-heron, Egretta sacra
- Pied heron, Egretta picata
- Black heron, Egretta ardesiaca
- Little blue heron, Egretta caerulea
- Tricolored heron, Egretta tricolor
- Cattle egret, Bubulcus ibis
- Squacco heron, Ardeola ralloides
- Indian pond-heron, Ardeola grayii
- Chinese pond-heron, Ardeola bacchus
- Javan pond-heron, Ardeola speciosa
- Malagasy pond-heron, Ardeola idae
- Striated heron, Butorides striata
- Green heron, Butorides virescens
- Black-crowned night-heron, Nycticorax nycticorax
- Nankeen night-heron, Nycticorax caledonicus
- White-eared night-heron, Gorsachius magnificus
- Japanese night-heron, Gorsachius goisagi
- Malayan night-heron, Gorsachius melanolophus
- White-backed night-heron, Gorsachius leuconotus
- Yellow-crowned night-heron, Nyctanassa violacea

== Ibises and spoonbills ==
Order: Pelecaniformes Family: Threskiornithidae

Threskiornithidae is a family of large terrestrial and wading birds which includes the ibises and spoonbills. They have long, broad wings with 11 primary and about 20 secondary feathers. They are strong fliers and despite their size and weight, very capable soarers.

- Glossy ibis, Plegadis falcinellus
- Puna ibis, Plegadis ridgwayi
- African sacred ibis, Threskiornis aethiopicus
- Black-headed ibis, Threskiornis melanocephalus
- Australian ibis, Threskiornis molucca
- Straw-necked ibis, Threskiornis spinicollis
- Red-naped ibis, Pseudibis papillosa
- White-shouldered ibis, Pseudibis davisoni
- Giant ibis, Pseudibis gigantea
- Northern bald ibis, Geronticus eremita
- Crested ibis, Nipponia nippon
- Eurasian spoonbill, Platalea leucorodia
- Royal spoonbill, Platalea regia
- African spoonbill, Platalea alba
- Black-faced spoonbill, Platalea minor
- Yellow-billed spoonbill, Platalea flavipes (A)
- Wattled ibis, Bostrychia carunculata
- Buff-necked ibis, Theristicus caudatus

== Osprey ==
Order: Accipitriformes Family: Pandionidae

The family Pandionidae contains only one species, the osprey. The osprey is a medium-large raptor which is a specialist fish-eater with a worldwide distribution.

- Osprey, Pandion haliaetus

== Hawks, eagles, and kites ==
Order: Accipitriformes Family: Accipitridae

Accipitridae is a family of birds of prey, which includes hawks, eagles, kites, harriers and Old World vultures. These birds have powerful hooked beaks for tearing flesh from their prey, strong legs, powerful talons and keen eyesight.

- Black-winged kite, Elanus caeruleus
- Black-shouldered kite, Elanus axillaris
- Letter-winged kite, Elanus scriptus
- Scissor-tailed kite, Chelictinia riocourii
- Bearded vulture, Gypaetus barbatus
- Egyptian vulture, Neophron percnopterus
- European honey-buzzard, Pernis apivorus
- Sulawesi honey-buzzard, Pernis celebensis
- Philippine honey-buzzard, Pernis steerei
- Oriental honey-buzzard, Pernis ptilorhynchus
- Long-tailed honey-buzzard, Henicopernis longicauda
- Black honey-buzzard, Henicopernis infuscatus
- Jerdon's baza, Aviceda jerdoni
- Pacific baza, Aviceda subcristata
- Black baza, Aviceda leuphotes
- Red-headed vulture, Sarcogyps calvus
- Cinereous vulture, Aegypius monachus
- Lappet-faced vulture, Torgos tracheliotos
- White-rumped vulture, Gyps bengalensis
- Indian vulture, Gyps indicus
- Slender-billed vulture, Gyps tenuirostris
- Rüppell's griffon, Gyps rueppelli
- Himalayan griffon, Gyps himalayensis
- Eurasian griffon, Gyps fulvus
- White-backed vulture, Gyps africanus
- Nicobar serpent-eagle, Spilornis klossi
- Sulawesi serpent-eagle, Spilornis rufipectus
- Mountain serpent-eagle, Spilornis kinabaluensis
- Crested serpent-eagle, Spilornis cheela
- Philippine serpent-eagle, Spilornis holospilus
- Andaman serpent-eagle, Spilornis elgini
- Philippine eagle, Pithecophaga jefferyi
- Bateleur, Terathopius ecaudatus
- Short-toed snake-eagle, Circaetus gallicus
- Beaudouin's snake-eagle, Circaetus beaudouini
- Bat hawk, Macheiramphus alcinus
- New Guinea eagle, Harpyopsis novaeguineae
- Changeable hawk-eagle, Nisaetus cirrhatus
- Flores hawk-eagle, Nisaetus floris
- Mountain hawk-eagle, Nisaetus nipalensis
- Legge's hawk-eagle, Nisaetus kelaarti
- Blyth's hawk-eagle, Nisaetus alboniger
- Javan hawk-eagle, Nisaetus bartelsi
- Sulawesi hawk-eagle, Nisaetus lanceolatus
- Philippine hawk-eagle, Nisaetus philippensis
- Pinsker's hawk-eagle, Nisaetus philippensis
- Wallace's hawk-eagle, Nisaetus nanus
- Rufous-bellied eagle, Lophotriorchis kienerii
- Black eagle, Ictinaetus malaiensis
- Lesser spotted eagle, Clanga pomarina
- Indian spotted eagle, Clanga hastata
- Greater spotted eagle, Clanga clanga
- Booted eagle, Hieraaetus pennatus
- Pygmy eagle, Hieraaetus weiskei
- Little eagle, Hieraaetus morphnoides
- Wahlberg's eagle, Hieraaetus wahlbergi
- Tawny eagle, Aquila rapax
- Steppe eagle, Aquila nipalensis
- Imperial eagle, Aquila heliaca
- Gurney's eagle, Aquila gurneyi
- Golden eagle, Aquila chrysaetos
- Wedge-tailed eagle, Aquila audax (A)
- Verreaux's eagle, Aquila verreauxii
- Bonelli's eagle, Aquila fasciata
- Gabar goshawk, Micronisus gabar
- White-eyed buzzard, Butastur teesa
- Rufous-winged buzzard, Butastur liventer
- Gray-faced buzzard, Butastur indicus
- Eurasian marsh-harrier, Circus aeruginosus
- Eastern marsh-harrier, Circus spilonotus
- Papuan marsh-harrier, Circus spilothorax
- Spotted harrier, Circus assimilis
- Hen harrier, Circus cyaneus
- Northern harrier, Circus hudsonius (A)
- Pallid harrier, Circus macrourus
- Pied harrier, Circus melanoleucos
- Montagu's harrier, Circus pygargus
- Swamp harrier, Circus approximans
- Malagasy harrier, Circus macrosceles
- Crested goshawk, Accipiter trivirgatus
- Sulawesi goshawk, Accipiter griseiceps
- Shikra, Accipiter badius
- Nicobar sparrowhawk, Accipiter butleri
- Levant sparrowhawk, Accipiter brevipes
- Chinese sparrowhawk, Accipiter soloensis
- Spot-tailed goshawk, Accipiter trinotatus
- Variable goshawk, Accipiter hiogaster
- Brown goshawk, Accipiter fasciatus
- Black-mantled goshawk, Accipiter melanochlamys
- Moluccan goshawk, Accipiter henicogrammus
- Gray-headed goshawk, Accipiter poliocephalus
- Japanese sparrowhawk, Accipiter gularis
- Small sparrowhawk, Accipiter nanus
- Besra, Accipiter virgatus
- Rufous-necked sparrowhawk, Accipiter erythrauchen
- Collared sparrowhawk, Accipiter cirrocephalus
- Vinous-breasted sparrowhawk, Accipiter rhodogaster
- Eurasian sparrowhawk, Accipiter nisus
- Northern goshawk, Accipiter gentilis
- Meyer's goshawk, Accipiter meyerianus
- Gray goshawk, Accipiter novaehollandiae
- Black goshawk, Accipiter melanoleucus
- Pied goshawk, Accipiter albogularis
- Slaty-mantled goshawk, Accipiter luteoschistaceus
- Imitator sparrowhawk, Accipiter imitator
- New Britain sparrowhawk, Accipiter brachyurus
- Fiji goshawk, Accipiter rufitorques
- Chestnut-shouldered goshawk, Erythrotriorchis buergersi
- Doria's goshawk, Megatriorchis doriae
- Red kite, Milvus milvus
- Black kite, Milvus migrans
- Whistling kite, Haliastur sphenurus
- Brahminy kite, Haliastur indus
- Bald eagle, Haliaeetus leucocephalus (A)
- White-tailed eagle, Haliaeetus albicilla
- Pallas's fish-eagle, Haliaeetus leucoryphus
- Steller's sea-eagle, Haliaeetus pelagicus
- White-bellied sea-eagle, Haliaeetus leucogaster
- Lesser fish-eagle, Haliaeetus humilis
- Gray-headed fish-eagle, Haliaeetus ichthyaetus
- Sanford's sea-eagle, Haliaeetus sanfordi
- Rough-legged hawk, Buteo lagopus
- Common buzzard, Buteo buteo
- Himalayan buzzard, Buteo refectus
- Eastern buzzard, Buteo japonicus
- Long-legged buzzard, Buteo rufinus
- Upland buzzard, Buteo hemilasius
- Socotra buzzard, Buteo socotraensis
- Cape Verde buzzard, Buteo bannermani
- Black-breasted kite, Hemirostra melanosternon
- Square-tailed kite, Lophoictinia isura
- Red goshawk, Erythrotriorchis radiatus
- Hooded vulture, Necrocyrtes monachus
- Dark chanting-goshawk, Melierax metabates
- Eastern chanting-goshawk, Melierax poliopterus

== Barn-owls ==
Order: Strigiformes Family: Tytonidae

Barn owls are medium to large owls with large heads and characteristic heart-shaped faces. They have long strong legs with powerful talons.

- Sooty owl, Tyto tenebricosa
- Australian masked-owl, Tyto novaehollandiae
- Seram masked-owl, Tyto almae (E)
- Lesser masked-owl, Tyto sororcula
- Taliabu masked-owl, Tyto nigrobrunnea
- Minahassa masked-owl, Tyto inexspectata
- Sulawesi masked-owl, Tyto rosenbergii
- Australasian grass-owl, Tyto longimembris
- Barn owl, Tyto alba (A)
- Andaman masked-owl, Tyto deroepstorffi
- Golden masked-owl, Tyto aurantia
- Manus masked-owl, Tyto manusi
- Oriental bay-owl, Phodilus badius
- Sri Lanka bay-owl, Phodilus assimilis

== Owls ==
Order: Strigiformes Family: Strigidae

The typical owls are small to large solitary nocturnal birds of prey. They have large forward-facing eyes and ears, a hawk-like beak and a conspicuous circle of feathers around each eye called a facial disk.

- White-fronted scops-owl, Otus sagittatus
- Andaman scops-owl, Otus balli
- Reddish scops-owl, Otus rufescens
- Serendib scops-owl, Otus thilohoffmanni
- Flores scops-owl, Otus alfredi
- Mountain scops-owl, Otus spilocephalus
- Rajah scops-owl, Otus brookii
- Javan scops-owl, Otus angelinae
- Mentawai scops-owl, Otus mentawi
- Indian scops-owl, Otus bakkamoena
- Collared scops-owl, Otus lettia
- Giant scops-owl, Otus gurneyi
- Sunda scops-owl, Otus lempiji
- Japanese scops-owl, Otus semitorques
- Wallace's scops-owl, Otus silvicola
- Palawan scops-owl, Otus fuliginosus
- Philippine scops-owl, Otus megalotis
- Everett's scops-owl, Otus everetti
- Negros scops-owl, Otus nigrorum
- Mindoro scops-owl, Otus mindorensis
- Moluccan scops-owl, Otus magicus
- Banggai scops-owl, Otus mendeni
- Wetar scops-owl, Otus tempestatis
- Rinjani scops-owl, Otus jolandae
- Mantanani scops-owl, Otus mantananensis
- Ryukyu scops-owl, Otus elegans
- Sulawesi scops-owl, Otus manadensis
- Sangihe scops-owl, Otus collari
- Siau scops-owl, Otus siaoensis
- Sula scops-owl, Otus sulaensis
- Biak scops-owl, Otus beccarii
- Simeulue scops-owl, Otus umbra
- Enggano scops-owl, Otus enganensis
- Nicobar scops-owl, Otus alius
- Eurasian scops-owl, Otus scops
- Cyprus scops-owl, Otus cyprius
- Pallid scops-owl, Otus brucei
- Mindanao scops-owl, Otus mirus
- Luzon scops-owl, Otus longicornis
- Arabian scops-owl, Otus pamelae
- Oriental scops-owl, Otus sunia
- Socotra scops-owl, Otus socotranus
- Eurasian eagle-owl, Bubo bubo
- Rock eagle-owl, Bubo bengalensis
- Pharaoh eagle-owl, Bubo ascalaphus
- Spot-bellied eagle-owl, Bubo nipalensis
- Barred eagle-owl, Bubo sumatranus
- Dusky eagle-owl, Bubo coromandus
- Philippine eagle-owl, Bubo philippensis
- Snowy owl, Bubo scandiacus
- Arabian eagle-owl, Bubo milesi
- Grayish eagle-owl, Bubo cinerascens
- Blakiston's fish-owl, Ketupa blakistoni
- Brown fish-owl, Ketupa zeylonensis
- Tawny fish-owl, Ketupa flavipes
- Buffy fish-owl, Ketupa ketupu
- Northern hawk owl, Surnia ulula
- Eurasian pygmy-owl, Glaucidium passerinum
- Asian barred owlet, Glaucidium cuculoides
- Javan owlet, Glaucidium castanopterum
- Jungle owlet, Glaucidium radiatum
- Chestnut-backed owlet, Glaucidium castanotum
- Collared owlet, Taenioptynx brodiei
- Sunda owlet, Taenioptynx sylvaticus
- Spotted owlet, Athene brama
- Little owl, Athene noctua
- Forest owlet, Athene blewitti
- Spotted wood-owl, Strix seloputo
- Mottled wood-owl, Strix ocellata
- Brown wood-owl, Strix leptogrammica
- Tawny owl, Strix aluco
- Himalayan owl, Strix nivicolum
- Desert owl, Strix hadorami
- Ural owl, Strix uralensis
- Great gray owl, Strix nebulosa
- Omani owl, Strix butleri
- Long-eared owl, Asio otus
- Short-eared owl, Asio flammeus
- Marsh owl, Asio capensis
- Boreal owl, Aegolius funereus
- Rufous owl, Ninox rufa
- Barking owl, Ninox connivens
- Sumba boobook, Ninox rudolfi
- Andaman boobook, Ninox affinis
- Alor boobook, Ninox plesseni
- Rote boobook, Ninox rotiensis
- Timor boobook, Ninox fusca
- Southern boobook, Ninox boobook
- Morepork, Ninox novaeseelandiae
- Least boobook, Ninox sumbaensis
- Brown boobook, Ninox scutulata
- Hume's boobook, Ninox obscura
- Northern boobook, Ninox japonica
- Chocolate boobook, Ninox randi
- Luzon boobook, Ninox philippensis
- Mindanao boobook, Ninox spilocephala
- Mindoro boobook, Ninox mindorensis
- Romblon boobook, Ninox spilonotus
- Cebu boobook, Ninox rumseyi
- Camiguin boobook, Ninox leventis
- Sulu boobook, Ninox reyi
- Ochre-bellied boobook, Ninox ochracea
- Togian boobook, Ninox burhani
- Cinnabar boobook, Ninox ios
- Halmahera boobook, Ninox hypogramma
- Tanimbar boobook, Ninox forbesi
- Seram boobook, Ninox squamipila
- Buru boobook, Ninox hantu
- Christmas Island boobook, Ninox natalis
- Papuan boobook, Ninox theomacha
- Speckled boobook, Ninox punctulata
- Manus boobook, Ninox meeki
- Bismarck boobook, Ninox variegata
- New Britain boobook, Ninox odiosa
- Solomons boobook, Ninox jacquinoti
- Powerful owl, Ninox strenua
- Christmas Island boobook, Ninox natalis
- Papuan owl, Uroglaux dimorpha
- Fearful owl, Nesasio solomonensis

== Trogons ==
Order: Trogoniformes Family: Trogonidae

The family Trogonidae includes trogons and quetzals. Found in tropical woodlands worldwide, they feed on insects and fruit, and their broad bills and weak legs reflect their diet and arboreal habits. Although their flight is fast, they are reluctant to fly any distance. Trogons have soft, often colorful, feathers with distinctive male and female plumage.

- Javan trogon, Harpactes reinwardtii
- Sumatran trogon, Harpactes mackloti
- Malabar trogon, Harpactes fasciatus
- Red-naped trogon, Harpactes kasumba
- Diard's trogon, Harpactes diardii
- Philippine trogon, Harpactes ardens
- Whitehead's trogon, Harpactes whiteheadi
- Cinnamon-rumped trogon, Harpactes orrhophaeus
- Scarlet-rumped trogon, Harpactes duvaucelii
- Red-headed trogon, Harpactes erythrocephalus
- Orange-breasted trogon, Harpactes oreskios
- Ward's trogon, Harpactes wardi

== Hoopoes ==
Order: Bucerotiformes Family: Upupidae

Hoopoes have black, white and orangey-pink coloring with a long crest on their head, the plumage of which sweeps backward at rest but can be flexed to an erect position.

- Eurasian hoopoe, Upupa epops

== Hornbills ==
Order: Bucerotiformes Family: Bucerotidae

Hornbills are a group of birds whose bill is shaped like a cow's horn, but without a twist, sometimes with a casque on the upper mandible. Frequently, the bill is brightly colored.

- African gray hornbill, Lophoceros nasutus
- White-crowned hornbill, Berenicornis comatus
- Helmeted hornbill, Buceros vigil
- Rufous hornbill, Buceros hydrocorax
- Rhinoceros hornbill, Buceros rhinoceros
- Great hornbill, Buceros bicornis
- Bushy-crested hornbill, Anorrhinus galeritus
- Brown hornbill, Anorrhinus austeni
- Rusty-cheeked hornbill, Anorrhinus tickelli
- Indian gray hornbill, Ocyceros birostris
- Malabar gray hornbill, Ocyceros griseus
- Sri Lanka gray hornbill, Ocyceros gingalensis
- Black hornbill, Anthracoceros malayanus
- Sulu hornbill, Anthracoceros montani
- Malabar pied-hornbill, Anthracoceros coronatus
- Oriental pied-hornbill, Anthracoceros albirostris
- Palawan hornbill, Anthracoceros marchei
- Rufous-necked hornbill, Aceros nipalensis
- Knobbed hornbill, Rhyticeros cassidix
- Sumba hornbill, Rhyticeros everetti
- Wreathed hornbill, Rhyticeros undulatus
- Plain-pouched hornbill, Rhyticeros subruficollis
- Narcondam hornbill, Rhyticeros narcondami
- Blyth's hornbill, Rhyticeros plicatus
- Sulawesi hornbill, Rhabdotorrhinus exarhatus
- Wrinkled hornbill, Rhabdotorrhinus corrugatus
- Writhe-billed hornbill, Rhabdotorrhinus waldeni
- Writhed hornbill, Rhabdotorrhinus leucocephalus
- Visayan hornbill, Penelopides panini
- Luzon hornbill, Penelopides manillae
- Mindoro hornbill, Penelopides mindorensis
- Samar hornbill, Penelopides samarensis
- Mindanao hornbill, Penelopides affinis

== Kingfishers ==
Order: Coraciiformes Family: Alcedinidae

Kingfishers are medium-sized birds with large heads, long, pointed bills, short legs and stubby tails.

- Blyth's kingfisher, Alcedo hercules
- Common kingfisher, Alcedo atthis
- Blue-eared kingfisher, Alcedo meninting
- Javan blue-banded kingfisher, Alcedo euryzona
- Malaysian blue-banded kingfisher, Alcedo peninsulae
- Small blue kingfisher, Alcedo coerulescens
- Azure kingfisher, Ceyx azureus
- Indigo-banded kingfisher, Ceyx cyanopectus
- Northern silvery-kingfisher, Ceyx flumenicola
- Southern silvery-kingfisher, Ceyx argentatus
- Little kingfisher, Ceyx pusillus
- Black-backed dwarf-kingfisher, Ceyx erithaca
- Rufous-backed dwarf-kingfisher, Ceyx rufidorsa
- Philippine dwarf-kingfisher, Ceyx melanurus
- Sulawesi dwarf-kingfisher, Ceyx fallax
- Sangihe dwarf-kingfisher, Ceyx sangirensis
- Dimorphic dwarf-kingfisher, Ceyx margarethae
- Sula dwarf-kingfisher, Ceyx wallacii
- Moluccan dwarf-kingfisher, Ceyx lepidus
- Buru dwarf-kingfisher, Ceyx cajeli
- Papuan dwarf-kingfisher, Ceyx solitarius
- Bismarck kingfisher, Ceyx websteri
- Manus dwarf-kingfisher, Ceyx dispar
- New Ireland dwarf-kingfisher, Ceyx mulcatus
- New Britain dwarf-kingfisher, Ceyx sacerdotis
- North Solomons dwarf-kingfisher, Ceyx meeki
- Malachite kingfisher, Corythornis cristatus
- Banded kingfisher, Lacedo pulchella
- Blue-winged kookaburra, Dacelo leachii
- Spangled kookaburra, Dacelo tyro
- Rufous-bellied kookaburra, Dacelo gaudichaud
- Shovel-billed kookaburra, Clytoceyx rex
- Sulawesi lilac kingfisher, Cittura cyanotis
- Sangihe lilac kingfisher, Cittura sanghirensis
- Brown-winged kingfisher, Pelargopsis amauroptera
- Stork-billed kingfisher, Pelargopsis capensis
- Great-billed kingfisher, Pelargopsis melanorhyncha
- Ruddy kingfisher, Halcyon coromanda
- White-throated kingfisher, Halcyon smyrnensis
- Brown-breasted kingfisher, Halcyon gularis
- Gray-headed kingfisher, Halcyon leucocephala
- Black-capped kingfisher, Halcyon pileata
- Javan kingfisher, Halcyon cyanoventris
- Blue-black kingfisher, Todiramphus nigrocyaneus
- Rufous-lored kingfisher, Todiramphus winchelli
- Blue-and-white kingfisher, Todiramphus diops
- Lazuli kingfisher, Todiramphus lazuli
- Forest kingfisher, Todiramphus macleayii
- Guam kingfisher, Todiramphus cinnamominus
- Torresian kingfisher, Todiramphus sordidus
- Sacred kingfisher, Todiramphus sanctus
- Collared kingfisher, Todiramphus chloris
- Beach kingfisher, Todiramphus saurophagus
- Sombre kingfisher, Todiramphus funebris
- Talaud kingfisher, Todiramphus enigma
- Cinnamon-banded kingfisher, Todiramphus australasia
- New Britain kingfisher, Todiramphus albonotatus
- Ultramarine kingfisher, Todiramphus leucopygius
- Pohnpei kingfisher, Todiramphus reichenbachii
- Colonist kingfisher, Todiramphus colonus
- Melanesian kingfisher, Todiramphus tristrami
- Red-backed kingfisher, Todiramphus pyrrhopygia
- Pacific kingfisher, Todiramphus sacer
- White-rumped kingfisher, Caridonax fulgidus
- Hook-billed kingfisher, Melidora macrorrhina
- Rufous-collared kingfisher, Actenoides concretus
- Spotted kingfisher, Actenoides lindsayi
- Blue-capped kingfisher, Actenoides hombroni
- Green-backed kingfisher, Actenoides monachus
- Scaly-breasted kingfisher, Actenoides princeps
- Moustached kingfisher, Actenoides bougainvillei
- Yellow-billed kingfisher, Syma torotoro
- Mountain kingfisher, Syma megarhyncha
- Little paradise-kingfisher, Tanysiptera hydrocharis
- Common paradise-kingfisher, Tanysiptera galatea
- Kofiau paradise-kingfisher, Tanysiptera ellioti
- Biak paradise-kingfisher, Tanysiptera riedelii
- Numfor paradise-kingfisher, Tanysiptera carolinae
- Red-breasted paradise-kingfisher, Tanysiptera nympha
- Brown-headed paradise-kingfisher, Tanysiptera danae
- Buff-breasted paradise-kingfisher, Tanysiptera sylvia
- Black-capped paradise-kingfisher, Tanysiptera nigriceps
- Crested kingfisher, Megaceryle lugubris
- Pied kingfisher, Ceryle rudis

== Bee-eaters ==
Order: Coraciiformes Family: Meropidae

The bee-eaters are a group of coraciiform birds in the family Meropidae. Most species are found in Africa but others occur in southern Europe, Madagascar, Australia and New Guinea. They are characterized by richly colored plumage, slender bodies and usually elongated central tail feathers. All are colorful and have long downturned bills and pointed wings, which give them a swallow-like appearance when seen from afar.

- Red-bearded bee-eater, Nyctyornis amictus
- Blue-bearded bee-eater, Nyctyornis athertoni
- Purple-bearded bee-eater, Meropogon forsteni
- White-throated bee-eater, Merops albicollis
- Asian green bee-eater, Merops orientalis
- Arabian green bee-eater, Merops cyanophrys
- Blue-throated bee-eater, Merops viridis
- Rufous-crowned bee-eater, Merops americanus
- Blue-cheeked bee-eater, Merops persicus
- Blue-tailed bee-eater, Merops philippinus
- Rainbow bee-eater, Merops ornatus
- European bee-eater, Merops apiaster
- Chestnut-headed bee-eater, Merops leschenaulti
- Somali bee-eater, Merops revoilii
- Madagascar bee-eater, Merops superciliosus (A)

== Rollers ==
Order: Coraciiformes Family: Coraciidae

Rollers resemble crows in size and build, but are more closely related to the kingfishers and bee-eaters. They share the colorful appearance of those groups with blues and browns predominating. The two inner front toes are connected, but the outer toe is not.

- European roller, Coracias garrulus
- Abyssinian roller, Coracias abyssinicus
- Lilac-breasted roller, Coracias caudatus
- Rufous-crowned roller, Coracias noevius
- Indian roller, Coracias benghalensis
- Indochinese roller, Coracias affinis
- Purple-winged roller, Coracias temminckii
- Broad-billed roller, Eurystomus glaucurus
- Dollarbird, Eurystomus orientalis
- Azure roller, Eurystomus azureus

== Asian barbets ==
Order: Piciformes Family: Megalaimidae

The Asian barbets are plump birds, with short necks and large heads. They get their name from the bristles which fringe their heavy bills. Most species are brightly colored.

- Sooty barbet, Caloramphus hayii
- Brown barbet, Caloramphus fuliginosus
- Malabar barbet, Psilopogon malabaricus
- Crimson-fronted barbet, Psilopogon rubricapillus
- Coppersmith barbet, Psilopogon haemacephala
- Blue-eared barbet, Psilopogon australis
- Little barbet, Psilopogon australis
- Bornean barbet, Psilopogon eximus
- Fire-tufted barbet, Psilopogon pyrolophus
- Great barbet, Psilopogon virens
- Red-vented barbet, Psilopogon lagrandieri
- Red-crowned barbet, Psilopogon rafflesii
- Red-throated barbet, Psilopogon mystacophanos
- Black-banded barbet, Psilopogon javensis
- Golden-naped barbet, Psilopogon pulcherrimus
- Yellow-crowned barbet, Psilopogon henricii
- Flame-fronted barbet, Psilopogon armillaris
- Green-eared barbet, Psilopogon faiostrictus
- Lineated barbet, Psilopogon lineatus
- Brown-headed barbet, Psilopogon zeylanicus
- White-cheeked barbet, Psilopogon viridis
- Yellow-fronted barbet, Psilopogon flavifrons
- Golden-throated barbet, Psilopogon franklinii
- Necklaced barbet, Psilopogon auricularis
- Mountain barbet, Psilopogon monticola
- Brown-throated barbet, Psilopogon corvinus
- Golden-whiskered barbet, Psilopogon chrysopogon
- Moustached barbet, Psilopogon incognitus
- Taiwan barbet, Psilopogon nuchalis
- Chinese barbet, Psilopogon faber
- Blue-throated barbet, Psilopogon asiaticus
- Indochinese barbet, Psilopogon annamensis
- Black-browed barbet, Psilopogon oorti
- Turquoise-throated barbet, Psilopogon chersonesus

== Honeyguides ==
Order: Piciformes Family: Indicatoridae

Honeyguides are among the few birds that feed on wax. They are named for the greater honeyguide which leads traditional honey-hunters to bees' nests and, after the hunters have harvested the honey, feeds on the remaining contents of the hive.

- Yellow-rumped honeyguide, Indicator xanthonotus
- Malaysian honeyguide, Indicator archipelagicus

== Woodpeckers ==
Order: Piciformes Family: Picidae

Woodpeckers are small to medium-sized birds with chisel-like beaks, short legs, stiff tails and long tongues used for capturing insects. Some species have feet with two toes pointing forward and two backward, while several species have only three toes. Many woodpeckers have the habit of tapping noisily on tree trunks with their beaks.

- Eurasian wryneck, Jynx torquilla
- Speckled piculet, Picumnus innominatus
- Rufous piculet, Sasia abnormis
- White-browed piculet, Sasia ochracea
- Gray-and-buff woodpecker, Hemicircus concretus
- Heart-spotted woodpecker, Hemicircus canente
- Eurasian three-toed woodpecker, Picoides tridactylus
- Sulawesi pygmy woodpecker, Yungipicus temminckii
- Philippine pygmy woodpecker, Yungipicus maculatus
- Sulu pygmy woodpecker, Yungipicus ramsayi
- Brown-capped pygmy woodpecker, Yungipicus nanus
- Sunda pygmy woodpecker, Yungipicus moluccensis
- Gray-capped pygmy woodpecker, Yungipicus canicapillus
- Japanese pygmy woodpecker, Yungipicus kizuki
- Yellow-crowned woodpecker, Leiopicus mahrattensis
- Middle spotted woodpecker, Dendrocoptes medius
- Brown-fronted woodpecker, Dendrocoptes auriceps
- Arabian woodpecker, Dendrocoptes dorae
- Rufous-bellied woodpecker, Dendrocopos hyperythrus
- Fulvous-breasted woodpecker, Dendrocopos macei
- Freckle-breasted woodpecker, Dendrocopos analis
- Stripe-breasted woodpecker, Dendrocopos atratus
- Okinawa woodpecker, Dendrocopos noguchii
- White-backed woodpecker, Dendrocopos leucotos
- Darjeeling woodpecker, Dendrocopos darjellensis
- Great spotted woodpecker, Dendrocopos major
- White-winged woodpecker, Dendrocopos leucopterus
- Himalayan woodpecker, Dendrocopos himalayensis
- Syrian woodpecker, Dendrocopos syriacus
- Sind woodpecker, Dendrocopos assimilis
- Lesser spotted woodpecker, Dryobates minor
- Crimson-breasted woodpecker, Dryobates cathpharius
- Maroon woodpecker, Blythipicus rubiginosus
- Bay woodpecker, Blythipicus pyrrhotis
- Orange-backed woodpecker, Reinwardtipicus validus
- Greater flameback, Chrysocolaptes guttacristatus
- Javan flameback, Chrysocolaptes strictus
- Luzon flameback, Chrysocolaptes haematribon
- Yellow-faced flameback, Chrysocolaptes xanthocephalus
- Buff-spotted flameback, Chrysocolaptes lucidus
- Red-headed flameback, Chrysocolaptes erythrocephalus
- Crimson-backed flameback, Chrysocolaptes stricklandi
- White-naped woodpecker, Chrysocolaptes festivus
- Rufous woodpecker, Micropternus brachyurus
- Buff-necked woodpecker, Meiglyptes tukki
- Buff-rumped woodpecker, Meiglyptes tristis
- Black-and-buff woodpecker, Meiglyptes jugularis
- Pale-headed woodpecker, Gecinulus grantia
- Bamboo woodpecker, Gecinulus viridis
- Olive-backed woodpecker, Dinopium rafflesii
- Himalayan flameback, Dinopium shorii
- Common flameback, Dinopium javanense
- Spot-throated flameback, Dinopium everetti
- Black-rumped flameback, Dinopium benghalense
- Red-backed flameback, Dinopium psarodes
- Lesser yellownape, Picus chlorolophus
- Crimson-winged woodpecker, Picus puniceus
- Streak-throated woodpecker, Picus xanthopygaeus
- Scaly-bellied woodpecker, Picus squamatus
- Red-collared woodpecker, Picus rabieri
- Streak-breasted woodpecker, Picus viridanus
- Laced woodpecker, Picus vittatus
- Japanese woodpecker, Picus awokera
- Gray-headed woodpecker, Picus canus
- Black-headed woodpecker, Picus erythropygius
- Eurasian green woodpecker, Picus viridis
- Levaillant's woodpecker, Picus vaillantii
- Banded woodpecker, Chrysophlegma mineaceum
- Greater yellownape, Chrysophlegma flavinucha
- Checker-throated woodpecker, Chrysophlegma mentale
- Ashy woodpecker, Mulleripicus fulvus
- Northern sooty-woodpecker, Mulleripicus funebris
- Southern sooty-woodpecker, Mulleripicus fuliginosus
- Great slaty woodpecker, Mulleripicus pulverulentus
- Amami woodpecker, Dendrocopos owstoni
- White-bellied woodpecker, Dryocopus javensis
- Andaman woodpecker, Dryocopus hodgei
- Black woodpecker, Dryocopus martius

== Falcons and caracaras ==
Order: Falconiformes Family: Falconidae

Falconidae is a family of diurnal birds of prey. They differ from hawks, eagles and kites in that they kill with their beaks instead of their talons.

- White-rumped falcon, Polihierax insignis
- Collared falconet, Microhierax caerulescens
- Black-thighed falconet, Microhierax fringillarius
- White-fronted falconet, Microhierax latifrons
- Philippine falconet, Microhierax erythrogenys
- Pied falconet, Microhierax melanoleucos
- Lesser kestrel, Falco naumanni
- Eurasian kestrel, Falco tinnunculus
- Spotted kestrel, Falco moluccensis
- Nankeen kestrel, Falco cenchroides
- American kestrel, Falco sparverius (A)
- Red-necked falcon, Falco chicquera
- Red-footed falcon, Falco vespertinus
- Amur falcon, Falco amurensis
- Eleonora's falcon, Falco eleonorae
- Sooty falcon, Falco concolor
- Merlin, Falco columbarius
- Eurasian hobby, Falco subbuteo
- Oriental hobby, Falco severus
- Australian hobby, Falco longipennis
- Brown falcon, Falco berigora
- Gray falcon, Falco hypoleucos
- Lanner falcon, Falco biarmicus
- Laggar falcon, Falco jugger
- Saker falcon, Falco cherrug
- Gyrfalcon, Falco rusticolus
- Peregrine falcon, Falco peregrinus
  - Barbary falcon, Falco peregrinus pelegrinoides
- Black falcon, Falco subniger
- Malagasy kestrel, Falco newtoni
- Seychelles kestrel, Falco araea

== Cockatoos ==
Order: Psittaciformes Family: Cacatuidae

The cockatoos share many features with other parrots including the characteristic curved beak shape and a zygodactyl foot, with two forward toes and two backwards toes. They differ, however in a number of characteristics, including the often spectacular movable headcrest.

- Palm cockatoo, Probosciger aterrimus
- Little corella, Cacatua sanguinea
- Tanimbar corella, Cacatua goffiniana
- Philippine cockatoo, Cacatua haematuropygia
- Yellow-crested cockatoo, Cacatua sulphurea
- Sulphur-crested cockatoo, Cacatua galerita
  - Eleonora cockatoo, Cacatua galerita eleonora
- Salmon-crested cockatoo, Cacatua moluccensis
- White cockatoo, Cacatua alba

== Old World parrots ==
Order: Psittaciformes Family: Psittaculidae

Characteristic features of parrots include a strong curved bill, an upright stance, strong legs, and clawed zygodactyl feet. Many parrots are vividly coloured, and some are multi-coloured. In size they range from 8 cm (3.1 in) to 1 m (3.3 ft) in length. Old World parrots are found from Africa east across south and southeast Asia and Oceania to Australia and New Zealand.

- Pesquet's parrot, Psittrichas fulgidus
- Yellow-capped pygmy-parrot, Micropsitta keiensis
- Geelvink pygmy-parrot, Micropsitta geelvinkiana
- Buff-faced pygmy-parrot, Micropsitta pusio
- Red-breasted pygmy-parrot, Micropsitta bruijnii
- Meek's pygmy-parrot, Micropsitta meeki
- Finsch's pygmy-parrot, Micropsitta finschii
- Moluccan king-parrot, Alisterus amboinensis
- Papuan king-parrot, Alisterus chloropterus
- Australian king-parrot, Alisterus scapularis
- Olive-shouldered parrot, Aprosmictus jonquillaceus
- Red-winged parrot, Aprosmictus erythropterus
- Buru racket-tail, Prioniturus mada
- Golden-mantled racket-tail, Prioniturus platurus
- Mindanao racket-tail, Prioniturus waterstradti
- Luzon racket-tail, Prioniturus montanus
- Blue-headed racket-tail, Prioniturus platenae
- Mindoro racket-tail, Prioniturus mindorensis
- Blue-winged racket-tail, Prioniturus verticalis
- Yellow-breasted racket-tail, Prioniturus flavicans
- Green racket-tail, Prioniturus luconensis
- Blue-crowned racket-tail, Prioniturus discurus
- Eclectus parrot, Eclectus roratus
- Red-cheeked parrot, Geoffroyus geoffroyi
- Blue-collared parrot, Geoffroyus simplex
- Singing parrot, Geoffroyus heteroclitus
- Blue-rumped parrot, Psittinus cyanurus
- Alexandrine parakeet, Psittacula eupatria
- Rose-ringed parakeet, Psittacula krameri
- Slaty-headed parakeet, Psittacula himalayana
- Gray-headed parakeet, Psittacula finschii
- Plum-headed parakeet, Psittacula cyanocephala
- Blossom-headed parakeet, Psittacula roseata
- Malabar parakeet, Psittacula columboides
- Layard's parakeet, Psittacula calthrapae
- Derbyan parakeet, Psittacula derbiana
- Red-breasted parakeet, Psittacula alexandri
- Nicobar parakeet, Psittacula caniceps
- Long-tailed parakeet, Psittacula longicauda
- Painted tiger-parrot, Psittacella picta
- Brehm's tiger-parrot, Psittacella brehmii
- Modest tiger-parrot, Psittacella modesta
- Madarasz's tiger-parrot, Psittacella madaraszi
- Black-lored parrot, Tanygnathus gramineus
- Great-billed parrot, Tanygnathus megalorynchos
- Blue-naped parrot, Tanygnathus lucionensis
- Azure-rumped parrot, Tanygnathus sumatranus
- Yellow-billed lorikeet, Neopsittacus musschenbroekii
- Orange-billed lorikeet, Neopsittacus pullicauda
- Orange-breasted fig-parrot, Cyclopsitta gulielmitertii
- Double-eyed fig-parrot, Cyclopsitta diophthalma
- Large fig-parrot, Psittaculirostris desmarestii
- Edwards's fig-parrot, Psittaculirostris edwardsii
- Salvadori's fig-parrot, Psittaculirostris salvadorii
- Guaiabero, Bolbopsittacus lunulatus
- Budgerigar, Melopsittacus undulatus (I)
- Plum-faced lorikeet, Oreopsittacus arfaki
- Pygmy lorikeet, Charminetta wilhelminae
- Red-fronted lorikeet, Hypocharmosyna rubronotata
- Red-flanked lorikeet, Hypocharmosyna placentis
- Blue-fronted lorikeet, Charmosynopsis toxopei
- Fairy lorikeet, Charmosynopsis pulchella
- Striated lorikeet, Synorhacma multistriata
- Duchess lorikeet, Charmosynoides margarethae
- Red-chinned lorikeet, Charmosyna rubrigularis
- Josephine's lorikeet, Charmosyna josefinae
- Papuan lorikeet, Charmosyna papou
- Meek's lorikeet, Charmosyna meeki
- Red-throated lorikeet, Charmosyna amabilis
- Black lory, Chalcopsitta atra
- Brown lory, Chalcopsitta duivenbodei
- Yellow-streaked lory, Chalcopsitta scintillata
- Chattering lory, Lorius garrulus
- Purple-naped lory, Lorius domicella
- Black-capped lory, Lorius lory
- Purple-bellied lory, Lorius hypoinochrous
- White-naped lory, Lorius albidinuchus
- Goldie's lorikeet, Glossoptila goldiei
- Red-and-blue lory, Eos histrio
- Violet-necked lory, Eos squamata
- Red lory, Eos bornea
- Blue-streaked lory, Eos reticulata
- Black-winged lory, Eos cyanogenia
- Blue-eared lory, Eos semilarvata
- Dusky lory, Pseudeos fuscata
- Cardinal lory, Pseudeos cardinalis
- Ornate lorikeet, Saudareos ornatus
- Mindanao lorikeet, Saudareos johnstoniae
- Iris lorikeet, Saudareos iris
- Yellow-cheeked lorikeet, Saudareos meyeri
- Sula lorikeet, Saudareos flavoviridis
- Sunset lorikeet, Trichoglossus forsteni
- Leaf lorikeet, Trichoglossus weberi
- Marigold lorikeet, Trichoglossus capistratus
- Coconut lorikeet, Trichoglossus haematodus
- Red-collared lorikeet, Trichoglossus rubritorquis
- Olive-headed lorikeet, Trichoglossus euteles
- Rainbow lorikeet, Trichoglossus moluccanus
- Vernal hanging-parrot, Loriculus vernalis
- Sri Lanka hanging-parrot, Loriculus beryllinus
- Philippine hanging-parrot, Loriculus philippensis
- Camiguin hanging-parrot, Loriculus camiguinensis
- Blue-crowned hanging-parrot, Loriculus galgulus
- Sulawesi hanging-parrot, Loriculus stigmatus
- Sula hanging-parrot, Loriculus sclateri
- Moluccan hanging-parrot, Loriculus amabilis
- Sangihe hanging-parrot, Loriculus catamene
- Papuan hanging-parrot, Loriculus aurantiifrons
- Pygmy hanging-parrot, Loriculus exilis
- Yellow-throated hanging-parrot, Loriculus pusillus
- Wallace's hanging-parrot, Loriculus flosculus
- Green-fronted hanging-parrot, Loriculus tener
- Niam-Niam parrot, Poicephalus crassus
- Yellow-crowned parrot, Amazona ochrocephala
- Turquoise-fronted parrot, Amazona aestiva
- Monk parakeet, Myiopsitta monachus
- Rosy-faced lovebird, Agapornis roseicollis
- Nyasa lovebird, Agapornis lilianae
- Yellow-collared lovebird, Agapornis personatus
- Fischer's lovebird, Agapornis fishcheri
- Red-headed lovebird, Agapornis pullarius
- Nanday parakeet, Aratinga nenday
- Eastern rosella, Platycercus eximius
- Crimson rosella, Platycercus elegans
- Pale-headed rosella, Platycercus adscitus
- Western rosella, Platycercus icterotis
- Dusky parrot, Pionus fuscus
- Red-masked parakeet, Psittacara erythrogenys
- Blue-crowned parakeet, Psittacara acuticaudatus
- Crimson shining-parrot, Prosopeia splendens
- Red shining-parrot, Prosopeia tabuensis
- Masked shining-parrot, Prosopeia personata
- Collared lory, Phigys solitarius
- Blue-crowned lorikeet, Vini australis

== Tyrant flycatchers ==
- Great kiskadee, Pitangus sulphuratus
- Olive-sided flycatcher, Contopus cooperi
- Eastern wood-pewee, Contopus virnes
- Yellow-bellied flycatcher, Empidonax flaviventris
- Acadian flycatcher, Empidonax virescens
- Alder flycatcher, Empidonax alnorum
- Least flycatcher, Empidonax minimus
- Eastern phoebe, Sayornis phoebe
- Western kingbird, Tyrannus verticalis
- Eastern kingbird, Tyrannus tyrannus
- Fork-tailed flycatcher, Tyrannus savana

== African and green broadbills ==
Order: Passeriformes Family: Calyptomenidae

The African and green broadbills are small, brightly coloured birds which feed on fruit and also take insects in flycatcher fashion, snapping their broad bills. Their habitat is canopies of wet forests.

- Green broadbill, Calyptomena viridis
- Hose's broadbill, Calyptomena hosii
- Whitehead's broadbill, Calyptomena whiteheadi

== Asian and Grauer's broadbills ==
Order: Passeriformes Family: Eurylaimidae

The Asian and Grauer's broadbills are small, brightly colored birds, which feed on fruit and also take insects in flycatcher fashion, snapping their broad bills. Their habitat is canopies of wet forests.

- Black-and-red broadbill, Cymbirhynchus macrorhynchos
- Long-tailed broadbill, Psarisomus dalhousiae
- Silver-breasted broadbill, Serilophus lunatus
- Banded broadbill, Eurylaimus javanicus
- Black-and-yellow broadbill, Eurylaimus ochromalus
- Wattled broadbill, Sarcophanops steerii
- Visayan broadbill, Sarcophanops samarensis
- Dusky broadbill, Corydon sumatranus

== Pittas ==
Order: Passeriformes Family: Pittidae

Pittas are medium-sized stocky passerines with fairly long, strong legs, short tails, and stout bills. Many are brightly coloured. They spend the majority of their time on wet forest floors, eating snails, insects, and similar invertebrate prey.

- Whiskered pitta, Erythropitta kochi
- Blue-breasted pitta, Erythropitta erythrogaster
- Sangihe pitta, Erythropitta caeruleitorques
- Siau pitta, Erythropitta palliceps
- Sulawesi pitta, Erythropitta celebensis
- Sula pitta, Erythropitta dohertyi
- North Moluccan pitta, Erythropitta rufiventris
- South Moluccan pitta, Erythropitta rubrinucha
- Papuan pitta, Erythropitta macklotii
- Graceful pitta, Erythropitta venusta
- Black-crowned pitta, Erythropitta ussheri
- Blue-banded pitta, Erythropitta arcuata
- Garnet pitta, Erythropitta granatina
- New Ireland pitta, Erythropitta novaehibernicae
- Tabar pitta, Erythropitta splendida
- New Britain pitta, Erythropitta gazellae
- Louisiade pitta, Erythropitta meeki
- Eared pitta, Hydrornis phayrei
- Rusty-naped pitta, Hydrornis oatesi
- Blue-naped pitta, Hydrornis nipalensis
- Blue-rumped pitta, Hydrornis soror
- Giant pitta, Hydrornis caerulea
- Schneider's pitta, Hydrornis schneideri
- Malayan banded-pitta, Hydrornis irena
- Javan banded-pitta, Hydrornis guajana
- Bornean banded-pitta, Hydrornis schwaneri
- Blue-headed pitta, Hydrornis baudii
- Blue pitta, Hydrornis cyanea
- Bar-bellied pitta, Hydrornis elliotii
- Gurney's pitta, Hydrornis gurneyi
- Indian pitta, Pitta brachyura
- Blue-winged pitta, Pitta moluccensis
- Fairy pitta, Pitta nympha
- Hooded pitta, Pitta sordida
- Azure-breasted pitta, Pitta steerii
- Noisy pitta, Pitta versicolor
- Ivory-breasted pitta, Pitta maxima
- Ornate pitta, Pitta concinna
- Elegant pitta, Pitta elegans
- Banda Sea pitta, Pitta vigorsii
- Mangrove pitta, Pitta megarhyncha
- Black-faced pitta, Pitta anerythra
- Superb pitta, Pitta superba

== Bowerbirds ==
Order: Passeriformes Family: Ptilonorhynchidae

The bowerbirds are small to medium-sized passerine birds. The males notably build a bower to attract a mate. Depending on the species, the bower ranges from a circle of cleared earth with a small pile of twigs in the center to a complex and highly decorated structure of sticks and leaves.

- White-eared catbird, Ailuroedus buccoides
- Ochre-breasted catbird, Ailuroedus stonii
- Tan-capped catbird, Ailuroedus geislerorum
- Northern catbird, Ailuroedus jobiensis
- Arfak catbird, Ailuroedus arfakianus
- Black-eared catbird, Ailuroedus melanotis
- Huon catbird, Ailuroedus astigmaticus
- Black-capped catbird, Ailuroedus melanocephalus
- Archbold's bowerbird, Archboldia papuensis
- Vogelkop bowerbird, Amblyornis inornata
- MacGregor's bowerbird, Amblyornis macgregoriae
- Streaked bowerbird, Amblyornis subalaris
- Golden-fronted bowerbird, Amblyornis flavifrons
- Masked bowerbird, Sericulus aureus
- Flame bowerbird, Sericulus ardens
- Fire-maned bowerbird, Sericulus bakeri
- Yellow-breasted bowerbird, Chlamydera lauterbachi
- Fawn-breasted bowerbird, Chlamydera cerviniventris

== Australasian treecreepers ==
Order: Passeriformes Family: Climacteridae

The Climacteridae are medium-small, mostly brown-coloured birds with patterning on their underparts. They are endemic to Australia and New Guinea.

- Papuan treecreeper, Cormobates placens

== Fairywrens ==
Order: Passeriformes Family: Maluridae

Maluridae is a family of small, insectivorous passerine birds endemic to Australia and New Guinea. They are socially monogamous and sexually promiscuous, meaning that although they form pairs between one male and one female, each partner will mate with other individuals and even assist in raising the young from such pairings.

- Wallace's fairywren, Sipodotus wallacii
- Orange-crowned fairywren, Clytomyias insignis
- Broad-billed fairywren, Chenorhamphus grayi
- Campbell's fairywren, Chenorhamphus campbelli
- Emperor fairywren, Malurus cyanocephalus
- White-shouldered fairywren, Malurus alboscapulatus

== Honeyeaters ==
Order: Passeriformes Family: Meliphagidae

The honeyeaters are a large and diverse family of small to medium-sized birds most common in Australia and New Guinea. They are nectar feeders and closely resemble other nectar-feeding passerines.

- Dark-eared myza, Myza celebensis
- White-eared myza, Myza sarasinorum
- Plain honeyeater, Pycnopygius ixoides
- Marbled honeyeater, Pycnopygius cinereus
- Streak-headed honeyeater, Pycnopygius stictocephalus
- Orange-cheeked honeyeater, Oreornis chrysogenys
- Puff-backed honeyeater, Meliphaga aruensis
- Yellow-spotted honeyeater, Meliphaga notata
- Scrub honeyeater, Microptilotis albonotatus
- Mountain honeyeater, Microptilotis orientalis
- Mimic honeyeater, Microptilotis analogus
- Forest honeyeater, Microptilotis montanus
- Mottled honeyeater, Microptilotis mimikae
- Yellow-gaped honeyeater, Microptilotis flavirictus
- Tagula honeyeater, Microptilotis vicina
- Graceful honeyeater, Microptilotis gracilis
- Elegant honeyeater, Microptilotis cinereifrons
- Streak-breasted honeyeater, Territornis reticulata
- Black-throated honeyeater, Caligavis subfrenata
- Obscure honeyeater, Caligavis obscura
- Sooty melidectes, Melidectes fuscus
- Short-bearded melidectes, Melidectes nouhuysi
- Ornate melidectes, Melidectes torquatus
- Cinnamon-browed melidectes, Melidectes ochromelas
- Vogelkop melidectes, Melidectes leucostephes
- Huon melidectes, Melidectes foersteri
- Belford's melidectes, Melidectes belfordi
- Yellow-browed melidectes, Melidectes rufocrissalis
- Long-bearded melidectes, Melidectes princeps
- Varied honeyeater, Gavicalis versicolor
- Yellow-tinted honeyeater, Ptilotula flavescens
- Bougainville honeyeater, Stresemannia bougainvillei
- Brown-backed honeyeater, Ramsayornis modestus
- Rufous-banded honeyeater, Conopophila albogularis
- Arfak honeyeater, Melipotes gymnops
- Smoky honeyeater, Melipotes fumigatus
- Foja honeyeater, Melipotes carolae
- Spangled honeyeater, Melipotes ater
- MacGregor's honeyeater, Macgregoria pulchra
- Long-billed honeyeater, Melilestes megarhynchus
- Olive straightbill, Timeliopsis fulvigula
- Tawny straightbill, Timeliopsis griseigula
- Bismarck honeyeater, Vosea whitemanensis
- Seram myzomela, Myzomela blasii
- Ruby-throated myzomela, Myzomela eques
- Dusky myzomela, Myzomela obscura
- Red myzomela, Myzomela cruentata
- Papuan black myzomela, Myzomela nigrita
- Alor myzomela, Myzomela prawiradilagae
- Crimson-hooded myzomela, Myzomela kuehni
- Red-headed myzomela, Myzomela erythrocephala
- Sumba myzomela, Myzomela dammermani
- Rote myzomela, Myzomela irianawidodoae
- Elfin myzomela, Myzomela adolphinae
- Sulawesi myzomela, Myzomela chloroptera
- Taliabu myzomela, Myzomela wahe
- Wakolo myzomela, Myzomela wakoloensis
- Banda myzomela, Myzomela boiei
- Sclater's myzomela, Myzomela sclateri
- Black-breasted myzomela, Myzomela vulnerata
- Red-collared myzomela, Myzomela rosenbergii
- White-chinned myzomela, Myzomela albigula
- Ashy myzomela, Myzomela cineracea
- New Ireland myzomela, Myzomela pulchella
- Bismarck black myzomela, Myzomela pammelaena
- Scarlet-naped myzomela, Myzomela lafargei
- Yellow-vented myzomela, Myzomela eichhorni
- Black-bellied myzomela, Myzomela erythromelas
- Rotuma myzomela, Myzomela chermesina
- Orange-breasted myzomela, Myzomela jugularis
- Green-backed honeyeater, Glycichaera fallax
- Leaden honeyeater, Ptiloprora plumbea
- Yellow-streaked honeyeater, Ptiloprora meekiana
- Rufous-sided honeyeater, Ptiloprora erythropleura
- Mayr's honeyeater, Ptiloprora mayri
- Gray-streaked honeyeater, Ptiloprora perstriata
- Rufous-backed honeyeater, Ptiloprora guisei
- Sunda honeyeater, Lichmera lombokia
- Olive honeyeater, Lichmera argentauris
- Brown honeyeater, Lichmera indistincta
- White-tufted honeyeater, Lichmera squamata
- Silver-eared honeyeater, Lichmera alboauricularis
- Buru honeyeater, Lichmera deningeri
- Seram honeyeater, Lichmera monticola
- Yellow-eared honeyeater, Lichmera flavicans
- Black-chested honeyeater, Lichmera notabilis
- Blue-faced honeyeater, Entomyzon cyanotis
- White-throated honeyeater, Melithreptus albogularis
- Tawny-breasted honeyeater, Xanthotis flaviventer
- Spotted honeyeater, Xanthotis polygrammus
- White-streaked friarbird, Melitograis gilolensis
- Little friarbird, Philemon citreogularis
- Meyer's friarbird, Philemon meyeri
- Timor friarbird, Philemon inornatus
- Gray friarbird, Philemon kisserensis
- Brass's friarbird, Philemon brassi
- Dusky friarbird, Philemon fuscicapillus
- Buru friarbird, Philemon moluccensis
- Tanimbar friarbird, Philemon plumigenis
- Seram friarbird, Philemon subcorniculatus
- Helmeted friarbird, Philemon buceroides
- Noisy friarbird, Philemon corniculatus
- Silver-crowned friarbird, Philemon argenticeps
- New Ireland friarbird, Philemon eichhorni
- White-naped friarbird, Philemon albitorques
- New Britain friarbird, Philemon cockerelli
- Kadavu honeyeater, Meliphacator provocator
- Chattering giant-honeyeater, Gymnomyza viridis
- Duetting giant-honeyeater, Gymnomyza brunneirostris
- Western wattled-honeyeater, Foulehaio procerior
- Eastern wattled-honeyeater, Foulehaio carunculatus
- Northern wattled-honeyeater, Foulehaio taviuensis

== Thornbills and allies ==
Order: Passeriformes Family: Acanthizidae

The Acanthizidae are small- to medium-sized birds with short rounded wings, slender bills, long legs, and a short tail. The golden-bellied gerygone is the only member of the family found in mainland Asia.

- Goldenface, Pachycare flavogriseum
- Rusty mouse-warbler, Crateroscelis murina
- Bicolored mouse-warbler, Crateroscelis nigrorufa
- Mountain mouse-warbler, Crateroscelis robusta
- Tropical scrubwren, Sericornis beccarii
- Large scrubwren, Sericornis nouhuysi
- Vogelkop scrubwren, Sericornis rufescens
- Buff-faced scrubwren, Sericornis perspicillatus
- Papuan scrubwren, Sericornis papuensis
- Gray-green scrubwren, Sericornis arfakianus
- Pale-billed scrubwren, Sericornis spilodera
- Papuan thornbill, Acanthiza murina
- Gray thornbill, Acanthiza cinerea
- Green-backed gerygone, Gerygone chloronota
- Fairy gerygone, Gerygone palpebrosa
- Biak gerygone, Gerygone hypoxantha
- White-throated gerygone, Gerygone olivacea
- Yellow-bellied gerygone, Gerygone chrysogaster
- Large-billed gerygone, Gerygone magnirostris
- Golden-bellied gerygone, Gerygone sulphurea
- Plain gerygone, Gerygone inornata
- Rufous-sided gerygone, Gerygone dorsalis
- Brown-breasted gerygone, Gerygone ruficollis
- Mangrove gerygone, Gerygone levigaster
- Western gerygone, Gerygone fusca

== Pseudo-babblers ==
Order: Passeriformes Family: Pomatostomidae

The pseudo-babblers are small to medium-sized birds endemic to Australia and New Guinea. They are ground-feeding omnivores and highly social.

- Papuan babbler, Pomatostomus isidorei
- Gray-crowned babbler, Pomatostomus temporalis

== Logrunners ==
Order: Passeriformes Family: Orthonychidae

The Orthonychidae is a family of birds with a single genus, Orthonyx, which comprises two types of passerine birds endemic to Australia and New Guinea, the logrunners and the chowchilla. Both use stiffened tails to brace themselves when feeding.

- Papuan logrunner, Orthonyx novaeguineae

== Quail-thrushes and jewel-babblers ==
Order: Passeriformes Family: Cinclosomatidae

The Cinclosomatidae is a family containing jewel-babblers and quail-thrushes.

- Painted quail-thrush, Cinclosoma ajax
- Spotted jewel-babbler, Ptilorrhoa leucosticta
- Blue jewel-babbler, Ptilorrhoa caerulescens
- Chestnut-backed jewel-babbler, Ptilorrhoa castanonota
- Dimorphic jewel-babbler, Ptilorrhoa geislerorum

== Cuckooshrikes ==
Order: Passeriformes Family: Campephagidae

The cuckooshrikes are small to medium-sized passerine birds. They are predominantly greyish with white and black, although some minivet species are brightly coloured.

- White-bellied minivet, Pericrocotus erythropygius
- Jerdon's minivet, Pericrocotus albifrons
- Fiery minivet, Pericrocotus igneus
- Small minivet, Pericrocotus cinnamomeus
- Gray-chinned minivet, Pericrocotus solaris
- Sunda minivet, Pericrocotus miniatus
- Short-billed minivet, Pericrocotus brevirostris
- Flores minivet, Pericrocotus lansbergei
- Long-tailed minivet, Pericrocotus ethologus
- Orange minivet, Pericrocotus flammeus
- Scarlet minivet, Pericrocotus speciosus
- Ryukyu minivet, Pericrocotus tegimae
- Ashy minivet, Pericrocotus divaricatus
- Brown-rumped minivet, Pericrocotus cantonensis
- Rosy minivet, Pericrocotus roseus
- Stout-billed cuckooshrike, Coracina caeruleogrisea
- Hooded cuckooshrike, Coracina longicauda
- Pied cuckooshrike, Coracina bicolor
- Cerulean cuckooshrike, Coracina temminckii
- Barred cuckooshrike, Coracina lineata
- Boyer's cuckooshrike, Coracina boyeri
- Black-faced cuckooshrike, Coracina novaehollandiae
- White-bellied cuckooshrike, Coracina papuensis
- Moluccan cuckooshrike, Coracina atriceps
- Large cuckooshrike, Coracina macei
- Bar-bellied cuckooshrike, Coracina striata
- Andaman cuckooshrike, Coracina dobsoni
- Sunda cuckooshrike, Coracina larvata
- Javan cuckooshrike, Coracina javensis
- Wallacean cuckooshrike, Coracina personata
- Buru cuckooshrike, Coracina fortis
- White-rumped cuckooshrike, Coracina leucopygia
- Slaty cuckooshrike, Coracina schistacea
- Golden cuckooshrike, Coracina sloetii
- McGregor's cuckooshrike, Coracina mcgregori
- White-shouldered triller, Lalage sueurii
- Black-browed triller, Lalage atrovirens
- White-browed triller, Lalage moesta
- Varied triller, Lalage leucomela
- Black-and-white triller, Lalage melanoleuca
- White-rumped triller, Lalage leucopygialis
- Pied triller, Lalage nigra
- Rufous-bellied triller, Lalage aurea
- Black-winged cuckooshrike, Lalage melaschistos
- Black-headed cuckooshrike, Lalage melanoptera
- Lesser cuckooshrike, Lalage fimbriata
- Indochinese cuckooshrike, Lalage polioptera
- Polynesian triller, Lalage maculosa
- Pygmy cuckooshrike, Celebesia abbotti
- Halmahera cuckooshrike, Celebesia parvula
- Blackish cuckooshrike, Analisoma coerulescens
- White-winged cuckooshrike, Analisoma ostenta
- Black-bellied cicadabird, Edolisoma montanum
- Pale cicadabird, Edolisoma ceramense
- Kai cicadabird, Edolisoma dispar
- Pale-shouldered cicadabird, Edolisoma dohertyi
- Black-bibbed cicadabird, Edolisoma mindanense
- Papuan cicadabird, Edolisoma incertum
- Sulawesi cicadabird, Edolisoma morio
- Sula cicadabird, Edolisoma sula
- Common cicadabird, Edolisoma tenuirostre
- Gray-headed cicadabird, Edolisoma schisticeps
- Black cicadabird, Edolisoma melas

== Sittellas ==
Order: Passeriformes Family: Neosittidae

The sittellas are a family of small passerine birds. They resemble treecreepers, but have soft tails.

- Black sittella, Daphoenositta miranda
- Papuan sittella, Daphoenositta papuensis
- Varied sittella, Daphoenositta chrysoptera

== Whipbirds and wedgebills ==
Order: Passeriformes Family: Psophodidae

The Psophodidae is a family containing whipbirds and wedgebills.

- Papuan whipbird, Androphobus viridis

== Ploughbill ==
Order: Passeriformes Family: Eulacestomidae

The wattled ploughbill was long thought to be related to the whistlers (Pachycephalidae), and shriketits (formerly Pachycephalidae, now often treated as its own family).

- Wattled ploughbill, Eulacestoma nigropectus

== Australo-Papuan bellbirds ==
Order: Passeriformes Family: Oreoicidae

The three species contained in the family have been moved around between different families for fifty years. A series of studies of the DNA of Australian birds between 2006 and 2001 found strong support for treating the three genera as a new family, which was formally named in 2016.

- Rufous-naped bellbird, Aleadryas rufinucha
- Piping bellbird, Ornorectes cristatus

== Tit berrypecker and crested berrypecker ==
Order: Passeriformes Family: Paramythiidae

Paramythiidae is a very small bird family restricted to the mountain forests of New Guinea. The two species are colourful medium-sized birds which feed on fruit and some insects.

- Tit berrypecker, Oreocharis arfaki
- Crested berrypecker, Paramythia montium

== Vireos, shrike-babblers, and erpornis ==
Order: Passeriformes Family: Vireonidae

Most of the members of this family are found in the New World. However, the shrike-babblers and erpornis, which only slightly resemble the "true" vireos and greenlets, are found in South East Asia.

- Black-headed shrike-babbler, Pteruthius rufiventer
- Pied shrike-babbler, Pteruthius flaviscapis
- White-browed shrike-babbler, Pteruthius aeralatus
- Green shrike-babbler, Pteruthius xanthochlorus
- Black-eared shrike-babbler, Pteruthius melanotis
- Trilling shrike-babbler, Pteruthius aenobarbus
- Clicking shrike-babbler, Pteruthius intermedius
- White-bellied erpornis, Erpornis zantholeuca

== Whistlers and allies ==
Order: Passeriformes Family: Pachycephalidae

The family Pachycephalidae includes the whistlers, shrikethrushes, and some of the pitohuis.

- Rusty pitohui, Pseudorectes ferrugineus
- White-bellied pitohui, Pseudorectes incertus
- Gray shrikethrush, Colluricincla harmonica
- Sooty shrikethrush, Colluricincla tenebrosa
- Waigeo shrikethrush, Colluricincla affinis
- Mamberamo shrikethrush, Colluricincla obscura
- Arafura shrikethrush, Colluricincla megarhyncha
- Rufous shrikethrush, Colluricincla rufogaster
- Black pitohui, Melanorectes nigrescens
- Sangihe whistler, Coracornis sanghirensis
- Maroon-backed whistler, Coracornis raveni
- Bare-throated whistler, Pachycephala nudigula
- Fawn-breasted whistler, Pachycephala orpheus
- Regent whistler, Pachycephala schlegelii
- Vogelkop whistler, Pachycephala meyeri
- Sclater's whistler, Pachycephala soror
- Rusty-breasted whistler, Pachycephala fulvotincta
- Yellow-throated whistler, Pachycephala macrorhyncha
- Black-chinned whistler, Pachycephala mentalis
- Baliem whistler, Pachycephala balim
- Black-tailed whistler, Pachycephala melanura
- Morningbird, Pachycephala tenebrosa
- Brown-backed whistler, Pachycephala modesta
- Lorentz's whistler, Pachycephala lorentzi
- Golden-backed whistler, Pachycephala aurea
- Yellow-bellied whistler, Pachycephala philippinensis
- Bornean whistler, Pachycephala hypoxantha
- Sulphur-bellied whistler, Pachycephala sulfuriventer
- Mangrove whistler, Pachycephala cinerea
- Green-backed whistler, Pachycephala albiventris
- White-vented whistler, Pachycephala homeyeri
- Island whistler, Pachycephala phaionota
- Biak whistler, Pachycephala melanorhyncha
- Rusty whistler, Pachycephala hyperythra
- Gray whistler, Pachycephala simplex
- Wallacean whistler, Pachycephala arctitorquis
- Drab whistler, Pachycephala griseonota
- White-bellied whistler, Pachycephala leucogastra
- Black-headed whistler, Pachycephala monacha
- Rufous whistler, Pachycephala rufiventris
- Fiji whistler, Pachycephala vitiensis

== Old World orioles ==
Order: Passeriformes Family: Oriolidae

The Old World orioles are colourful passerine birds which are not closely related to the New World orioles.

- Hooded pitohui, Pitohui dichrous
- Raja Ampat pitohui, Pitohui cerviniventris
- Northern variable pitohui, Pitohui kirhocephalus
- Southern variable pitohui, Pitohui uropygialis
- Timor oriole, Oriolus melanotis
- Buru oriole, Oriolus bouroensis
- Tanimbar oriole, Oriolus decipiens
- Seram oriole, Oriolus forsteni
- Halmahera oriole, Oriolus phaeochromus
- Brown oriole, Oriolus szalayi
- Olive-backed oriole, Oriolus sagittatus
- Green oriole, Oriolus flavocinctus
- Dark-throated oriole, Oriolus xanthonotus
- White-lored oriole, Oriolus albiloris
- Philippine oriole, Oriolus steerii
- Isabela oriole, Oriolus isabellae
- Eurasian golden oriole, Oriolus oriolus
- Indian golden oriole, Oriolus kundoo
- Black-naped oriole, Oriolus chinensis
- Slender-billed oriole, Oriolus tenuirostris
- Black-hooded oriole, Oriolus xanthornus
- Black oriole, Oriolus hosii
- Black-and-crimson oriole, Oriolus cruentus
- Maroon oriole, Oriolus traillii
- Silver oriole, Oriolus mellianus
- Wetar figbird, Sphecotheres hypoleucus
- Green figbird, Sphecotheres viridis
- Australasian figbird, Sphecotheres vieilloti

== Boatbills ==
Order: Passeriformes Family: Machaerirhynchidae

The boatbills have affinities to woodswallows and butcherbirds, and are distributed across New Guinea and northern Queensland.

- Black-breasted boatbill, Machaerirhynchus nigripectus
- Yellow-breasted boatbill, Machaerirhynchus flaviventer

== Woodswallows, bellmagpies and allies ==
Order: Passeriformes Family: Artamidae

The woodswallows are soft-plumaged, somber-coloured passerine birds. They are smooth, agile flyers with moderately large, semi-triangular wings. The cracticids: currawongs, bellmagpies and butcherbirds, are similar to the other corvids. They have large, straight bills and mostly black, white or grey plumage. All are omnivorous to some degree.

- Ashy woodswallow, Artamus fuscus
- Ivory-backed woodswallow, Artamus monachus
- Great woodswallow, Artamus maximus
- White-breasted woodswallow, Artamus leucorynchus
- Black-faced woodswallow, Artamus cinereus
- Fiji woodswallow, Artamus mentalis
- Mountain peltops, Peltops montanus
- Lowland peltops, Peltops blainvillii
- Black-backed butcherbird, Cracticus mentalis
- Hooded butcherbird, Cracticus cassicus
- Tagula butcherbird, Cracticus louisiadensis
- Black butcherbird, Cracticus quoyi
- Australian magpie, Gymnorhina tibicen

== Mottled berryhunter ==
Order: Passeriformes Family: Rhagologidae

The mottled berryhunter or mottled whistler (Rhagologus leucostigma) is a species of bird whose relationships are unclear but most likely related to the woodswallows, boatbills and butcherbirds.

- Mottled berryhunter, Rhagologus leucostigma

== Vangas, helmetshrikes, and allies ==
Order: Passeriformes Family: Vangidae

The family Vangidae is highly variable, though most members of it resemble true shrikes to some degree.

- Malabar woodshrike, Tephrodornis sylvicola
- Large woodshrike, Tephrodornis gularis
- Common woodshrike, Tephrodornis pondicerianus
- Sri Lanka woodshrike, Tephrodornis affinis
- Bar-winged flycatcher-shrike, Hemipus picatus
- Black-winged flycatcher-shrike, Hemipus hirundinaceus
- Rufous-winged philentoma, Philentoma pyrhoptera
- Maroon-breasted philentoma, Philentoma velata

== Ioras ==
Order: Passeriformes Family: Aegithinidae

The ioras are bulbul-like birds of open forest or thorn scrub, but whereas that group tends to be drab in colouration, ioras are sexually dimorphic, with the males being brightly plumaged in yellows and greens.

- Common iora, Aegithina tiphia
- White-tailed iora, Aegithina nigrolutea
- Green iora, Aegithina viridissima
- Great iora, Aegithina lafresnayei

== Bristlehead ==
Order: Passeriformes Family: Pityriasidae

The Bornean bristlehead (Pityriasis gymnocephala), also variously known as the bristled shrike, bald-headed crow or the bald-headed wood-shrike, is the only member of the passerine family Pityriasidae and genus Pityriasis. It is an enigmatic and uncommon species of the rainforest canopy of the island of Borneo, to which it is endemic.

- Bornean bristlehead, Pityriasis gymnocephala

== Bushshrikes and allies ==
Order: Passeriformes Family: Malaconotidae

Bushshrikes are similar in habits to shrikes, hunting insects and other small prey from a perch on a bush. Although similar in build to the shrikes, these tend to be either colourful species or largely black; some species are quite secretive.

- Black-crowned tchagra, Tchagra senegalus
- Rosy-patched bushshrike, Rhodophoneus cruentus

== Fantails ==
Order: Passeriformes Family: Rhipiduridae

The fantails are small insectivorous birds with longish, frequently fanned, tails.

- Drongo fantail, Chaetorhynchus papuensis
- Cerulean flycatcher, Eutrichomyias rowleyi
- Black fantail, Rhipidura atra
- Black-and-cinnamon fantail, Rhipidura nigrocinnamomea
- Mindanao blue-fantail, Rhipidura superciliaris
- Visayan blue-fantail, Rhipidura samarensis
- Tablas fantail, Rhipidura sauli
- Visayan fantail, Rhipidura albiventris
- Blue-headed fantail, Rhipidura cyaniceps
- Spotted fantail, Rhipidura perlata
- Cinnamon-tailed fantail, Rhipidura fuscorufa
- Northern fantail, Rhipidura rufiventris
- Brown-capped fantail, Rhipidura diluta
- Sooty thicket-fantail, Rhipidura threnothorax
- Black thicket-fantail, Rhipidura maculipectus
- White-bellied thicket-fantail, Rhipidura leucothorax
- Willie-wagtail, Rhipidura leucophrys
- Malaysian pied-fantail, Rhipidura javanica
- Philippine pied-fantail, Rhipidura nigritorquis
- White-throated fantail, Rhipidura albicollis
- Spot-breasted fantail, Rhipidura albogularis
- Rufous-tailed fantail, Rhipidura phoenicura
- White-bellied fantail, Rhipidura euryura
- White-browed fantail, Rhipidura aureola
- Rufous-backed fantail, Rhipidura rufidorsa
- Dimorphic fantail, Rhipidura brachyrhyncha
- Sulawesi fantail, Rhipidura teysmanni
- Peleng fantail, Rhipidura habibiei
- Taliabu fantail, Rhipidura sulaensis
- Tawny-backed fantail, Rhipidura superflua
- Streak-breasted fantail, Rhipidura dedemi
- Long-tailed fantail, Rhipidura opistherythra
- Rufous fantail, Rhipidura rufifrons
- Arafura fantail, Rhipidura dryas
- Friendly fantail, Rhipidura albolimbata
- Chestnut-bellied fantail, Rhipidura hyperythra
- Mangrove fantail, Rhipidura phasiana
- Streaked fantail, Rhipidura verreauxi
- Kadavu fantail, Rhiphidura personata
- Peleng fantail, Rhiphidura habibiei
- Taveuni silktail, Lamprolia victoriale
- Natewa silktail, Lamprolia klinesmithi

== Drongos ==
Order: Passeriformes Family: Dicruridae

The drongos are mostly black or dark grey in colour, sometimes with metallic tints. They have long forked tails, and some Asian species have elaborate tail decorations. They have short legs and sit very upright when perched, like a shrike. They flycatch or take prey from the ground.

- Black drongo, Dicrurus macrocercus
- Ashy drongo, Dicrurus leucophaeus
- White-bellied drongo, Dicrurus caerulescens
- Crow-billed drongo, Dicrurus annectens
- Bronzed drongo, Dicrurus aeneus
- Lesser racket-tailed drongo, Dicrurus remifer
- Hair-crested drongo, Dicrurus hottentottus
- Balicassiao, Dicrurus balicassius
- Sulawesi drongo, Dicrurus montanus
- Sumatran drongo, Dicrurus sumatranus
- Wallacean drongo, Dicrurus densus
- Spangled drongo, Dicrurus bracteatus
- Tablas drongo, Dicrurus menagei
- Andaman drongo, Dicrurus andamanensis
- Greater racket-tailed drongo, Dicrurus paradiseus
- Sri Lanka drongo, Dicrurus lophorinus

== Birds-of-paradise ==
Order: Passeriformes Family: Paradisaeidae

The birds-of-paradise are best known for the striking plumage possessed by the males of most species, in particular highly elongated and elaborate feathers extending from the tail, wings or head. These plumes are used in courtship displays to attract females.

- Paradise-crow, Lycocorax pyrrhopterus (E)
- Trumpet manucode, Phonygammus keraudrenii
- Curl-crested manucode, Manucodia comrii
- Crinkle-collared manucode, Manucodia chalybatus
- Jobi manucode, Manucodia jobiensis
- Glossy-mantled manucode, Manucodia ater
- King-of-Saxony bird-of-paradise, Pteridophora alberti
- Carola's parotia, Parotia carolae
- Bronze parotia, Parotia berlepschi (A)
- Western parotia, Parotia sefilata
- Wahnes's parotia, Parotia wahnesi
- Lawes's parotia, Parotia lawesii
- Twelve-wired bird-of-paradise, Seleucidis melanoleucus
- Black-billed sicklebill, Drepanornis albertisi
- Pale-billed sicklebill, Drepanornis bruijnii
- Standardwing bird-of-paradise, Semioptera wallacii
- Vogelkop lophorina, Lophorina niedda
- Greater lophorina, Lophorina superba
- Magnificent riflebird, Ptiloris magnificus
- Growling riflebird, Ptiloris intercedens
- Black sicklebill, Epimachus fastuosus
- Brown sicklebill, Epimachus meyeri
- Long-tailed paradigalla, Paradigalla carunculata
- Short-tailed paradigalla, Paradigalla brevicauda
- Splendid astrapia, Astrapia splendidissima
- Arfak astrapia, Astrapia nigra
- Huon astrapia, Astrapia rothschildi
- Ribbon-tailed astrapia, Astrapia mayeri
- Stephanie's astrapia, Astrapia stephaniae
- King bird-of-paradise, Cicinnurus regius
- Wilson's bird-of-paradise, Cicinnurus respublica
- Magnificent bird-of-paradise, Cicinnurus magnificus
- Blue bird-of-paradise, Cicinnurus rudolphi
- Emperor bird-of-paradise, Paradisaea guilielmi
- Red bird-of-paradise, Paradisaea rubra
- Goldie's bird-of-paradise, Paradisaea decora
- Lesser bird-of-paradise, Paradisaea minor
- Greater bird-of-paradise, Paradisaea apoda
- Raggiana bird-of-paradise, Paradisaea raggiana

== Ifrita ==
Order: Passeriformes Family: Ifritidae

The ifritas are a small and insectivorous passerine currently placed in the monotypic family, Ifritidae. Previously, the ifrit has been placed in a plethora of families including Cinclosomatidae or Monarchidae. They are considered an ancient relic species endemic to New Guinea.

- Blue-capped ifrita, Ifrita kowaldi

== Monarch flycatchers ==
Order: Passeriformes Family: Monarchidae

The monarch flycatchers are small to medium-sized insectivorous passerines which hunt by gleaning, hovering or flycatching.

- Short-crested monarch, Hypothymis helenae
- Black-naped monarch, Hypothymis azurea
- Pale-blue monarch, Hypothymis puella
- Celestial monarch, Hypothymis coelestis
- Blue paradise-flycatcher, Terpsiphone cyanescens
- Rufous paradise-flycatcher, Terpsiphone cinnamomea
- Japanese paradise-flycatcher, Terpsiphone atrocaudata
- Amur paradise-flycatcher, Terpsiphone incei
- Blyth's paradise-flycatcher, Terpsiphone affinis
- Indian paradise-flycatcher, Terpsiphone paradisi
- African paradise-flycatcher, Terpsiphone viridis
- White-naped monarch, Carterornis pileatus
- Loetoe monarch, Carterornis castus
- Golden monarch, Carterornis chrysomela
- Island monarch, Monarcha cinerascens
- Black-faced monarch, Monarcha melanopsis
- Black-winged monarch, Monarcha frater
- Fan-tailed monarch, Symposiachrus axillaris
- Rufous monarch, Monarcha rubiensis
- Flores monarch, Symposiachrus sacerdotum
- Black-chinned monarch, Symposiachrus boanensis
- Spectacled monarch, Symposiachrus trivirgatus
- White-tailed monarch, Symposiachrus leucurus
- White-tipped monarch, Symposiachrus everetti
- Black-tipped monarch, Symposiachrus loricatus
- Kofiau monarch, Symposiachrus julianae
- Biak monarch, Symposiachrus brehmii
- Hooded monarch, Symposiachrus manadensis
- Black-bibbed monarch, Symposiachrus mundus
- Spot-winged monarch, Symposiachrus guttula
- Frilled monarch, Arses telescopthalmus
- Ochre-collared monarch, Arses insularis
- Magpie-lark, Grallina cyanoleuca
- Torrent-lark, Grallina bruijnii
- Biak flycatcher, Myiagra atra
- Moluccan flycatcher, Myiagra galeata
- Leaden flycatcher, Myiagra rubecula
- Broad-billed flycatcher, Myiagra ruficollis
- Satin flycatcher, Myiagra cyanoleuca
- Restless flycatcher, Myiagra inquieta (A)
- Paperbark flycatcher, Myiagra nana
- Shining flycatcher, Myiagra alecto
- Vanikoro flycatcher, Myiagra vanikorensis
- Azure-crested flycatcher, Myiagra azureocapilla
- Chestnut-throated flycatcher, Myiagra castaneigularis
- Ogea monarch, Mayrornis versicolor
- Slaty monarch, Mayrornis lessoni
- Fiji shrikebill, Clytorhynchus vitiensis
- Black-throated shrikebill, Clytorhynchus nigrogularis

== Melampittas ==
Order: Passeriformes Family: Melampittidae

They are little studied and before being established as a family in 2014 their taxonomic relationships with other birds were uncertain, being considered at one time related variously to the pittas, Old World babblers and birds-of-paradise.

- Lesser melampitta, Melampitta lugubris
- Greater melampitta, Melampitta gigantea

== Crested shrikejay ==
Order: Passeriformes Family: Platylophidae

Until 2018 this species was included in family Corvidae, but genetic and morphological evidence place it in its own family.

- Crested shrikejay, Platylophus galericulatus

== Shrikes ==
Order: Passeriformes Family: Laniidae

Shrikes are passerine birds known for the habit of some species of catching other birds and small animals and impaling the uneaten portions of their bodies on thorns. A shrike's beak is hooked, like that of a typical bird of prey.

- Tiger shrike, Lanius tigrinus
- Bull-headed shrike, Lanius bucephalus
- Red-backed shrike, Lanius collurio
- Red-tailed shrike, Lanius phoenicuroides
- Isabelline shrike, Lanius isabellinus
- Brown shrike, Lanius cristatus
- Burmese shrike, Lanius collurioides
- Bay-backed shrike, Lanius vittatus
- Long-tailed shrike, Lanius schach
- Gray-backed shrike, Lanius tephronotus
- Mountain shrike, Lanius validirostris
- Northern shrike, Lanius borealis
- Great gray shrike, Lanius excubitor
- Lesser gray shrike, Lanius minor
- Chinese gray shrike, Lanius sphenocercus
- Giant shrike, Lanius giganteus
- Masked shrike, Lanius nubicus
- Woodchat shrike, Lanius senator
- Iberian gray shrike, Lanius meridionalis

== Crows, jays, and magpies ==
Order: Passeriformes Family: Corvidae

The family Corvidae includes crows, ravens, jays, choughs, magpies, treepies, nutcrackers, and ground jays. Corvids are above average in size among the Passeriformes, and some of the larger species show high levels of intelligence.

- Black magpie, Platysmurus leucopterus
- Siberian jay, Perisoreus infaustus
- Sichuan jay, Perisoreus internigrans
- Eurasian jay, Garrulus glandarius
- Black-headed jay, Garrulus lanceolatus
- Lidth's jay, Garrulus lidthi
- Azure-winged magpie, Cyanopica cyanus
- Sri Lanka blue-magpie, Urocissa ornata
- Taiwan blue-magpie, Urocissa caerulea
- Yellow-billed blue-magpie, Urocissa flavirostris
- Red-billed blue-magpie, Urocissa erythrorhyncha
- White-winged magpie, Urocissa whiteheadi
- Common green-magpie, Cissa chinensis
- Indochinese green-magpie, Cissa hypoleuca
- Javan green-magpie, Cissa thalassina
- Bornean green-magpie, Cissa jefferyi
- Rufous treepie, Dendrocitta vagabunda
- Gray treepie, Dendrocitta formosae
- Sumatran treepie, Dendrocitta occipitalis
- Bornean treepie, Dendrocitta cinerascens
- White-bellied treepie, Dendrocitta leucogastra
- Collared treepie, Dendrocitta frontalis
- Andaman treepie, Dendrocitta bayleyii
- Racket-tailed treepie, Crypsirina temia
- Hooded treepie, Crypsirina cucullata
- Ratchet-tailed treepie, Temnurus temnurus
- Black-rumped magpie, Pica bottanensis
- Oriental magpie, Pica serica
- Eurasian magpie, Pica pica
- Asir magpie, Pica asirensis
- Mongolian ground-jay, Podoces hendersoni
- Xinjiang ground-jay, Podoces biddulphi
- Turkestan ground-jay, Podoces panderi
- Iranian ground-jay, Podoces pleskei
- Eurasian nutcracker, Nucifraga caryocatactes
- Kashmir nutcracker, Nucifraga multipunctata
- Red-billed chough, Pyrrhocorax pyrrhocorax
- Yellow-billed chough, Pyrrhocorax graculus
- Eurasian jackdaw, Corvus monedula
- Daurian jackdaw, Corvus dauuricus
- House crow, Corvus splendens
- Banggai crow, Corvus unicolor
- Slender-billed crow, Corvus enca
- Violet crow, Corvus violaceus
- Piping crow, Corvus typicus
- Flores crow, Corvus florensis
- Long-billed crow, Corvus validus
- Brown-headed crow, Corvus fuscicapillus
- Gray crow, Corvus tristis
- Rook, Corvus frugilegus
- Carrion crow, Corvus corone
- Hooded crow, Corvus cornix
- Large-billed crow, Corvus macrorhynchos
- Torresian crow, Corvus orru
- Collared crow, Corvus torquatus
- Pied crow, Corvus albus (A)
- Brown-necked raven, Corvus ruficollis
- Fan-tailed raven, Corvus rhipidurus
- Common raven, Corvus corax
- White-necked raven, Corvus albicollis
- Plush-crested jay, Cyanocorax chrysops

== Satinbirds ==
Order: Passeriformes Family: Cnemophilidae

They are a family of passerine birds which consists of four species found in the mountain forests of New Guinea. They were originally thought to be part of the birds-of-paradise family Paradisaeidae until genetic research suggested that the birds are not closely related to birds-of-paradise at all and are perhaps closer to berry peckers and longbills (Melanocharitidae). The current evidence suggests that their closest relatives may be the cuckoo-shrikes (Campephagidae).

- Loria's satinbird, Cnemophilus loriae
- Crested satinbird, Cnemophilus macgregorii
- Yellow-breasted satinbird, Loboparadisea sericea

== Berrypeckers and longbills ==
Order: Passeriformes Family: Melanocharitidae

The Melanocharitidae are medium-sized birds which feed on fruit and some insects and other invertebrates. They have drab plumage in greys, browns or black and white. The berrypeckers resemble stout short-billed honeyeaters, and the longbills are like drab sunbirds.

- Obscure berrypecker, Melanocharis arfakiana
- Black berrypecker, Melanocharis nigra
- Mid-mountain berrypecker, Melanocharis longicauda
- Fan-tailed berrypecker, Melanocharis versteri
- Satin berrypecker, Melanocharis citreola
- Streaked berrypecker, Melanocharis striativentris
- Spotted berrypecker, Melanocharis crassirostris
- Yellow-bellied longbill, Toxorhamphus novaeguineae
- Slaty-chinned longbill, Toxorhamphus poliopterus
- Spectacled longbill, Oedistoma iliolophus
- Pygmy longbill, Oedistoma pygmaeum

== Australasian robins ==
Order: Passeriformes Family: Petroicidae

Most species of Petroicidae have a stocky build with a large rounded head, a short straight bill and rounded wingtips. They occupy a wide range of wooded habitats, from subalpine to tropical rainforest, and mangrove swamp to semi-arid scrubland. All are primarily insectivores, although a few supplement their diet with seeds.

- Greater ground-robin, Amalocichla sclateriana
- Lesser ground-robin, Amalocichla incerta
- Torrent flycatcher, Monachella muelleriana
- Jacky-winter, Microeca fascinans
- Golden-bellied flyrobin, Microeca hemixantha
- Lemon-bellied flycatcher, Microeca flavigaster
- Yellow-legged flycatcher, Microeca griseoceps
- Olive flyrobin, Microeca flavovirescens
- Papuan flycatcher, Microeca papuana
- Garnet robin, Eugerygone rubra
- Subalpine robin, Petroica bivittata
- Snow Mountain robin, Petroica archboldi (E)
- Pacific robin, Petroica pusilla
- White-faced robin, Tregellasia leucops
- Mangrove robin, Eopsaltria pulverulenta
- Black-chinned robin, Poecilodryas brachyura
- Black-sided robin, Poecilodryas hypoleuca
- Olive-yellow robin, Poecilodryas placens
- Black-throated robin, Poecilodryas albonotata
- White-winged robin, Peneothello sigillata
- Smoky robin, Peneothello cryptoleuca (E)
- White-rumped robin, Peneothello bimaculata
- Blue-gray robin, Peneothello cyanus
- Ashy robin, Heteromyias albispecularis
- Green-backed robin, Pachycephalopsis hattamensis
- White-eyed robin, Pachycephalopsis poliosoma
- Papuan scrub-robin, Drymodes beccarii

== Rail-babbler ==
Order: Passeriformes Family: Eupetidae

The Malaysian rail-babbler is a rail-like passerine bird which inhabits the floor of primary forest in the Malay Peninsula and Sumatra. It is the only member of its family.

- Malaysian rail-babbler, Eupetes macrocerus

== Fairy flycatchers ==
Order: Passeriformes Family: Stenostiridae

Most of the species of this small family are found in Africa, though a few inhabit tropical Asia. They are not closely related to other birds called "flycatchers".

- Yellow-bellied fairy-fantail, Chelidorhynx hypoxanthus
- Gray-headed canary-flycatcher, Culicicapa ceylonensis
- Citrine canary-flycatcher, Culicicapa helianthea

== Tits, chickadees, and titmice ==
Order: Passeriformes Family: Paridae

The Paridae are mainly small stocky woodland species with short stout bills. Some have crests. They are adaptable birds, with a mixed diet including seeds and insects.

- Fire-capped tit, Cephalopyrus flammiceps
- Yellow-browed tit, Sylviparus modestus
- Sultan tit, Melanochlora sultanea
- Coal tit, Periparus ater
- Rufous-naped tit, Periparus rufonuchalis
- Rufous-vented tit, Periparus rubidiventris
- Yellow-bellied tit, Periparus venustulus
- Elegant tit, Periparus elegans
- Palawan tit, Periparus amabilis
- Crested tit, Lophophanes cristatus
- Gray-crested tit, Lophophanes dichrous
- Chestnut-bellied tit, Sittiparus castaneoventris
- Iriomote tit, Sittiparus olivaceus
- Varied tit, Sittiparus varius
- Owston's tit, Sittiparus owstoni
- White-fronted tit, Sittiparus semilarvatus
- White-browed tit, Poecile superciliosus
- Sombre tit, Poecile lugubris
- Pere David's tit, Poecile davidi
- Marsh tit, Poecile palustris
- Black-bibbed tit, Poecile hypermelaenus
- Willow tit, Poecile montanus
- Sichuan tit, Poecile weigoldicus
- Gray-headed chickadee, Poecile cinctus
- Caspian tit, Poecile hyrcanus
- Eurasian blue tit, Cyanistes caeruleus
- Azure tit, Cyanistes cyanus
- African blue tit, Cyanistes teneriffae
- Ground tit, Pseudopodoces humilis
- Green-backed tit, Parus monticolus
- Great tit, Parus major
- Cinereous tit, Parus cinereus
- Japanese tit, Parus minor
- White-naped tit, Machlolophus nuchalis
- Taiwan yellow tit, Machlolophus holsti
- Himalayan black-lored tit, Machlolophus xanthogenys
- Indian yellow tit, Machlolophus aplonotus
- Yellow-cheeked tit, Machlolophus spilonotus

== Penduline-tits ==
Order: Passeriformes Family: Remizidae

The penduline-tits are a group of small passerine birds related to the true tits. They are insectivores.

- Eurasian penduline-tit, Remiz pendulinus
- Black-headed penduline-tit, Remiz macronyx
- White-crowned penduline-tit, Remiz coronatus
- Chinese penduline-tit, Remiz consobrinus

== Larks ==
Order: Passeriformes Family: Alaudidae

Larks are small terrestrial birds with often extravagant songs and display flights. Most larks are fairly dull in appearance. Their food is insects and seeds.

- Greater hoopoe-lark, Alaemon alaudipes
- Thick-billed lark, Ramphocoris clotbey
- Bar-tailed lark, Ammomanes cinctura
- Rufous-tailed lark, Ammomanes phoenicura
- Desert lark, Ammomanes deserti
- Black-crowned sparrow-lark, Eremopterix nigriceps
- Ashy-crowned sparrow-lark, Eremopterix griseus
- Chestnut-headed sparrow-lark, Eremopterix signatus
- Horsfield's bushlark, Mirafra javanica
- Burmese bushlark, Mirafra microptera
- Bengal bushlark, Mirafra assamica
- Indochinese bushlark, Mirafra erythrocephala
- Jerdon's bushlark, Mirafra affinis
- Indian bushlark, Mirafra erythroptera
- Kordofan lark, Mirafra cordofanica
- Horned lark, Eremophila alpestris
- Temminck's lark, Eremophila bilopha
- Greater short-toed lark, Calandrella brachydactyla
- Mongolian short-toed lark, Calandrella dukhunensis
- Hume's short-toed lark, Calandrella acutirostris
- Rufous-capped lark, Calandrella eremica
- Red-capped lark, Calandrella cinerea
- Bimaculated lark, Melanocorypha bimaculata
- Calandra lark, Melanocorypha calandra
- Tibetan lark, Melanocorypha maxima
- Black lark, Melanocorypha yeltoniensis
- Mongolian lark, Melanocorypha mongolica
- Dunn's lark, Eremalauda dunni (A)
- Arabian lark, Eremalauda eremodites
- Asian short-toed lark, Alaudala cheleensis
- Mediterranean short-toed lark, Alaudala rufescens
- Turkestan short-toed lark, Alaudala heinei
- Sand lark, Alaudala raytal
- Wood lark, Lullula arborea
- White-winged lark, Alauda leucoptera
- Eurasian skylark, Alauda arvensis
- Oriental skylark, Alauda gulgula
- Razo skylark, Alauda razae
- Crested lark, Galerida cristata
- Malabar lark, Galerida malabarica
- Tawny lark, Galerida deva
- Thekla's lark, Galerida theklae
- Dupont's lark, Chersophilus duponti

== Bearded reedling ==
Order: Passeriformes Family: Panuridae

This species, the only one in its family, is found in reed beds throughout temperate Europe and Asia.

- Bearded reedling, Panurus biarmicus

== Cisticolas and allies ==
Order: Passeriformes Family: Cisticolidae

The Cisticolidae are warblers found mainly in warmer southern regions of the Old World. They are generally very small birds of drab brown or gray appearance found in open country such as grassland or scrub.

- Leyte plumed-warbler, Micromacronus leytensis
- Mindanao plumed-warbler, Micromacronus sordidus
- Common tailorbird, Orthotomus sutorius
- Rufous-fronted tailorbird, Orthotomus frontalis
- Dark-necked tailorbird, Orthotomus atrogularis
- Cambodian tailorbird, Orthotomus chaktomuk
- Ashy tailorbird, Orthotomus ruficeps
- Olive-backed tailorbird, Orthotomus sepium
- Rufous-tailed tailorbird, Orthotomus sericeus
- Visayan tailorbird, Orthotomus castaneiceps
- Gray-backed tailorbird, Orthotomus derbianus
- Green-backed tailorbird, Orthotomus chloronotus
- Yellow-breasted tailorbird, Orthotomus samarensis
- White-browed tailorbird, Orthotomus nigriceps
- White-eared tailorbird, Orthotomus cinereiceps
- Himalayan prinia, Prinia crinigera
- Striped prinia, Prinia striata
- Burmese prinia, Prinia cooki
- Annam prinia, Prinia rocki
- Brown prinia, Prinia polychroa
- Black-throated prinia, Prinia atrogularis
- Hill prinia, Prinia superciliaris
- Gray-crowned prinia, Prinia cinereocapilla
- Rufescent prinia, Prinia rufescens
- Gray-breasted prinia, Prinia hodgsonii
- Bar-winged prinia, Prinia familiaris
- Graceful prinia, Prinia gracilis
- Delicate prinia, Prinia lepida
- Jungle prinia, Prinia sylvatica
- Yellow-bellied prinia, Prinia flaviventris
- Ashy prinia, Prinia socialis
- Plain prinia, Prinia inornata
- Zitting cisticola, Cisticola juncidis
- Golden-headed cisticola, Cisticola exilis
- Socotra cisticola, Cisticola haesitatus
- Socotra warbler, Incana incana
- Cricket longtail, Spiloptila clamans

== Reed warblers and allies ==
Order: Passeriformes Family: Acrocephalidae

The members of this family are usually rather large for "warblers". Most are rather plain olivaceous brown above with much yellow to beige below. They are usually found in open woodland, reedbeds, or tall grass. The family occurs mostly in southern to western Eurasia and surroundings, but it also ranges far into the Pacific, with some species in Africa.

- Thick-billed warbler, Arundinax aedon
- Booted warbler, Iduna caligata
- Sykes's warbler, Iduna rama
- Eastern olivaceous warbler, Iduna pallida
- Western olivaceous warbler, Iduna opaca
- Upcher's warbler, Hippolais languida
- Olive-tree warbler, Hippolais olivetorum
- Icterine warbler, Hippolais icterina
- Aquatic warbler, Acrocephalus paludicola
- Black-browed reed warbler, Acrocephalus bistrigiceps
- Streaked reed warbler, Acrocephalus sorghophilus
- Moustached warbler, Acrocephalus melanopogon
- Sedge warbler, Acrocephalus schoenobaenus
- Paddyfield warbler, Acrocephalus agricola
- Blunt-winged warbler, Acrocephalus concinens
- Manchurian reed warbler, Acrocephalus tangorum
- Blyth's reed warbler, Acrocephalus dumetorum
- Large-billed reed warbler, Acrocephalus orinus
- Marsh warbler, Acrocephalus palustris
- Common reed warbler, Acrocephalus scirpaceus
- Basra reed warbler, Acrocephalus griseldis
- Great reed warbler, Acrocephalus arundinaceus
- Oriental reed warbler, Acrocephalus orientalis
- Clamorous reed warbler, Acrocephalus stentoreus
- Australian reed warbler, Acrocephalus australis
- Cape Verde swamp warbler, Acrocephalus brevipennis

== Grassbirds and allies ==
Order: Passeriformes Family: Locustellidae

Locustellidae are a family of small insectivorous songbirds found mainly in Eurasia, Africa, and the Australian region. They are smallish birds with tails that are usually long and pointed, and tend to be drab brownish or buffy all over.

- Cordillera ground-warbler, Robsonius rabori
- Sierra Madre ground-warbler, Robsonius thompsoni
- Bicol ground-warbler, Robsonius sorsogonensis
- Fly River grassbird, Poodytes albolimbatus
- Little grassbird, Poodytes gramineus
- Malia, Malia grata
- Buff-banded bushbird, Cincloramphus bivittatus
- Tawny grassbird, Cincloramphus timoriensis
- Papuan grassbird, Cincloramphus macrurus
- Striated grassbird, Megalurus palustris
- Broad-tailed grassbird, Schoenicola platyurus
- Gray's grasshopper warbler, Helopsaltes fasciolatus
- Sakhalin grasshopper warbler, Helopsaltes amnicola
- Marsh grassbird, Helopsaltes pryeri
- Pallas's grasshopper warbler, Helopsaltes certhiola
- Middendorff's grasshopper warbler, Helopsaltes ochotensis
- Pleske's grasshopper warbler, Helopsaltes pleskei
- Lanceolated warbler, Locustella lanceolata
- River warbler, Locustella fluviatilis
- Savi's warbler, Locustella luscinioides
- Brown bush warbler, Locustella luteoventris
- Chinese bush warbler, Locustella tacsanowskia
- Long-billed bush warbler, Locustella major
- Common grasshopper-warbler, Locustella naevia
- Long-tailed bush warbler, Locustella caudata
- Sulawesi bush warbler, Locustella castanea
- Seram bush warbler, Locustella musculus
- Taliabu bush warbler, Locustella portenta
- Buru bush warbler, Locustella disturbans
- Baikal bush warbler, Locustella davidi
- West Himalayan bush warbler, Locustella kashmirensis
- Spotted bush warbler, Locustella thoracica
- Taiwan bush warbler, Locustella alishanensis
- Friendly bush warbler, Locustella accentor
- Russet bush warbler, Locustella mandelli
- Dalat bush warbler, Locustella idonea
- Sichuan bush warbler, Locustella chengi
- Benguet bush warbler, Locustella seebohmi
- Javan bush warbler, Locustella montis
- Sri Lanka bush warbler, Elaphrornis palliseri
- Bristled grassbird, Schoenicola striatus
- Long-legged thicketbird, Trichocichla rufa

== Cupwings ==
Order: Passeriformes Family: Pnoepygidae

The members of this small family are found in mountainous parts of South and South East Asia.

- Scaly-breasted cupwing, Pnoepyga albiventer
- Taiwan cupwing, Pnoepyga formosana
- Immaculate cupwing, Pnoepyga immaculata
- Pygmy cupwing, Pnoepyga pusilla

== Swallows ==
Order: Passeriformes Family: Hirundinidae

The family Hirundinidae is adapted to aerial feeding. They have a slender streamlined body, long pointed wings, and a short bill with a wide gape. The feet are adapted to perching rather than walking, and the front toes are partially joined at the base.

- White-eyed river martin, Pseudochelidon sirintarae
- Purple martin, Progne subis (A)
- Tree swallow, Tachycineta bicolor
- Plain martin, Riparia paludicola
- Gray-throated martin, Riparia chinensis
- Bank swallow, Riparia riparia
- Pale sand martin, Riparia diluta
- Banded martin, Neophedina cincta
- Eurasian crag-martin, Ptyonoprogne rupestris
- Rock martin, Ptyonoprogne fuligula
- Dusky crag-martin, Ptyonoprogne concolor
- Barn swallow, Hirundo rustica
- Wire-tailed swallow, Hirundo smithii
- Welcome swallow, Hirundo neoxena
- Hill swallow, Hirundo domicola
- Pacific swallow, Hirundo tahitica
- Ethiopian swallow, Hirundo aethiopica
- Red-rumped swallow, Cecropis daurica
- Sri Lanka swallow, Cecropis hyperythra
- Striated swallow, Cecropis striolata
- Rufous-bellied swallow, Cecropis badia
- Lesser striped swallow, Cecropis abyssinica
- Streak-throated swallow, Petrochelidon fluvicola
- Fairy martin, Petrochelidon ariel
- Tree martin, Petrochelidon nigricans
- Cliff swallow, Petrochelidon pyrrhonota
- Red Sea cliff swallow, Petrochelidon perdita
- Preuss's swallow, Petrochelidon preussi
- Common house-martin, Delichon urbicum
- Asian house-martin, Delichon dasypus
- Nepal house-martin, Delichon nipalense
- Northern rough-winged swallow, Stelgidopteryx serripennis

== Bulbuls ==
Order: Passeriformes Family: Pycnonotidae

Bulbuls are medium-sized songbirds. Some are colourful with yellow, red, or orange vents, cheeks, throats, or supercilia, but most are drab, with uniform olive-brown to black plumage. Some species have distinct crests.

- Black-and-white bulbul, Brachypodius melanoleucos
- Puff-backed bulbul, Brachypodius eutilotus
- Yellow-wattled bulbul, Brachypodius urostictus
- Gray-headed bulbul, Brachypodius priocephalus
- Black-headed bulbul, Brachypodius melanocephalos
- Andaman bulbul, Brachypodius fuscoflavescens
- Spectacled bulbul, Rubigula erythropthalmos
- Gray-bellied bulbul, Rubigula cyaniventris
- Scaly-breasted bulbul, Rubigula squamatus
- Black-crested bulbul, Rubigula flaviventris
- Flame-throated bulbul, Rubigula gularis
- Black-capped bulbul, Rubigula melanictera
- Ruby-throated bulbul, Rubigula dispar
- Bornean bulbul, Rubigula montis
- Bare-faced bulbul, Nok hualon
- Crested finchbill, Spizixos canifrons
- Collared finchbill, Spizixos semitorques
- Straw-headed bulbul, Pycnonotus zeylanicus
- Striated bulbul, Pycnonotus striatus
- Cream-striped bulbul, Pycnonotus leucogrammicus
- Spot-necked bulbul, Pycnonotus tympanistrigus
- Styan's bulbul, Pycnonotus taivanus
- Red-vented bulbul, Pycnonotus cafer
- Red-whiskered bulbul, Pycnonotus jocosus
- Brown-breasted bulbul, Pycnonotus xanthorrhous
- Light-vented bulbul, Pycnonotus sinensis
- Common bulbul, Pycnonotus barbatus
- White-spectacled bulbul, Pycnonotus xanthopygos
- White-eared bulbul, Pycnonotus leucotis
- Himalayan bulbul, Pycnonotus leucogenys
- Sooty-headed bulbul, Pycnonotus aurigaster
- Blue-wattled bulbul, Pycnonotus nieuwenhuisii
- Aceh bulbul, Pycnonotus snouckaerti
- Orange-spotted bulbul, Pycnonotus bimaculatus
- Stripe-throated bulbul, Pycnonotus finlaysoni
- Yellow-throated bulbul, Pycnonotus xantholaemus
- Yellow-eared bulbul, Pycnonotus penicillatus
- Flavescent bulbul, Pycnonotus flavescens
- White-browed bulbul, Pycnonotus luteolus
- Yellow-vented bulbul, Pycnonotus goiavier
- Olive-winged bulbul, Pycnonotus plumosus
- Ashy-fronted bulbul, Pycnonotus cinereifrons
- Cream-eyed bulbul, Pycnonotus pseudosimplex
- Ayeyarwady bulbul, Pycnonotus blanfordi
- Streak-eared bulbul, Pycnonotus conradi
- Cream-vented bulbul, Pycnonotus simplex
- Red-eyed bulbul, Pycnonotus brunneus
- Hairy-backed bulbul, Tricholestes criniger
- Hook-billed bulbul, Setornis criniger
- Finsch's bulbul, Alophoixus finschii
- White-throated bulbul, Alophoixus flaveolus
- Puff-throated bulbul, Alophoixus pallidus
- Ochraceous bulbul, Alophoixus ochraceus
- Penan bulbul, Alophoixus ruficrissus
- Gray-cheeked bulbul, Alophoixus tephrogenys
- Brown-cheeked bulbul, Alophoixus bres
- Gray-throated bulbul, Alophoixus frater
- Yellow-bellied bulbul, Alophoixus phaeocephalus
- Sangihe golden-bulbul, Alophoixus platenae
- Togian golden-bulbul, Alophoixus aureus
- Sula golden-bulbul, Alophoixus longirostris
- Halmahera golden-bulbul, Alophoixus chloris
- Obi golden-bulbul, Alophoixus lucasi
- Buru golden-bulbul, Alophoixus mystacalis
- Seram golden-bulbul, Alophoixus affinis
- Sulphur-bellied bulbul, Ixos palawanensis
- Buff-vented bulbul, Iole crypta
- Charlotte's bulbul, Iole charlottae
- Gray-eyed bulbul, Iole propinqua
- Cachar bulbul, Iole cacharensis
- Olive bulbul, Iole virescens
- Yellow-browed bulbul, Iole indica
- Mauritius bulbul, Hypsipetes olivaceus (Ex)
- Black bulbul, Hypsipetes leucocephalus
- Square-tailed bulbul, Hypsipetes ganeesa
- Nicobar bulbul, Hypsipetes nicobariensis
- White-headed bulbul, Hypsipetes thompsoni
- Brown-eared bulbul, Hypsipetes amaurotis
- Visayan bulbul, Hypsipetes guimarasensis
- Zamboanga bulbul, Hypsipetes rufigularis
- Yellowish bulbul, Hypsipetes everetti
- Mindoro bulbul, Hypsipetes mindorensis
- Streak-breasted bulbul, Hypsipetes siquijorensis
- Philippine bulbul, Hypsipetes philippinus
- Ashy bulbul, Hemixos flavala
- Cinereous bulbul, Hemixos cinereus
- Chestnut bulbul, Hemixos castanonotus
- Mountain bulbul, Ixos mcclellandii
- Sunda bulbul, Ixos virescens
- Streaked bulbul, Ixos malaccensis

== Leaf warblers ==
Order: Passeriformes Family: Phylloscopidae

Leaf warblers are a family of small insectivorous birds found mostly in Eurasia and ranging into Wallacea and Africa. The species are of various sizes, often green-plumaged above and yellow below, or more subdued with greyish-green to greyish-brown colours.

- Wood warbler, Phylloscopus sibilatrix
- Eastern Bonelli's warbler, Phylloscopus orientalis
- Ashy-throated warbler, Phylloscopus maculipennis
- Buff-barred warbler, Phylloscopus pulcher
- Yellow-browed warbler, Phylloscopus inornatus
- Hume's warbler, Phylloscopus humei
- Brooks's leaf warbler, Phylloscopus subviridis
- Chinese leaf warbler, Phylloscopus yunnanensis
- Pallas's leaf warbler, Phylloscopus proregulus
- Gansu leaf warbler, Phylloscopus kansuensis
- Lemon-rumped warbler, Phylloscopus chloronotus
- Sichuan leaf warbler, Phylloscopus forresti
- Tytler's leaf warbler, Phylloscopus tytleri
- Radde's warbler, Phylloscopus schwarzi
- Yellow-streaked warbler, Phylloscopus armandii
- Sulphur-bellied warbler, Phylloscopus griseolus
- Tickell's leaf warbler, Phylloscopus affinis
- Dusky warbler, Phylloscopus fuscatus
- Smoky warbler, Phylloscopus fuligiventer
- Plain leaf warbler, Phylloscopus neglectus
- Buff-throated warbler, Phylloscopus subaffinis
- Willow warbler, Phylloscopus trochilus
- Mountain chiffchaff, Phylloscopus sindianus
- Common chiffchaff, Phylloscopus collybita
- Iberian chiffchaff, Phylloscopus ibericus (A)
- Lemon-throated leaf warbler, Phylloscopus cebuensis
- Philippine leaf warbler, Phylloscopus olivaceus
- Eastern crowned leaf warbler, Phylloscopus coronatus
- Ijima's leaf warbler, Phylloscopus ijimae
- Brown woodland-warbler, Phylloscopus umbrovirens
- White-spectacled warbler, Phylloscopus affinis
- Gray-cheeked warbler, Phylloscopus poliogenys
- Green-crowned warbler, Phylloscopus burkii
- Gray-crowned warbler, Phylloscopus tephrocephalus
- Whistler's warbler, Phylloscopus whistleri
- Bianchi's warbler, Phylloscopus valentini
- Martens's warbler, Phylloscopus omeiensis
- Alström's warbler, Phylloscopus soror
- Green warbler, Phylloscopus nitidus
- Greenish warbler, Phylloscopus trochiloides
- Two-barred warbler, Phylloscopus plumbeitarsus
- Emei leaf warbler, Phylloscopus emeiensis
- Large-billed leaf warbler, Phylloscopus magnirostris
- Pale-legged leaf warbler, Phylloscopus tenellipes
- Sakhalin leaf warbler, Phylloscopus borealoides
- Japanese leaf warbler, Phylloscopus xanthodryas
- Arctic warbler, Phylloscopus borealis
- Kamchatka leaf warbler, Phylloscopus examinandus
- Chestnut-crowned warbler, Phylloscopus castaniceps
- Yellow-breasted warbler, Phylloscopus montis
- Sunda warbler, Phylloscopus grammiceps
- Limestone leaf warbler, Phylloscopus calciatilis
- Yellow-vented warbler, Phylloscopus cantator
- Sulphur-breasted warbler, Phylloscopus ricketti
- Western crowned warbler, Phylloscopus occipitalis
- Blyth's leaf warbler, Phylloscopus reguloides
- Claudia's leaf warbler, Phylloscopus claudiae
- Hartert's leaf warbler, Phylloscopus goodsoni
- Gray-hooded warbler, Phylloscopus xanthoschistos
- Davison's leaf warbler, Phylloscopus intensior
- Hainan leaf warbler, Phylloscopus hainanus
- Kloss's leaf warbler, Phylloscopus ogilviegranti
- Mountain leaf warbler, Phylloscopus trivirgatus
- Negros leaf warbler, Phylloscopus nigrorum
- Timor leaf warbler, Phylloscopus presbytes
- Rote leaf warbler, Phylloscopus rotiensis
- Sulawesi leaf warbler, Phylloscopus nesophilus
- Lompobattang leaf warbler, Phylloscopus sarasinorum
- Numfor leaf warbler, Phylloscopus maforensis
- Island leaf warbler, Phylloscopus poliocephalus
- Biak leaf warbler, Phylloscopus misoriensis
- Canary Islands chiffchaff, Phylloscopus canariensis

== Bush warblers and allies ==
Order: Passeriformes Family: Scotocercidae

The members of this family are found throughout Africa, Asia, and Polynesia. Their taxonomy is in flux, and some authorities place some genera in other families.

- Scrub warbler, Scotocerca inquieta
- Pale-footed bush warbler, Urosphena pallidipes
- Timor stubtail, Urosphena subulata
- Bornean stubtail, Urosphena whiteheadi
- Asian stubtail, Urosphena squameiceps
- Gray-bellied tesia, Tesia cyaniventer
- Slaty-bellied tesia, Tesia olivea
- Javan tesia, Tesia superciliaris
- Russet-capped tesia, Tesia everetti
- Chestnut-crowned bush warbler, Cettia major
- Gray-sided bush warbler, Cettia brunnifrons
- Chestnut-headed tesia, Cettia castaneocoronata
- Cetti's warbler, Cettia cetti
- Yellow-bellied warbler, Abroscopus superciliaris
- Rufous-faced warbler, Abroscopus albogularis
- Black-faced warbler, Abroscopus schisticeps
- Mountain tailorbird, Phyllergates cucullatus
- Rufous-headed tailorbird, Phyllergates heterolaemus
- Broad-billed warbler, Tickellia hodgsoni
- Philippine bush warbler, Horornis seebohmi
- Japanese bush warbler, Horornis diphone
- Manchurian bush warbler, Horornis borealis (A)
- Tanimbar bush warbler, Horornis carolinae
- Brownish-flanked bush warbler, Horornis fortipes
- Hume's bush warbler, Horornis brunnescens
- Yellowish-bellied bush warbler, Horornis acanthizoides
- Aberrant bush warbler, Horornis flavolivaceus
- Fiji bush warbler, Horornis ruficapilla

== Long-tailed tits ==
Order: Passeriformes Family: Aegithalidae

Long-tailed tits are a group of small passerine birds with medium to long tails. They make woven bag nests in trees. Most eat a mixed diet which includes insects.

- White-browed tit-warbler, Leptopoecile sophiae
- Crested tit-warbler, Leptopoecile elegans
- Long-tailed tit, Aegithalos caudatus
- Silver-throated tit, Aegithalos glaucogularis
- White-cheeked tit, Aegithalos leucogenys
- Black-throated tit, Aegithalos concinnus
- White-throated tit, Aegithalos niveogularis
- Black-browed tit, Aegithalos iouschistos
- Sooty tit, Aegithalos fuliginosus
- Pygmy tit, Psaltria exilis

== Sylviid warblers, parrotbills, and allies ==
Order: Passeriformes Family: Sylviidae

The family Sylviidae is a group of small insectivorous passerine birds. They mainly occur as breeding species, as the common name implies, in Europe, Asia and, to a lesser extent, Africa. Most are of generally undistinguished appearance, but many have distinctive songs.

- Eurasian blackcap, Sylvia atricapilla
- Garden warbler, Sylvia borin
- Asian desert warbler, Curruca nana
- Barred warbler, Curruca nisoria
- Lesser whitethroat, Curruca curruca
- Yemen warbler, Curruca buryi
- Arabian warbler, Curruca leucomelaena
- Eastern Orphean warbler, Curruca crassirostris
- Cyprus warbler, Curruca melanothorax
- Menetries's warbler, Curruca mystacea
- Rüppell's warbler, Curruca ruppeli
- Eastern subalpine warbler, Curruca cantillans
- Sardinian warbler, Curruca melanocephala
- Greater whitethroat, Curruca communis
- Western Orphean warbler, Curruca hortensis
- Tristram's warbler, Curruca deserticola
- Spectacled warbler, Curruca conspicillata
- Marmora's warbler, Curruca sarda
- Dartford warbler, Curruca undata
- Moltoni's warbler, Curruca subalpina
- Balearic warbler, Curruca balearica
- Fire-tailed myzornis, Myzornis pyrrhoura
- Golden-breasted fulvetta, Lioparus chrysotis
- Yellow-eyed babbler, Chrysomma sinense
- Jerdon's babbler, Chrysomma altirostre
- Rufous-tailed babbler, Moupinia poecilotis
- Spectacled fulvetta, Fulvetta ruficapilla
- Indochinese fulvetta, Fulvetta danisi
- Chinese fulvetta, Fulvetta striaticollis
- Brown-throated fulvetta, Fulvetta ludlowi
- White-browed fulvetta, Fulvetta vinipectus
- Taiwan fulvetta, Fulvetta formosana
- Gray-hooded fulvetta, Fulvetta cinereiceps
- Streak-throated fulvetta, Fulvetta manipurensis
- Tarim babbler, Rhopophilus albosuperciliaris
- Beijing babbler, Rhopophilus pekinensis
- Great parrotbill, Conostoma aemodium
- Brown parrotbill, Cholornis unicolor
- Three-toed parrotbill, Cholornis paradoxus
- Gray-headed parrotbill, Psittiparus gularis
- Black-headed parrotbill, Psittiparus margaritae
- White-breasted parrotbill, Psittiparus ruficeps
- Rufous-headed parrotbill, Psittiparus bakeri
- Black-breasted parrotbill, Paradoxornis flavirostris
- Spot-breasted parrotbill, Paradoxornis guttaticollis
- Reed parrotbill, Calamornis heudei
- Pale-billed parrotbill, Chleuasicus atrosuperciliaris
- Spectacled parrotbill, Sinosuthora conspicillata
- Vinous-throated parrotbill, Sinosuthora webbiana
- Brown-winged parrotbill, Sinosuthora brunnea
- Ashy-throated parrotbill, Sinosuthora alphonsiana
- Gray-hooded parrotbill, Sinosuthora zappeyi
- Rusty-throated parrotbill, Sinosuthora przewalskii
- Fulvous parrotbill, Suthora fulvifrons
- Black-throated parrotbill, Suthora nipalensis
- Golden parrotbill, Suthora verreauxi
- Short-tailed parrotbill, Neosuthora davidiana

== White-eyes, yuhinas, and allies ==
Order: Passeriformes Family: Zosteropidae

The white-eyes are small birds of rather drab appearance, the plumage above being typically greenish-olive, but some species have a white or bright yellow throat, breast, or lower parts, and several have buff flanks. As the name suggests, many species have a white ring around each eyes.

- White-collared yuhina, Parayuhina diademata
- Striated yuhina, Staphida castaniceps
- Indochinese yuhina, Staphida torqueola
- Chestnut-crested yuhina, Staphida everetti
- White-naped yuhina, Yuhina bakeri
- Whiskered yuhina, Yuhina flavicollis
- Burmese yuhina, Yuhina humilis
- Stripe-throated yuhina, Yuhina gularis
- Rufous-vented yuhina, Yuhina occipitalis
- Taiwan yuhina, Yuhina brunneiceps
- Black-chinned yuhina, Yuhina nigrimenta
- Chestnut-faced babbler, Zosterornis whiteheadi
- Luzon striped-babbler, Zosterornis striatus
- Panay striped-babbler, Zosterornis latistriatus
- Negros striped-babbler, Zosterornis nigrorum
- Palawan striped-babbler, Zosterornis hypogrammicus
- Javan gray-throated white-eye, Heleia javanica
- Streak-headed white-eye, Heleia squamiceps
- Gray-hooded white-eye, Heleia pinaiae
- Mindanao white-eye, Heleia goodfellowi
- White-browed white-eye, Heleia superciliaris
- Dark-crowned white-eye, Heleia dohertyi
- Pygmy white-eye, Heleia squamifrons
- Flores white-eye, Heleia crassirostris
- Timor white-eye, Heleia muelleri
- Yellow-spectacled white-eye, Heleia wallacei
- Bonin white-eye, Apalopteron familiare
- Rufescent white-eye, Tephrozosterops stalkeri
- Golden-crowned babbler, Sterrhoptilus dennistouni
- Black-crowned babbler, Sterrhoptilus nigrocapitatus
- Rusty-crowned babbler, Sterrhoptilus capitalis
- Flame-templed babbler, Dasycrotapha speciosa
- Visayan pygmy-babbler, Dasycrotapha pygmaea
- Mindanao pygmy-babbler, Dasycrotapha plateni
- Abyssinian white-eye, Zosterops abyssinicus
- Socotra white-eye, Zosterops socotranus
- Sri Lanka white-eye, Zosterops ceylonensis
- Chestnut-flanked white-eye, Zosterops erythropleurus
- Indian white-eye, Zosterops palpebrosus
- Hume's white-eye, Zosterops auriventer
- Sangkar white-eye, Zosterops melanurus
- Warbling white-eye, Zosterops japonicus
- Swinhoe's white-eye, Zosterops simplex
- Lowland white-eye, Zosterops meyeni
- Black-capped white-eye, Zosterops atricapilla
- Everett's white-eye, Zosterops everetti
- Yellowish white-eye, Zosterops nigrorum
- Javan white-eye, Zosterops flavus
- Lemon-bellied white-eye, Zosterops chloris
- Meratus white-eye, Zosterops meratusensis
- Wakatobi white-eye, Zosterops flavissimus
- Ashy-bellied white-eye, Zosterops citrinella
- Great Kai white-eye, Zosterops grayi
- Little Kai white-eye, Zosterops uropygialis
- Sulawesi white-eye, Zosterops consobrinorum
- Black-ringed white-eye, Zosterops anomalus
- Black-crowned white-eye, Zosterops atrifrons
- Togian white-eye, Zosterops somadikartai
- Sangihe white-eye, Zosterops nehrkorni
- Seram white-eye, Zosterops stalkeri
- Cream-throated white-eye, Zosterops atriceps
- Black-fronted white-eye, Zosterops minor
- Tagula white-eye, Zosterops meeki
- Biak white-eye, Zosterops mysorensis
- Capped white-eye, Zosterops fuscicapilla
- Buru white-eye, Zosterops buruensis
- Ambon white-eye, Zosterops kuehni
- New Guinea white-eye, Zosterops novaeguineae
- Louisiade white-eye, Zosterops griseotinctus
- Layard's white-eye, Zosterops explorator
- Silver eye, Zosterops lateralis
- Yellow-fronted white-eye, Zosterops flavifrons
- Mountain black-eye, Zosterops emiliae

== Tree-babblers, scimitar-babblers, and allies ==
Order: Passeriformes Family: Timaliidae

The members of this family are somewhat diverse in size and colouration, but are characterised by soft fluffy plumage.

- Chestnut-capped babbler, Timalia pileata
- Pin-striped tit-babbler, Mixornis gularis
- Bold-striped tit-babbler, Mixornis bornensis
- Gray-cheeked tit-babbler, Mixornis flavicollis
- Kangean tit-babbler, Mixornis prillwitzi
- Gray-faced tit-babbler, Mixornis kelleyi
- Tawny-bellied babbler, Dumetia hyperythra
- Dark-fronted babbler, Dumetia atriceps
- Brown tit-babbler, Macronus striaticeps
- Fluffy-backed tit-babbler, Macronus ptilosus
- Golden babbler, Cyanoderma chrysaeum
- Chestnut-winged babbler, Cyanoderma erythropterum
- Gray-hooded babbler, Cyanoderma bicolor
- Crescent-chested babbler, Cyanoderma melanothorax
- Black-chinned babbler, Cyanoderma pyrrhops
- Rufous-capped babbler, Cyanoderma ruficeps
- Buff-chested babbler, Cyanoderma ambiguum
- Rufous-fronted babbler, Cyanoderma rufifrons
- Rufous-throated wren-babbler, Spelaeornis caudatus
- Mishmi wren-babbler, Spelaeornis badeigularis
- Bar-winged wren-babbler, Spelaeornis troglodytoides
- Naga wren-babbler, Spelaeornis chocolatinus
- Chin Hills wren-babbler, Spelaeornis oatesi
- Gray-bellied wren-babbler, Spelaeornis reptatus
- Pale-throated wren-babbler, Spelaeornis kinneari
- Tawny-breasted wren-babbler, Spelaeornis longicaudatus
- Red-billed scimitar-babbler, Pomatorhinus ochraceiceps
- Coral-billed scimitar-babbler, Pomatorhinus ferruginosus
- Sunda scimitar-babbler, Pomatorhinus bornensis
- Javan scimitar-babbler, Pomatorhinus montanus
- Slender-billed scimitar-babbler, Pomatorhinus superciliaris
- Streak-breasted scimitar-babbler, Pomatorhinus ruficollis
- Taiwan scimitar-babbler, Pomatorhinus musicus
- Indian scimitar-babbler, Pomatorhinus horsfieldii
- Sri Lanka scimitar-babbler, Pomatorhinus melanurus
- White-browed scimitar-babbler, Pomatorhinus schisticeps
- Large scimitar-babbler, Erythrogenys hypoleucos
- Black-necklaced scimitar-babbler, Erythrogenys erythrocnemis
- Rusty-cheeked scimitar-babbler, Erythrogenys erythrogenys
- Spot-breasted scimitar-babbler, Erythrogenys mcclellandi
- Black-streaked scimitar-babbler, Erythrogenys gravivox
- Gray-sided scimitar-babbler, Erythrogenys swinhoei
- White-breasted babbler, Stachyris grammiceps
- Black-throated babbler, Stachyris nigricollis
- Chestnut-rumped babbler, Stachyris maculata
- Gray-throated babbler, Stachyris nigriceps
- Gray-headed babbler, Stachyris poliocephala
- White-necked babbler, Stachyris leucotis
- White-bibbed babbler, Stachyris thoracica
- Snowy-throated babbler, Stachyris oglei
- Spot-necked babbler, Stachyris strialata
- Sooty babbler, Stachyris herberti
- Nonggang babbler, Stachyris nonggangensis
- Sikkim wedge-billed babbler, Stachyris humei
- Cachar wedge-billed babbler, Stachyris roberti

== Ground babblers and allies ==
Order: Passeriformes Family: Pellorneidae

These small to medium-sized songbirds have soft fluffy plumage but are otherwise rather diverse. Members of the genus Illadopsis are found in forests, but some other genera are birds of scrublands.

- Palawan babbler, Malacopteron palawanense
- Moustached babbler, Malacopteron magnirostre
- Sooty-capped babbler, Malacopteron affine
- Scaly-crowned babbler, Malacopteron cinereum
- Rufous-crowned babbler, Malacopteron magnum
- Gray-breasted babbler, Malacopteron albogulare
- White-hooded babbler, Gampsorhynchus rufulus
- Collared babbler, Gampsorhynchus torquatus
- Gold-fronted fulvetta, Schoeniparus variegaticeps
- Yellow-throated fulvetta, Schoeniparus cinereus
- Rufous-winged fulvetta, Schoeniparus castaneceps
- Black-crowned fulvetta, Schoeniparus klossi
- Rufous-throated fulvetta, Schoeniparus rufogularis
- Dusky fulvetta, Schoeniparus brunneus
- Rusty-capped fulvetta, Schoeniparus dubius
- Rufous-vented grass babbler, Laticilla burnesii
- Swamp grass babbler, Laticilla cinerascens
- Puff-throated babbler, Pellorneum ruficeps
- Black-capped babbler, Pellorneum capistratum
- Brown-capped babbler, Pellorneum fuscocapillus
- Marsh babbler, Pellorneum palustre
- Spot-throated babbler, Pellorneum albiventre
- Buff-breasted babbler, Pellorneum tickelli
- Sumatran babbler, Pellorneum buettikoferi
- Temminck's babbler, Pellorneum pyrrogenys
- Short-tailed babbler, Pellorneum malaccense
- Ashy-headed babbler, Pellorneum cinereiceps
- White-chested babbler, Pellorneum rostratum
- Sulawesi babbler, Pellorneum celebense
- Ferruginous babbler, Pellorneum bicolor
- Striped wren-babbler, Kenopia striata
- Eyebrowed wren-babbler, Napothera epilepidota
- Short-tailed scimitar-babbler, Napothera danjoui
- Naung Mung scimitar-babbler, Napothera naungmungensis
- Long-billed wren-babbler, Napothera malacoptila
- White-throated wren-babbler, Napothera pasquieri
- Sumatran wren-babbler, Napothera albostriata
- Bornean wren-babbler, Ptilocichla leucogrammica
- Striated wren-babbler, Ptilocichla mindanensis
- Falcated wren-babbler, Ptilocichla falcata
- Abbott's babbler, Malacocincla abbotti
- Horsfield's babbler, Malacocincla sepiaria
- Black-browed babbler, Malacocincla perspicillata
- Large wren-babbler, Turdinus macrodactylus
- Black-throated wren-babbler, Turdinus atrigularis
- Marbled wren-babbler, Turdinus marmoratus
- Rusty-breasted wren-babbler, Gypsophila rufipectus
- Annam limestone babbler, Gypsophila annamensis
- Rufous limestone babbler, Gypsophila calcicola
- Variable limestone babbler, Gypsophila crispifrons
- Streaked wren-babbler, Gypsophila brevicaudata
- Mountain wren-babbler, Gypsophila crassa
- Indian grassbird, Graminicola bengalensis
- Chinese grassbird, Graminicola striatus

== Laughingthrushes and allies ==
Order: Passeriformes Family: Leiothrichidae

The members of this family are diverse in size and colouration, though those of genus Turdoides tend to be brown or greyish. The family is found in Africa, India, and southeast Asia.

- Brown fulvetta, Alcippe brunneicauda
- Brown-cheeked fulvetta, Alcippe poioicephala
- Morrison's fulvetta, Alcippe morrisonia
- Yunnan fulvetta, Alcippe fratercula
- David's fulvetta, Alcippe davidi
- Huet's fulvetta, Alcippe hueti
- Javan fulvetta, Alcippe pyrrhoptera
- Mountain fulvetta, Alcippe peracensis
- Nepal fulvetta, Alcippe nipalensis
- Black-browed fulvetta, Alcippe grotei
- Striated laughingthrush, Grammatoptila striata
- Himalayan cutia, Cutia nipalensis
- Vietnamese cutia, Cutia legalleni
- Spiny babbler, Turdoides nipalensis
- Iraq babbler, Argya altirostris
- Afghan babbler, Argya huttoni
- Common babbler, Argya caudata
- Striated babbler, Argya earlei
- White-throated babbler, Argya gularis
- Slender-billed babbler, Argya longirostris
- Large gray babbler, Argya malcolmi
- Ashy-headed laughingthrush, Argya cinereifrons
- Arabian babbler, Argya squamiceps
- Rufous babbler, Argya subrufa
- Jungle babbler, Argya striata
- Orange-billed babbler, Argya rufescens
- Yellow-billed babbler, Argya affinis
- Fulvous chatterer, Argya fulva
- Sunda laughingthrush, Garrulax palliatus
- Rufous-fronted laughingthrush, Garrulax rufifrons
- Masked laughingthrush, Garrulax perspicillatus
- White-crested laughingthrush, Garrulax leucolophus
- Sumatran laughingthrush, Garrulax bicolor
- Lesser necklaced laughingthrush, Garrulax monileger
- Cambodian laughingthrush, Garrulax ferrarius
- White-necked laughingthrush, Garrulax strepitans
- Black-hooded laughingthrush, Garrulax milleti
- Gray laughingthrush, Garrulax maesi
- Rufous-cheeked laughingthrush, Garrulax castanotis
- Spot-breasted laughingthrush, Garrulax merulinus
- Orange-breasted laughingthrush, Garrulax annamensis
- Chinese hwamei, Garrulax canorus
- Taiwan hwamei, Garrulax taewanus
- Red-tailed laughingthrush, Garrulax milnei
- Black laughingthrush, Melanocichla lugubris
- Bare-headed laughingthrush, Melanocichla calvus
- Snowy-cheeked laughingthrush, Ianthocincla sukatschewi
- Moustached laughingthrush, Ianthocincla cineracea
- Rufous-chinned laughingthrush, Ianthocincla rufogularis
- Chestnut-eared laughingthrush, Ianthocincla konkakinhensis
- Spotted laughingthrush, Ianthocincla ocellata
- Barred laughingthrush, Ianthocincla lunulata
- Biet's laughingthrush, Ianthocincla bieti
- Giant laughingthrush, Ianthocincla maxima
- Greater necklaced laughingthrush, Pterorhinus pectoralis
- White-throated laughingthrush, Pterorhinus albogularis
- Rufous-crowned laughingthrush, Pterorhinus ruficeps
- Rufous-necked laughingthrush, Pterorhinus ruficollis
- Chestnut-backed laughingthrush, Pterorhinus nuchalis
- Black-throated laughingthrush, Pterorhinus chinensis
- White-cheeked laughingthrush, Pterorhinus vassali
- Yellow-throated laughingthrush, Pterorhinus galbanus
- Blue-crowned laughingthrush, Pterorhinus courtoisi
- Wynaad laughingthrush, Pterorhinus delesserti
- Rufous-vented laughingthrush, Pterorhinus gularis
- Pere David's laughingthrush, Pterorhinus davidi
- Gray-sided laughingthrush, Pterorhinus caerulatus
- Rusty laughingthrush, Pterorhinus poecilorhynchus
- Buffy laughingthrush, Pterorhinus berthemyi
- Chestnut-capped laughingthrush, Pterorhinus mitratus
- Chestnut-hooded laughingthrush, Pterorhinus treacheri
- White-browed laughingthrush, Pterorhinus sannio
- Masked laughingthrush, Pterorhinus perspicillatus
- Chinese babax, Pterorhinus lanceolatus
- Mount Victoria babax, Pterorhinus woodi
- Giant babax, Pterorhinus waddelli
- Tibetan babax, Pterorhinus koslowi
- Streaked laughingthrush, Trochalopteron lineatum
- Bhutan laughingthrush, Trochalopteron imbricatum
- Striped laughingthrush, Trochalopteron virgatum
- Scaly laughingthrush, Trochalopteron subunicolor
- Brown-capped laughingthrush, Trochalopteron austeni
- Blue-winged laughingthrush, Trochalopteron squamatum
- Elliot's laughingthrush, Trochalopteron elliotii
- Variegated laughingthrush, Trochalopteron variegatum
- Prince Henry's laughingthrush, Trochalopteron henrici
- Black-faced laughingthrush, Trochalopteron affine
- White-whiskered laughingthrush, Trochalopteron morrisonianum
- Chestnut-crowned laughingthrush, Trochalopteron erythrocephalum
- Assam laughingthrush, Trochalopteron chrysopterum
- Silver-eared laughingthrush, Trochalopteron melanostigma
- Malayan laughingthrush, Trochalopteron peninsulae
- Golden-winged laughingthrush, Trochalopteron ngoclinhense
- Collared laughingthrush, Trochalopteron yersini
- Red-winged laughingthrush, Trochalopteron formosum
- Red-tailed laughingthrush, Trochalopteron milnei
- Banasura laughingthrush, Montecincla jerdoni
- Nilgiri laughingthrush, Montecincla cachinnans
- Palani laughingthrush, Montecincla fairbanki
- Ashambu laughingthrush, Montecincla meridionalis
- Rufous sibia, Heterophasia capistrata
- Gray sibia, Heterophasia gracilis
- Black-backed sibia, Heterophasia melanoleuca
- Black-headed sibia, Heterophasia desgodinsi
- White-eared sibia, Heterophasia auricularis
- Beautiful sibia, Heterophasia pulchella
- Long-tailed sibia, Heterophasia picaoides
- Silver-eared mesia, Leiothrix argentauris
- Red-billed leiothrix, Leiothrix lutea
- Red-tailed minla, Minla ignotincta
- Rufous-backed sibia, Leioptila annectens
- Gray-crowned crocias, Laniellus langbianis
- Spotted crocias, Laniellus albonotatus
- Gray-faced liocichla, Liocichla omeiensis
- Bugun liocichla, Liocichla bugunorum
- Steere's liocichla, Liocichla steerii
- Red-faced liocichla, Liocichla phoenicea
- Scarlet-faced liocichla, Liocichla ripponi
- Black-crowned barwing, Actinodura sodangorum
- Hoary-throated barwing, Actinodura nipalensis
- Streak-throated barwing, Actinodura waldeni
- Streaked barwing, Actinodura souliei
- Taiwan barwing, Actinodura morrisoniana
- Rusty-fronted barwing, Actinodura egertoni
- Spectacled barwing, Actinodura ramsayi
- Blue-winged minla, Actinodura cyanouroptera
- Chestnut-tailed minla, Actinodura strigula

== Kinglets ==
Order: Passeriformes Family: Regulidae

The kinglets, also called crests, are a small group of birds often included in the Old World warblers, but frequently given family status because they also resemble the titmice.

- Ruby-crowned kinglet, Corthylio calendula
- Goldcrest, Regulus regulus
- Flamecrest, Regulus goodfellowi
- Common firecrest, Regulus ignicapilla
- Madeira firecrest, Regulus madeirensis

== Wallcreeper ==
Order: Passeriformes Family: Tichodromidae

The wallcreeper is a small bird, with stunning crimson, gray and black plumage, related to the nuthatch family.

- Wallcreeper, Tichodroma muraria

== Nuthatches ==
Order: Passeriformes Family: Sittidae

Nuthatches are small woodland birds. They have the unusual ability to climb down trees head first, unlike other birds which can only go upwards. Nuthatches have big heads, short tails and powerful bills and feet.

- Indian nuthatch, Sitta castanea
- Chestnut-bellied nuthatch, Sitta cinnamoventris
- Burmese nuthatch, Sitta neglecta
- Eurasian nuthatch, Sitta europaea
- Chestnut-vented nuthatch, Sitta nagaensis
- Kashmir nuthatch, Sitta cashmirensis
- White-tailed nuthatch, Sitta himalayensis
- White-browed nuthatch, Sitta victoriae
- Red-breasted nuthatch, Sitta canadensis
- White-cheeked nuthatch, Sitta leucopsis
- Przevalski's nuthatch, Sitta przewalskii
- Krüper's nuthatch, Sitta krueperi
- Snowy-browed nuthatch, Sitta villosa
- Yunnan nuthatch, Sitta yunnanensis
- Western rock nuthatch, Sitta neumayer
- Eastern rock nuthatch, Sitta tephronota
- Velvet-fronted nuthatch, Sitta frontalis
- Yellow-billed nuthatch, Sitta solangiae
- Sulphur-billed nuthatch, Sitta oenochlamys
- Blue nuthatch, Sitta azurea
- Giant nuthatch, Sitta magna
- Beautiful nuthatch, Sitta formosa
- Corsican nuthatch, Sitta whiteheadi
- Algerian nuthatch, Sitta ledanti

== Treecreepers ==
Order: Passeriformes Family: Certhiidae

Treecreepers are small woodland birds, brown above and white below. They have thin pointed down-curved bills, which they use to extricate insects from bark. They have stiff tail feathers, like woodpeckers, which they use to support themselves on vertical trees.

- Eurasian treecreeper, Certhia familiaris
- Hodgson's treecreeper, Certhia hodgsoni
- Sichuan treecreeper, Certhia tianquanensis
- Short-toed treecreeper, Certhia brachydactyla
- Bar-tailed treecreeper, Certhia himalayana
- Rusty-flanked treecreeper, Certhia nipalensis
- Sikkim treecreeper, Certhia discolor
- Hume's treecreeper, Certhia manipurensis

== Spotted creepers ==
Order: Passeriformes Family: Salpornithidae

Spotted creepers are similar to the treecreepers of Certhiidae but lack the characteristic stiffened tail feathers. They build cup nests joined together with spider webs and decorated with lichen.

- Indian spotted creeper, Salpornis spilonota

== Wrens ==
Order: Passeriformes Family: Troglodytidae

The wrens are mainly small and inconspicuous except for their loud songs. These birds have short wings and thin down-turned bills. Several species often hold their tails upright. All are insectivorous.

- Eurasian wren, Troglodytes troglodytes
- Pacific wren, Troglodytes pacificus
- Winter wren, Troglodytes hiemalis
- Marsh wren, Cistothorus palustris

== Spotted elachura ==
Order: Passeriformes Family: Elachuridae

This species, the only one in its family, inhabits forest undergrowth throughout South East Asia.

- Spotted elachura, Elachura formosa

== Dippers ==
Order: Passeriformes Family: Cinclidae

Dippers are a group of perching birds whose habitat includes aquatic environments in the Americas, Europe and Asia. They are named for their bobbing or dipping movements.

- White-throated dipper, Cinclus cinclus
- Brown dipper, Cinclus pallasii

== Oxpeckers ==
- Red-billed oxpecker, Buphagus erythrorhynchus (A)

== Starlings ==
Order: Passeriformes Family: Sturnidae

Starlings are small to medium-sized passerine birds. Their flight is strong and direct and they are very gregarious. Their preferred habitat is fairly open country. They eat insects and fruit. Plumage is typically dark with a metallic sheen.

- Stripe-sided rhabdornis, Rhabdornis mysticalis
- Long-billed rhabdornis, Rhabdornis grandis
- Stripe-breasted rhabdornis, Rhabdornis inornatus
- Visayan rhabdornis, Rhabdornis rabori
- Fiery-browed myna, Enodes erythrophris
- Finch-billed myna, Scissirostrum dubium
- Metallic starling, Aplonis metallica
- Yellow-eyed starling, Aplonis mystacea
- Tanimbar starling, Aplonis crassa
- Long-tailed starling, Aplonis magna
- Singing starling, Aplonis cantoroides
- Asian glossy starling, Aplonis panayensis
- Moluccan starling, Aplonis mysolensis
- Polynesian starling, Aplonis tabuensis
- Short-tailed starling, Aplonis minor
- Sulawesi myna, Basilornis celebensis
- Helmeted myna, Basilornis galeatus
- Long-crested myna, Basilornis corythaix
- Apo myna, Basilornis mirandus
- Coleto, Sarcops calvus
- White-necked myna, Streptocitta albicollis
- Bare-eyed myna, Streptocitta albertinae
- Yellow-faced myna, Mino dumontii
- Golden myna, Mino anais
- Golden-crested myna, Ampeliceps coronatus
- Sri Lanka myna, Gracula ptilogenys
- Common hill myna, Gracula religiosa
- Southern hill myna, Gracula indica
- Enggano myna, Gracula enganensis
- Nias myna, Gracula robusta
- European starling, Sturnus vulgaris
- Spotless starling, Sturnus unicolor
- Wattled starling, Creatophora cinerea
- Rosy starling, Pastor roseus
- Daurian starling, Agropsar sturninus
- Chestnut-cheeked starling, Agropsar philippensis
- Black-collared starling, Gracupica nigricollis
- Indian pied starling, Gracupica contra
- Javan pied starling, Gracupica jalla
- Siamese pied starling, Gracupica floweri
- White-faced starling, Sturnornis albofrontatus
- Bali myna, Leucopsar rothschildi
- White-shouldered starling, Sturnia sinensis
- Brahminy starling, Sturnia pagodarum
- Chestnut-tailed starling, Sturnia malabarica
- Malabar starling, Sturnia blythii
- Red-billed starling, Spodiopsar sericeus
- White-cheeked starling, Spodiopsar cineraceus
- Common myna, Acridotheres tristis
- Bank myna, Acridotheres ginginianus
- Burmese myna, Acridotheres burmannicus
- Vinous-breasted myna, Acridotheres leucocephalus
- Black-winged myna, Acridotheres melanopterus
- Jungle myna, Acridotheres fuscus
- Javan myna, Acridotheres javanicus
- Pale-bellied myna, Acridotheres cinereus
- Collared myna, Acridotheres albocinctus
- Great myna, Acridotheres grandis
- Crested myna, Acridotheres cristatellus
- Tristram's starling, Onychognathus tristramii
- Somali starling, Onychognathus blythii
- Socotra starling, Onychognathus frater
- Spot-winged starling, Saroglossa spilopterus
- Purple starling, Lamprotornis purpureus
- Superb starling, Lamprotornis superbus
- Splendid starling, Lamprotornis splendidus
- Golden-breasted starling, Lamprotornis regius
- Greater blue-eared starling, Lamprotornis chalybaeus
- Cape starling, Lamprotornis nitens
- Violet-backed starling, Cinnyricinclus leucogaster

== Mimids ==
- Gray catbird, Dumetella carolinensis
- Brown thrasher, Toxostoma rufum
- Tropical mockingbird, Mimus gilvus

== Thrushes and allies ==
Order: Passeriformes Family: Turdidae

The thrushes are a group of passerine birds that occur mainly in the Old World. They are plump, soft plumaged, small to medium-sized insectivores or sometimes omnivores, often feeding on the ground. Many have attractive songs.

- Grandala, Grandala coelicolor
- Long-tailed thrush, Zoothera dixoni
- Alpine thrush, Zoothera mollissima
- Himalayan thrush, Zoothera salimalii
- Sichuan thrush, Zoothera griseiceps
- Geomalia, Zoothera heinrichi
- Dark-sided thrush, Zoothera marginata
- Long-billed thrush, Zoothera monticola
- Everett's thrush, Zoothera everetti
- Sunda thrush, Zoothera andromedae
- White's thrush, Zoothera aurea
- Scaly thrush, Zoothera dauma
- Amami thrush, Zoothera major
- Nilgiri thrush, Zoothera neilgherriensis
- Sri Lanka thrush, Zoothera imbricata
- Bonin thrush, Zoothera terrestris (X)
- Russet-tailed thrush, Zoothera heinei
- Fawn-breasted thrush, Zoothera machiki
- Sulawesi thrush, Cataponera turdoides
- Fruit-hunter, Chlamydochaera jefferyi
- Purple cochoa, Cochoa purpurea
- Green cochoa, Cochoa viridis
- Sumatran cochoa, Cochoa beccarii
- Javan cochoa, Cochoa azurea
- Varied thrush, Ixoreus naevius
- Gray-cheeked thrush, Catharus minimus
- Swainson's thrush, Catharus ustulatus (A)
- Hermit thrush, Catharus guttatus
- Veery, Catharus fuscescens
- Bicknell's thrush, Catharus bicknelli
- Siberian thrush, Geokichla sibirica
- Pied thrush, Geokichla wardii
- Spot-winged thrush, Geokichla spiloptera
- Ashy thrush, Geokichla cinerea
- Buru thrush, Geokichla dumasi
- Seram thrush, Geokichla joiceyi
- Chestnut-capped thrush, Geokichla interpres
- Enggano thrush, Geokichla leucolaema
- Chestnut-backed thrush, Geokichla dohertyi
- Orange-banded thrush, Geokichla peronii
- Slaty-backed thrush, Geokichla schistacea
- Rusty-backed thrush, Geokichla erythronota
- Red-and-black thrush, Geokichla mendeni
- Orange-headed thrush, Geokichla citrina
- Chinese thrush, Otocichla mupinensis
- Mistle thrush, Turdus viscivorus
- Song thrush, Turdus philomelos
- Redwing, Turdus iliacus
- Eurasian blackbird, Turdus merula
- Chinese blackbird, Turdus mandarinus
- Yemen thrush, Turdus menachensis
- American robin, Turdus migratorius (A)
- Taiwan thrush, Turdus niveiceps
- Gray-winged blackbird, Turdus boulboul
- Indian blackbird, Turdus simillimus
- Japanese thrush, Turdus cardis
- Gray-backed thrush, Turdus hortulorum
- Tickell's thrush, Turdus unicolor
- Black-breasted thrush, Turdus dissimilis
- Gray-sided thrush, Turdus feae
- Eyebrowed thrush, Turdus obscurus
- Brown-headed thrush, Turdus chrysolaus
- Izu thrush, Turdus celaenops
- Pale thrush, Turdus pallidus
- Island thrush, Turdus poliocephalus
- White-backed thrush, Turdus kessleri
- Tibetan blackbird, Turdus maximus
- Fieldfare, Turdus pilaris
- White-collared blackbird, Turdus albocinctus
- Chestnut thrush, Turdus rubrocanus
- Ring ouzel, Turdus torquatus
- Black-throated thrush, Turdus atrogularis
- Red-throated thrush, Turdus ruficollis
- Dusky thrush, Turdus eunomus
- Naumann's thrush, Turdus naumanni
- Rufous-bellied thrush, Turdus rufiventris
- Austral thrush, Turdus falcklandii
- Wood thrush, Hylocichla mustelina

== Old World flycatchers ==
Order: Passeriformes Family: Muscicapidae

Old World flycatchers are a large group of small arboreal insectivores. The appearance of these birds is highly varied, but they mostly have weak songs and harsh calls.

- Gray-streaked flycatcher, Muscicapa griseisticta
- Dark-sided flycatcher, Muscicapa sibirica
- Ferruginous flycatcher, Muscicapa ferruginea
- Asian brown flycatcher, Muscicapa dauurica
- Ashy-breasted flycatcher, Muscicapa randi
- Sumba brown flycatcher, Muscicapa segregata
- Brown-breasted flycatcher, Muscicapa muttui
- Sulawesi brown flycatcher, Muscicapa sodhii (E)
- Brown-streaked flycatcher, Muscicapa williamsoni
- Spotted flycatcher, Muscicapa striata
- Gambaga flycatcher, Muscicapa gambagae
- Black scrub-robin, Cercotrichas podobe
- Rufous-tailed scrub-robin, Cercotrichas galactotes
- Indian robin, Copsychus fulicatus
- Oriental magpie-robin, Copsychus saularis
- Rufous-tailed shama, Copsychus pyrropygus
- Philippine magpie-robin, Copsychus mindanensis
- White-rumped shama, Copsychus malabaricus
- White-crowned shama, Copsychus stricklandii
- Andaman shama, Copsychus albiventris
- White-browed shama, Copsychus luzoniensis
- Visayan shama, Copsychus superciliaris
- White-vented shama, Copsychus niger
- Black shama, Copsychus cebuensis
- White-gorgeted flycatcher, Anthipes monileger
- Rufous-browed flycatcher, Anthipes solitaris
- Nilgiri sholakili, Sholicola major
- White-bellied sholakili, Sholicola albiventris
- Matinan flycatcher, Cyornis sanfordi
- Blue-fronted flycatcher, Cyornis hoevelli
- Timor blue flycatcher, Cyornis hyacinthinus
- White-tailed flycatcher, Cyornis concretus
- Rück's blue flycatcher, Cyornis ruckii
- Blue-breasted flycatcher, Cyornis herioti
- Hainan blue flycatcher, Cyornis hainanus
- White-bellied blue flycatcher, Cyornis pallipes
- Pale-chinned blue flycatcher, Cyornis poliogenys
- Pale blue flycatcher, Cyornis unicolor
- Blue-throated flycatcher, Cyornis rubeculoides
- Chinese blue flycatcher, Cyornis glaucicomans
- Large blue flycatcher, Cyornis magnirostris
- Hill blue flycatcher, Cyornis whitei
- Javan blue flycatcher, Cyornis banyumas
- Dayak blue flycatcher, Cyornis montanus
- Meratus blue flycatcher, Cyornis kadayangensis
- Sunda blue flycatcher, Cyornis caerulatus
- Malaysian blue flycatcher, Cyornis turcosus
- Palawan blue flycatcher, Cyornis lemprieri
- Bornean blue flycatcher, Cyornis superbus
- Tickell's blue flycatcher, Cyornis tickelliae
- Indochinese blue flycatcher, Cyornis sumatrensis
- Mangrove blue flycatcher, Cyornis rufigastra
- Sulawesi blue flycatcher, Cyornis omissus
- Brown-chested jungle-flycatcher, Cyornis brunneatus
- Nicobar jungle-flycatcher, Cyornis nicobaricus
- Gray-chested jungle-flycatcher, Cyornis umbratilis
- Fulvous-chested jungle-flycatcher, Cyornis olivaceus
- Chestnut-tailed jungle-flycatcher, Cyornis ruficauda
- Banggai jungle-flycatcher, Cyornis pelingensis
- Sula jungle-flycatcher, Cyornis colonus
- Large niltava, Niltava grandis
- Small niltava, Niltava macgrigoriae
- Fujian niltava, Niltava davidi
- Rufous-bellied niltava, Niltava sundara
- Rufous-vented niltava, Niltava sumatrana
- Chinese vivid niltava, Niltava oatesi
- Taiwan vivid niltava, Niltava vivida
- Blue-and-white flycatcher, Cyanoptila cyanomelana
- Zappey's flycatcher, Cyanoptila cumatilis
- Flores jungle flycatcher, Eumyias oscillans
- Sumba jungle flycatcher, Eumyias stresemanni
- Dull-blue flycatcher, Eumyias sordidus
- Nilgiri flycatcher, Eumyias sordidus
- Indigo flycatcher, Eumyias indigo
- Verditer flycatcher, Eumyias thalassinus
- Buru jungle-flycatcher, Eumyias additus
- Turquoise flycatcher, Eumyias panayensis
- European robin, Erithacus rubecula
- Bagobo robin, Leonardina woodi
- Eyebrowed jungle-flycatcher, Vauriella gularis
- Rusty-flanked jungle-flycatcher, Vauriella insignis
- Negros jungle-flycatcher, Vauriella albigularis
- Mindanao jungle-flycatcher, Vauriella goodfellowi
- Great shortwing, Heinrichia calligyna
- Rusty-bellied shortwing, Brachypteryx hyperythra
- Gould's shortwing, Brachypteryx stellata
- Lesser shortwing, Brachypteryx leucophrys
- Himalayan shortwing, Brachypteryx cruralis
- Chinese shortwing, Brachypteryx sinensis
- Taiwan shortwing, Brachypteryx goodfellowi
- Philippine shortwing, Brachypteryx poliogyna
- Bornean shortwing, Brachypteryx erythrogyna
- Sumatran shortwing, Brachypteryx saturata
- Javan shortwing, Brachypteryx montana
- Flores shortwing, Brachypteryx floris
- Rufous-tailed robin, Larvivora sibilans
- Rufous-headed robin, Larvivora ruficeps
- Japanese robin, Larvivora akahige
- Izu robin, Larvivora tanensis
- Ryukyu robin, Larvivora komadori
- Okinawa robin, Larvivora namiyei.
- Indian blue robin, Larvivora brunnea
- Siberian blue robin, Larvivora cyane
- White-throated robin, Irania gutturalis
- Thrush nightingale, Luscinia luscinia
- Common nightingale, Luscinia megarhynchos
- White-bellied redstart, Luscinia phaenicuroides
- Bluethroat, Luscinia svecica
- Sri Lanka whistling-thrush, Myophonus blighi
- Shiny whistling-thrush, Myophonus melanurus
- Javan whistling-thrush, Myophonus glaucinus
- Sumatran whistling-thrush, Myophonus castaneus
- Bornean whistling-thrush, Myophonus borneensis
- Malayan whistling-thrush, Myophonus robinsoni
- Malabar whistling-thrush, Myophonus horsfieldii
- Taiwan whistling-thrush, Myophonus insularis
- Blue whistling-thrush, Myophonus caeruleus
- Little forktail, Enicurus scouleri
- White-crowned forktail, Enicurus leschenaulti
- Bornean forktail, Enicurus borneensis
- Spotted forktail, Enicurus maculatus
- Sunda forktail, Enicurus velatus
- Chestnut-naped forktail, Enicurus ruficapillus
- Black-backed forktail, Enicurus immaculatus
- Slaty-backed forktail, Enicurus schistaceus
- Firethroat, Calliope pectardens
- Blackthroat, Calliope obscura
- Siberian rubythroat, Calliope calliope
- Himalayan rubythroat, Calliope pectoralis
- Chinese rubythroat, Calliope tschebaiewi
- White-tailed robin, Myiomela leucurum
- Sunda robin, Myiomela diana
- Blue-fronted robin, Cinclidium frontale
- Red-flanked bluetail, Tarsiger cyanurus
- Himalayan bluetail, Tarsiger rufilatus
- Rufous-breasted bush-robin, Tarsiger hyperythrus
- White-browed bush-robin, Tarsiger indicus
- Golden bush-robin, Tarsiger chrysaeus
- Collared bush-robin, Tarsiger johnstoniae
- Yellow-rumped flycatcher, Ficedula zanthopygia
- Green-backed flycatcher, Ficedula elisae
- Narcissus flycatcher, Ficedula narcissina
- Ryukyu flycatcher, Ficedula owstoni
- Mugimaki flycatcher, Ficedula mugimaki
- Slaty-backed flycatcher, Ficedula hodgsonii
- Black-and-orange flycatcher, Ficedula nigrorufa
- Slaty-blue flycatcher, Ficedula tricolor
- Snowy-browed flycatcher, Ficedula hyperythra
- Pygmy flycatcher, Ficedula hodgsoni
- Rufous-gorgeted flycatcher, Ficedula strophiata
- Sapphire flycatcher, Ficedula sapphira
- Little pied flycatcher, Ficedula westermanni
- Ultramarine flycatcher, Ficedula superciliaris
- Rusty-tailed flycatcher, Ficedula ruficauda
- Taiga flycatcher, Ficedula albicilla
- Kashmir flycatcher, Ficedula subrubra
- Red-breasted flycatcher, Ficedula parva
- Semicollared flycatcher, Ficedula semitorquata
- European pied flycatcher, Ficedula hypoleuca
- Collared flycatcher, Ficedula albicollis
- Tanimbar flycatcher, Ficedula riedeli
- Rufous-chested flycatcher, Ficedula dumetoria
- Palawan flycatcher, Ficedula platenae
- Furtive flycatcher, Ficedula disposita
- Rufous-throated flycatcher, Ficedula rufigula
- Damar flycatcher, Ficedula henrici
- Cinnamon-chested flycatcher, Ficedula buruensis
- Lompobattang flycatcher, Ficedula bonthaina
- Sumba flycatcher, Ficedula harterti
- Black-banded flycatcher, Ficedula timorensis
- Beijing flycatcher, Ficedula beijingnica
- Cryptic flycatcher, Ficedula crypta
- Bundok flycatcher, Ficedula luzoniensis
- Blue-fronted redstart, Phoenicurus frontalis
- Plumbeous redstart, Phoenicurus fuliginosus
- Luzon redstart, Phoenicurus bicolor
- Rufous-backed redstart, Phoenicurus erythronotus
- White-capped redstart, Phoenicurus leucocephalus
- Ala Shan redstart, Phoenicurus alaschanicus
- Blue-capped redstart, Phoenicurus caeruleocephala
- Common redstart, Phoenicurus phoenicurus
- Hodgson's redstart, Phoenicurus hodgsoni
- White-throated redstart, Phoenicurus schisticeps
- White-winged redstart, Phoenicurus erythrogastrus
- Black redstart, Phoenicurus ochruros
- Daurian redstart, Phoenicurus auroreus
- Moussier's redstart, Phoenicurus moussieri
- Little rock-thrush, Monticola rufocinereus
- Chestnut-bellied rock-thrush, Monticola rufiventris
- White-throated rock-thrush, Monticola gularis
- Blue-capped rock-thrush, Monticola cinclorhyncha
- Rufous-tailed rock-thrush, Monticola saxatilis
- Blue rock-thrush, Monticola solitarius
- Whinchat, Saxicola rubetra
- White-browed bushchat, Saxicola macrorhynchus
- White-throated bushchat, Saxicola insignis
- European stonechat, Saxicola rubicola
- Siberian stonechat, Saxicola maurus
- Amur stonechat, Saxicola stejnegeri
- White-tailed stonechat, Saxicola leucurus
- Pied bushchat, Saxicola caprata
- Jerdon's bushchat, Saxicola jerdoni
- Gray bushchat, Saxicola ferreus
- Timor bushchat, Saxicola gutturalis
- African stonechat, Saxicola torquatus
- Northern wheatear, Oenanthe oenanthe
- Isabelline wheatear, Oenanthe isabellina
- Hooded wheatear, Oenanthe monacha
- Desert wheatear, Oenanthe deserti
- Pied wheatear, Oenanthe pleschanka
- Eastern black-eared wheatear, Oenanthe melanoleuca
- Cyprus wheatear, Oenanthe cypriaca
- Red-rumped wheatear, Oenanthe moesta
- Blackstart, Oenanthe melanura
- Familiar chat, Oenanthe familiaris
- Brown rock chat, Oenanthe fusca
- Variable wheatear, Oenanthe picata
- Hume's wheatear, Oenanthe albonigra
- White-crowned wheatear, Oenanthe leucopyga
- Arabian wheatear, Oenanthe lugentoides
- Finsch's wheatear, Oenanthe finschii
- Mourning wheatear, Oenanthe lugens
- Black wheatear, Oenanthe leucura
- Kurdish wheatear, Oenanthe xanthoprymna
- Persian wheatear, Oenanthe chrysopygia
- Red-breasted wheatear, Oenanthe bottae
- Heuglin's wheatear, Oenanthe heuglini
- Abyssinian wheatear, Oenanthe lugubris

== Waxwings ==
Order: Passeriformes Family: Bombycillidae

The waxwings are a group of birds with soft silky plumage and unique red tips to some of the wing feathers. In the Bohemian and cedar waxwings, these tips look like sealing wax and give the group its name. These are arboreal birds of northern forests. They live on insects in summer and berries in winter.

- Bohemian waxwing, Bombycilla garrulus
- Japanese waxwing, Bombycilla japonica

== Hylocitrea ==
Order: Passeriformes Family: Hylocitreidae

The hylocitrea (Hylocitrea bonensis), also known as the yellow-flanked whistler or olive-flanked whistler, is a species of bird that is endemic to montane forests on the Indonesian island of Sulawesi.

- Hylocitrea, Hylocitrea bonensis

== Hypocolius ==
Order: Passeriformes Family: Hypocoliidae

The hypocolius is a small Middle Eastern species. They are mainly a uniform grey colour except the males have a black triangular mask around their eyes.

- Hypocolius, Hypocolius ampelinus

== Flowerpeckers ==
Order: Passeriformes Family: Dicaeidae

The flowerpeckers are very small, stout, often brightly coloured birds, with short tails, short thick curved bills, and tubular tongues.

- Olive-backed flowerpecker, Prionochilus olivaceus
- Yellow-breasted flowerpecker, Prionochilus maculatus
- Crimson-breasted flowerpecker, Prionochilus percussus
- Palawan flowerpecker, Prionochilus plateni
- Yellow-rumped flowerpecker, Prionochilus xanthopygius
- Scarlet-breasted flowerpecker, Prionochilus thoracicus
- Spectacled flowerpecker, Dicaeum dayakorum
- Golden-rumped flowerpecker, Dicaeum annae
- Thick-billed flowerpecker, Dicaeum agile
- Brown-backed flowerpecker, Dicaeum everetti
- Whiskered flowerpecker, Dicaeum proprium
- Yellow-vented flowerpecker, Dicaeum chrysorrheum
- Yellow-bellied flowerpecker, Dicaeum melanozanthum
- White-throated flowerpecker, Dicaeum vincens
- Yellow-sided flowerpecker, Dicaeum aureolimbatum
- Olive-capped flowerpecker, Dicaeum nigrilore
- Flame-crowned flowerpecker, Dicaeum anthonyi
- Bicolored flowerpecker, Dicaeum bicolor
- Cebu flowerpecker, Dicaeum quadricolor
- Red-keeled flowerpecker, Dicaeum australe
- Black-belted flowerpecker, Dicaeum haematostictum
- Scarlet-collared flowerpecker, Dicaeum retrocinctum
- Orange-bellied flowerpecker, Dicaeum trigonostigma
- White-bellied flowerpecker, Dicaeum hypoleucum
- Pale-billed flowerpecker, Dicaeum erythrorhynchos
- Nilgiri flowerpecker, Dicaeum concolor
- Plain flowerpecker, Dicaeum minullum
- Andaman flowerpecker, Dicaeum virescens
- Pygmy flowerpecker, Dicaeum pygmaeum
- Crimson-crowned flowerpecker, Dicaeum nehrkorni
- Halmahera flowerpecker, Dicaeum schistaceiceps
- Buru flowerpecker, Dicaeum erythrothorax
- Ashy flowerpecker, Dicaeum vulneratum
- Olive-crowned flowerpecker, Dicaeum pectorale
- Red-capped flowerpecker, Dicaeum geelvinkianum
- Black-fronted flowerpecker, Dicaeum igniferum
- Red-chested flowerpecker, Dicaeum maugei
- Fire-breasted flowerpecker, Dicaeum ignipectus
- Black-sided flowerpecker, Dicaeum monticolum
- Gray-sided flowerpecker, Dicaeum celebicum
- Blood-breasted flowerpecker, Dicaeum sanguinolentum
- Mistletoebird, Dicaeum hirundinaceum
- Scarlet-backed flowerpecker, Dicaeum cruentatum
- Scarlet-headed flowerpecker, Dicaeum trochileum

== Sunbirds and spiderhunters ==
Order: Passeriformes Family: Nectariniidae

The sunbirds and spiderhunters are very small passerine birds which feed largely on nectar, although they will also take insects, especially when feeding young. Their flight is fast and direct on short wings. Most species can take nectar by hovering like a hummingbird, but usually perch to feed.

- Ruby-cheeked sunbird, Chalcoparia singalensis
- Plain sunbird, Anthreptes simplex
- Brown-throated sunbird, Anthreptes malacensis
- Gray-throated sunbird, Anthreptes griseigularis
- Red-throated sunbird, Anthreptes rhodolaemus
- Nile Valley sunbird, Hedydipna metallica
- Pygmy sunbird, Hedydipna platura
- Purple-naped sunbird, Hypogramma hypogrammicum
- Purple-rumped sunbird, Leptocoma zeylonica
- Crimson-backed sunbird, Leptocoma minima
- Van Hasselt's sunbird, Leptocoma brasiliana
- Purple-throated sunbird, Leptocoma sperata
- Black sunbird, Leptocoma sericea
- Copper-throated sunbird, Leptocoma calcostetha
- Palestine sunbird, Cinnyris osea
- Purple sunbird, Cinnyris asiaticus
- Olive-backed sunbird, Cinnyris jugularis
- Apricot-breasted sunbird, Cinnyris buettikoferi
- Flame-breasted sunbird, Cinnyris solaris
- Loten's sunbird, Cinnyris lotenius
- Shining sunbird, Cinnyris habessinicus
- Variable sunbird, Cinnyris venustus
- Orange-tufted sunbird, Cinnyris bouvieri
- Elegant sunbird, Aethopyga duyvenbodei
- Fire-tailed sunbird, Aethopyga ignicauda
- Black-throated sunbird, Aethopyga saturata
- Mrs. Gould's sunbird, Aethopyga gouldiae
- Green-tailed sunbird, Aethopyga nipalensis
- Lovely sunbird, Aethopyga shelleyi
- Temminck's sunbird, Aethopyga temminckii
- Javan sunbird, Aethopyga mystacalis
- Vigors's sunbird, Aethopyga vigorsii
- Crimson sunbird, Aethopyga siparaja
- Magnificent sunbird, Aethopyga magnifica
- Fork-tailed sunbird, Aethopyga christinae
- Handsome sunbird, Aethopyga bella
- White-flanked sunbird, Aethopyga eximia
- Flaming sunbird, Aethopyga flagrans
- Maroon-naped sunbird, Aethopyga guimarasensis
- Metallic-winged sunbird, Aethopyga pulcherrima
- Mountain sunbird, Aethopyga jefferyi
- Bohol sunbird, Aethopyga decorosa
- Lina's sunbird, Aethopyga linaraborae
- Gray-hooded sunbird, Aethopyga primigenia
- Apo sunbird, Aethopyga boltoni
- Tboli sunbird, Aethopyga tibolii
- Purple-naped spiderhunter, Kurochkinegramma hypogrammicum
- Thick-billed spiderhunter, Arachnothera crassirostris
- Long-billed spiderhunter, Arachnothera robusta
- Orange-tufted spiderhunter, Arachnothera flammifera
- Pale spiderhunter, Arachnothera dilutior
- Little spiderhunter, Arachnothera longirostra
- Whitehead's spiderhunter, Arachnothera juliae
- Naked-faced spiderhunter, Arachnothera clarae
- Yellow-eared spiderhunter, Arachnothera chrysogenys
- Spectacled spiderhunter, Arachnothera flavigaster
- Streaked spiderhunter, Arachnothera magna
- Streaky-breasted spiderhunter, Arachnothera affinis
- Gray-breasted spiderhunter, Arachnothera modesta
- Bornean spiderhunter, Arachnothera everetti
- Socotra sunbird, Chalcomitra balfouri
- Scarlet-chested sunbird, Chalcomitra senegalensis

== Fairy-bluebirds ==
Order: Passeriformes Family: Irenidae

The fairy-bluebirds are bulbul-like birds of open forest or thorn scrub. The males are dark-blue and the females a duller green.

- Asian fairy-bluebird, Irena puella
- Philippine fairy-bluebird, Irena cyanogastra

== Leafbirds ==
Order: Passeriformes Family: Chloropseidae

The leafbirds are small, bulbul-like birds. The males are brightly plumaged, usually in greens and yellows.

- Philippine leafbird, Chloropsis flavipennis
- Yellow-throated leafbird, Chloropsis palawanensis
- Greater green leafbird, Chloropsis sonnerati
- Lesser green leafbird, Chloropsis cyanopogon
- Blue-winged leafbird, Chloropsis cochinchinensis
- Bornean leafbird, Chloropsis kinabaluensis
- Jerdon's leafbird, Chloropsis jerdoni
- Golden-fronted leafbird, Chloropsis aurifrons
- Sumatran leafbird, Chloropsis media
- Orange-bellied leafbird, Chloropsis hardwickii
- Blue-masked leafbird, Chloropsis venusta

== Pinktails ==
Order: Passeriformes Family: Urocynchramidae

Przevalski's pinktail is an unusual passerine bird endemic to the mountains of central-west China.

- Przevalski's pinktail, Urocynchramus pylzowi

== Weavers and allies ==
Order: Passeriformes Family: Ploceidae

The weavers are small passerine birds related to the finches. They are seed-eating birds with rounded conical bills. The males of many species are brightly colored, usually in red or yellow and black, some species show variation in color only in the breeding season.

- Lesser masked-weaver, Ploceus intermedius (I)
- Rüppell's weaver, Ploceus galbula
- Golden-backed weaver, Ploceus jacksoni (I)
- Streaked weaver, Ploceus manyar
- Baya weaver, Ploceus philippinus
- Asian golden weaver, Ploceus hypoxanthus
- Finn's weaver, Ploceus megarhynchus
- Black-breasted weaver, Ploceus benghalensis
- Red fody, Foudia madagascariensis (I)
- Southern masked-weaver, Ploceus velatus
- Village weaver, Ploceus cucullatus
- Taveta golden-weaver, Ploceus castaneiceps
- Chestnut weaver, Ploceus rubiginosus
- Black-headed weaver, Ploceus melanocephalus
- African golden-weaver, Ploceus subaureus
- Northern red bishop, Euplectes franciscanus (I)
- Yellow-crowned bishop, Euplectes afer (I)
- Southern red bishop, Euplectes orix
- Black-winged bishop, Euplectes hordeaceus
- White-winged widowbird, Euplectes albonotatus
- Zanzibar red bishop, Euplectes nigroventris
- Red-collared widowbird, Euplectes ardens
- Fire-fronted bishop, Euplectes diadematus
- Long-tailed widowbird, Euplectes progne
- Red-billed Quelea, Quelea quelea
- Red-headed Quelea, Quelea erythrops
- White-headed Buffalo-weaver, Dinemellia dinemelli

== Waxbills and allies ==
Order: Passeriformes Family: Estrildidae

The estrildid finches are small passerine birds of the Old World tropics and Australasia. They are gregarious and often colonial seed eaters with short thick but pointed bills. They are all similar in structure and habits, but have a wide variation in plumage colors and patterns.

- Orange-cheeked waxbill, Estrilda melpoda (I)
- Arabian waxbill, Estrilda rufibarba
- Crimson-rumped waxbill, Estrilda rhodopyga (I)
- Black-rumped waxbill, Estrilda troglodytes (I)
- Common waxbill, Estrilda astrild
- Lavender waxbill, Glaucestrilda coerulescens
- Zebra waxbill, Amandava subflava
- Green avadavat, Amandava formosa
- Red avadavat, Amandava amandava
- Mountain firetail, Oreostruthus fuliginosus
- Crimson finch, Neochmia phaeton
- Zebra finch, Taeniopygia guttata
- Tawny-breasted parrotfinch, Erythrura hyperythra
- Pin-tailed parrotfinch, Erythrura prasina
- Green-faced parrotfinch, Erythrura viridifacies
- Tricolored parrotfinch, Erythrura tricolor
- Blue-faced parrotfinch, Erythrura trichroa
- Red-eared parrotfinch, Erythrura coloria
- Papuan parrotfinch, Erythrura papuana
- Fiji parrotfinch, Erythrura pealii
- Pink-billed parrotfinch, Erythrura kleinschmidti
- Indian silverbill, Euodice malabarica
- African silverbill, Euodice cantans
- Streak-headed munia, Mayrimunia tristissima
- White-spotted munia, Mayrimunia leucosticta
- White-rumped munia, Lonchura striata
- Javan munia, Lonchura leucogastroides
- Dusky munia, Lonchura fuscans
- Black-faced munia, Lonchura molucca
- Black-throated munia, Lonchura kelaarti
- Scaly-breasted munia, Lonchura punctulata
- White-bellied munia, Lonchura leucogastra
- Tricolored munia, Lonchura malacca
- Chestnut munia, Lonchura atricapilla (I)
- White-capped munia, Lonchura ferruginosa
- Five-colored munia, Lonchura quinticolor
- White-headed munia, Lonchura maja
- Pale-headed munia, Lonchura pallida
- Grand munia, Lonchura grandis
- Gray-banded munia, Lonchura vana
- Gray-crowned munia, Lonchura nevermanni
- Hooded munia, Lonchura spectabilis
- Chestnut-breasted munia, Lonchura castaneothorax
- Black munia, Lonchura stygia
- Black-breasted munia, Lonchura teerinki
- Snow Mountain munia, Lonchura montana
- Alpine munia, Lonchura monticola
- Java sparrow, Padda oryzivora (I)
- Timor sparrow, Padda fuscata
- Green-winged pytilia, Pytilia melba
- Black-and-white mannikin, Spermestes bicolor
- Bronze mannikin, Spermestes cucullata
- Cut-throat, Amadina fasciata
- Blue-capped cordonbleu, Uraeginthus cyanocephalus
- Red-cheeked cordonbleu, Uraeginthus bengalus
- Jameson's firefinch, Lagonosticta rhodopareia
- Red-billed firefinch, Lagonosticta senegala
- African firefinch, Lagonosticta rubricata

== Accentors ==
Order: Passeriformes Family: Prunellidae

The accentors are in the only bird family, Prunellidae, which is completely endemic to the Palearctic. They are small, fairly drab species superficially similar to sparrows.

- Alpine accentor, Prunella collaris
- Altai accentor, Prunella himalayana
- Robin accentor, Prunella rubeculoides
- Rufous-breasted accentor, Prunella strophiata
- Siberian accentor, Prunella montanella
- Radde's accentor, Prunella ocularis
- Brown accentor, Prunella fulvescens
- Black-throated accentor, Prunella atrogularis
- Mongolian accentor, Prunella koslowi
- Dunnock, Prunella modularis
- Japanese accentor, Prunella rubida
- Maroon-backed accentor, Prunella immaculata

== Old World sparrows ==
Order: Passeriformes Family: Passeridae

Old World sparrows are small passerine birds. In general, sparrows tend to be small, plump, brown or gray birds with short tails and short powerful beaks. Sparrows are seed eaters, but they also consume small insects.

- Cinnamon ibon, Hypocryptadius cinnamomeus
- Saxaul sparrow, Passer ammodendri
- House sparrow, Passer domesticus
- Spanish sparrow, Passer hispaniolensis
- Sind sparrow, Passer pyrrhonotus
- Russet sparrow, Passer cinnamomeus
- Plain-backed sparrow, Passer flaveolus
- Dead Sea sparrow, Passer moabiticus
- Zarudny's sparrow, Passer zarudnyi
- Eurasian tree sparrow, Passer montanus
- Arabian golden sparrow, Passer euchlorus
- Abd al-Kuri sparrow, Passer hemileucus
- Socotra sparrow, Passer insularis
- Sudan golden sparrow, Passer luteus
- Cape Verde sparrow, Passer iagoensis
- Desert sparrow, Passer simplex
- Somali sparrow, Passer castanopterus
- Cape sparrow, Passer melanurus
- Yellow-throated sparrow, Gymnoris xanthocollis
- Sahel bush sparrow, Gymnoris dentata
- Rock sparrow, Petronia petronia
- Pale rockfinch, Carpospiza brachydactyla
- White-winged snowfinch, Montifringilla nivalis
- Black-winged snowfinch, Montifringilla adamsi
- Tibetan snowfinch, Montifringilla henrici
- White-rumped snowfinch, Montifringilla taczanowskii
- Pere David's snowfinch, Montifringilla davidiana
- Rufous-necked snowfinch, Montifringilla ruficollis
- Blanford's snowfinch, Montifringilla blanfordi
- Afghan snowfinch, Montifringilla theresae

== Wagtails and pipits ==
Order: Passeriformes Family: Motacillidae

Motacillidae is a family of small passerine birds with medium to long tails. They include the wagtails, longclaws and pipits. They are slender, ground feeding insectivores of open country.

- Forest wagtail, Dendronanthus indicus
- Gray wagtail, Motacilla cinerea
- Western yellow wagtail, Motacilla flava
- Eastern yellow wagtail, Motacilla tschutschensis
- Citrine wagtail, Motacilla citreola
- White-browed wagtail, Motacilla maderaspatensis
- Mekong wagtail, Motacilla samveasnae
- Japanese wagtail, Motacilla grandis
- White wagtail, Motacilla alba
- African pied wagtail, Motacilla aguimp
- Madanga, Madanga ruficollis
- Richard's pipit, Anthus richardi
- Paddyfield pipit, Anthus rufulus
- Long-billed pipit, Anthus similis
- Blyth's pipit, Anthus godlewskii
- Tawny pipit, Anthus campestris
- Nilgiri pipit, Anthus nilghiriensis
- Upland pipit, Anthus sylvanus
- Alpine pipit, Anthus gutturalis
- Meadow pipit, Anthus pratensis
- Rosy pipit, Anthus roseatus
- Tree pipit, Anthus trivialis
- Olive-backed pipit, Anthus hodgsoni
- Pechora pipit, Anthus gustavi
- Red-throated pipit, Anthus cervinus
- Water pipit, Anthus spinoletta
- Rock pipit, Anthus petrosus
- American pipit, Anthus rubescens
- African pipit, Anthus cinnamomeus
- Buffy pipit, Anthus vaalensis
- Berthelot's pipit, Anthus berthelotii
- Golden pipit, Tmetothylacus tenellus

== Finches, euphonias, and allies ==
Order: Passeriformes Family: Fringillidae

Finches are seed-eating passerine birds, that are small to moderately large and have a strong beak, usually conical and in some species very large. All have twelve tail feathers and nine primaries. These birds have a bouncing flight with alternating bouts of flapping and gliding on closed wings, and most sing well.

- Common chaffinch, Fringilla coelebs
- Brambling, Fringilla montifringilla
- Tenerife blue chaffinch, Fringilla teydea
- Gran Canaria blue chaffinch, Fringilla polatzeki
- Black-and-yellow grosbeak, Mycerobas icterioides
- Collared grosbeak, Mycerobas affinis
- Spot-winged grosbeak, Mycerobas melanozanthos
- White-winged grosbeak, Mycerobas carnipes
- Hawfinch, Coccothraustes coccothraustes
- Evening grosbeak, Coccothraustes vespertinus
- Yellow-billed grosbeak, Eophona migratoria
- Japanese grosbeak, Eophona personata
- Common rosefinch, Carpodacus erythrinus
- Scarlet finch, Carpodacus sipahi
- Bonin grosbeak, Carpodacus ferreorostris
- Red-mantled rosefinch, Carpodacus rhodochlamys
- Blyth's rosefinch, Carpodacus grandis
- Himalayan beautiful rosefinch, Carpodacus pulcherrimus
- Chinese beautiful rosefinch, Carpodacus davidianus
- Pink-rumped rosefinch, Carpodacus waltoni
- Dark-rumped rosefinch, Carpodacus edwardsii
- Pink-browed rosefinch, Carpodacus rodochroa
- Spot-winged rosefinch, Carpodacus rhodopeplus
- Sharpe's rosefinch, Carpodacus verreauxii
- Vinaceous rosefinch, Carpodacus vinaceus
- Taiwan rosefinch, Carpodacus formosanus
- Pale rosefinch, Carpodacus synoicus
- Tibetan rosefinch, Carpodacus roborowskii
- Sillem's rosefinch, Carpodacus sillemi
- Streaked rosefinch, Carpodacus rubicilloides
- Great rosefinch, Carpodacus rubicilla
- Long-tailed rosefinch, Carpodacus sibiricus
- Red-fronted rosefinch, Carpodacus puniceus
- Crimson-browed finch, Carpodacus subhimachalus
- Pallas's rosefinch, Carpodacus roseus
- Three-banded rosefinch, Carpodacus trifasciatus
- Himalayan white-browed rosefinch, Carpodacus thura
- Chinese white-browed rosefinch, Carpodacus dubius
- Pine grosbeak, Pinicola enucleator
- Brown bullfinch, Pyrrhula nipalensis
- White-cheeked bullfinch, Pyrrhula leucogenis
- Orange bullfinch, Pyrrhula aurantiaca
- Red-headed bullfinch, Pyrrhula erythrocephala
- Gray-headed bullfinch, Pyrrhula erythaca
- Taiwan bullfinch, Pyrrhula owstoni
- Eurasian bullfinch, Pyrrhula pyrrhula
- Azores bullfinch, Pyrrhula murina
- Crimson-winged finch, Rhodopechys sanguineus
- Trumpeter finch, Bucanetes githagineus
- Mongolian finch, Bucanetes mongolicus
- Blanford's rosefinch, Agraphospiza rubescens
- Gold-naped finch, Pyrrhoplectes epauletta
- Spectacled finch, Callacanthis burtoni
- Dark-breasted rosefinch, Procarduelis nipalensis
- Plain mountain finch, Leucosticte nemoricola
- Black-headed mountain finch, Leucosticte brandti
- Asian rosy-finch, Leucosticte arctoa
- Gray-crowned rosy-finch, Leucosticte tephrocotis
- Desert finch, Rhodospiza obsoleta
- Arabian grosbeak, Rhynchostruthus percivali
- Socotra grosbeak, Rhychostruthus socotranus
- European greenfinch, Chloris chloris
- Oriental greenfinch, Chloris sinica
- Yellow-breasted greenfinch, Chloris spinoides
- Vietnamese greenfinch, Chloris monguilloti
- Black-headed greenfinch, Chloris ambigua
- Yellow-fronted canary, Crithagra mozambica
- Olive-rumped serin, Crithagra rothschildi
- Yemen serin, Crithagra menachensis
- White-rumped seedeater, Crithagra leucopygia
- Thick-billed seedeater, Crithagra burtoni
- Twite, Linaria flavirostris
- Eurasian linnet, Linaria cannabina
- Yemen linnet, Linaria yemenensis
- Common redpoll, Acanthis flammea
- Lesser redpoll, Acanthis cabaret
- Hoary redpoll, Acanthis hornemanni
- Parrot crossbill, Loxia pytyopsittacus
- Red crossbill, Loxia curvirostra
- White-winged crossbill, Loxia leucoptera
- Scottish crossbill, Loxia scotica
- Mountain serin, Chrysocorythus estherae
- European goldfinch, Carduelis carduelis
- Citril finch, Carduelis citrinella
- Corsican finch, Carduelis corsicana
- European serin, Serinus serinus
- Fire-fronted serin, Serinus pusillus
- Syrian serin, Serinus syriacus
- Tibetan serin, Spinus thibetanus
- Eurasian siskin, Spinus spinus
- Pine siskin, Spinus pinus (A)

== Longspurs and snow buntings ==
Order: Passeriformes Family: Calcariidae

The Calcariidae are a group of passerine birds which had been traditionally grouped with the New World sparrows, but differ in a number of respects and are usually found in open grassy areas.

- Lapland longspur, Calcarius lapponicus
- Snow bunting, Plectrophenax nivalis

== Old World buntings ==
Order: Passeriformes Family: Emberizidae

The emberizids are a large family of passerine birds. They are seed-eating birds with distinctively shaped bills. Many emberizid species have distinctive head patterns.

- Crested bunting, Emberiza lathami
- Black-headed bunting, Emberiza melanocephala
- Red-headed bunting, Emberiza bruniceps
- Corn bunting, Emberiza calandra
- Chestnut-eared bunting, Emberiza fucata
- Tibetan bunting, Emberiza koslowi
- Rufous-backed bunting, Emberiza jankowskii
- Rock bunting, Emberiza cia
- Godlewski's bunting, Emberiza godlewskii
- Meadow bunting, Emberiza cioides
- Cirl bunting, Emberiza cirlus
- White-capped bunting, Emberiza stewarti
- Yellowhammer, Emberiza citrinella
- Pine bunting, Emberiza leucocephalos
- Gray-necked bunting, Emberiza buchanani
- Cinereous bunting, Emberiza cineracea
- Ortolan bunting, Emberiza hortulana
- Cretzschmar's bunting, Emberiza caesia
- Striolated bunting, Emberiza striolata
- Slaty bunting, Emberiza siemsseni
- Yellow-throated bunting, Emberiza elegans
- Ochre-rumped bunting, Emberiza yessoensis
- Pallas's bunting, Emberiza pallasi
- Reed bunting, Emberiza schoeniclus
- Yellow-breasted bunting, Emberiza aureola
- Little bunting, Emberiza pusilla
- Rustic bunting, Emberiza rustica
- Yellow bunting, Emberiza sulphurata
- Black-faced bunting, Emberiza spodocephala
- Masked bunting, Emberiza personata
- Chestnut bunting, Emberiza rutila
- Yellow-browed bunting, Emberiza chrysophrys
- Tristram's bunting, Emberiza tristrami
- Gray bunting, Emberiza variabilis
- Socotra bunting, Emberiza socotrana
- Cinnamon-breasted bunting, Emberiza tahapisi
- House bunting, Emberiza sahari

== New World sparrows ==
Order: Passeriformes Family: Passerellidae

Until 2017, these species were considered part of the family Emberizidae. Most of the species are known as sparrows, but these birds are not closely related to the Old World sparrows which are in the family Passeridae. Many of these have distinctive head patterns.

- Chipping sparrow, Spizella passerina
- American tree sparrow, Spizelloides arborea (A)
- Fox sparrow, Passerella iliaca
- White-crowned sparrow, Zonotrichia leucophrys (A)
- Golden-crowned sparrow, Zonotrichia atricapilla
- White-throated sparrow, Zonotrichia albicollis
- Rufous-collared sparrow, Zonotrichia capensis
- Savannah sparrow, Passerculus sandwichensis

== Troupials and allies ==
Order: Passeriformes Family: Icteridae

The icterids are a group of small to medium-sized, often colourful, passerine birds restricted to the New World and include the grackles, New World blackbirds and New World orioles. Most species have black as the predominant plumage colour, often enlivened by yellow, orange or red.

- Rusty blackbird, Euphagus carolinus (A)

== New World warblers ==
Order: Passeriformes Family: Parulidae

The New World warblers are a group of small, often colourful, passerine birds restricted to the New World. Most are arboreal, but some are terrestrial. Most members of this family are insectivores.

- Northern waterthrush, Parkesia noveboracensis (A)

== Tanagers and allies ==
Order: Passeriformes Family: Thraupidae

The tanagers are a large group of small to medium-sized passerine birds restricted to the New World, mainly in the tropics. Many species are brightly colored. As a family they are omnivorous, but individual species specialize in eating fruits, seeds, insects, or other types of food. Most have short, rounded wings.

- Red-crested cardinal, Paroaria coronata (I)

== See also ==
- List of birds
- Lists of birds by region
