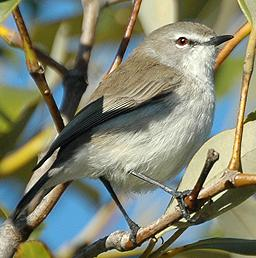

Conservation status
- Least Concern (IUCN 3.1)

Scientific classification
- Kingdom: Animalia
- Phylum: Chordata
- Class: Aves
- Order: Passeriformes
- Family: Acanthizidae
- Genus: Gerygone
- Species: G. levigaster

Binomial name
- Gerygone levigaster Gould, 1843

Subspecies
- G. l. pallida - Finsch, 1898; G. l. levigaster - Gould, 1843; G. l. cantator - (Weatherill, 1908)

= Mangrove gerygone =

Species of bird

The mangrove gerygone (Gerygone levigaster) is a species of bird in the Australian warbler family Acanthizidae. The species is also known as the mangrove warbler. The species is thought to form a superspecies with the closely related fan-tailed gerygone of Melanesia and the Australian western gerygone. There are three subspecies of mangrove gerygone, G. l. pallida, found in southern New Guinea, the nominate race G. l. levigaster, which is found from coastal Western Australia to coastal north Queensland and is known as Buff-breasted Flyeater (Ethelornis Levigaster), and G. l. cantator, which is found from coastal Queensland to New South Wales. The species is uncommon in New Guinea and has suffered some declines due to mangrove clearances but is not considered threatened by the IUCN.

The species is principally distributed in mangrove forests and in forests and woodland adjacent to mangroves. The species will move into nearby forests from mangroves to feed, particularly in the breeding season. Where its range overlaps with that of the large-billed gerygone in the Kimberley it is actually displaced from the mangroves and is instead found in scrubland dominated by paperbarks and acacia.

The mangrove gerygone is a typical member of the genus Gerygone, they are small birds with rounded wings, 9–11 cm long and weighing 6 g. The plumage is grey above with a white throat, belly, flanks and rump. There is a distinct white eye stripe. The bill and legs are black and the iris is red. The subspecies G. l. pallida is slightly browner above and G. l. cantator is slightly larger and heavier. The song, which is similar to that of the western gerygone, has been described as "sweet, rich, tuneful".

The species feeds in the foliage of trees on insects, including beetles, grasshoppers, wasps, ants and moths. It is less likely to catch prey in the air than other gerygones, but will join mixed-species feeding flocks with white-eyes, honey-eaters and fantails. The species mostly feeds in the canopy but will forage amongst the roots of mangroves.

The mangrove gerygone breeds throughout the year, although principally in spring-summer in the east of Australia and during the dry season in the north. The female builds the oval domed nest. It is constructed out of roots, grass, spider webs, moss, seaweed and bark, and hangs from mangroves. Two to three eggs, are laid in the nest and are incubated for 14–17 days. Both parents feed the chick for another 14–17 days. A number of cuckoo species are brood parasites of this species.
