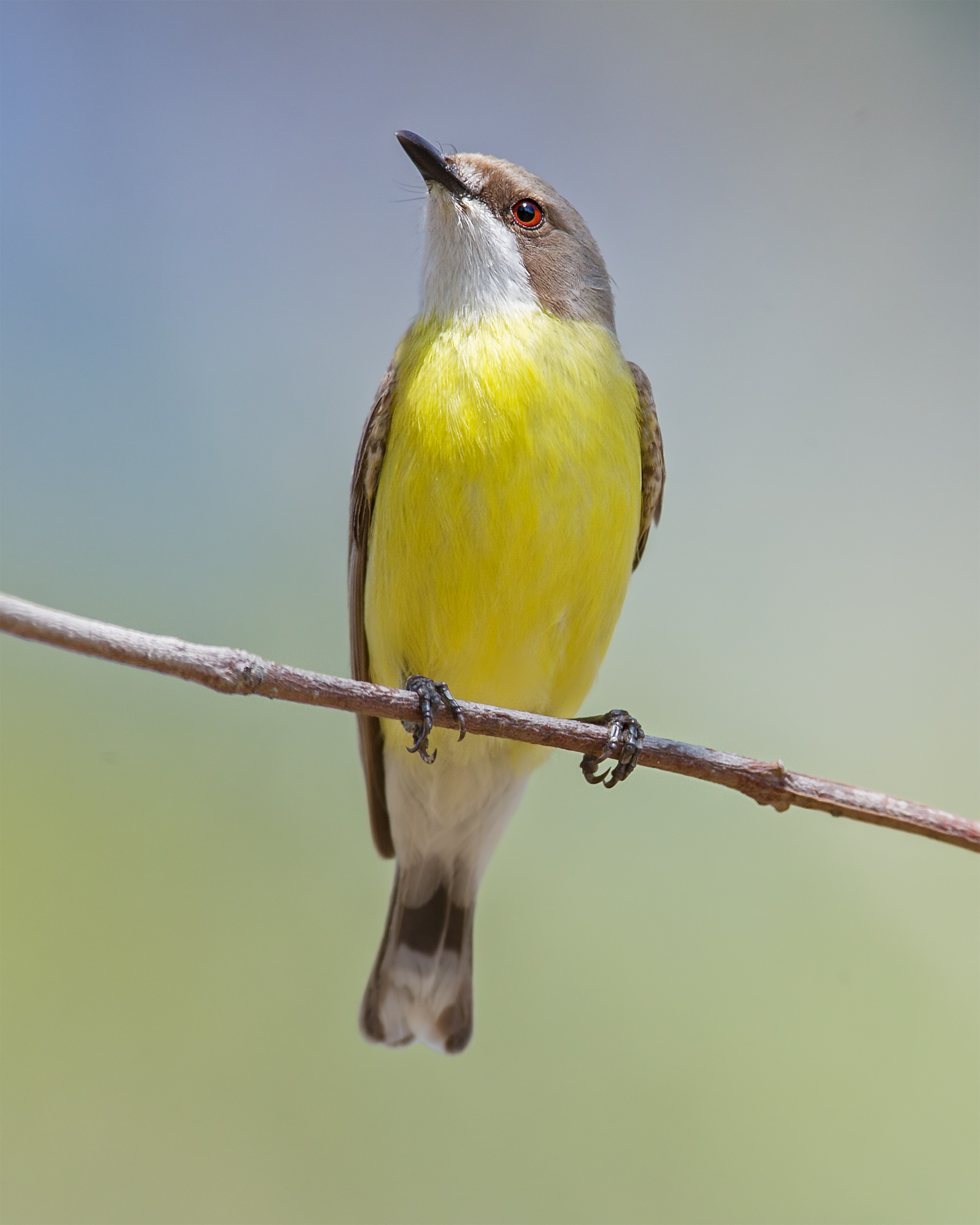

Conservation status
- Least Concern (IUCN 3.1)

Scientific classification
- Kingdom: Animalia
- Phylum: Chordata
- Class: Aves
- Order: Passeriformes
- Family: Acanthizidae
- Genus: Gerygone
- Species: G. olivacea

Binomial name
- Gerygone olivacea (Gould, 1838)

Subspecies
- G. o. cinerascens - Sharpe, 1878; G. o. rogersi - Mathews, 1911; G. o. olivacea - (Gould, 1838)
- Range of the white-throated gerygone

Synonyms
- Gerygone albogularis - Gould, 1841; Psilopus albogularis - Gould, 1838; Psilopus olivaceus - Gould, 1838

= White-throated gerygone =

Species of bird

The white-throated gerygone (Gerygone olivacea) is a species of bird in the Australasian warbler family, Acanthizidae. It is found in Australia and south-eastern Papua New Guinea. Its natural habitats are temperate forests and subtropical or tropical moist lowland forests. Other common names include white-throated warbler, white-throated flyeater, bush canary, and native canary.

== Taxonomy and Systematics ==
Originally described as the type species for the genus Psilopus, it was moved into the newly erected Gerygone genus three years later. Gerygone comes from the Greek word "gērugonos" meaning "echoes". The species name olivacea is latin for 'olive-green', given for its underbelly coloration.

Its sister species is the plain gerygone (Gerygone inornata), as determined by DNA analysis.

There are three recognized subspecies of G. olivacea: Gerygone olivacea ssp. cinerascens, Gerygone olivacea ssp. rogersi, and Gerygone olivacea ssp. olivacea.

While Gerygone albogularis was historically the more widely used name, the ICZN has determined it to be a junior synonym of Gerygone olivacea.

== Description ==
Adults have a red eye, a white spot on their forehead, and a white throat. The nominate subspecies upperparts are a greyish brown and underparts are bright yellow. The undertail coverts are white. The tail is dark, contrasted by white spotting and white tips. Males and females are alike. Juveniles have darkened eyes and a mostly yellow throat and underparts, with less defined white tones. It varies in size from 9-11.5cm and weights an average of 7g.

The subspecies differ in size and plumage:

- G. o. cinerascens is grayer above, narrower tail spots and slightly smaller
- G. o. rogersi is slightly paler above and brighter below, with less tail spots and overall smaller in size.
- G. o. olivacea is as described above

== Distribution and habitat ==
It is found along the northern and eastern Australia, as well as the Port Moresby area and Gulf of Papua in Papua New Guinea. Each subspecies has a separate range with some overlap:

- G. o. cinerascens inhabits Papua New Guinea in the Port Moresby area and Gulf of Papua, as well as the north and central portions of the Cape York Peninsula
- G. o. rogersi inhabits north-western Australia from Roebuck Bay to south-eastern Gulf of Carpentaria
- G. o. olivacea inhabits Eastern and southern Australia from the south of Cape York peninsula to the southern end of Victoria

The white throated gerygone is generally resident over much of its range, but many southern breeders will move north after the breeding season, returning in August-November. It has been recorded as a vagrant in Tasmania.

Within its Australian range, the white-throated gerygone is found in open dry eucalyptus woodland and dense riparian vegetation, from the coast until ~1500m. It occupies tropical, subtropical, and temperate zones. Less commonly, it may occur in remnant woods in farmland and gardens. In Papua New Guinea, they may be found in eucalyptus savannahs and Melaleuca (paperbark) forests from the coast to 650 m.

== Ecology and Behaviour ==
=== Diet and Foraging ===
Like other gerygones, they are mainly insectivorous, consuming a variety of insect prey including moths, flies, beetles and wasps. They forage singly, in small groups, in mixed species feeding flocks. Foraging is done mainly in the canopy by sallying and hovering, but may also occur on the ground.

=== Vocalizations ===
The song functions as both a territorial and mating signal, given year round but more often in the spring. The song differs across populations. G. o. cinerascens in New Guinea has a high-pitched, descending trill. Birds of races olivacea and rogersi have an even-pitched whistle or a descending trill with an introductory double note. Their song may be confused with the western gerygone (Gerygone fusca) where they overlap, but is stronger. The call is a low pitched chirp.

=== Breeding and Nesting ===
Their nesting season spans from August to January, but may extend into March-May. They have one brood per season. Two to three pale pink eggs with reddish purple spots are layed and incubated for roughly 18 days. The nest is domed and oval shaped with a hooded, side-facing entrance. It is constructed using bark fragments held together using spider silk and lined with feathers and fibres. The young remain in the nest for 15-17 days.

== Conservation ==
With a large range and relatively stable population, the white-throated gerygone has been evaluated as least concern but decreasing by the IUCN, last assesed on June 5, 2025. However, the Papua New Guinea population is restricted to a small region of savannah that may be at risk of clearing, fires and human encroachment.

== Gallery ==
Gerygones nesting in Bougainvillea, rural New South Wales garden

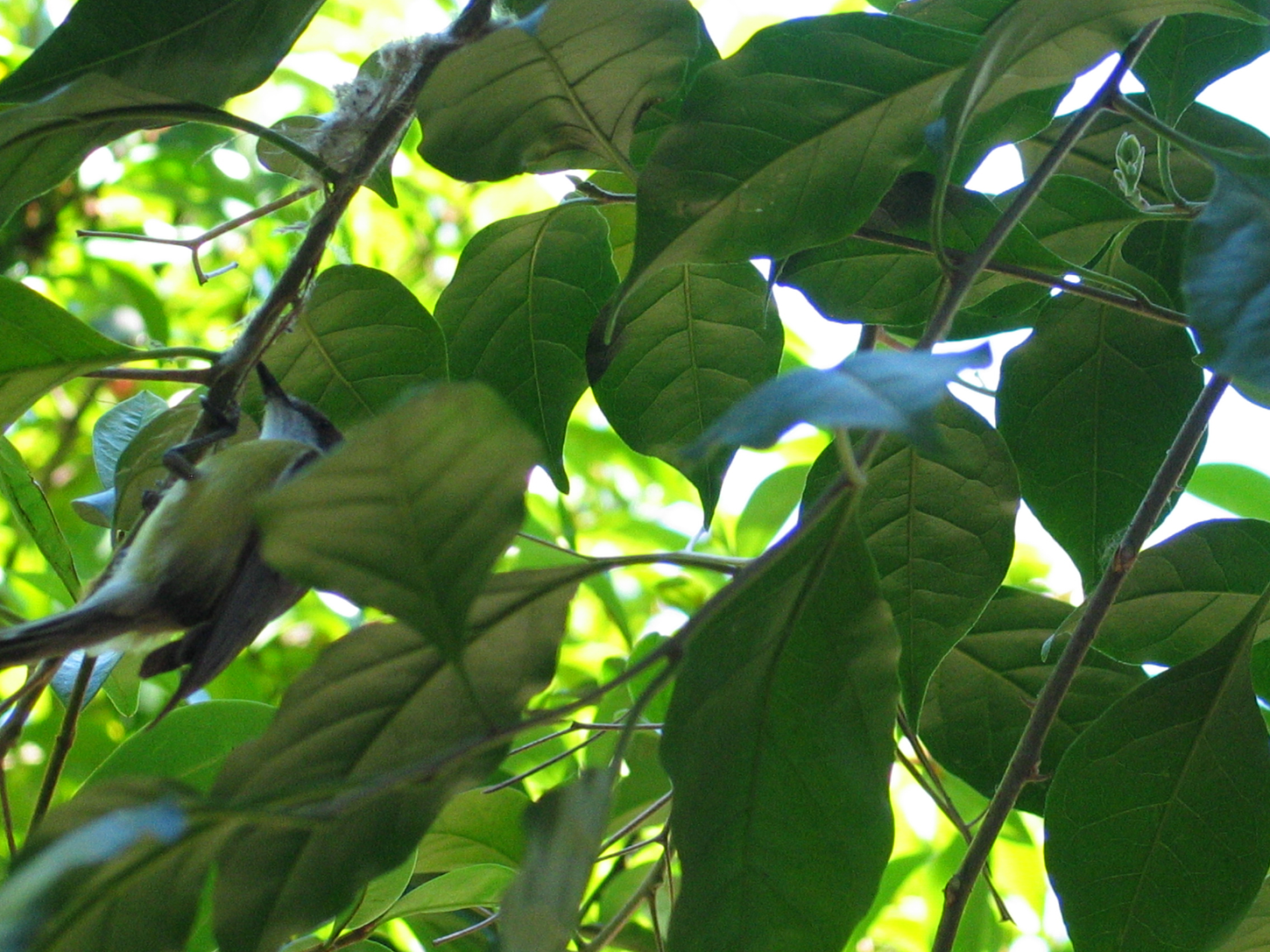
Fig 1. The bird(s) wound sticky threads around a Bougainvillea stem.
These threads appeared to be spider web.

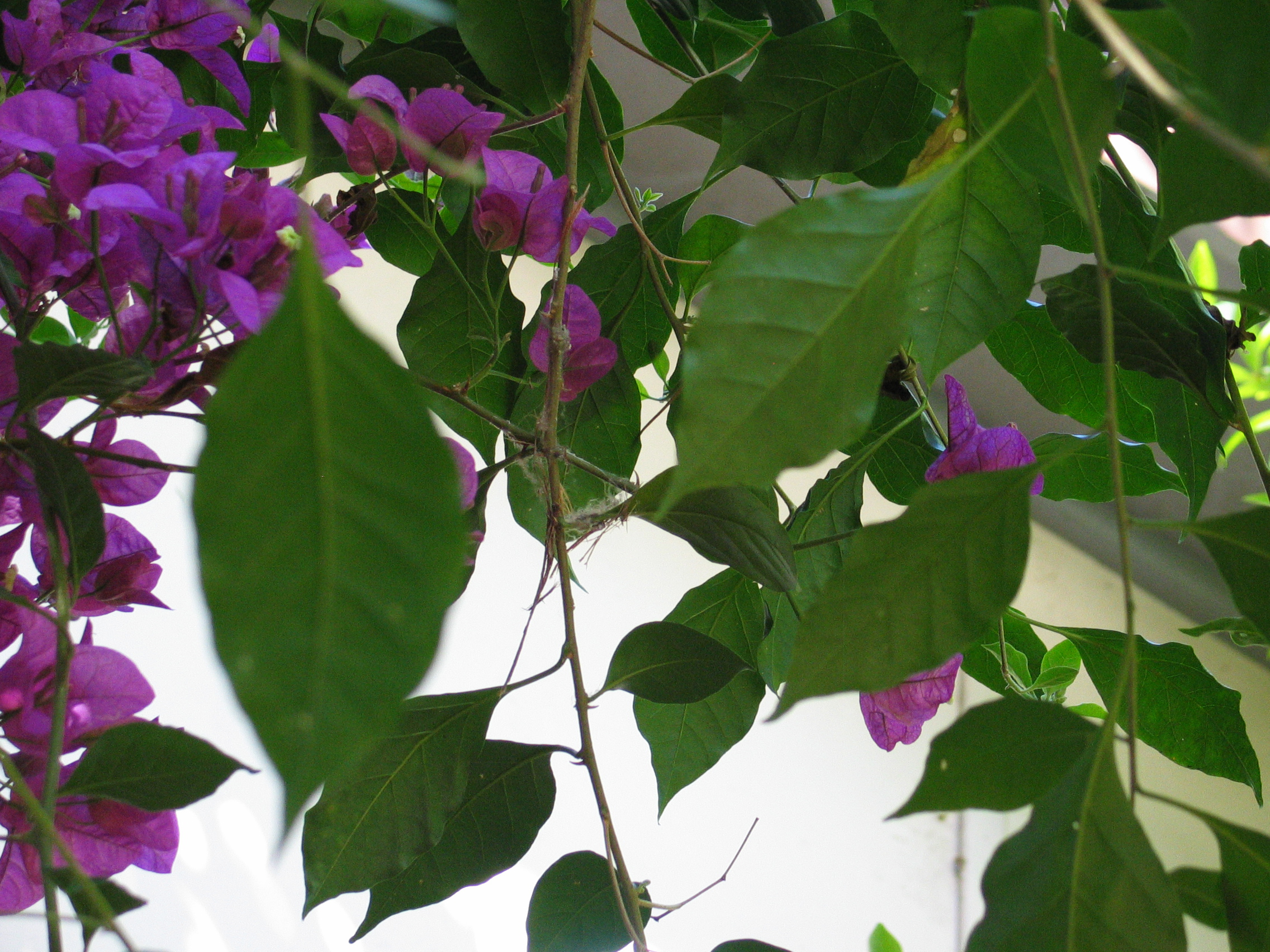
Fig 2. The nest was located in among the Bougainvillea foliage.
Both sexes seemed to help build it.

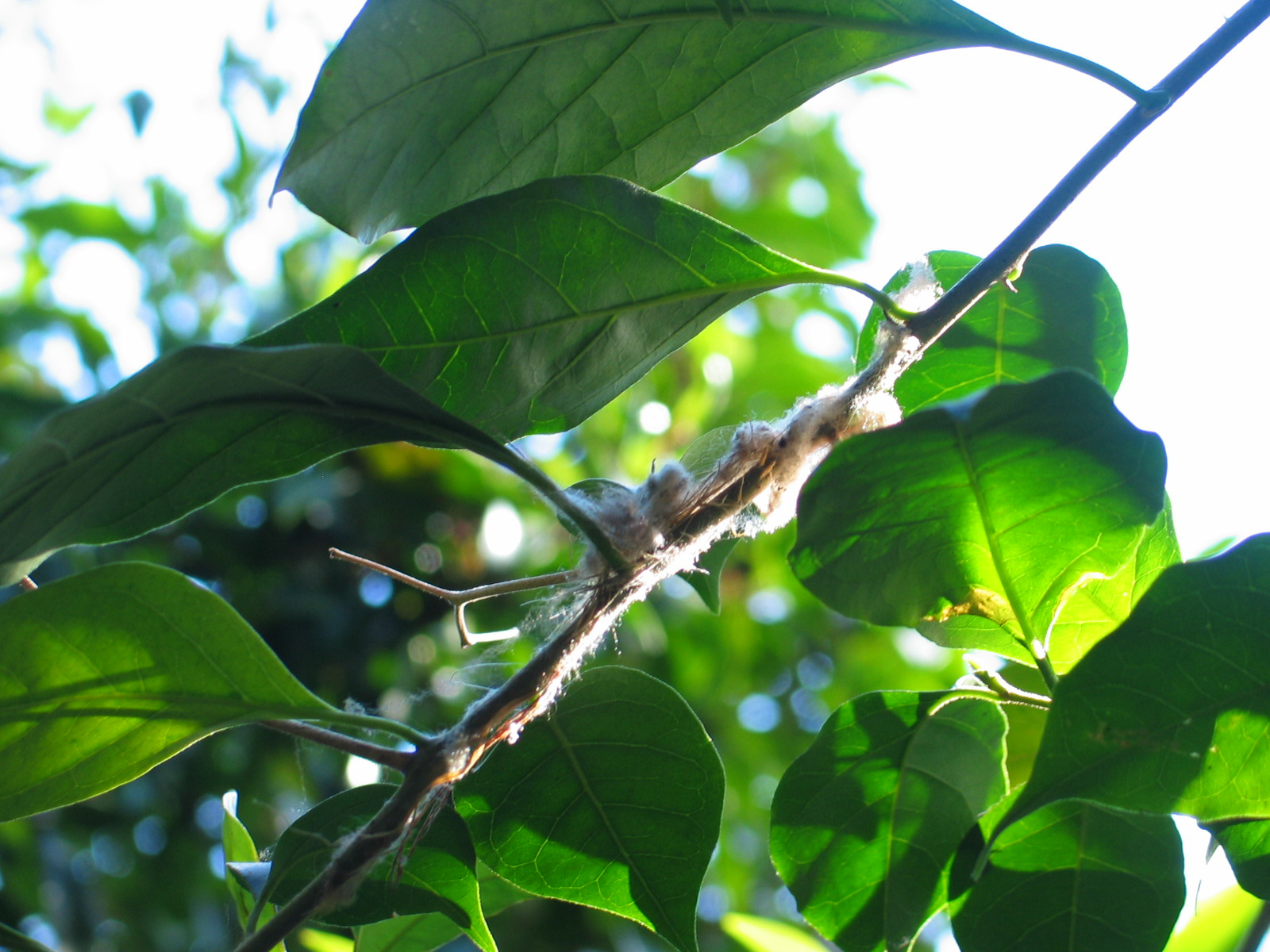
Fig 3. Other material was then stuck to the sticky foundation. The birds did not work on the nest every day.

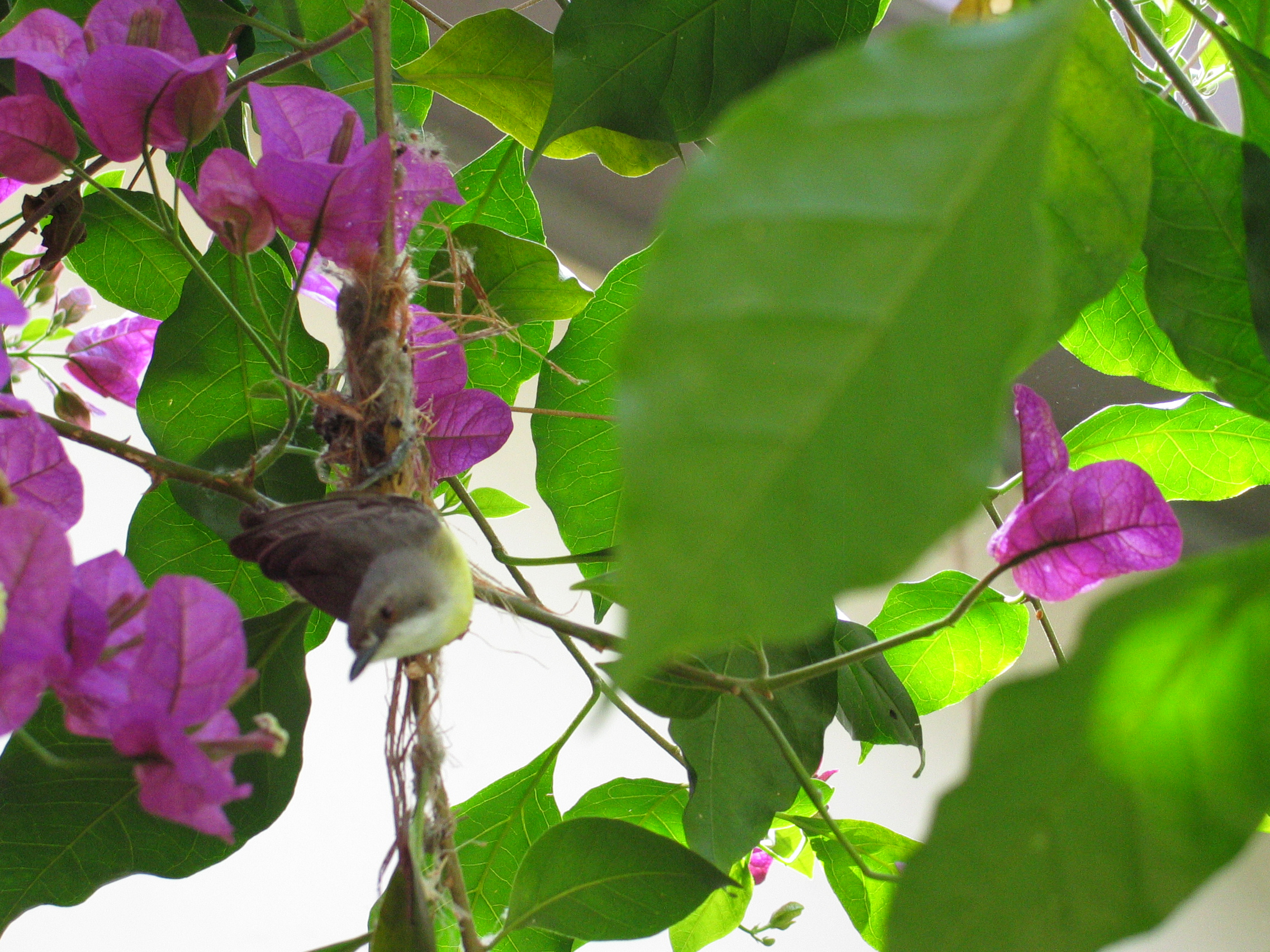
Fig 4. The weight of the nesting material and the gerygones
gradually bent the branch vertical.

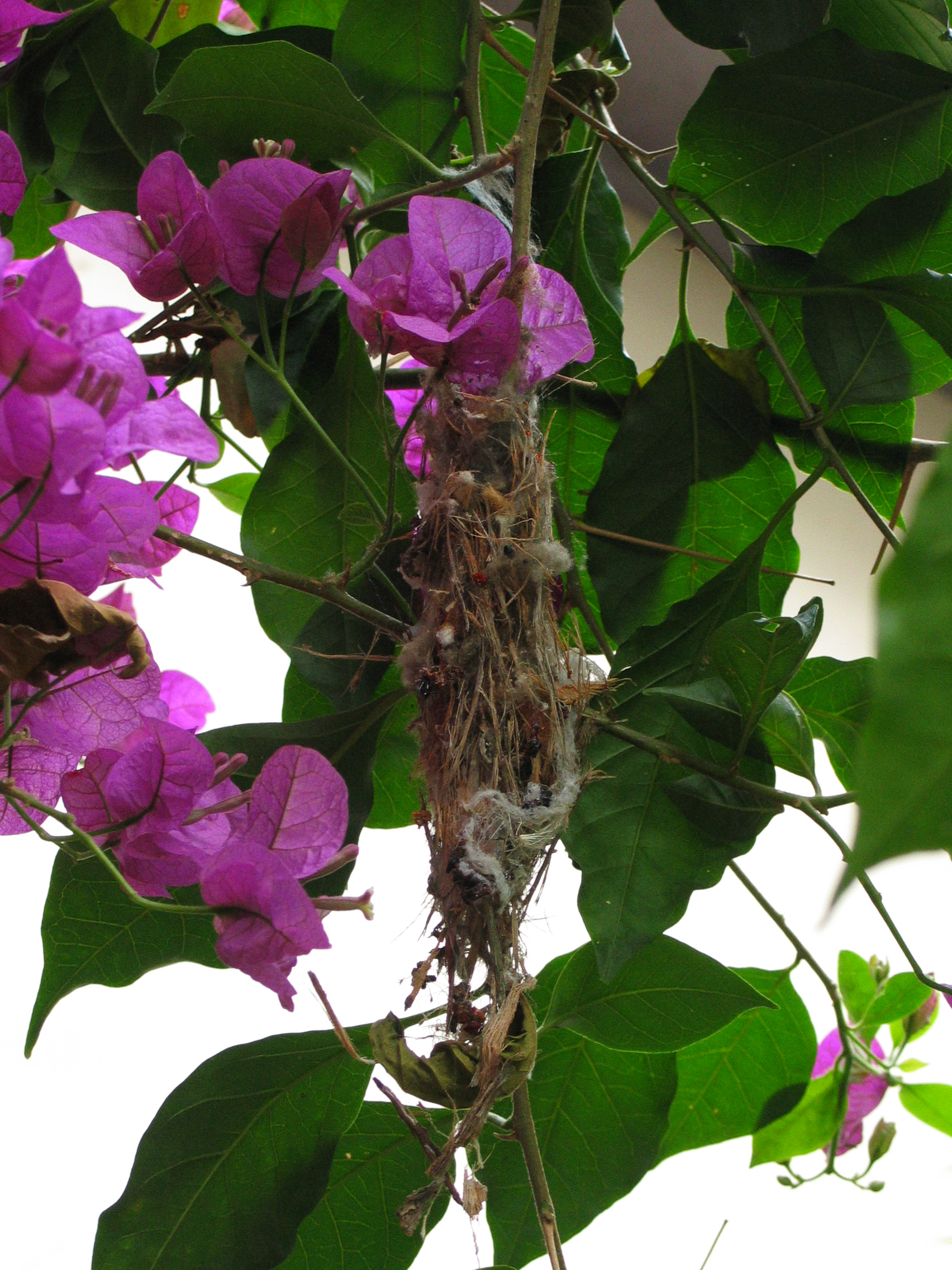
Fig 5. The nest took several weeks to build.
It was made from strips of bark, twigs,
animal fur, and manufactured fibres.

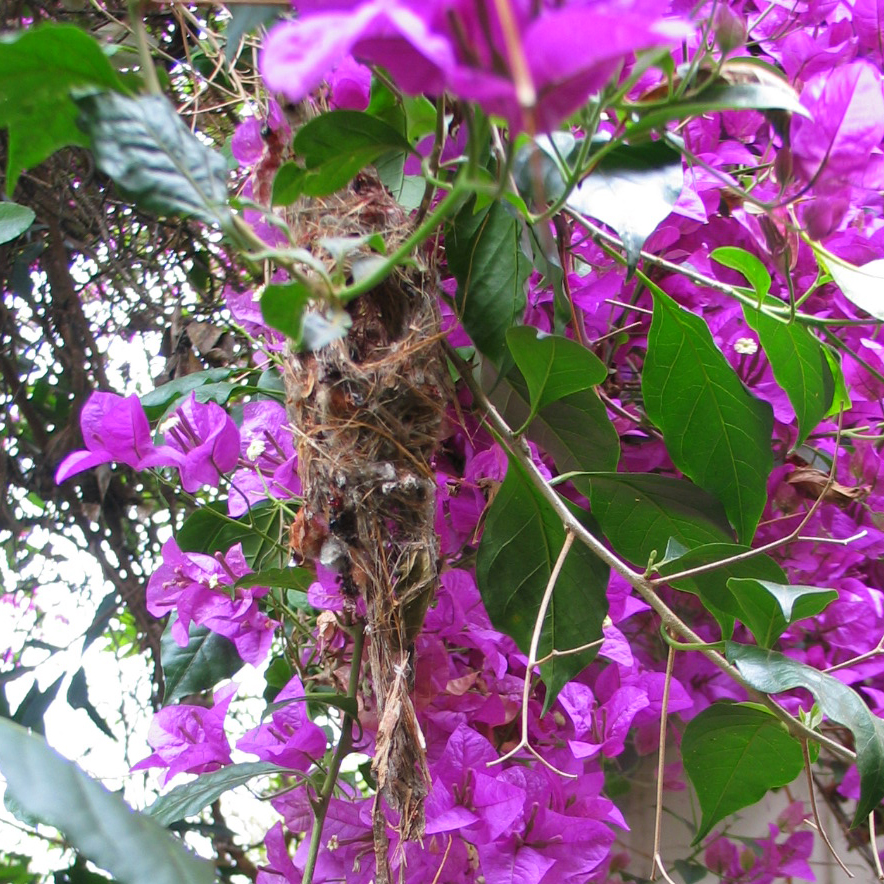
Fig 6. This view shows the circular entry to the nest.

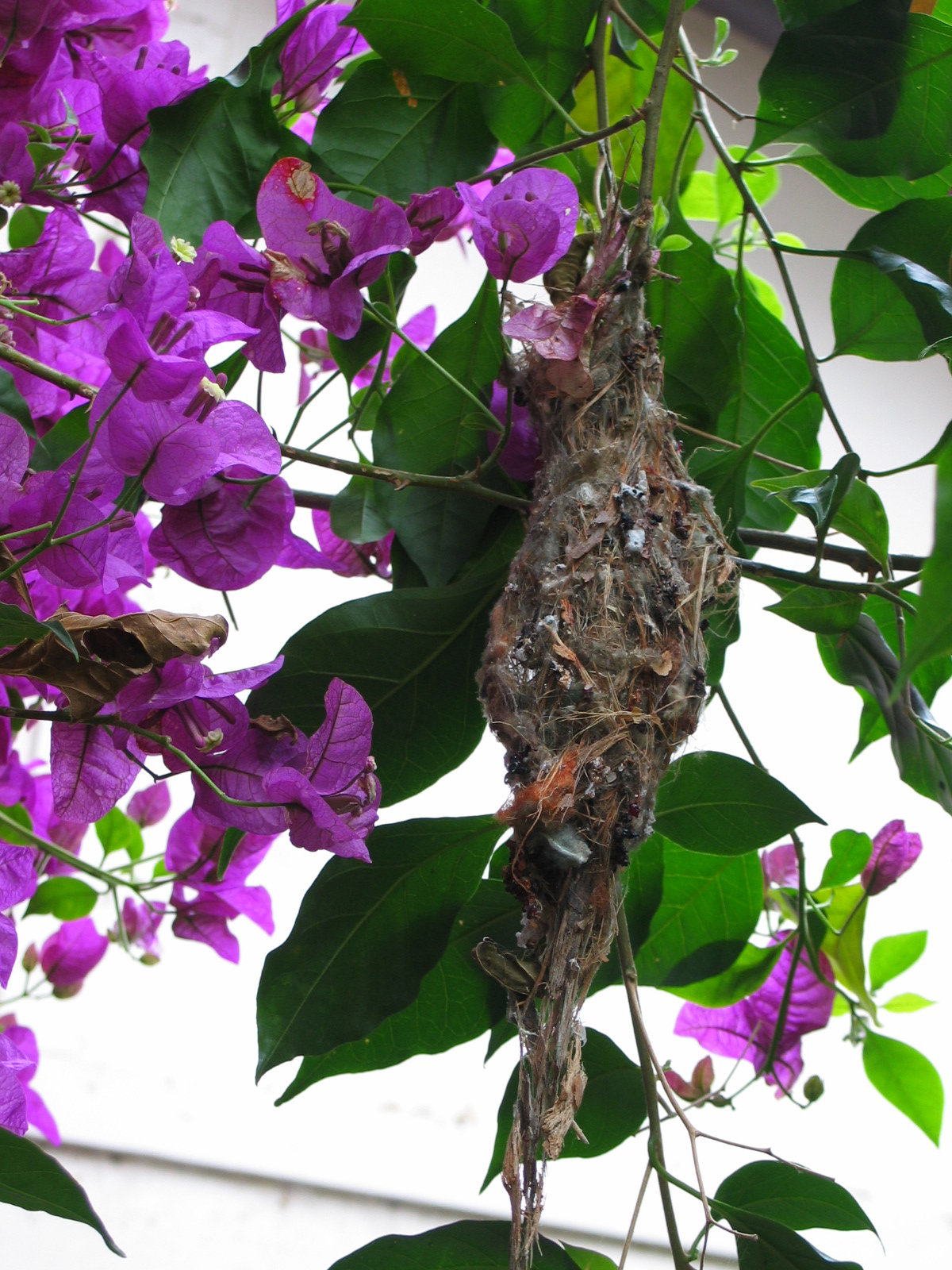
Fig 7. This view shows the rear of the nest.

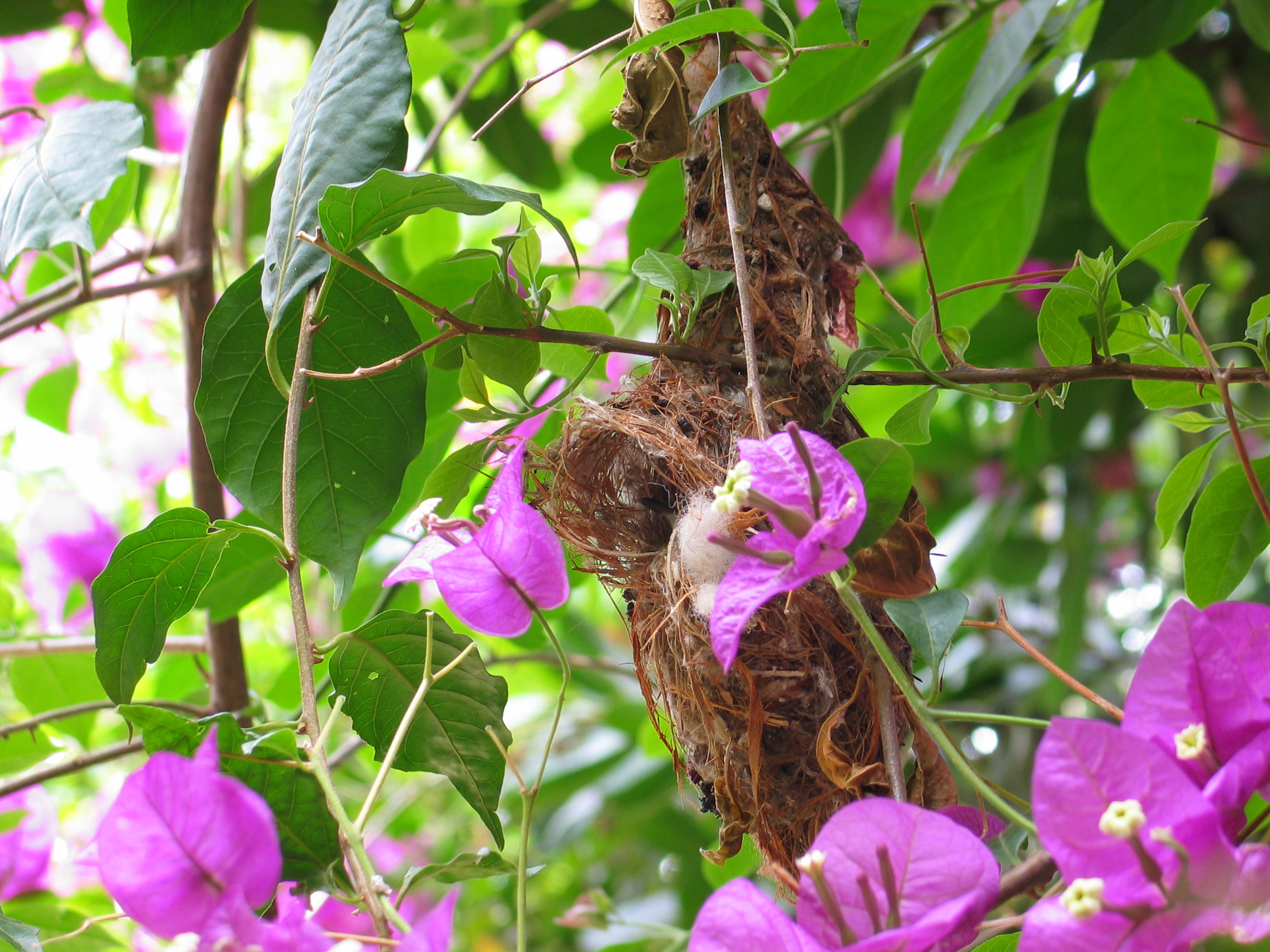
Fig 8. The gerygones abandoned the nest soon after completion.
It may have been a decoy nest.
