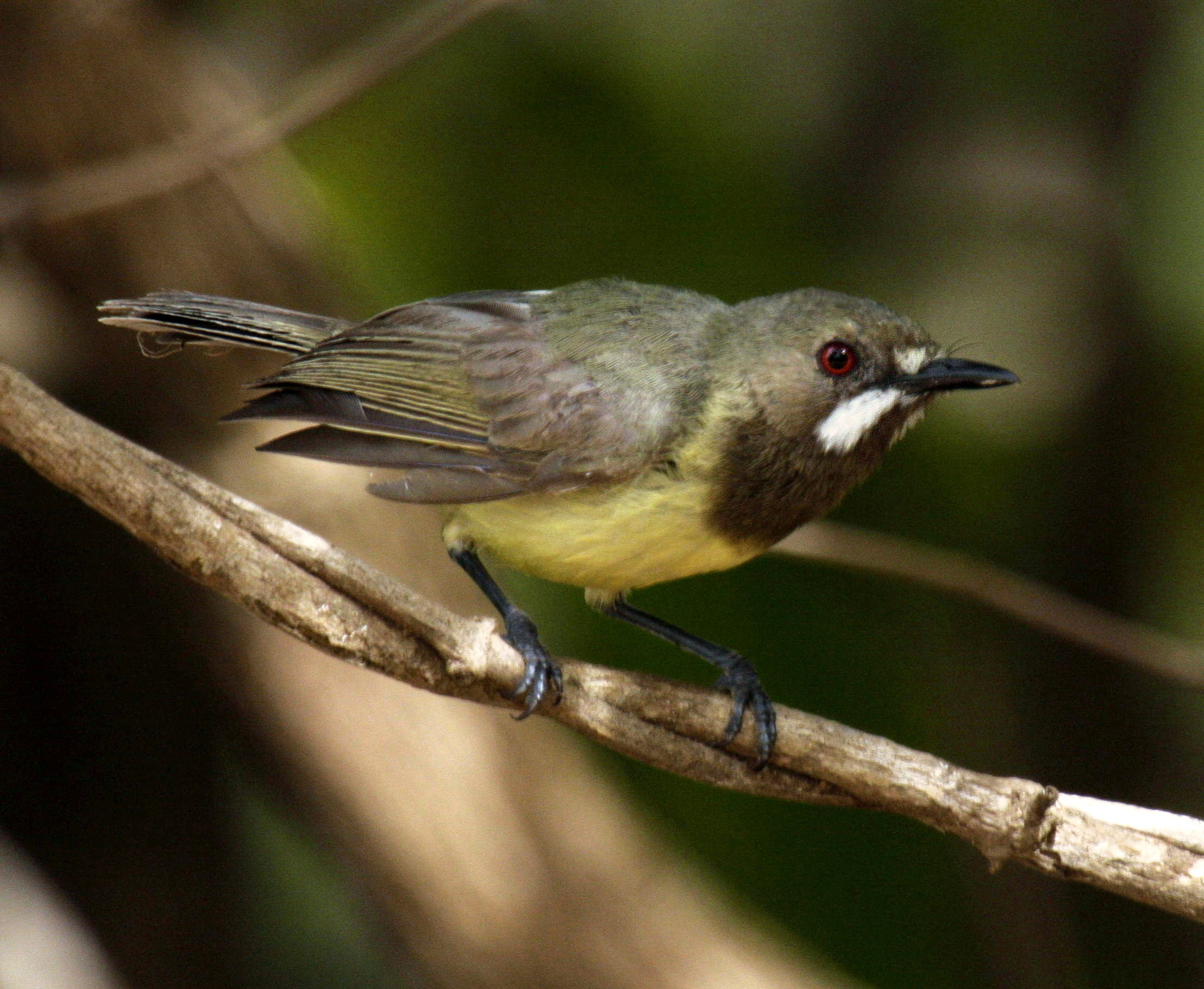

Conservation status
- Least Concern (IUCN 3.1)

Scientific classification
- Kingdom: Animalia
- Phylum: Chordata
- Class: Aves
- Order: Passeriformes
- Family: Acanthizidae
- Genus: Gerygone
- Species: G. palpebrosa

Binomial name
- Gerygone palpebrosa Wallace, 1865

Synonyms
- Pseudogerygone palpebrosa

= Fairy gerygone =

Species of bird

The fairy gerygone (Gerygone palpebrosa), previously known as the fairy warbler, is a species of bird in the family Acanthizidae native to New Guinea and Queensland, Australia.

== Taxonomy ==
Alfred Russel Wallace described the species as Gerygone palpebrosa in 1865, from a specimen from the Aru Islands. The species name is derived from the Latin palpebra "eyelid", for the bird's facial markings. A taxon known commonly as the fairy warbler, Gerygone flavida was described from the Herbert River in Queensland and initially treated as a separate species. However, birds further north along the Queensland coastline became gradually more like Gerygone palpebrosa, indicating there was no delineation between the two forms. This and the similarity of their songs indicated they were a single species.

Other common names recorded include black-throated, black-headed or masked gerygone, warbler or flyeater, hornet-nest bird, from a propensity to nest near wasp nests. These names were applied to what was thought a separate species—Gerygone personata described by John Gould in 1866—from far north Queensland which has been sunk into this one. What was described as Gerygone flavida was given the names yellow warbler/gerygone/flyeater, Cardwell gerygone or Herbert River flyeater.

Genetic study indicates that the fairy gerygone is most closely related to the green-backed gerygone (Gerygone chloronota), their ancestors having diverged around two million years ago.

Six subspecies are recognised:

- G. p. palpebrosa from southwestern New Guinea and Aru Islands
- G. p. wahnesi from northern New Guinea and Wapen Island
- G. p. inconspicua from southeastern New Guinea
- G. p. tarara from southern New Guinea
- G. p. personata from north Queensland (Cape York Peninsula), Australia
- G. p. flavida from central Queensland, Australia

== Description ==
Adult birds have olive upperparts and yellow underparts, brownish tails, short black bills and legs, and red eyes. The male has a black throat. The subspecies flavida can be distinguished from subspecies personata by the white tip of its tail.

== Distribution and habitat ==
It is found in Australia, Indonesia, and Papua New Guinea. Its natural habitats are subtropical or tropical moist lowland forests and subtropical or tropical mangrove forests.

The fairy gerygone is listed by the IUCN as being of Least Concern. No particular threats have been identified and the bird has a wide range and stable population.

== Behaviour ==
Male fairy gerygones hold themselves erect and sing a loud melodious song when they hear the calls of predators, particularly their main predator the black butcherbird. The purpose for this is unclear, though it is possibly a form of advertising to potential mates, promoting the male's prowess at singing in times of danger.

The fairy gerygone nests near wasp nests, possibly to keep itself safe from predators.

== Gallery ==
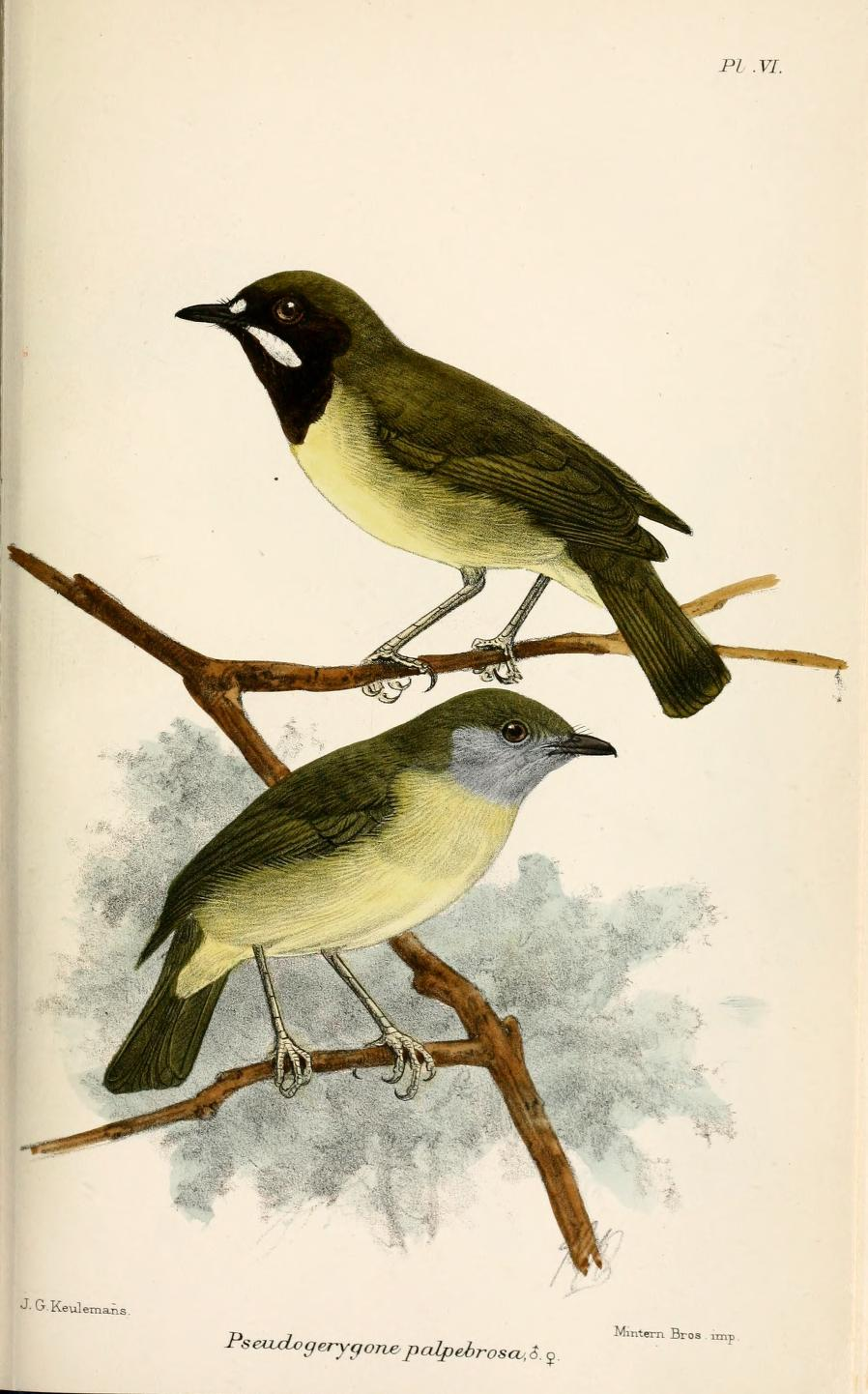
Male (above), and female (below)

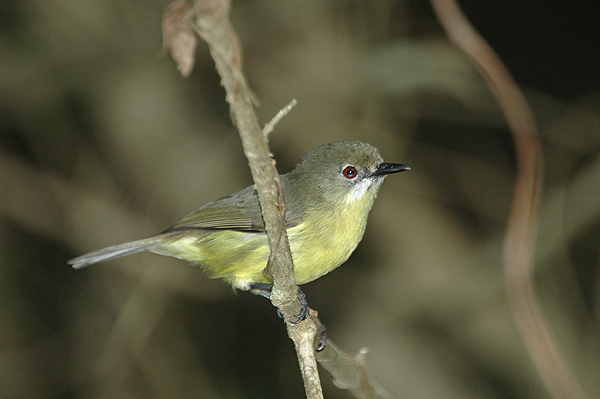
Adult female
