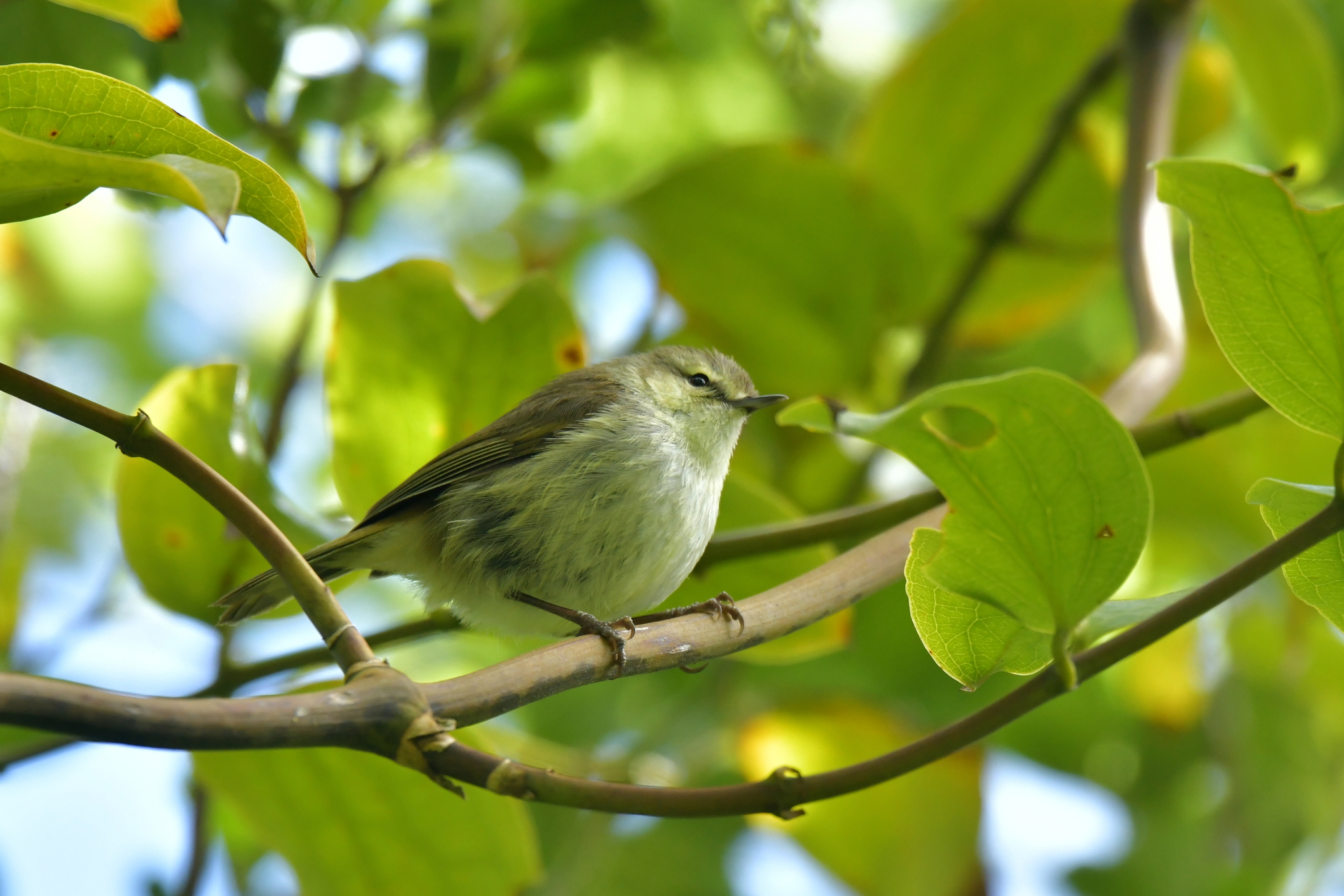

Conservation status
- Least Concern (IUCN 3.1)

Scientific classification
- Kingdom: Animalia
- Phylum: Chordata
- Class: Aves
- Order: Passeriformes
- Family: Acanthizidae
- Genus: Gerygone
- Species: G. albofrontata

Binomial name
- Gerygone albofrontata Gray, GR, 1845
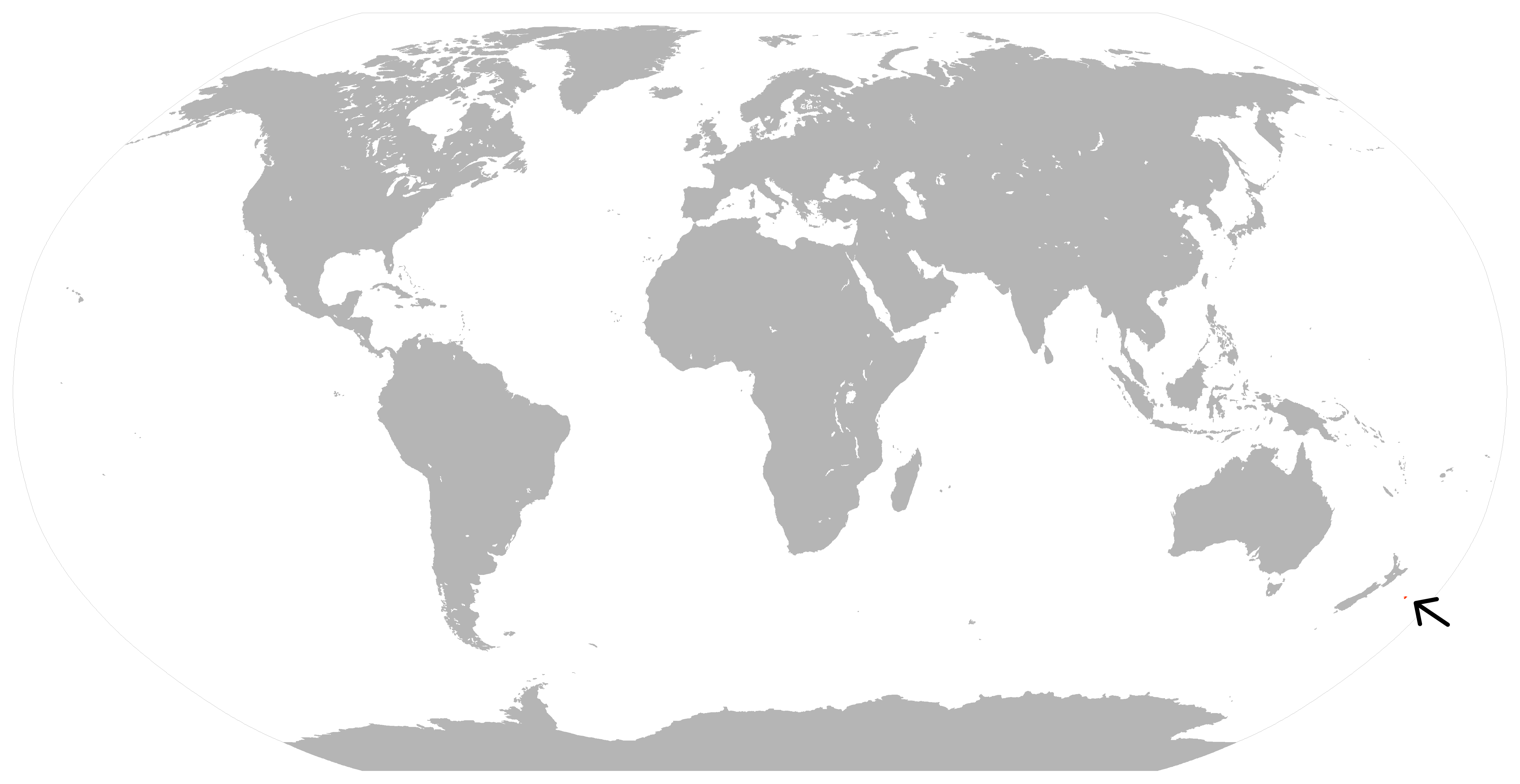

= Chatham Islands gerygone =

Species of bird

The Chatham Islands gerygone (Gerygone albofrontata), also known as the Chatham gerygone or Chatham Island warbler, is a species of bird in the family Acanthizidae. It is endemic to the Chatham Islands. The Chatham Islands gerygone is larger than and differs in plumage from the related grey warbler of mainland New Zealand. Both warblers were discovered and named by G. R. Gray in 1845. The grey and Chatham Island warblers are the only two members of the Australasian family Acanthizidae found in New Zealand.

== Description ==
The Chatham Islands gerygone has a plain olive-brown head and upperparts, with off-white underparts interrupted by pale yellow flanks and undertail. The male warbler has a distinctive white forehead, eyebrows, throat and underparts. The female warbler lacks these white areas, instead showing dull greyish-white underparts and yellow eyebrows, cheek and throat. Both adults have red eyes. This species of warbler also shows variation in the plumage of the juvenile bird. More akin to the female colouration, the juveniles have olive-grey upperparts and more yellow through their underparts, with brown eyes.

Adult Chatham Islands gerygones of both sexes are about 12 cm (4.7 in) long, but the male slightly outweighs the female adult, with average weights of 10 g (0.35 oz) and 8.5 g (0.30 oz) respectively.

The call of the Chatham Islands gerygone is delicate and intricate. The bird song is said to be similar to that heard from grey warblers that haven't graduated into full song, with initial phrases of four notes recurring throughout the tune. This distinctive call was said to be used by Māori to act as a reminder for when the time came to plant their crops.

== Distribution ==
Its natural habitat is temperate forests. Widespread in the southern forest of the main Chatham Island, the warblers are also seen on surrounding islands such as Pitt Island, Little Mangere Island, Star Keys, and Rangatira. Habitat loss and predators are the main causes for the northern boundary seen on the main island.

== Behaviour and ecology ==
The Chatham Islands gerygone's diet consists of small insects such as caterpillars, flies and beetles, and spiders. They feed mainly in the canopy, taking insects from leaves and tree branch crevices, and are also seen to browse the leaf litter. Unlike the grey warbler, the Chatham Islands gerygone does not hover to collect insects.

Chatham Islands gerygones are known to occasionally have their nests parasitized by Shining Bronze-cuckoos (Chrysococcyx lucidus). The cuckoo lays an egg in a nest, and hatching first the chick consequently pushes the warbler eggs out of the nest. The cuckoo chick is then fed and raised by the adult warblers.

Other threats include rats, cats, and most significantly, habitat reduction.

== Breeding ==
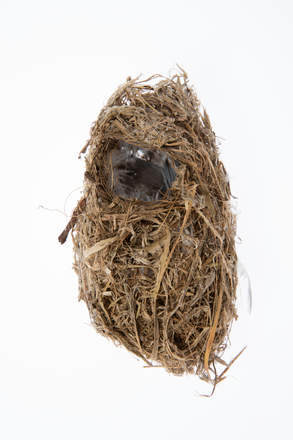
Chatham Islands gerygone nest from the collection of Auckland Museum

Chatham Islands gerygones are solitary nesters, with defined territories defended against conspecifics. Disputes are mainly carried out by the male birds, and you can observe long chases occurring when boundaries are threatened. Although very territorial, boundary disputes never result in contact. The warblers are monogamous and the same breeding territories have been known to be defended for up to three years in a row.

The breeding season for these warblers varies from year to year, but can be seen to average from around September to January. The nest style produced is the enclosed pendant, very similar to that of the grey warbler. The female birds are the sole nest builders, and incorporate mosses, lichens, leaves, bark, feathers, small twigs and spider webs into the nests. The nests are also seen to be lined with soft feathers. The location of the nests differs depending on the island. Nests on the largest island tend to be hanging freely in the open and in gaps of vegetation, while nests on the surrounding islands are in dense foliage.

The female is in charge of brooding, and her eggs are an off-white colour flecked with reddish brown. On hatching, both male and female contribute by feeding the chicks. The Chatham Islands gerygone has a high breeding success rate of 87%, significantly higher than the mainland grey warbler which sees only 38% breeding success.

== Status and conservation ==
Thriving in predator-free habitats, the adult warbler population is estimated at 5000 birds. Although thought to be decreasing, the population numbers have not yet reduced enough to be classified as vulnerable by the IUCN and it is thus categorised as "least concern" on the red list of threatened species.

Although this is the case, a recovery plan has been in place in New Zealand due to habitat loss. Main efforts have involved restoring the warblers to the northern sites of Chatham Island, and reforestation to provide future habitats for the population. Control of pests such as cats and weka have also been a focus, although the canopy dwelling birds aren't often affected by these.
