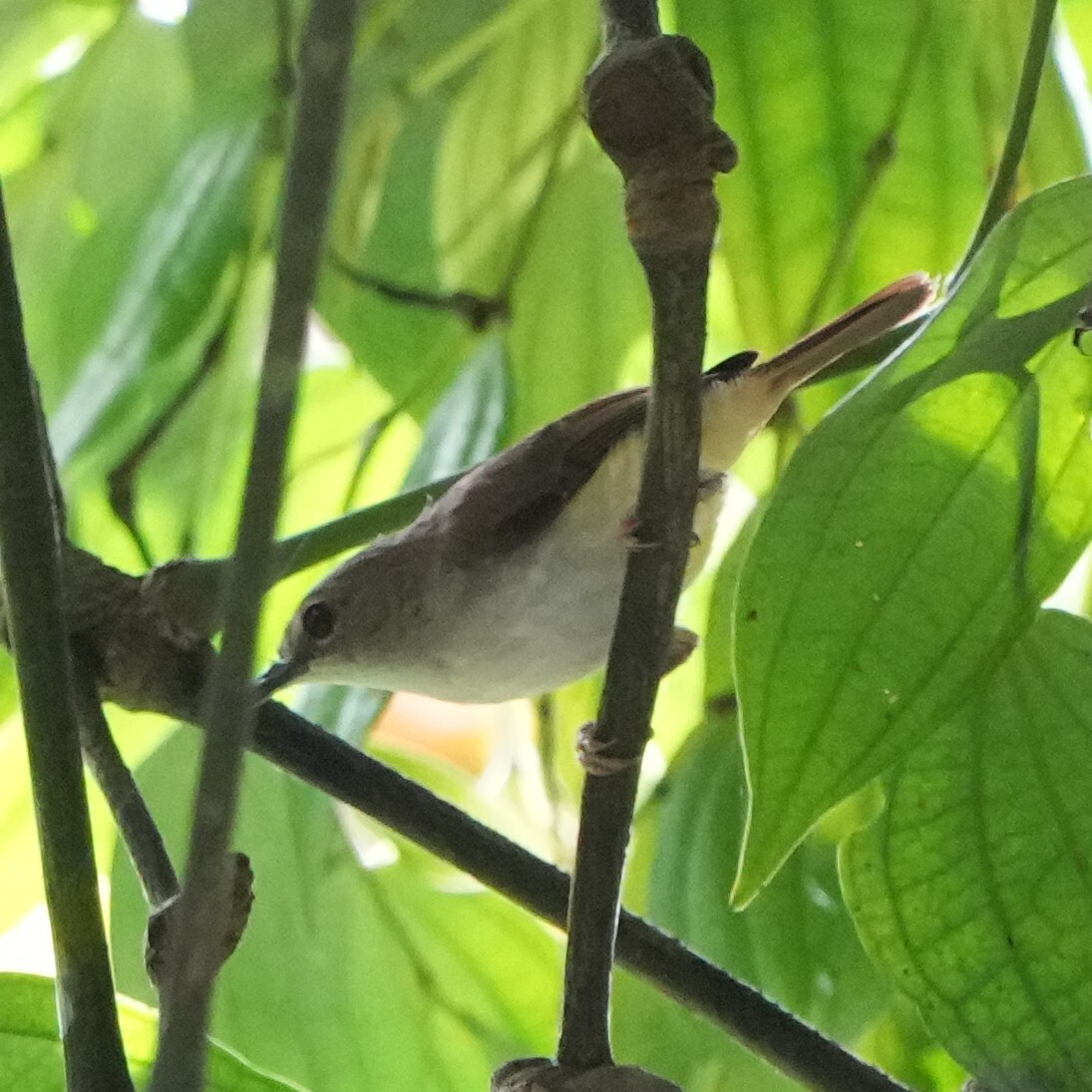

Conservation status
- Least Concern (IUCN 3.1)

Scientific classification
- Kingdom: Animalia
- Phylum: Chordata
- Class: Aves
- Order: Passeriformes
- Family: Acanthizidae
- Genus: Gerygone
- Species: G. chrysogaster

Binomial name
- Gerygone chrysogaster Gray, 1858

Subspecies
- Gerygone chrysogaster neglecta - Wallace, 1865; Gerygone chrysogaster notata - Salvadori, 1878; Gerygone chrysogaster chrysogaster - Gray, GR, 1858

= Yellow-bellied gerygone =

Species of bird

The yellow-bellied gerygone (Gerygone chrysogaster) is a species of bird in the family Acanthizidae. The Yellow-Bellied Gerygone is native to New Guinea, typically found in subtropical or tropical moist lowlands forest. Shown to have least concern about population with it being very common, but is currently decreasing in population throughout New Guinea. The population as a whole is still unknown.

== Location ==
The Yellow-Bellied Gerygone is widespread throughout New Guinea, including Aru Island, Yapen Island, and West Papuan Island. They like moist environments so therefore, they will forage in lowlands and forest. Usually the Yellow-Bellied Gerygone don’t migrate during seasonal change, but rarely will migrate 760 miles in hill forest to Tabubil, New Guinea.

== Identification ==
The Yellow-Bellied Gerygone is 10cm with brownish-olive color with a white belly. The male and female are identical and would need proper hands on examination when identifying the sex. During the breeding season, typically August-September and February- May, the females have a poor clutch size with the record being 3 eggs.The yellow-bellied gerygone also has a life span going up to almost three years.

== Taxonomy ==
The Yellow-Bellied Gerygone was first named Gerygone Chrystogaster, in Greek khrusos means gold and gaster/gastros meaning belly. There are about 3 subspecies under Gerygone Chrysogaster, all three living in New Guinea that being, Notata, neglecta, and chrysogaster. George Robert Gray who was a part of the Zoological Society of London described and named the yellow-bellied gerygone in 1858. The gerygone chrysogaster neglecta was founded by Alfred Russel Wallace in 1865, thirteen years later in 1878 the gerygone chrysogaster Notata was named by Italian zoologist Tommaso Salvadori.

== Diet and foraging ==
Yellow-Bellied Gerygone sing in small groups up to five birds and they forage together. These birds are insectivorous and have we no information about them being prey. As well as these birds being highly active, they are often found in mixed-species flocks, searching mostly on lower sections of trees for food.
