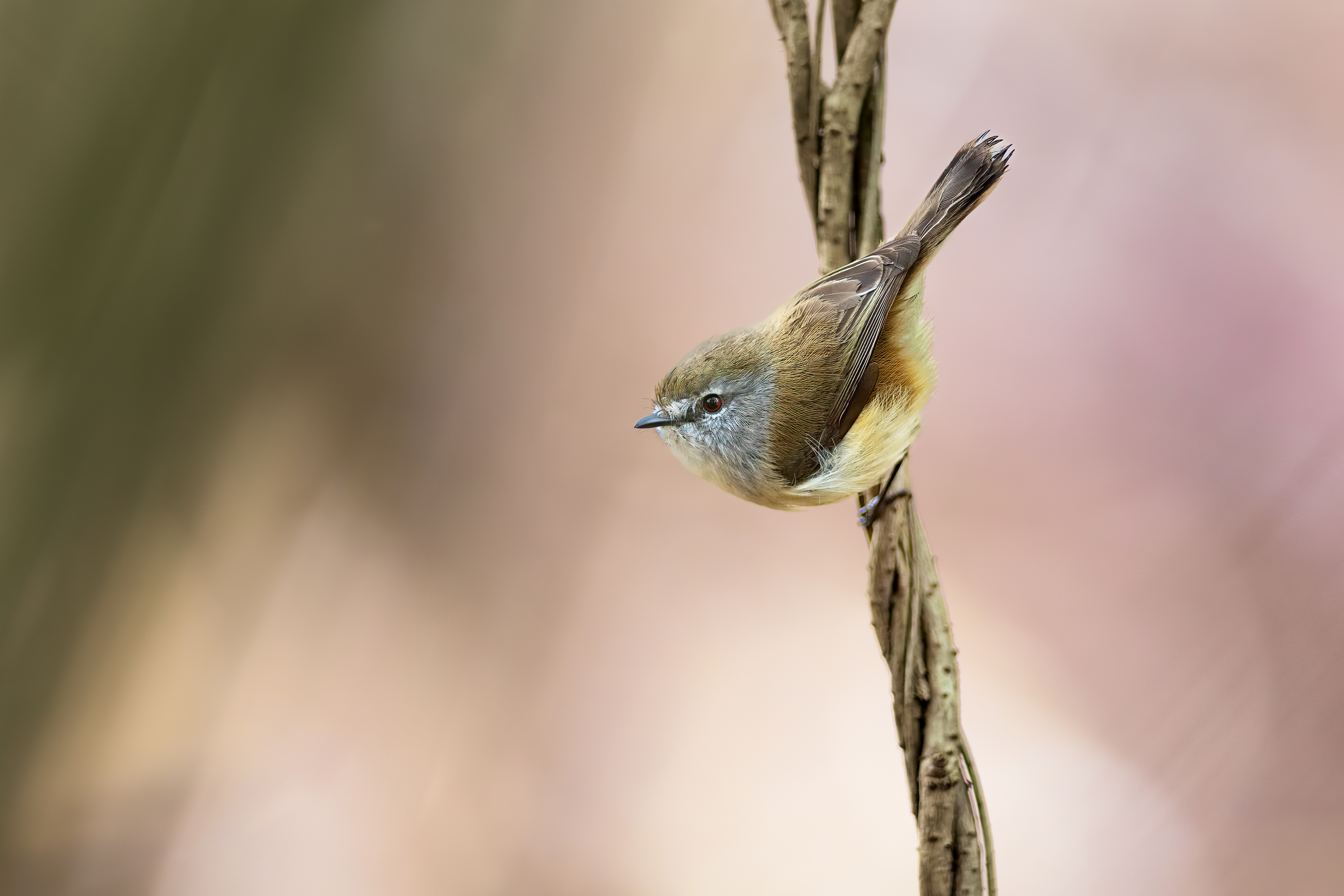

Conservation status
- Least Concern (IUCN 3.1)

Scientific classification
- Kingdom: Animalia
- Phylum: Chordata
- Class: Aves
- Order: Passeriformes
- Family: Acanthizidae
- Genus: Gerygone
- Species: G. mouki

Binomial name
- Gerygone mouki Mathews, 1912

Subspecies
- G. m. mouki - Mathews, 1912; G. m. amalia - Meise, 1931; G. m. richmondi - (Mathews, 1915)

= Brown gerygone =

Species of bird

The brown gerygone (Gerygone mouki), previously known as the brown warbler, is a small passerine bird native to eastern coastal Australia.

The upper parts are olive-brown (or olive-grey for the nominate subspecies native to far-north Queensland), while its face and underparts are a much paler grey, cream, or washed-out brown. The tail feathers are dark and may be white-tipped. It is approximately 10 cm in length.

The brown gerygone has a relatively large range. Although total population trends have not been quantified, it is considered of "least concern" by the IUCN.

It may be sighted in coastal rainforest, singly or in small groups of two to four. It feeds on insects. The brown gerygone call is a soft what-is-it.

It is not closely related to either true Old World Warblers or the New World Warblers, but belongs rather to the Corvida parvorder comprising many tropical and Australian passerines, as well as crows.

The brown gerygone is similar to both the large-billed (G. magnirostris) and mangrove (G. levigaster) gerygones. It differs from the former by having a distinctive white eyebrow and a grey-tinged face. The mangrove gerygone, while having a white eyebrow, lacks the grey face, has more white on the flanks and has a redder eye.
