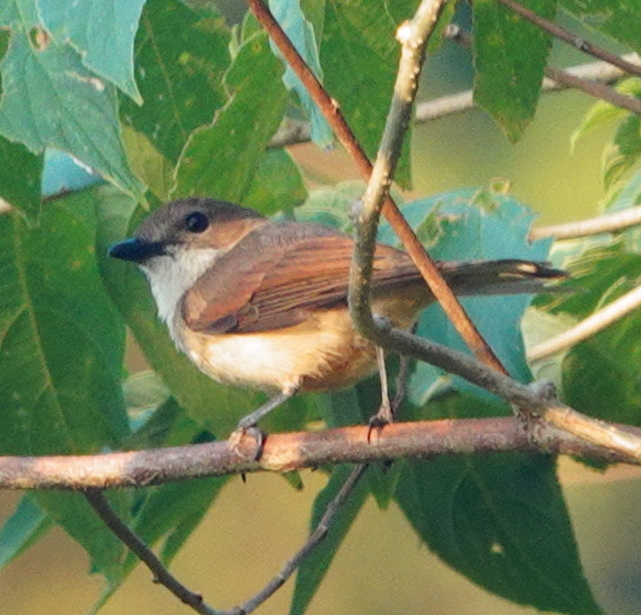

Conservation status
- Least Concern (IUCN 3.1)

Scientific classification
- Kingdom: Animalia
- Phylum: Chordata
- Class: Aves
- Order: Passeriformes
- Family: Acanthizidae
- Genus: Gerygone
- Species: G. dorsalis

Binomial name
- Gerygone dorsalis Sclater, PL, 1883

Subspecies
- G. d. senex - Meise, 1929; G. d. kuehni - Hartert, 1900; G. d. fulvescens - Meyer, AB, 1884; G. d. keyensis - Büttikofer, 1893; G. d. dorsalis - Sclater, PL, 1883
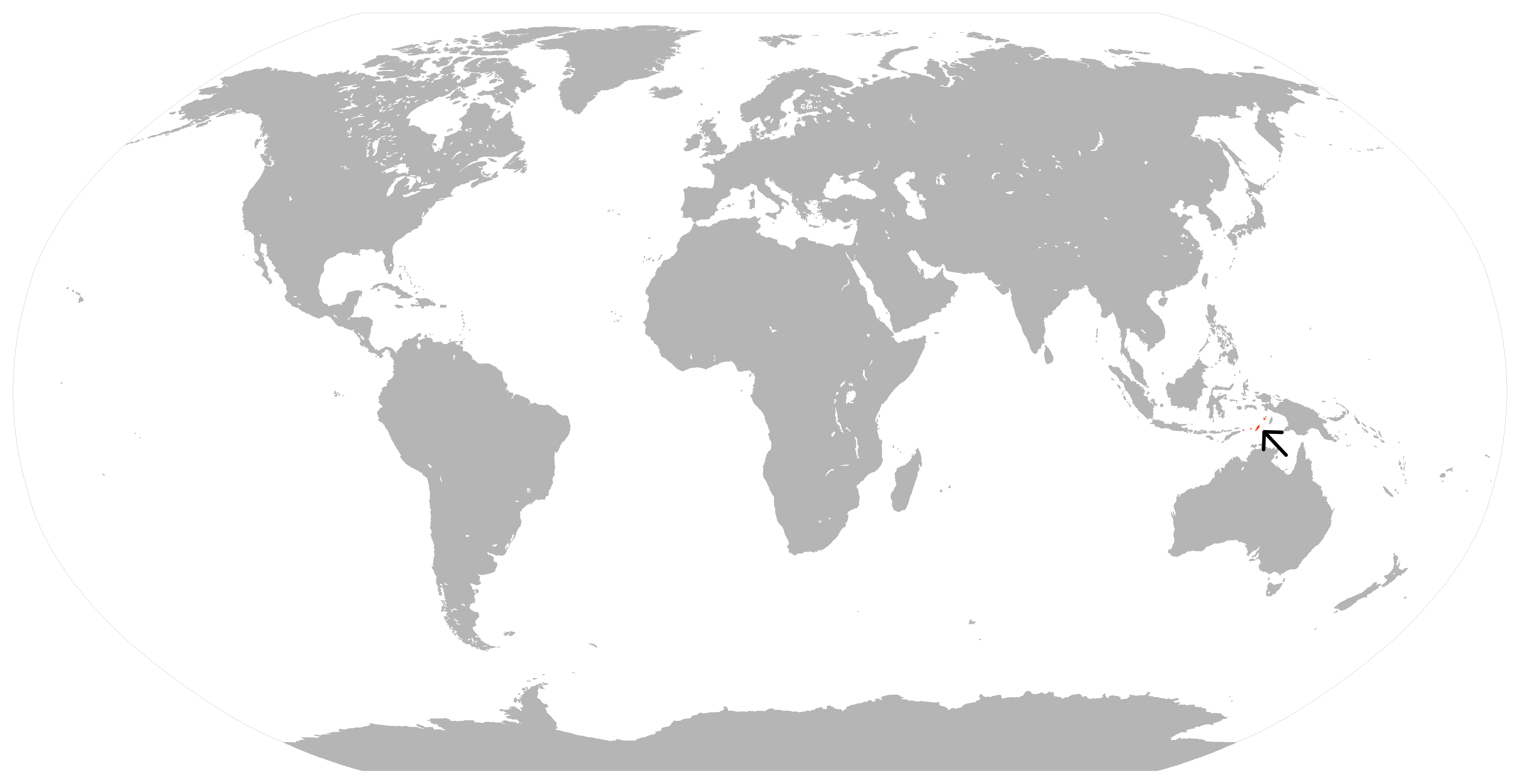

= Rufous-sided gerygone =

Species of bird

The rufous-sided gerygone (Gerygone dorsalis) is a species of bird in the family Acanthizidae. It is found in the eastern Lesser Sunda Islands and Kai Islands.

Its natural habitats are subtropical or tropical moist lowland forests and subtropical or tropical mangrove forests.
