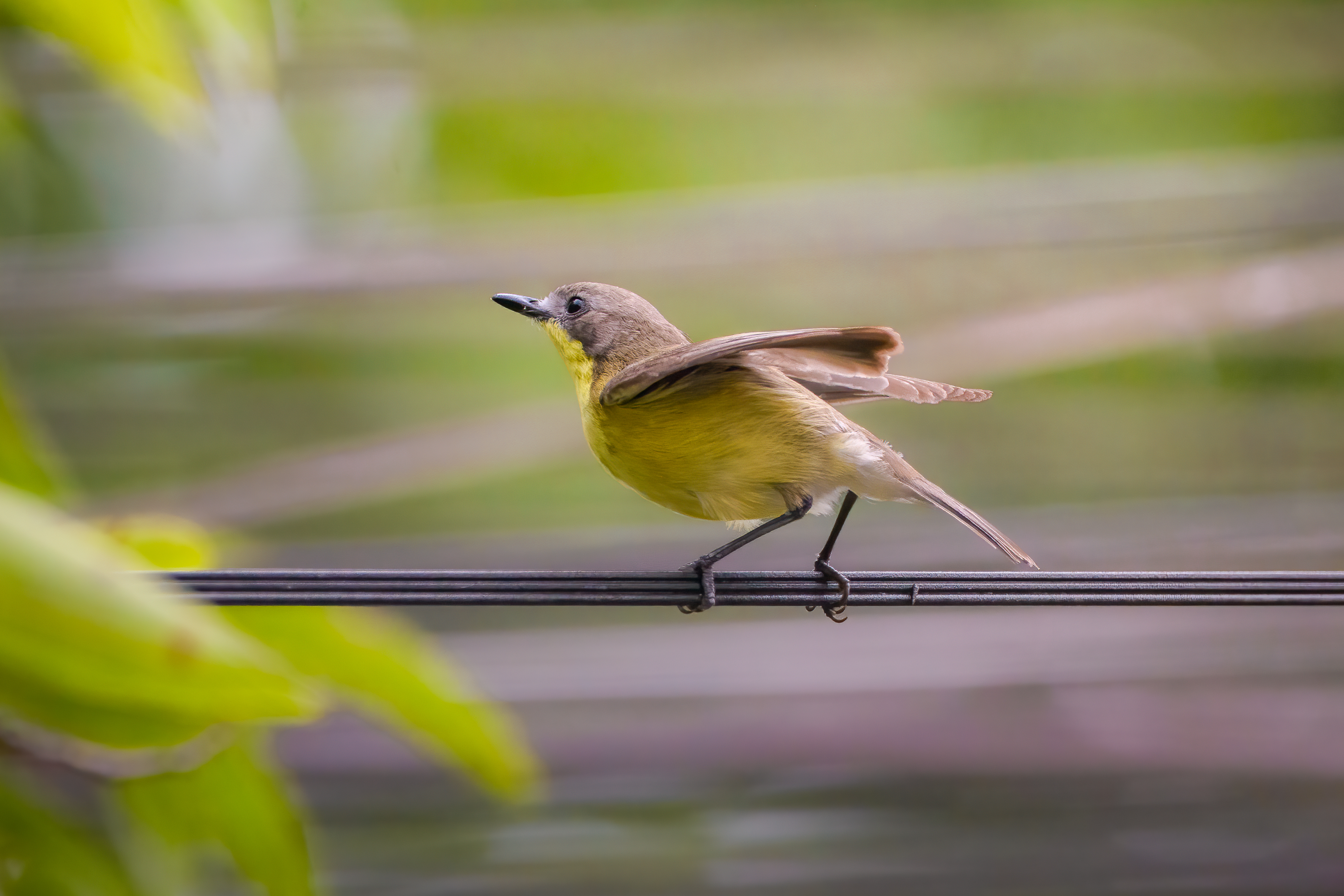
- Gerygone sulphurea sulphurea

Conservation status
- Least Concern (IUCN 3.1)

Scientific classification
- Kingdom: Animalia
- Phylum: Chordata
- Class: Aves
- Order: Passeriformes
- Family: Acanthizidae
- Genus: Gerygone
- Species: G. sulphurea

Binomial name
- Gerygone sulphurea Wallace, 1864

Synonyms
- Gerygone flaveola

= Golden-bellied gerygone =

Species of bird

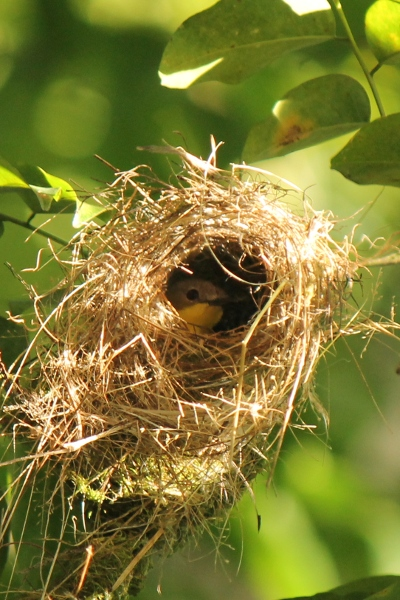
Gerygone sulphurea at nest

The golden-bellied gerygone (Gerygone sulphurea) is a species of bird in the family Acanthizidae. It is found in Brunei, Indonesia, Malaysia, the Philippines, Singapore, Cambodia, Vietnam and Thailand. Its natural habitats are subtropical or tropical moist lowland forest and subtropical or tropical mangrove forest.

== Taxonomy ==
Gerygone sulphurea includes the following subspecies:

- G. s. sulphurea - Wallace, 1864
- G. s. muscicapa - Oberholser, 1912
- G. s. simplex - Cabanis, 1872
- G. s. rhizophorae - Mearns, 1905
- G. s. flaveola - Cabanis, 1873
