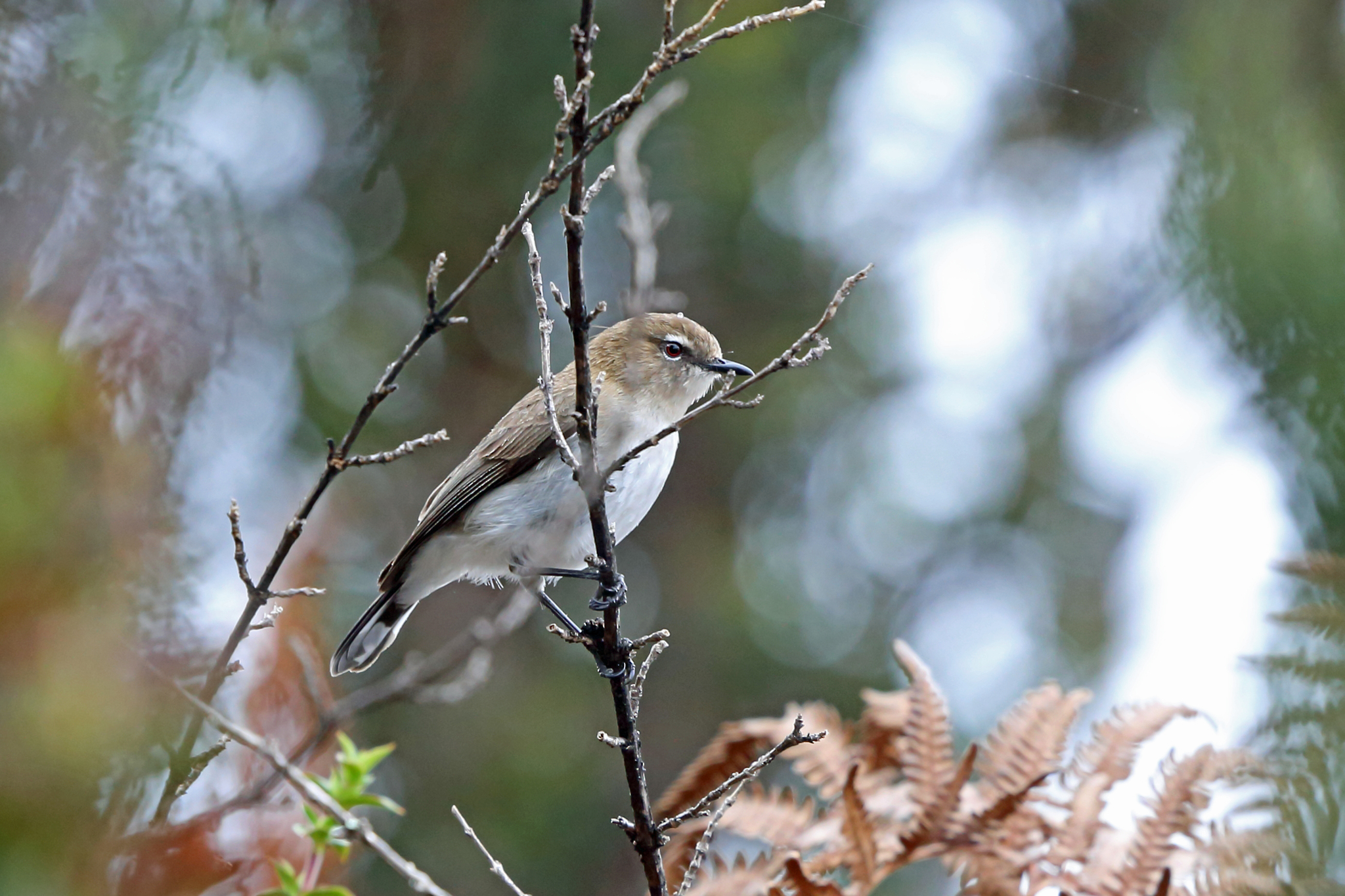

Conservation status
- Least Concern (IUCN 3.1)

Scientific classification
- Kingdom: Animalia
- Phylum: Chordata
- Class: Aves
- Order: Passeriformes
- Family: Acanthizidae
- Genus: Gerygone
- Species: G. ruficollis

Binomial name
- Gerygone ruficollis Salvadori, 1876

= Brown-breasted gerygone =

Species of bird

The brown-breasted gerygone or treefern gerygone (Gerygone ruficollis) is a species of bird in the family Acanthizidae. It is found in the highlands of New Guinea. Its natural habitat is subtropical or tropical moist montane forests.
