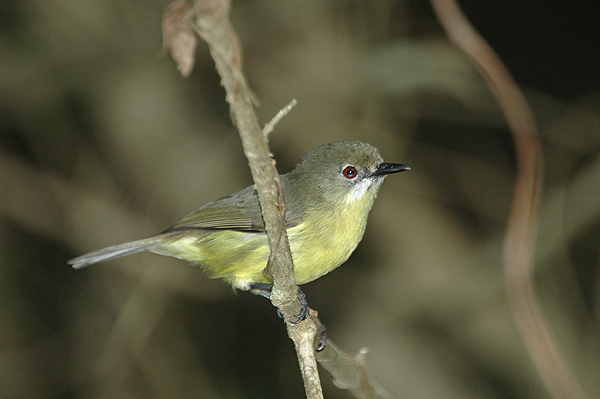
- Fairy gerygone (Gerygone palpebrosa)

Scientific classification
- Kingdom: Animalia
- Phylum: Chordata
- Class: Aves
- Order: Passeriformes
- Family: Acanthizidae
- Genus: Gerygone; Gould, 1841

Type species
- Psilopus albogularis Gould, 1838

= Gerygone =

Gerygones

Genus of birds

Gerygone (/dʒəˈrɪɡəni/), the gerygones or peep-warblers, is a genus of bird in the family Acanthizidae. The genus ranges from Southeast Asia through New Guinea and Australia to New Zealand and the Chatham Islands. Most of the species are found in Australia and New Guinea; only one, the golden-bellied gerygone, has managed to cross Wallace's Line and colonise as far as Thailand, Malaysia and the Philippines.

Gerygones are insectivores which obtain most of their food by gleaning and snatching in the foliage of trees and bushes. They are small, mostly weighing an average of 6–7 g, and show little variation in size across their range, except for the insular Chatham Islands gerygone, which is nearly twice as large as the rest of the genus.

Their songs are described as "simple but delightful", many descending in pitch, and some species are excellent mimics. "Gerygone" means "born of sound" (Magrath 2003).

== Taxonomy ==
In 1838 the English ornithologist John Gould introduced the genus Psilopus in which he placed four species. He specified the type species as Psilopus albogularis. This is now considered to be a junior synonym of Gerygone olivacea, the white-throated gerygone, as Gerygone olivacea was listed earlier on the page in Gould's work. In 1841, Gould, in a list of birds found on the western coast of Australia, added a note in which he replaced the name Psilopus with the name Gerygone as Psilopus had been previously employed in entomology by Johann Wilhelm Meigen. The genus name Gerygone is from Ancient Greek gērugonos meaning "echoes".

The genus contains 20 species including one which is now extinct:

- Brown gerygone, Gerygone mouki
- Grey gerygone, Gerygone igata
- Norfolk gerygone, Gerygone modesta
- † Lord Howe gerygone, Gerygone insularis – extinct (c.1930)
- Chatham Islands gerygone, Gerygone albofrontata
- Fan-tailed gerygone, Gerygone flavolateralis
- Rennell gerygone, Gerygone citrina – split from G. flavolateralis
- Brown-breasted gerygone, Gerygone ruficollis
- Golden-bellied gerygone, Gerygone sulphurea
- Rufous-sided gerygone, Gerygone dorsalis
- Mangrove gerygone, Gerygone levigaster
- Plain gerygone, Gerygone inornata
- Western gerygone, Gerygone fusca
- Dusky gerygone, Gerygone tenebrosa
- Large-billed gerygone, Gerygone magnirostris
- Biak gerygone, Gerygone hypoxantha – previous a subspecies of G. magnirostris
- Yellow-bellied gerygone, Gerygone chrysogaster
- Green-backed gerygone, Gerygone chloronota
- White-throated gerygone, Gerygone olivacea
- Fairy gerygone, Gerygone palpebrosa
