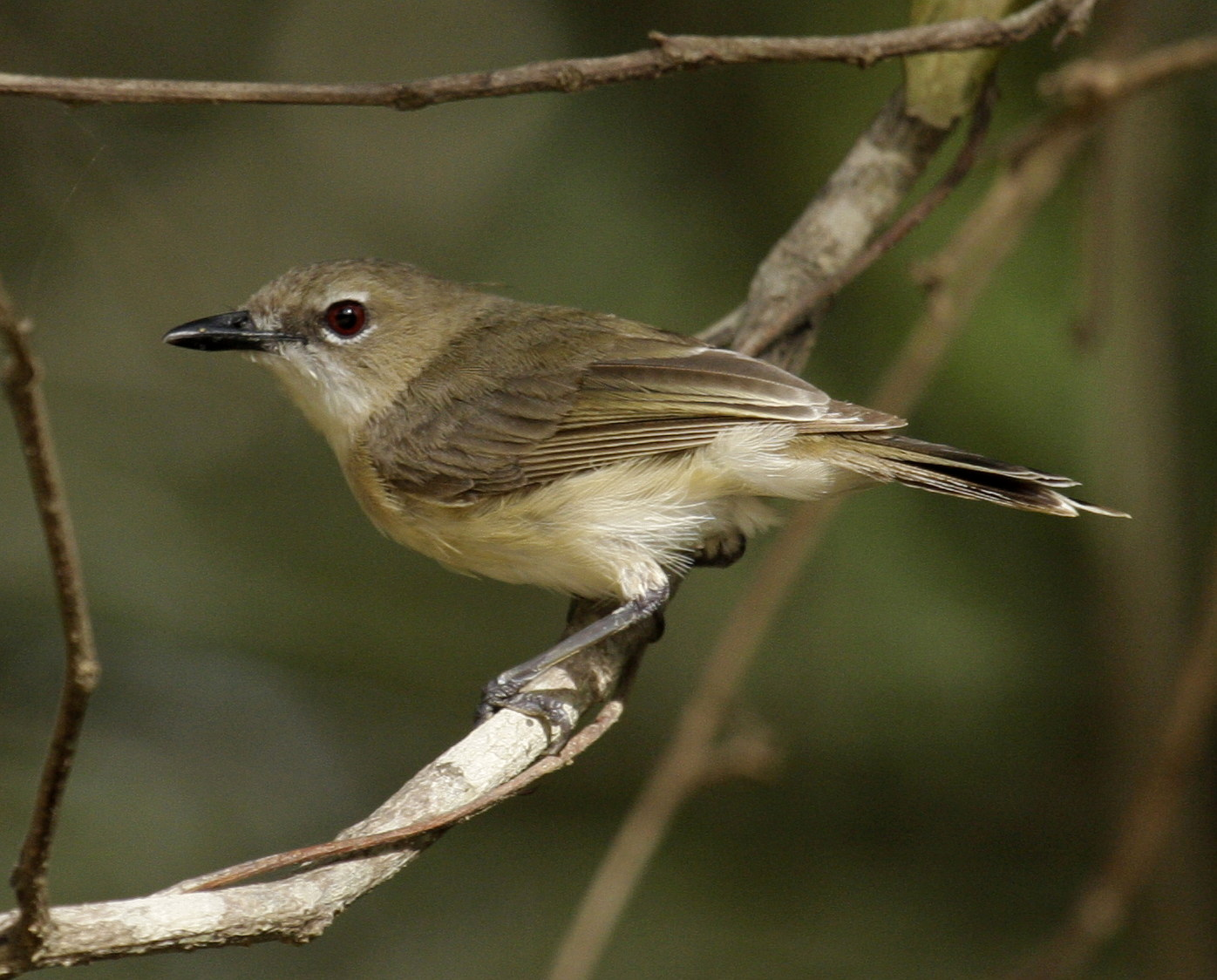

Conservation status
- Least Concern (IUCN 3.1)

Scientific classification
- Kingdom: Animalia
- Phylum: Chordata
- Class: Aves
- Order: Passeriformes
- Family: Acanthizidae
- Genus: Gerygone
- Species: G. magnirostris

Binomial name
- Gerygone magnirostris Gould, 1843

= Large-billed gerygone =

Species of bird

The large-billed gerygone (Gerygone magnirostris) is a species of bird in the family Acanthizidae found in northern Australia and New Guinea.

== Taxonomy ==
Gerygone magnirostris includes the following subspecies:

- G. m. conspicillata - (Gray, GR, 1859)
- G. m. affinis - Meyer, AB, 1874
- G. m. rosseliana - Hartert, 1899
- G. m. brunneipectus - (Sharpe, 1879)
- G. m. magnirostris - Gould, 1843
- G. m. cairnsensis - Mathews, 1912
