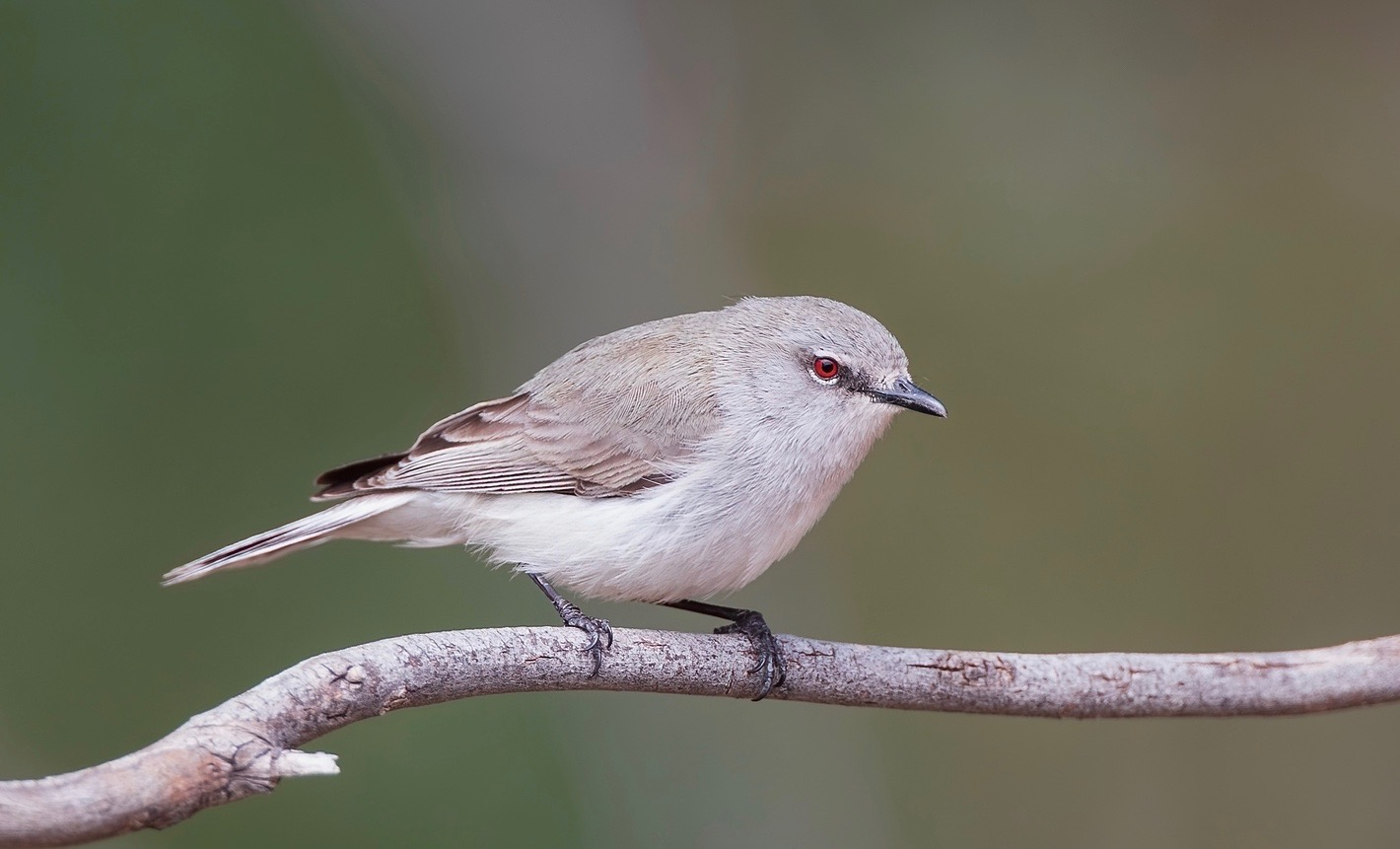
- Subspecies exsul

Conservation status
- Least Concern (IUCN 3.1)

Scientific classification
- Kingdom: Animalia
- Phylum: Chordata
- Class: Aves
- Order: Passeriformes
- Family: Acanthizidae
- Genus: Gerygone
- Species: G. fusca

Binomial name
- Gerygone fusca (Gould, 1838)

Subspecies
- G. f. fusca (Gould, 1838); G. f. exsul Mathews, 1912; G. f. mungi Mathews, 1912
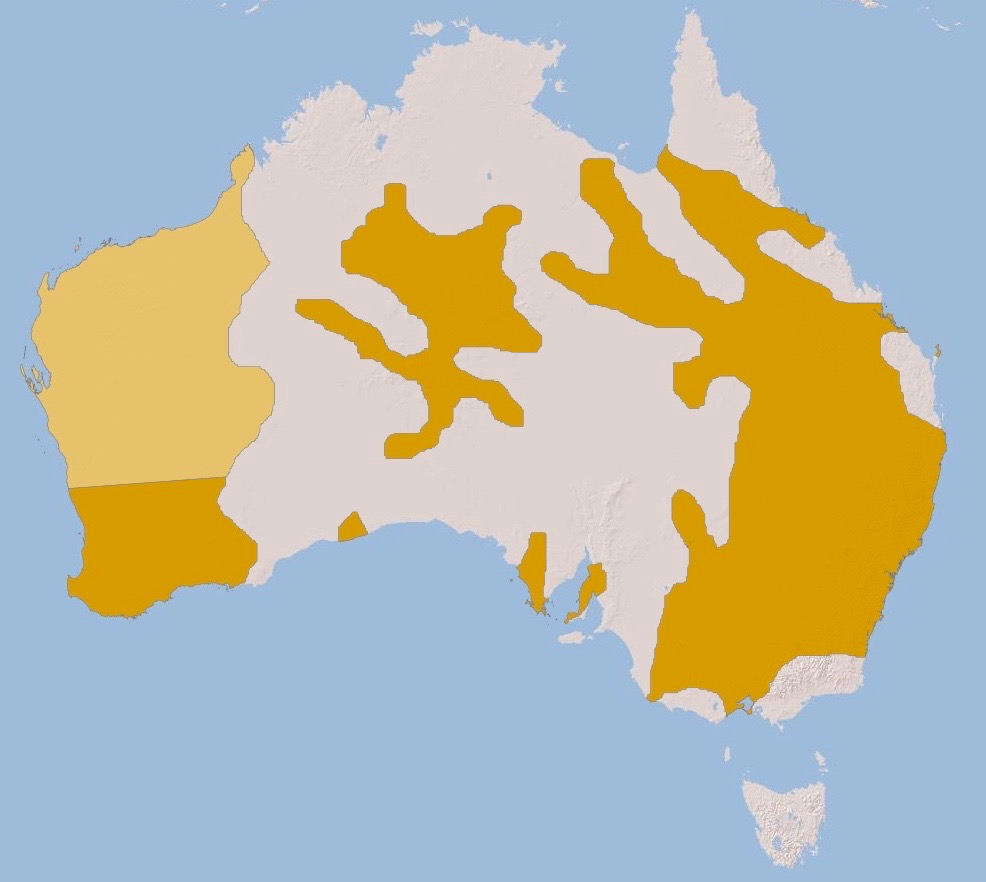
- Distribution of the western gerygone: Lighter shaded area represents non-breeding migration.

= Western gerygone =

Species of bird

The western gerygone (Gerygone fusca) is a small, brownish-grey species of passerine bird, which is found in inland and south-west Australia. It is an arboreal, insectivore of open forest, woodland and dry shrubland. It is not currently threatened with extinction (IUCN: Least Concern).

== Systematics and taxonomy ==
The western gerygone is a member of the family Acanthizidae (Thornbills and Allies), which has been split from the family Pardalotidae (Pardalotes).

It is a sister-species to the mangrove gerygone (Gerygone levigaster). The close relationship of this phylogenetic pair is suggested by analyses of both morphological characteristics and genetic loci. Populations of a common ancestor of the two species are thought to have diverged after becoming fragmented by severe aridity during the Pleistocene. These two species are now in secondary contact in the Carpentarian Basin, but occupy very different habitats and do not interbreed.

The common name western gerygone and scientific name Gerygone fusca are recognized by the taxonomies of the International Ornithological Congress, Clement's Checklist, the Handbook of the Birds of the World and Christidis and Boles.

== Description ==
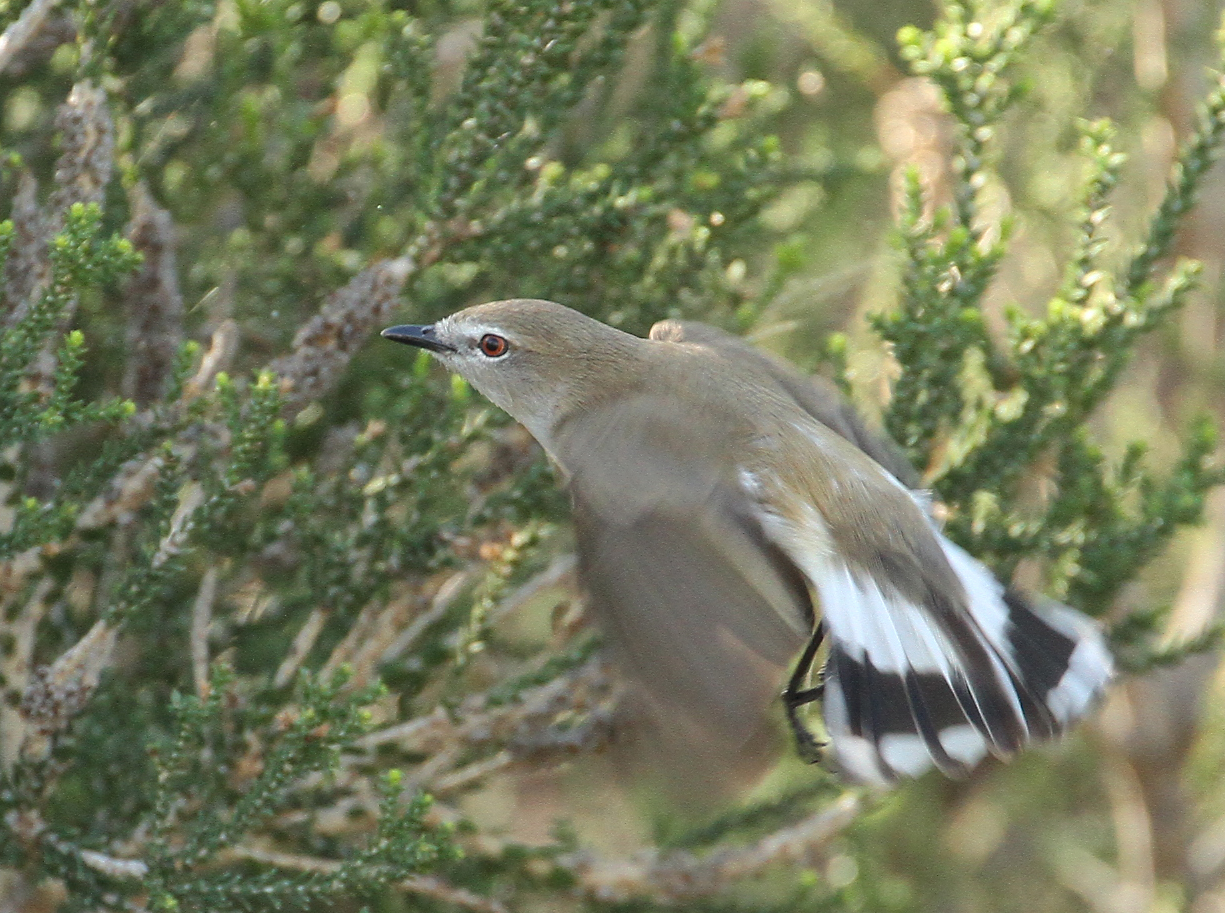
Western gerygone subspecies G. f. fusca. Note the distinctive tail pattern as it fans its tail, while hovering.

The western gerygone has plain, brownish-grey upperparts, with no prominent wing markings. The underparts are whitish, with variable amounts of grey on the throat and breast. The outer tail-feathers are conspicuously marked, with large, white patches at the base, a broad, blackish, subterminal tail band and white tips.

It is usually found singly or in pairs, in the mid to upper storey of trees and shrubs and is often located by its characteristic, persistent song. It can be very active when foraging.

The western gerygone is similar in appearance to several other Australian gerygones, which don't usually share its habitat. Its plumage can be distinguished from these species by the diagnostic large, white patches at base of its outer tail feathers.

== Distribution ==
The western gerygone is the most widespread gerygone species and is endemic to Australia. Its three subspecies show subtle differences in plumage and form geographically separate populations:

Subspecies fusca is found in south-west Western Australia.

Subspecies exsul is found in eastern Australia; from the Carpentarian Basin, through central and western Queensland, New South Wales and Victoria, and eastern South Australia. An isolated, resident population from the Eyre Peninsula in South Australia is usually ascribed to this subspecies.

Subspecies mungi is found in central Australia; in the interior of Western Australia, the Northern Territory and South Australia.

Nomadic individuals may travel far beyond this species' regular geographic limits.

Gerygone species are largely allopatric. They are usually separated from each other by their geographic distribution, or by their preference for different habitats. As it is the only gerygone of the Australian interior, the western gerygone does not overlap geographically with other gerygones throughout most of its range.

There are two island populations. Both are near Perth in Western Australia. Rottnest Island was colonized by the western gerygone in the 1950s. It was first observed on the island in 1955 and rapidly spread into all suitable habitat. On nearby Garden Island, which is closer to the Australian mainland, the species has been present since European records began.

== Ecology and behaviour ==
=== Habitat ===
The western gerygone occupies a wide range of wooded habitats. These vary from open sclerophyll forests, dominated by a broad array of eucalyptus species, to sparse mallee and mulga shrublands. It is often found along watercourses. In elevated regions, it only occurs below 850 meters.

=== Movement ===
Different populations of the western gerygone show different patterns of movement. Those in south-western Western Australia are partial migrants. They breed only in the south-west, but some individuals migrate inland or northwards during winter. Populations in the Carpentarian Basin and on the Eyre Peninsula are sedentary. Desert populations are partially nomadic, responding to inland rainfall.

=== Foraging ===
The western gerygone is insectivorous. Its foraging techniques include probing into bark, gleaning from foliage, hovering outside foliage and aerial strikes from perches. It may join other small birds in mixed-species feeding flocks.

=== Reproduction ===
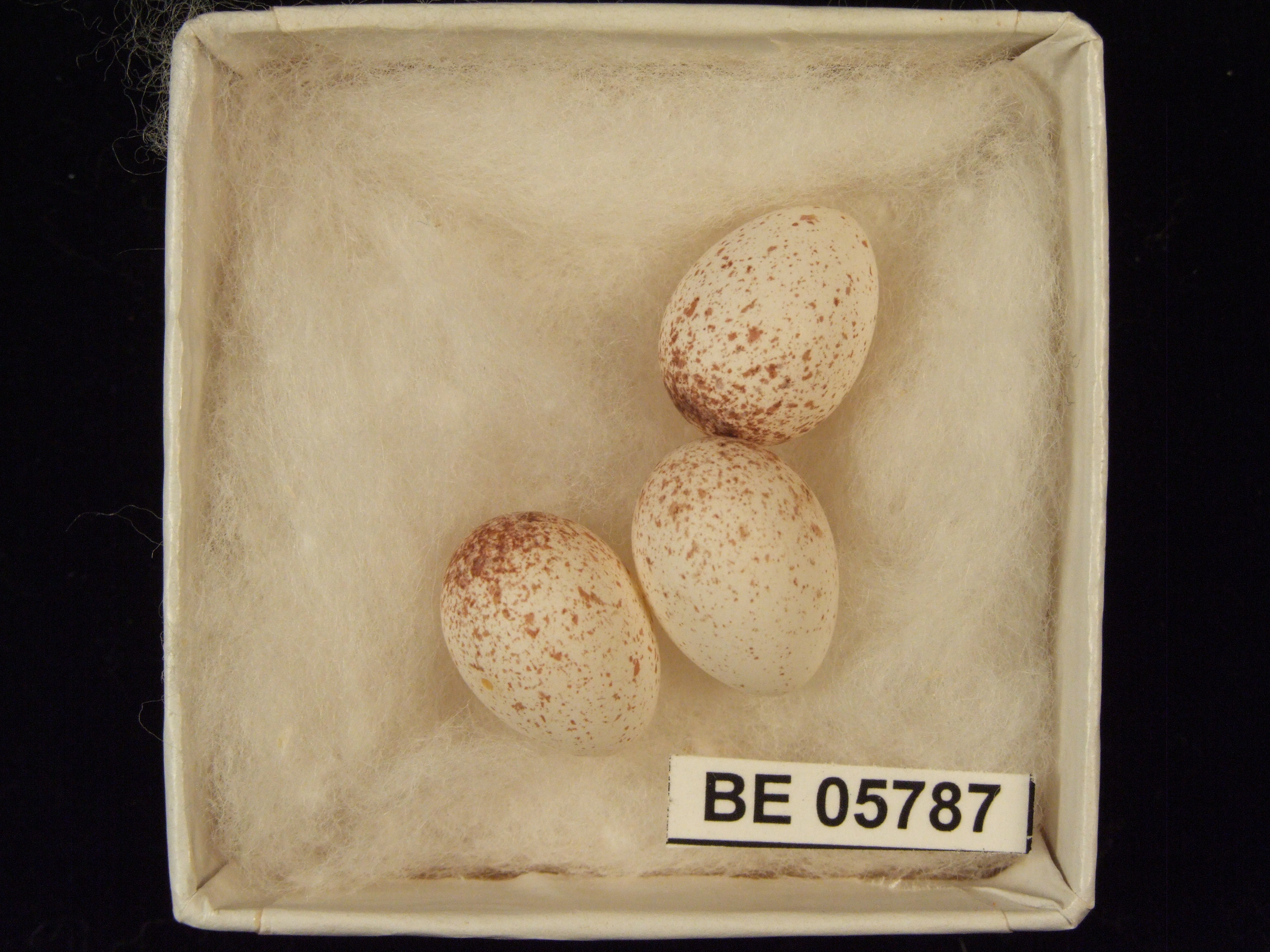
Western gerygone eggs from Balranald, NSW (Museums Victoria)

Breeding usually occurs between September and January, but has been recorded from August to March. Courtship involves intricate chases between pairs. Territories are maintained throughout the breeding season and territorial disputes involve agitated calls. Males display by intensely fluttering their wings and tail, with their bodies tilted horizontally.

The nest is a long, oval-shaped, pendent structure, with a hooded entrance near the top and a 'tail' at the bottom. Both sexes build the nest.

The clutch size is 2 or 3 eggs, (rarely 4). The incubation period lasts 10–12 days, and only the female incubates. The nestling period lasts 10–13 days, and both parents feed the nestlings. Fledglings are fed by their parents for up to 15 days, until independence.

=== Song ===
Western gerygone: Typical mainland song from Walpole, Western Australia.

The western gerygone's song is an irregular series of clear, high-pitched whistles, with a meandering melody. Each note maintains a consistent pitch and there is a distinct change in pitch between notes. Although the song isn't loud in volume, its persistence and distinctive tonal qualities are often recognizable from long distances. Singing birds may turn their head in different directions with each note.

Across different mainland populations, songs are fairly similar. Singing is mostly confined to the breeding season and this species is far less conspicuous when it is not breeding.

==== Song from the colony on Rottnest Island ====
Western gerygone: Distinctive song from Rottnest Island.

A distinct, new song has emerged in the western gerygone population which colonized Rottnest Island in the 1950s. Unlike the mainland song, its notes are delivered in a strictly repeated melody. (See sound files on right for comparison.) In 2003, it was estimated that more than a third of the western gerygones on Rottnest island sang the new song, including some individuals which sang both the new song and the typical mainland song.

The island biogeography of birdsong is of interest to evolutionary biologists because of its relevance to speciation. The novel western gerygone song on Rottnest Island is a notable example of both cultural innovation and cultural transmission by social learning. It has occurred over a rapid period of time in a recently isolated population. Sexual selection could eventually result in the typical, mainland western gerygone song on Rottnest Island being completely replaced with the novel song. If secondary contact is subsequently established with the original, mainland population, breeding birds may no longer respond to each other's songs. Behavioural reproductive isolation is a mechanism of evolutionary divergence.

== Status, threats and conservation ==
The western gerygone is common throughout much of its range, especially in Southwest Australia. Extensive clearing of native vegetation in this region has led to a reduction in abundance. Predation of western gerygones by feral cats is thought to be uncommon.

The Australian inland reaches extremely high temperatures in summer. Heat waves in these regions can result in sudden, dramatic, large-scale avian mortality events, with lasting ecological consequences. The frequency of such events is predicted to increase dramatically in coming decades, due to climate change. This poses a threat to Australia's inland birds, potentially including some western gerygone populations.

Despite a declining population trend, the western gerygone's conservation status is categorized as least concern by the IUCN and by most Australian state legislation. This species occupies a wide variety of habitats across a large geographic range, which encompasses numerous protected areas, including large, secure national parks.

== Gallery ==
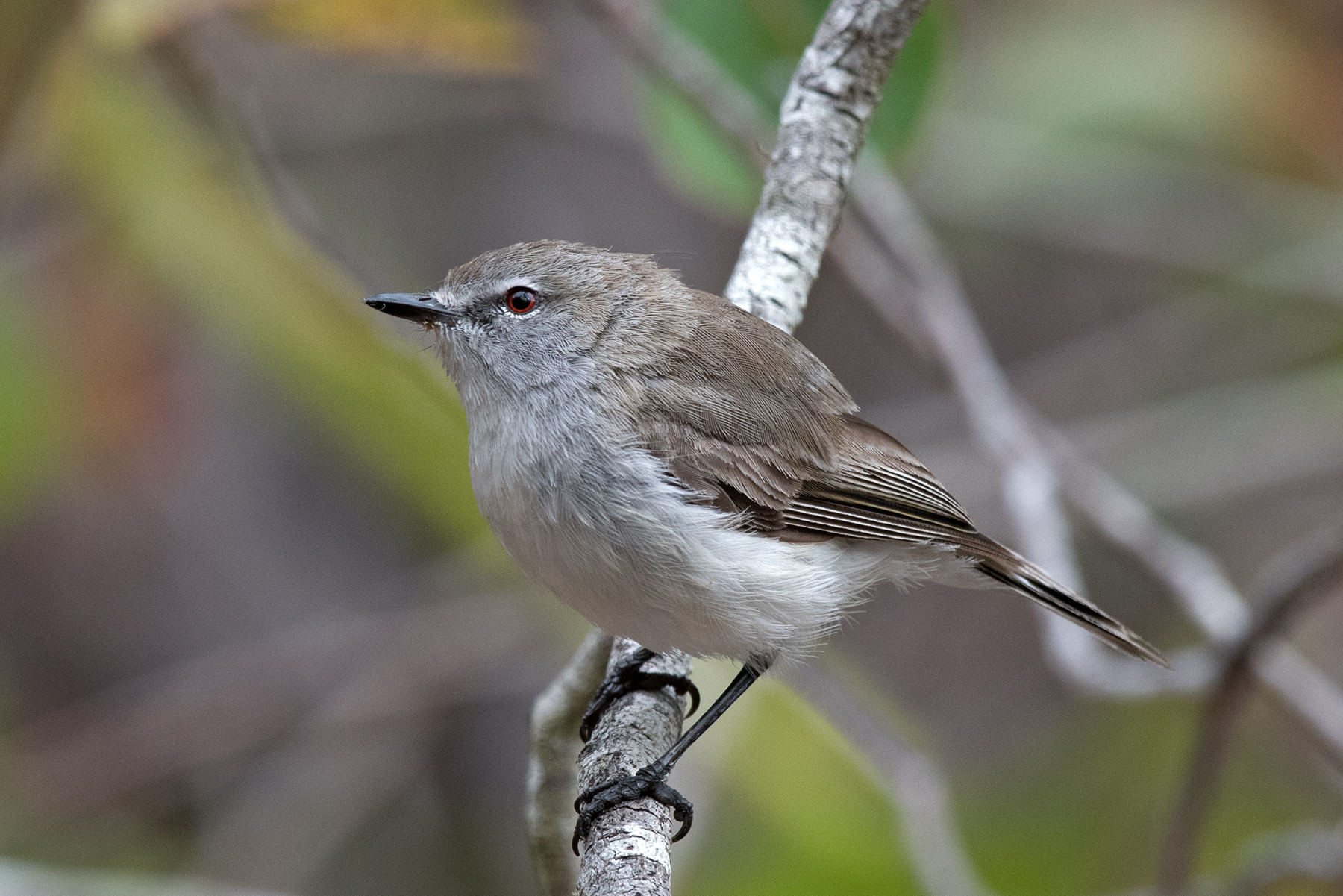
Subspecies fusca.

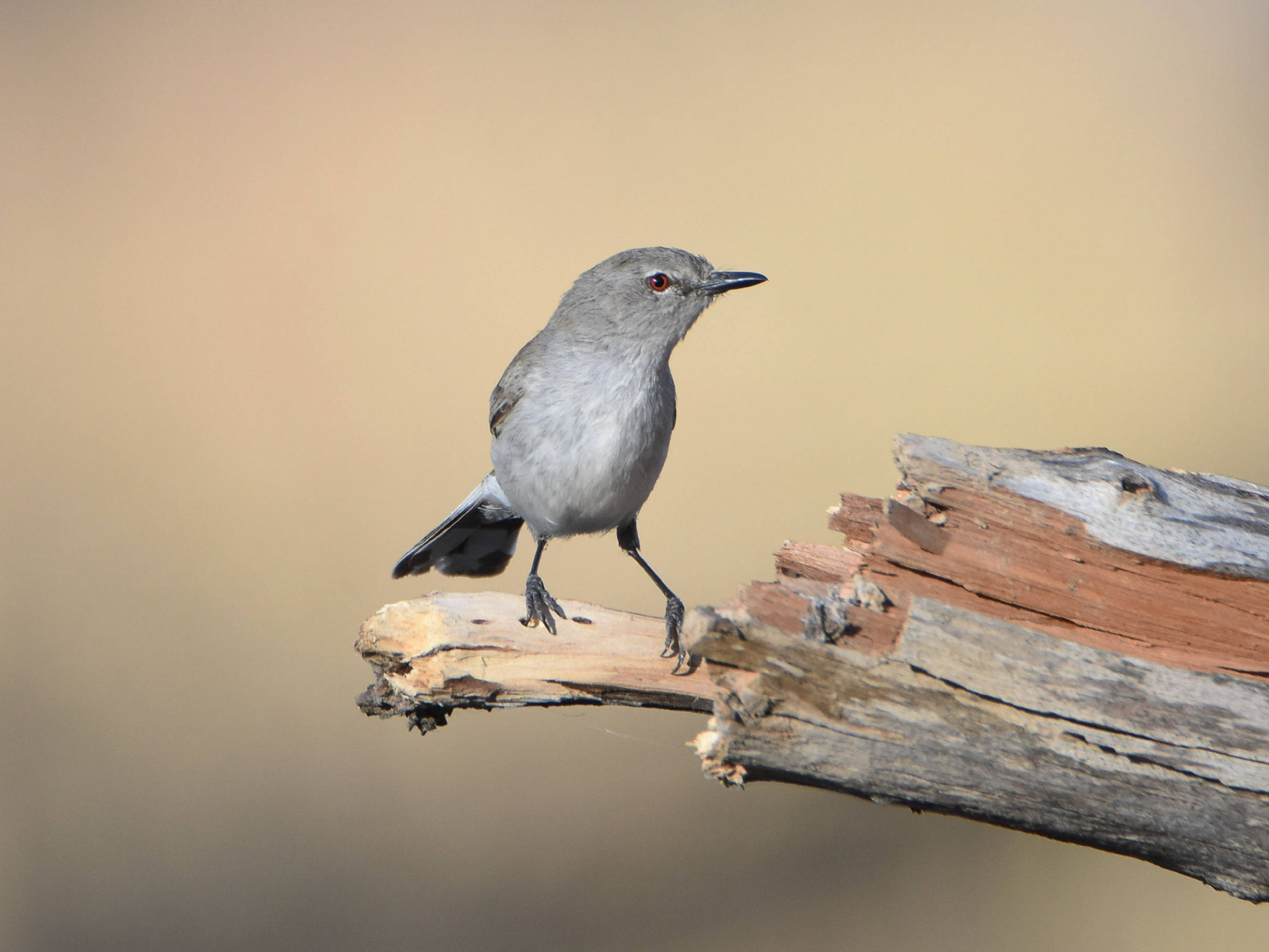
Subspecies exsul.

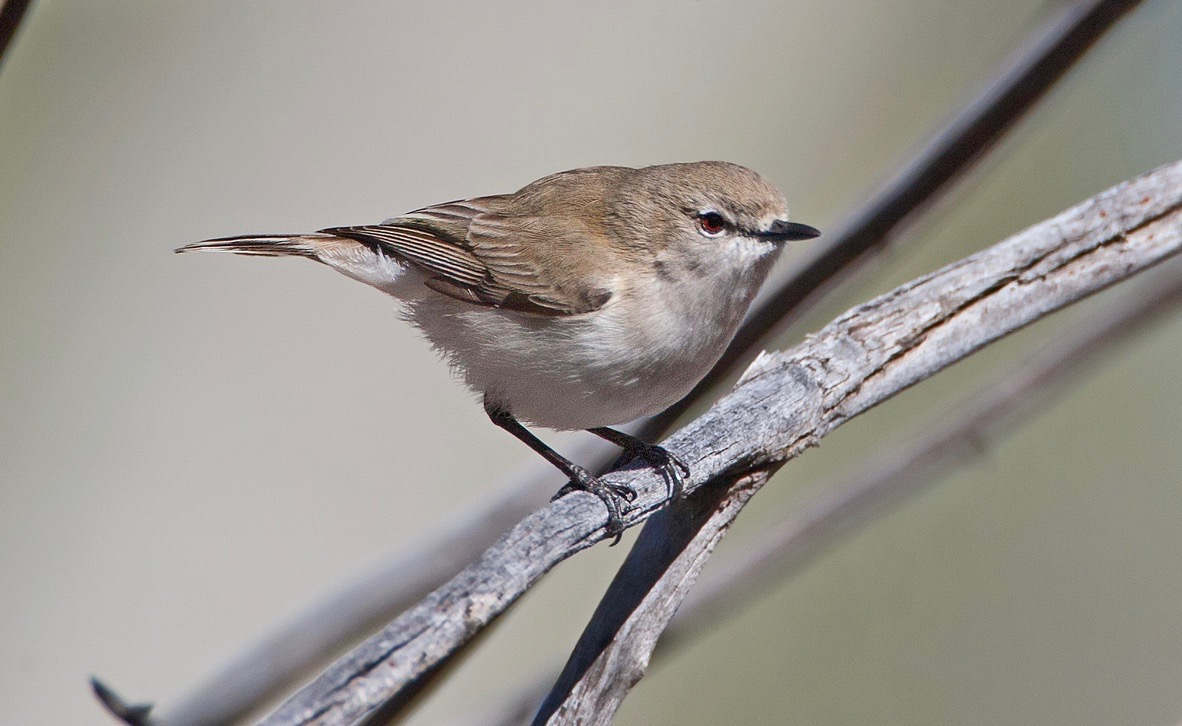
Subspecies mungi.

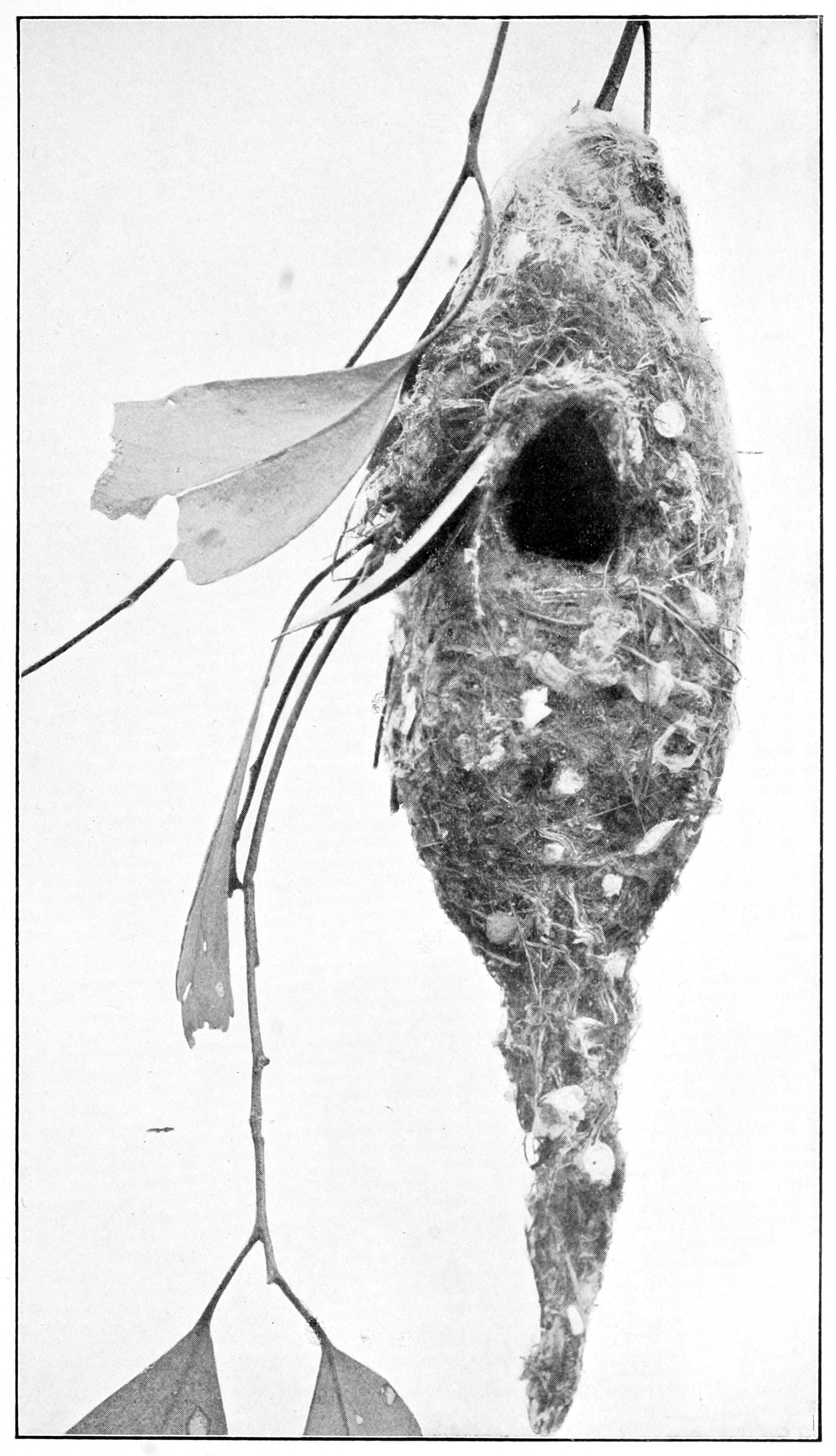
Nest of subspecies exsul. From Emu, 1912
