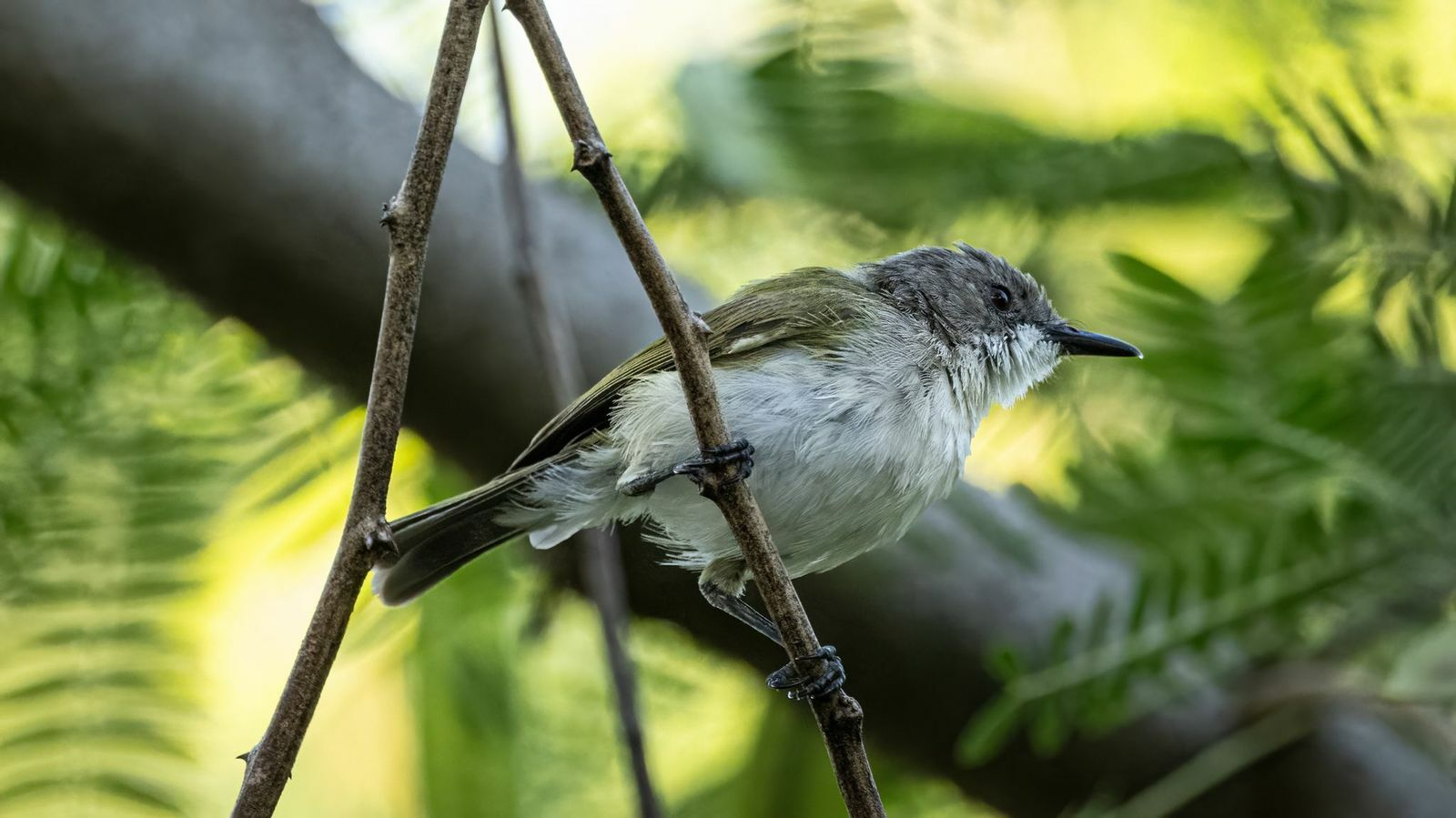

Conservation status
- Least Concern (IUCN 3.1)

Scientific classification
- Kingdom: Animalia
- Phylum: Chordata
- Class: Aves
- Order: Passeriformes
- Family: Acanthizidae
- Genus: Gerygone
- Species: G. chloronota

Binomial name
- Gerygone chloronota Gould, 1843

Subspecies
- G. c. chloronota - Gould, 1843; G. c. darwini - Mathews, 1912

= Green-backed gerygone =

Species of bird

The green-backed gerygone (Gerygone chloronota) is a species of bird in the family Acanthizidae found in northern Australia and New Guinea. Its natural habitats are subtropical or tropical moist lowland forests and subtropical or tropical mangrove forests.
