= Northern forktail =

- Enicurus sinensis indicus in Kamphaeng Phet, Thailand
- Enicurus sinensis sinensis in Zhejiang, China

Scientific classification
- Kingdom: Animalia
- Phylum: Chordata
- Class: Aves
- Order: Passeriformes
- Family: Muscicapidae
- Genus: Enicurus
- Species: E. sinensis

Binomial name
- Enicurus sinensis Gould, 1866

Synonyms
- Enicurus leschenaulti sinensis

Species of bird

The Northern forktail (Enicurus sinensis) is a species of bird in the family Muscicapidae. It is widely distributed through southern China and South-east Asia, from the Eastern Himalayas in India to Vietnam. It was described by John Gould in 1866. It has two subspecies.

== Taxonomy and systematics ==
This species was considered as conspecific with the Javan forktail and the Malayan forktail under the common name "white-crowned forktail". The three species were split based on differences in morphometrics, plumage, vocalizations and mitochondrial DNA. This species is similar to the two related species, but differs in the extent of white coloration, which does not extend past the midpoint of the crown; and the juvenile plumage, which is brown in this species and black in the others.

This species was formally described by John Gould in 1866 in the article Descriptions of Four New Species of Birds from Eastern Asia, published in the Proceedings of the Zoological Society of London from Shanghai.

There are two recognized subspecies —

- Enicurus sinensis indicus Hartert, 1910

This subspecies was formally described by Ernst Hartert in 1910 in the article Die Vögel der paläarktischen Fauna systematische Übersicht der in Europa, Nord-Asien und der Mittelmeerregion vorkommenden Vögel (Birds of the Palearctic fauna: systematic overview of birds occurring in Europe, North Asia and the Mediterranean region), from Margherita, Assam.

This subspecies is distributed from the Eastern Himalayas, from Sikkim and northern West Bengal, through Myanmar and Yunnan in southern China, and to Laos, Vietnam and northern Thailand, with a disjunct population in the Sankamphaeng Range. This subspecies is similar to the formerly conspecific Javan forktail, but the bill is longer.

- Enicurus sinensis sinensis Gould, 1866

The nominate subspecies is endemic to China and is found in the southern and eastern provinces of China, namely Qinghai, Gansu and Sichuan east to Guangdong and Zhejiang, including the island of Hainan. This subspecies is similar to indicus, but the outer rectrix is about 30-50 mm shorter than the next.

== Etymology ==
The genus name Enicurus is a combination of two Greek words: henikos (ἑνικος) "singular" and oura (ουρα) "tail". The species name sinensis refers to China, where the species was originally described, as does the subspecies name indicus, referring to India.

Illustration of the northern forktail in John Gould's Birds of Asia

== Description ==
It is one of the largest forktails, about 25-28 cm in length. It is a strikingly black-and-white colored bird. Most of the plumage is black and has a white wing patch. The underparts and the crown are white in color. This species has a large tail, which is deeply forked, and has white tail-tips, with white outer feathers. The back and chest are black in color, with black shoulders and scapulars. The lower back and the rump are also black in color. The bill is black, and the legs are pinkish in color. The wing coverts are mostly black except for the white wing patch that covers the tips of the greater coverts and the bases of the inner secondaries and tertials. Both the sexes are similar.

The juvenile is similar to the adult, except for the head, flanks and upperparts, which are brown in color; and the belly, which is mottled brown.

This species can be separated from the black-backed forktail by the presence of a black chest; the slaty-backed forktail by the presence of black upperparts (grey in slaty-backed forktail) and from the spotted forktail by the absence of spots on the back.

== Behaviour and ecology ==
=== Status and distribution ===
It is uncommon in the Himalayas but is common in the hills of Assam and Arunachal Pradesh. It is common in China and throughout most of its South-east Asian range. It does not migrate, but shows some seasonal movement, moving away from higher elevations in North-east India in the winter. It becomes more common in Bhutan during the winter months. This species is a vagrant to north-east Bangladesh and were recorded twice in the months of October and December.

=== Habits ===
This species occurs in pairs during the breeding season, but it is more solitary in winter. It is a shy bird and is territorial and year-round. It holds its tail slightly slanted upwards and raises and opens it with a scissor-like action. Its flight is swift and direct.

=== Habitat ===
This species occupies fast-flowing rocky streams, rivers and brooks through dark evergreen forest, and sometimes occupies dark ravines. It has been noted to visit village drains and cesspits in southern China. The subspecies indicus occurs up to an elevation of 1250 m in the Himalayas, sometimes up to 2400 m in Arunachal Pradesh, but is most common below 800 m.

=== Diet and foraging ===
This species has been recorded to feed on insects, mainly beetles, water crickets, caterpillars and springtails. This species forages on rocks around the water's edge, and it sometimes submerges itself in the water in the manner of dippers. It forages with a quick pecking and walking motion.

=== Vocalizations ===
This species utters a variety of different calls and songs, with juveniles uttering Tseee calls.

The adults also give a Tseee call, which may be uttered 3-10 times with no intervals between them or with an interval of a few seconds. Sometimes a buzzing Gzweet sound is uttered, which is repeated several times at intervals.

The territorial display of the male is a rising and falling musical song, beginning with a descending whistle.

=== Breeding ===
This species constructs nests out of green moss, leaves and grass; which is lined with bits of leaves. The material used to build the nest is cleaned thoroughly in the stream before being taken to the nesting site. The nest is placed in a crevice in a rock above the stream, and it is always placed adjacent to water, keeping it well concealed from view. One nest was built near a waterfall such that the parent birds had to cross the waterfall to provide food to their young.

The clutch size is two to five eggs and is four to five eggs in subspecies sinensis. The eggs are creamish-white and are spotted with red, lilac and salmon and are 2.3 x 1.7 cm in size. During the mating display, the male sings a warbling song.

The breeding season is April-June in the Himalayas, April in Myanmar, and April-July in south China.
