= Malayan forktail =

- In Sabah, Malaysia
- In Nakhon Si Thammarat, Thailand

Scientific classification
- Kingdom: Animalia
- Phylum: Chordata
- Class: Aves
- Order: Passeriformes
- Family: Muscicapidae
- Genus: Enicurus
- Species: E. frontalis

Binomial name
- Enicurus frontalis Blyth, 1847

Synonyms
- Enicurus leschenaulti frontalis

Species of bird

The Malayan forktail (Enicurus frontalis) is a species of bird in the family Muscicapidae. It is found from extreme southern Myanmar and the Malay Peninsula to Sumatra and Borneo. It was described by John Gould in 1866. It has two subspecies.

== Taxonomy and systematics ==
This species was considered as conspecific with the Javan forktail and the northern forktail under the common name "white-crowned forktail". The three species were split based on differences in morphometrics, plumage, vocalizations and mitochondrial DNA. This species is similar to the two related species, but differs in having a much smaller size, shorter tail, having a different number of white bands on the tail, and the extent of white on the crown, which extends past the midpoint in this species.

This species was formally described by Edward Blyth in 1847 in the article Notices and Descriptions of various New or Little Known Species of Birds, published in the The Asiatic Society. The holotype was collected from Malacca.

There are two recognized subspecies —

- Enicurus frontalis frontalis Blyth, 1847

This subspecies is the more widely distributed subspecies, found in the central Malay Peninsula, lowland Borneo, Sumatra and Nias. This subspecies is similar to the Javan forktail, but it is smaller and has less white on the crown.

- Enicurus frontalis chaseni de Schauensee, 1940

This subspecies is restricted to the Batu Islands off northern Sumatra. The holotype was collected on 7 September 1896 by Jan Zacharias Kannegieter from Tanahmasa. This subspecies is much larger than subspecies frontalis and has a longer tail.

== Etymology ==
The genus name Enicurus is a combination of two Greek words: henikos (ἑνικος) "singular" and oura (ουρα) "tail". The specific epithet frontalis refers to the distinctively colored brow or white crown of this species. The subspecies name chaseni commemorates the British ornithologist Frederick Nutter Chasen.

== Description ==
This species is one of the largest forktails, similar in size to the northern forktail and the Javan forktail. It is a black-and-white colored bird, with a deeply forked tail, which is evenly graduated with white tips. The head and the breast are black, and the crown has a white patch which extends to the midcrown. The back and scapulars are black, with a white wing-patch. The lower back, rump and lower underparts are also black, while the belly is white.

The bill is black and the legs are pinkish in color. The male and female are similar in plumage.

The juvenile coloration is black, not brown like the juveniles of the northern forktail. This species may also come into contact with the northern forktail in the Malay Peninsula, however, this species has a different alarm and contact call. It is similar to the Bornean forktail, which occurs in the highlands of Borneo, but the Bornean forktail has a shorter crown patch and a thinner wing patch; and is smaller with a longer tail.

== Vocalizations ==
The song is uncommonly heard, and is a musical song consisting of high-pitched whistles and clacking notes with short whistles.

The tsee call of this species is similar to the northern forktail and may be repeated several times with intervals of a few seconds or in a series of 3-10 whistles with no pause between them. The gzweet call, uttered by the northern forktail, is absent in this species.

== Behaviour and ecology ==
=== Behaviour ===
This species occurs on streams and rivers near the chestnut-naped forktail in Malaysia and is a shy and cautious bird. It holds its tail slanted upwards and may open and close it rapidly in a scissor like motion. It flies at the first sight of disturbance and when alarmed, raises the feathers of the crown.

=== Diet and foraging ===
Its diet includes earthworms, springtails, beetles and water crickets. It forages in water, on the water's edge, or on rocks; with a quick pecking and walking motion, or rarely submerging itself in the water, in the manner of dippers.

=== Habitat ===
This species occurs near fast-flowing rivers, streams and brooks; and is occasionally seen in areas of dry forest and even roadsides in central Borneo. It occurs at an elevation of about 1400 m in Sumatra and Borneo. In peninsular Malaysia and southern Thailand, it occurs at an elevation of less than 760 m.

=== Breeding ===
The breeding habits of this species are poorly known. Nests are built in a shallow recess in the dry bed of gully 50 m away from a river, in limestone 1.5 m from the ground. The nest is made of mud and moss, and lined with leaf skeletons.
