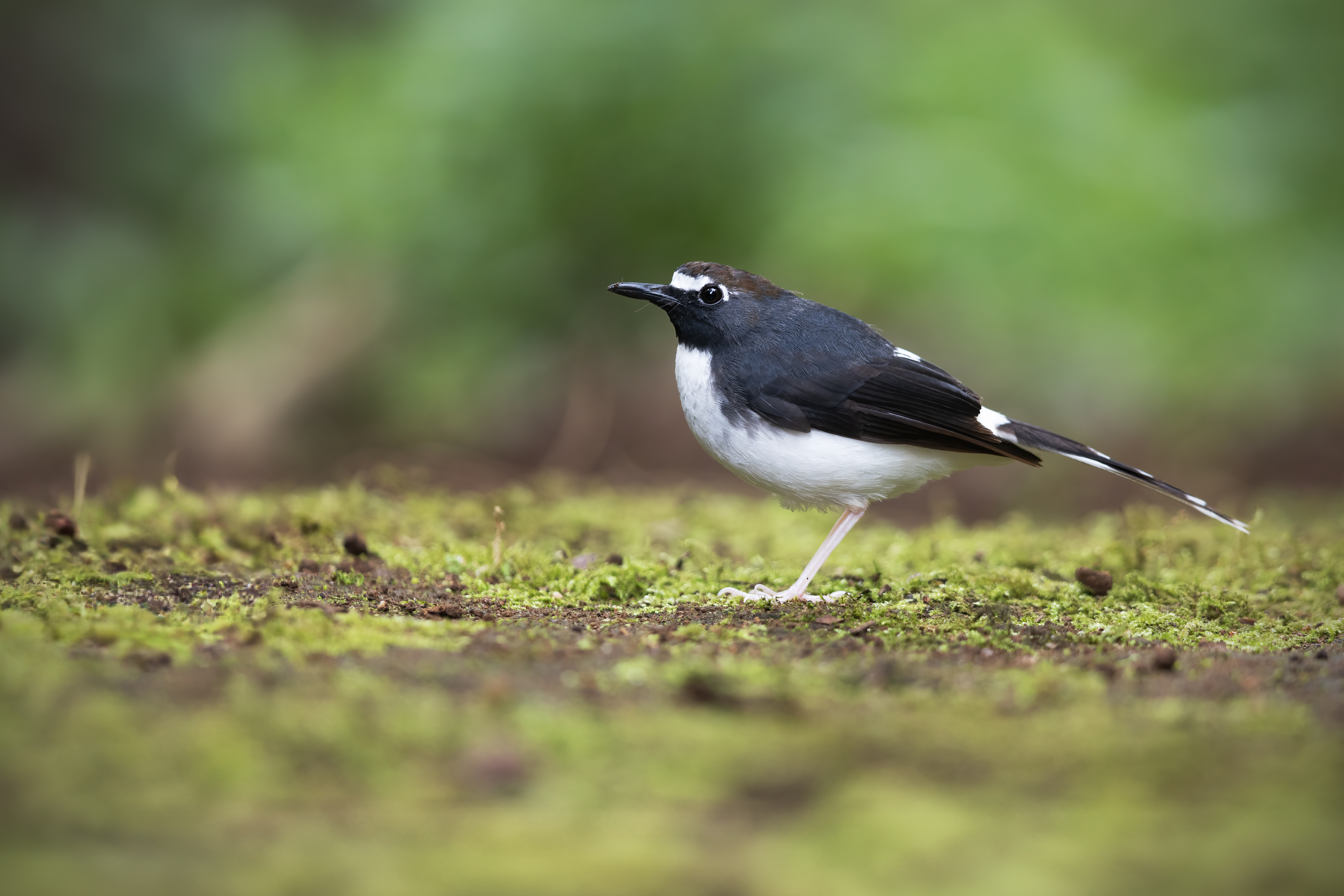
- Female
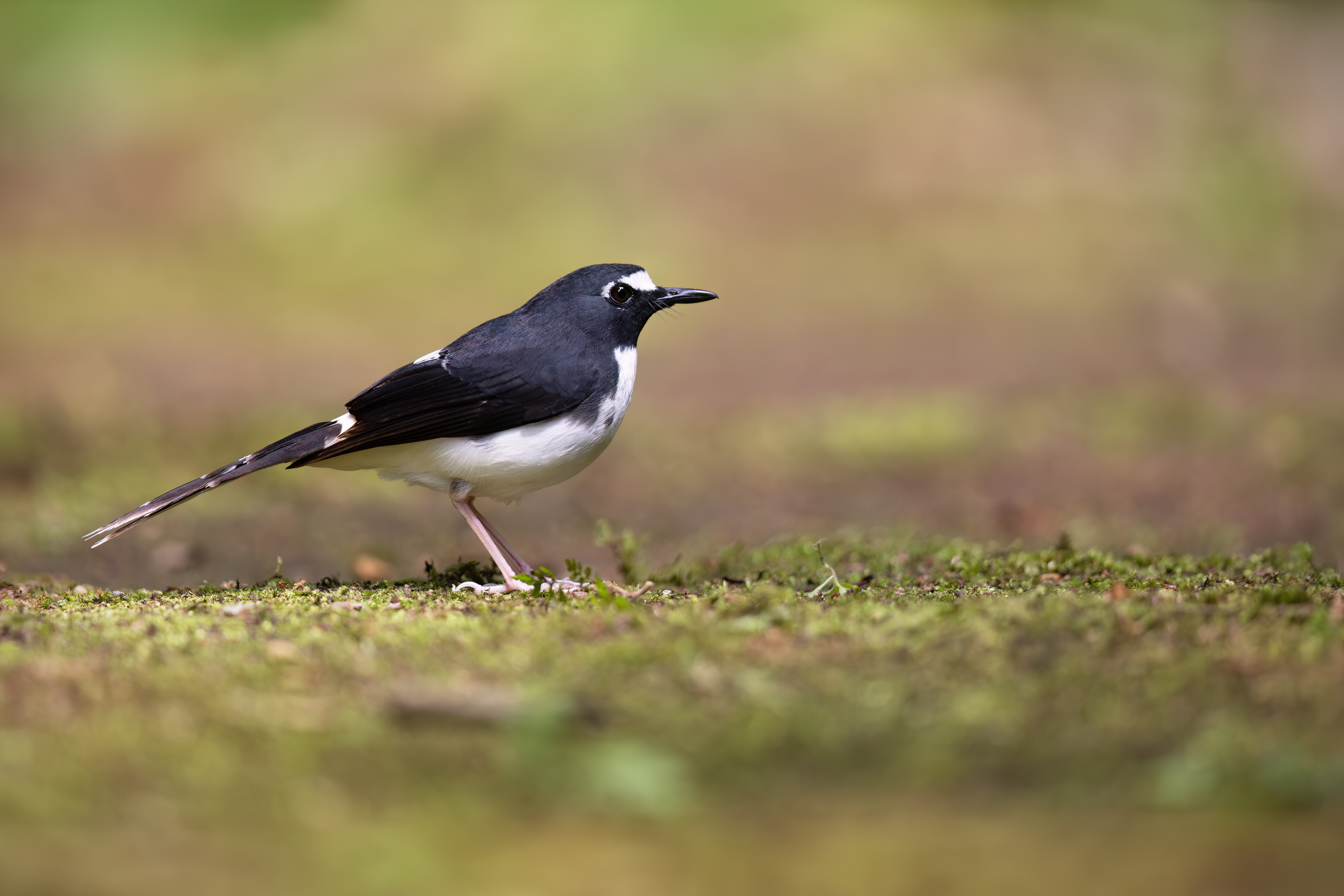
- Male

Conservation status
- Least Concern (IUCN 3.1)

Scientific classification
- Kingdom: Animalia
- Phylum: Chordata
- Class: Aves
- Order: Passeriformes
- Family: Muscicapidae
- Genus: Enicurus
- Species: E. velatus

Binomial name
- Enicurus velatus Temminck, 1822

= Sunda forktail =

Species of bird

The Sunda forktail (Enicurus velatus) is a species of bird in the family Muscicapidae. It is endemic to Indonesia, where it is restricted to the islands of Java and Sumatra. Its natural habitat is boulder strewn streams in tropical moist montane forest from 600–2000 m. More rarely the species occurs closer to sea level. The species is common in Sumatra, but is rarer in Java, where the white-crowned forktail is more common.

== Taxonomy ==
The Sunda forktail was formally described and illustrated in 1822 by the Dutch zoologist Coenraad Jacob Temminck under the binomial name Enicurus velatus. The specific epithet velatus is Latin meaning "veiled".

Two subspecies are recognised:

- E. v. sumatranus Robinson & Kloss, 1923 – montane Sumatra
- E. v. velatus Temminck, 1822 – montane Java

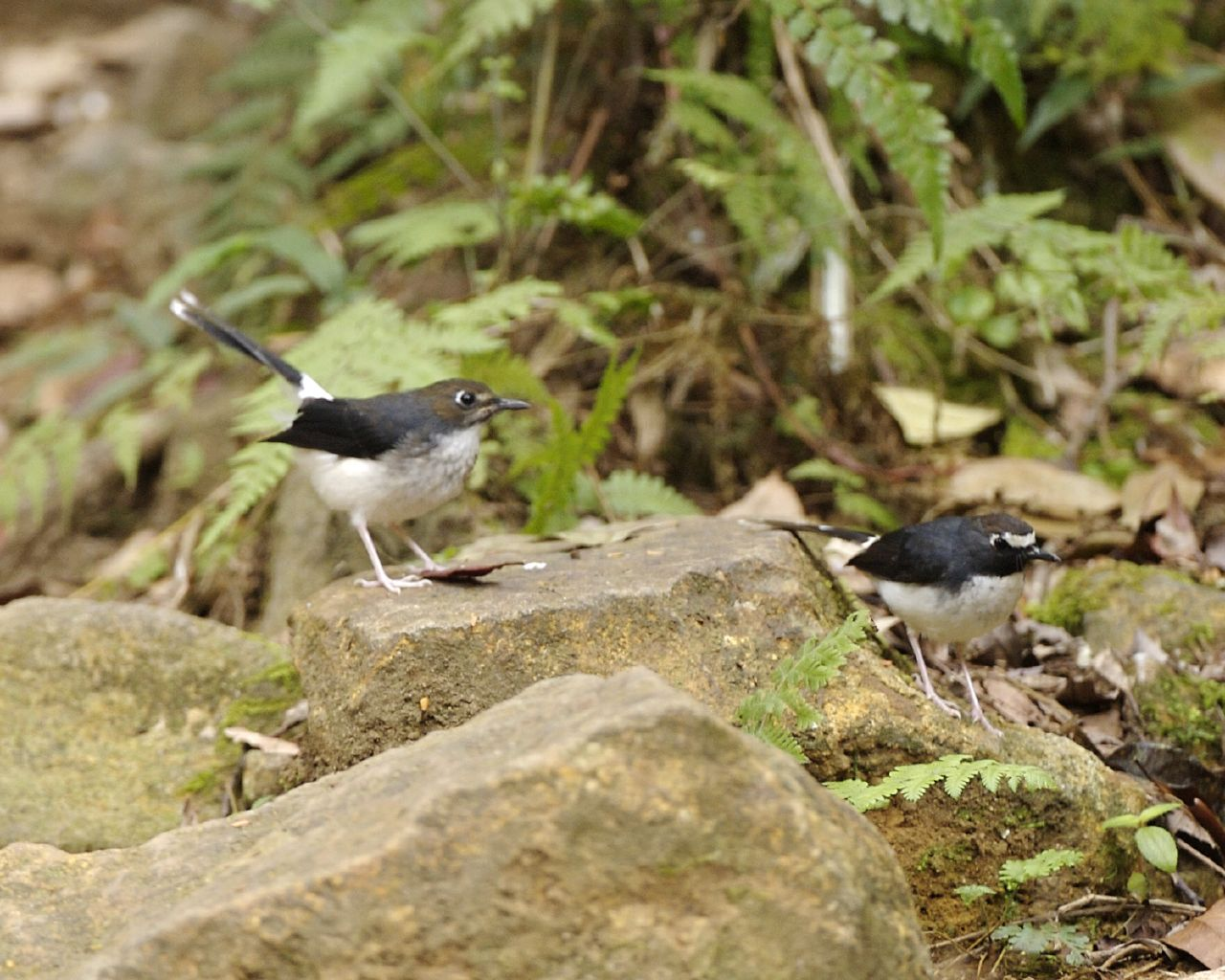
Female with juvenile

== Description ==
The Sunda forktail is 16 cm (6.3 in) in length with a deeply forked tail. The male has a white breast, belly and rump, and black wings, and a dark grey back and head. There is a small white line between the eyes. The tail is black with white barring. The female is similar to the male but has a brown crown and nape. The nominate race is found on Java. The Sumatran subspecies, sumatranus, differs from the nominate in having more rufous brown on the female. The call of this species is a hard shrill "chee" or "hie-tie-tie"

== Behaviour ==
The Sunda forktail feeds on aquatic insects and their larvae, as well as snails. The nest of this species is a large cup of woven mosses, grasses leaves and wood fibres. Two whitish with red spotting eggs are a laid.
