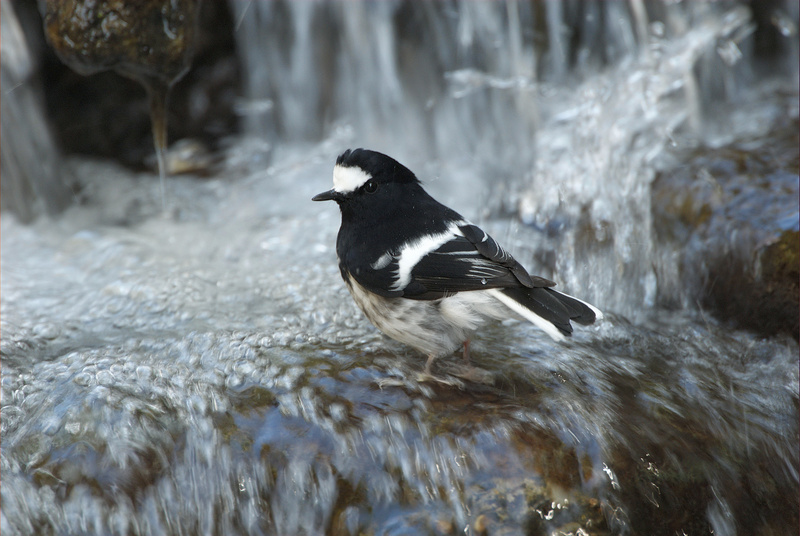
- Little forktail (Enicurus scouleri)

Scientific classification
- Kingdom: Animalia
- Phylum: Chordata
- Class: Aves
- Order: Passeriformes
- Family: Muscicapidae
- Subfamily: Saxicolinae
- Genus: Enicurus; Temminck, 1822

Type species
- Enicurus coronatus Temminck, 1822

= Forktail =

Forktails

Genus of birds (Enicurus)

The forktails are small insectivorous birds in the genus Enicurus. They were formerly placed in the thrush family, Turdidae, but are now treated as part of the Old World flycatcher family, Muscicapidae. Their common name derives from their long forked tail.

These are southeast Asian forest species principally associated with mountain forests and streams. Most nest in rock crevices, laying 2–4 eggs.

== Taxonomy ==
The genus Enicurus was introduced in 1822 by the Dutch zoologist Coenraad Jacob Temminck to accommodate Enicurus coronatus, the white-crowned forktail, which is therefore the type species. Temminck's epithet is considered to be a junior synonym as four years earlier in 1818 Louis Vieillot had coined the binomial name Turdus leschenaulti for the same species. The genus name combines the Ancient Greek henikos meaning "singular" with -ouros meaning "-tailed".

The following cladogram showing the relationships between the species is based on a molecular phylogenetic study of the Old World flycatchers published in 2023. The Bornean forktail (Enicurus borneensis) was not included.

- Enicurus
  - - Little forktail, Enicurus scouleri
    - - Spotted forktail, Enicurus maculatus
      - Slaty-backed forktail, Enicurus schistaceus
  - - - Black-backed forktail, Enicurus immaculatus
      - White-crowned forktail, Enicurus leschenaulti
    - - Sunda forktail, Enicurus velatus
      - Chestnut-naped forktail, Enicurus ruficapillus

== Species ==
The genus contains the following ten species:

- Little forktail, Enicurus scouleri – mountains of eastern Uzbekistan and northeastern Afghanistan through the Himalayas eastward to southeastern China and Taiwan, and southward to northern Indochina
- Javan forktail, Enicurus leschenaulti – Java and Bali
- Northern forktail, Enicurus sinensis — north-east India to Southeast Asia
- Malayan forktail, Enicurus frontalis — Malay Peninsula, Sumatra and Borneo
- Bornean forktail, Enicurus borneensis – mountains of northern Borneo
- Spotted forktail, Enicurus maculatus – east Afghanistan to central-south Vietnam
- Sunda forktail, Enicurus velatus – montane Sumatra and Java
- Chestnut-naped forktail, Enicurus ruficapillus – southern Myanmar to southern Thailand, Malaya, Sumatra, and Borneo
- Black-backed forktail, Enicurus immaculatus – rocky streams of northern India to Myanmar, southwestern China, and northwestern Thailand
- Slaty-backed forktail, Enicurus schistaceus – rocky mountain streams of northern India to southern China and southeastern Asia
