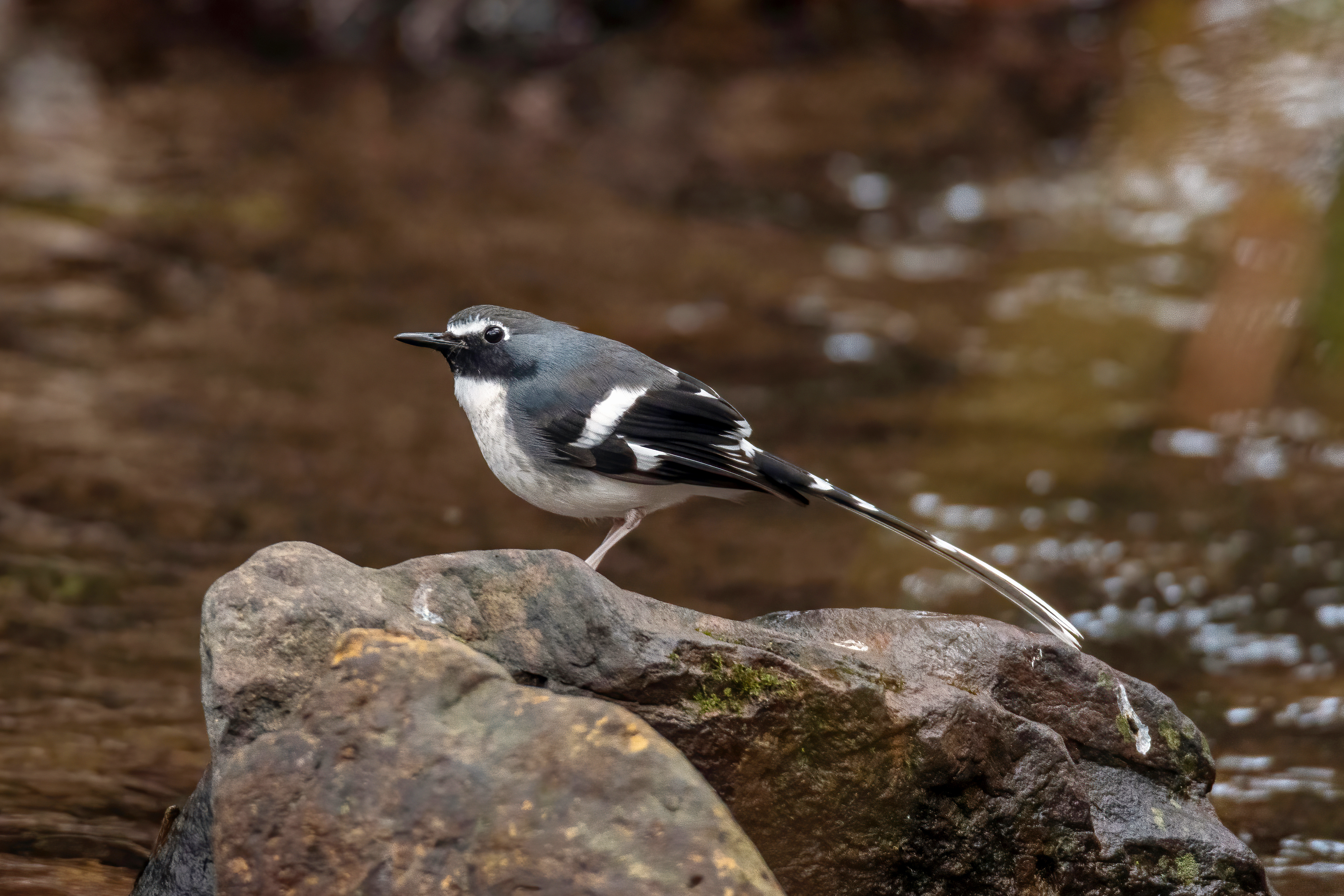
- in Godawari, Nepal.

Conservation status
- Least Concern (IUCN 3.1)

Scientific classification
- Kingdom: Animalia
- Phylum: Chordata
- Class: Aves
- Order: Passeriformes
- Family: Muscicapidae
- Genus: Enicurus
- Species: E. schistaceus

Binomial name
- Enicurus schistaceus (Hodgson, 1836)

= Slaty-backed forktail =

Species of bird

The slaty-backed forktail (Enicurus schistaceus) is a species of forktail in the family Muscicapidae. A slim, medium-sized forktail, it is distinguished from similar species by its slate grey forehead, crown, and mantle. It has a long and deeply forked tail banded in black and white, a white rump, and a white bar across its primary feathers; the rest of the plumage is predominantly white. The sexes look alike. The bird frequents the edges of fast-flowing streams and rivers, where it hunts small invertebrates by hopping among rocks or flying out over the water. It breeds between February and July, laying 3–4 pinkish, bluish, or white eggs; both sexes incubate the eggs.

The slaty-backed forktail is found near streams and rivers in tropical and subtropical regions, occasionally straying further from flowing water to the edges of roads and trails. Generally a solitary bird, it may occasionally be found in pairs, or in family groups in the breeding season. One of its calls has been described as similar to that of the Blyth's kingfisher, for which it has been mistaken. The forktail is found in the central and eastern Himalayas, the Indian Sub-continent, southern China and continental Southeast Asia. Its wide distribution and apparently stable population have led to it being classified as a species of least concern by the International Union for Conservation of Nature.

== Taxonomy and systematics ==
The slaty-backed forktail was described scientifically in 1836 by British naturalist Brian H. Hodgson. It was originally placed in a new subgenus Enicurus in the genus Motacilla, which contains the wagtails. The specimen used to describe the species came from Nepal. The species name is the Latin adjective schistaceus "slaty-grey". The slaty-backed forktail is currently placed within the family Muscicapidae, which includes Old World flycatchers and chats. A genetic study found that the slaty-backed forktail and the little forktail were genetically more distinct from the white-crowned forktail than were other forktail species.

== Description ==
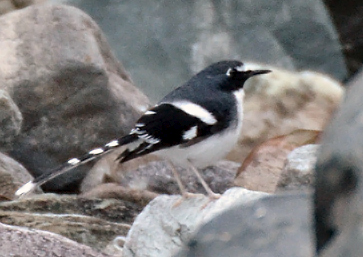
Slaty-backed forktail at Dibang Valley, Arunachal Pradesh, India.

The slaty-backed forktail is a slim, medium-sized forktail between 22 and 25 centimetres (8 5/8 and 9 7/8 in) long, and weighs between 26 and 38 grams (0.92 and 1.34 oz). It is coloured slate-grey, black, and white. The bill is black, while the feet of the bird are a pale pinkish or greyish colour. The iris has been described as dark brown, though it has been recorded as black in certain specimens. It has a black throat and a narrow white stripe across its face till just behind the eyes, sometimes describe as a white mask. The white stripe sometimes includes a white eye ring, which may be either complete or partial. Its ear coverts, chin, and face are also black. The forehead, crown, sides of the neck, and the scapulars are slate grey. It has black wing-coverts, a white patch at the base of the primaries, wide white bars on otherwise black wings, and also a large white patch on its rump and lower back. The bases of the flight feathers are white, which is occasionally visible as a little additional bar on the wing. The tail of the bird is long and evenly graduated, with a deep fork. The tail is largely black except for a white tip. It also has three white bands along its length, formed by the white tips of shorter tail feathers.

The juvenile of the species lacks a white forehead, is brown above, and has dark scales on its breast. The tail of the juvenile is shorter than that of the adult: juveniles also have greyish or yellowish lores, and greyish or white chin and throat. The flanks are a dull grey-brown. It is not sexually dimorphic. Some specimens have been observed to have white tips to their primaries. This feature has been hypothesized to be the result of aging or of wear and tear, and has been observed throughout the distribution of the species. It is known not to be sex-related. Though very similar to the black-backed forktail Enicurus immaculatus, it is distinguished by its slate-grey mantle and crown, from which it gets its name. It also has a slightly larger bill than the black-backed forktail, and slightly less white on its forehead.

=== Vocalisation ===
One of the slaty-backed forktail's calls has been described as a "high, thin, sharp, metallic screech, ''teenk'", similar to that made by a small kingfisher; in particular, it has been mistaken for the call of the Blyth's kingfisher Alcedo hercules. Another call is described as a mellow "cheet". It also produces a repeated, harsh screeching call when alarmed.

== Distribution and habitat ==
The slaty-backed forktail is found near fast-flowing water bodies in tropical and sub-tropical montane broadleaf forests, as well as near cultivated areas. These include rocky streams and rivers, including broad rivers and valleys in plains areas. A 2000 paper studying birds in northwest India and Nepal found that the incidence of slaty-backed forktails decreased with altitude. The study also found that the slaty-backed forktail had a preference for streams that were bordered by dense and complex vegetation, and had firm and stable banks of earth. They also preferred streams with finer grained sand on the bottom, and with "pool–riffle sequences." More rarely the bird is seen in secluded areas of the forest, and on the sides of roads or trails near the water. In winter months it has been observed to move from the mountains into foothills and plains areas.

The species is found in the central and eastern Himalayas, from the Indian state of Uttarakhand in the west to Myanmar in the East, including Nepal, and Bhutan. It is a vagrant in Bangladesh. It is also found in southern China, in southeast Tibet, and in the provinces of Sichuan, Yunnan, Guizhou, Fujian and Zhejiang, and possibly in Hainan. Its range in South-East Asia includes Thailand, Vietnam, Laos, Cambodia, peninsular Malaysia, and Hong Kong. In Hong Kong, it is only an occasional winter visitor or highly uncommon resident. Its distribution in southeast Asia is discontinuous. The elevational range of the slaty-backed forktail varies geographically. It has been estimated as 300-1600m above sea level in northern India, 900–1675 in Nepal, 400–1800 in southern China and the adjacent areas of Thailand, above 500m in Cambodia, above 800m in Malaysia, and 800-2200m in Bhutan. In the winter, it has been recorded as low as 200m above sea level.

The range of the species has not been precisely determined, but is known to be very large. The population is thought to be stable, and though its size is not precisely known, it is thought to be greater than 10,000 individuals. It is categorized as a species of least concern by the International Union for Conservation of Nature. It is common in the parts of its range that occur in China, Nepal, and South-East Asia.

== Behaviour and ecology ==
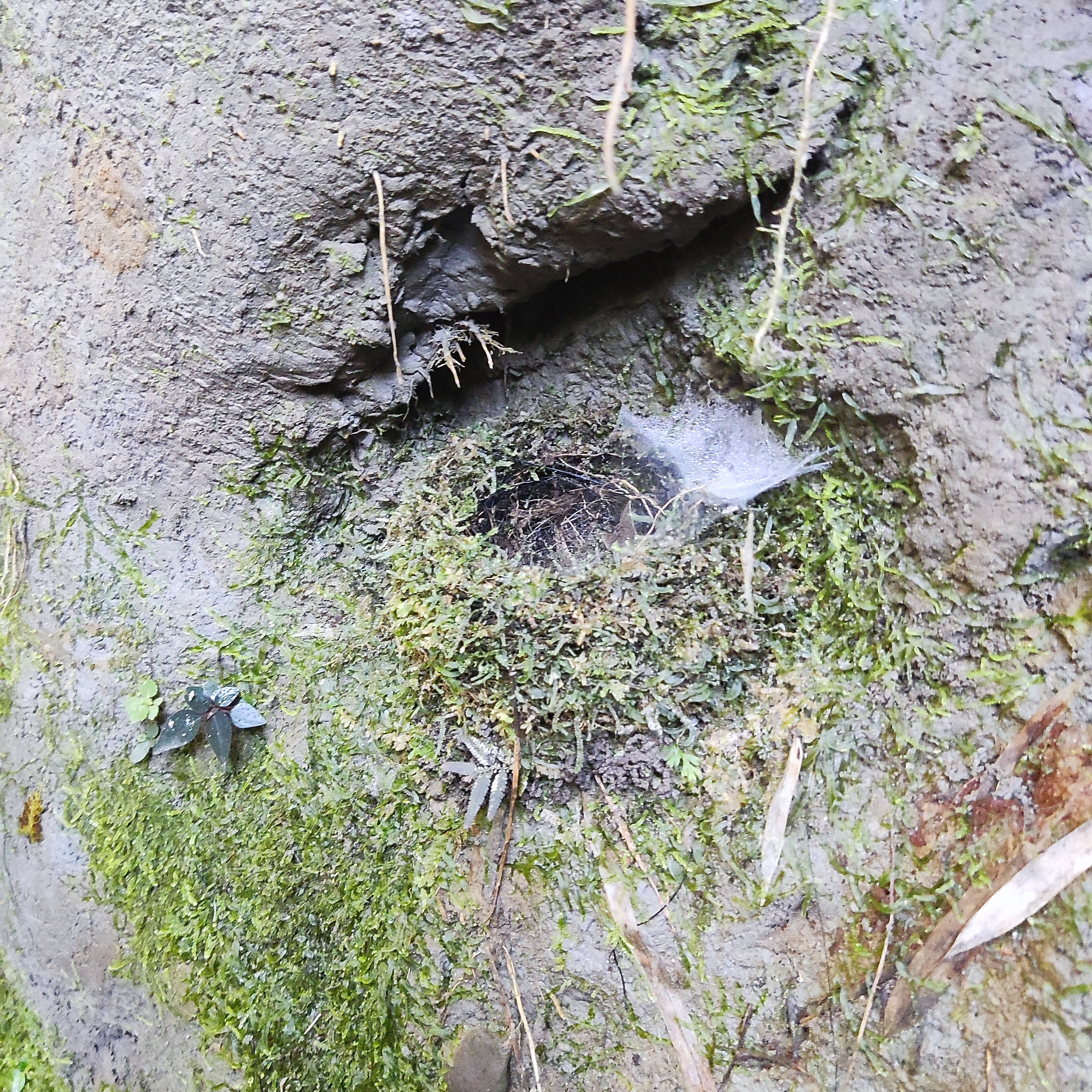
A disused nest from Northeast India

The slaty-backed forktail breeds between February and July; the breeding period does not appear to vary across its range. It builds a nest with materials including bryophytes, leaves, and grass. The shape of the nest can be a cup or part of a dome, depending on where it is built. It frequently has an outer layer of mud. The nest may be constructed in holes in the ground or in the trunks of trees, between the roots of trees, in hollows of dead trees, and sometimes within crevices in rocks. The bird lays three to four eggs that vary from pure white to pinkish white to bluish white, with lavender or reddish brown spots. The spots are more common on the larger end of the egg. Both sexes incubate the eggs. The species is thought to have two or three broods in a year.

The species feeds on small invertebrates found in or around the water, including larvae and crustaceans. It forages at the edge of the water, and is described as "moving restlessly". It forages on and among rocks at the edges of the water as well as in mid-stream; it will occasionally enter the water as well. Though it generally forages by hopping in an agile manner among rocks, it also makes brief forays above the water to snatch food items from the surface. Its flight is described as similar to that of a large wagtail; quick and direct, and slightly undulating. It is seen mostly near the water; usually solitary, it is occasionally observed in pairs, and is described as a shy bird. It constantly bobs its tail, and when disturbed it may raise and open its tail with a quick scissor-like movement. In the breeding season is occasionally in small family groups, while in winter it is most often solitary. However, many birds may forage in a favored section of a stream: 15 birds have been observed along a single stretch of the river in Bhutan.

In the South-East Asian parts of its range the bird is sedentary, while in the Himalayas it is observed to move over an elevational gradient. A 1998 study found that the species moved locally in response to rising water levels in the monsoon season.
