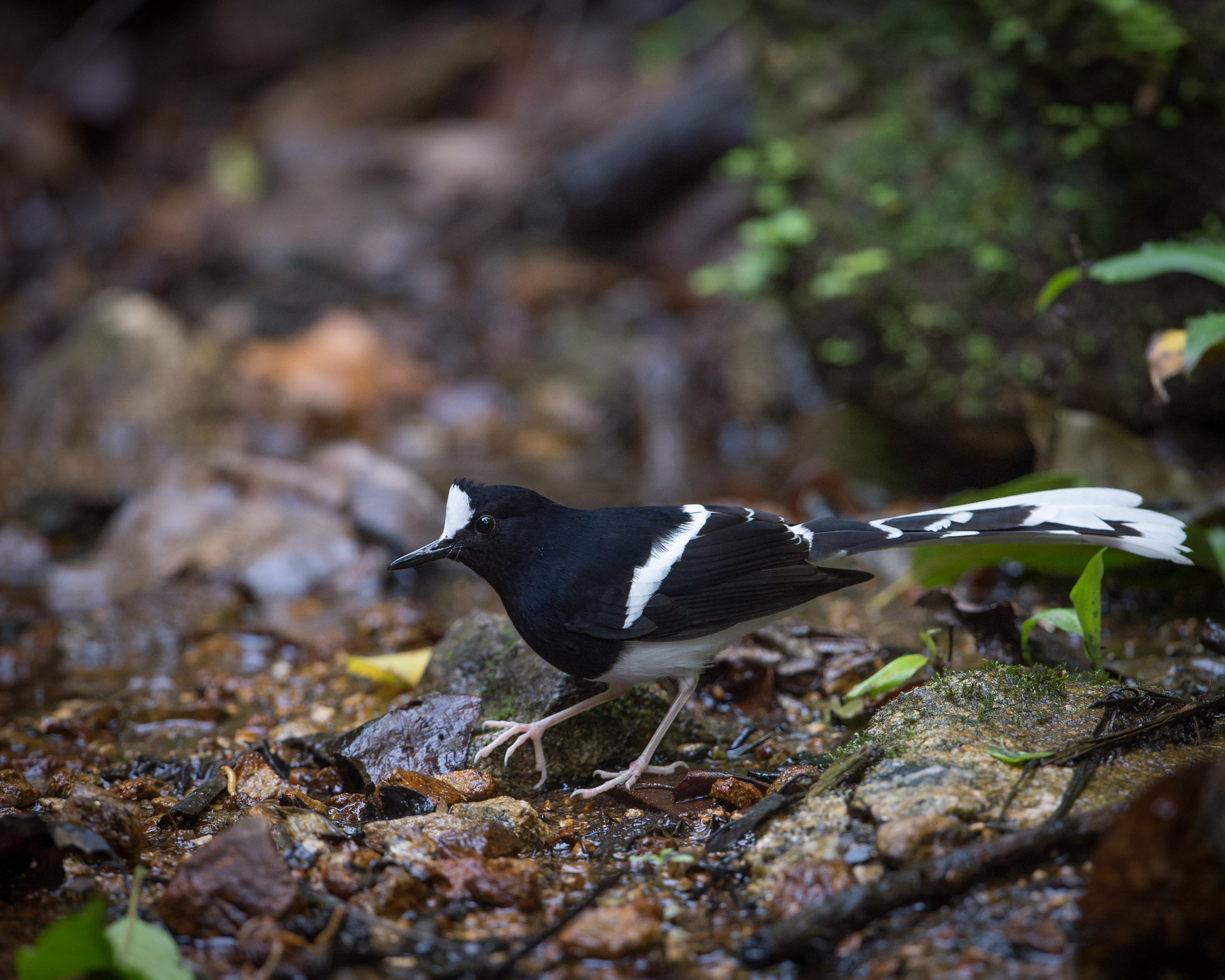

Conservation status
- Least Concern (IUCN 3.1)

Scientific classification
- Kingdom: Animalia
- Phylum: Chordata
- Class: Aves
- Order: Passeriformes
- Family: Muscicapidae
- Genus: Enicurus
- Species: E. leschenaulti

Binomial name
- Enicurus leschenaulti (Vieillot, 1818)

= Javan forktail =

Species of bird

The Javan forktail or white-crowned forktail (Enicurus leschenaulti) is a species of forktail in the family Muscicapidae. Formally described in 1818, it is endemic to Indonesia. The largest of the forktails, Enicurus leschenaulti, is between 25 and 28 centimetres (9.8 and 11.0 in) long. It has a black throat and breast, black mantle, and largely black wings. The rump and lower back are white, and the bird has a prominent white crown, from which it gets its name. As with other forktails, the tail is long, deeply forked, and banded in black and white. A variety of whistling and clicking calls have been described. Slight morphological differences have been observed between subspecies.

A shy bird, the white-crowned forktail stays near water, and forages on the edges of rivers and streams for invertebrates. Its breeding season is between March and September, and possibly extends till October. Its nests are also built near the water, and are constructed of plant material. The eggs are between two and five in number, though there is latitudinal variation. Multiple broods in a year have been observed in China. Its natural habitats are subtropical or tropical moist lowland forests and subtropical or tropical moist montane forests. Its elevational range varies across its range, from a minimum of 185 metres (607 ft) above sea level to a maximum of 2,400 metres (7,900 ft). It is categorized as a species of least concern by the International Union for Conservation of Nature.

== Taxonomy ==
The white-crowned forktail was formally described in 1818 by French ornithologist Louis Vieillot based on a specimen that had been collected in Java. Vieillot placed it with the thrushes in the genus Turdus and coined the binomial name Turdus leschenaulti. The specific epithet was chosen to honour the French naturalist and collector Jean-Baptiste Leschenault de La Tour. The white-crowned forktail is now one of eight forktails placed in the genus Enicurus that was introduced in 1822 by the Dutch zoologist Coenraad Jacob Temminck.

The species was found to be more distantly related to the slaty-backed forktail and the little forktail than to other forktail species. The precise geographic delineation between E. l. borneensis and E. l. frontalis is not known. It is closely related to the Bornean forktail (Enicurus borneensis) which replaces it in mountain areas of Borneo. E. borneensis was previously considered a sixth subspecies of the white-crowned forktail. It is genetically distinct from the white-crowned forktail, but morphologically similar.

== Description ==
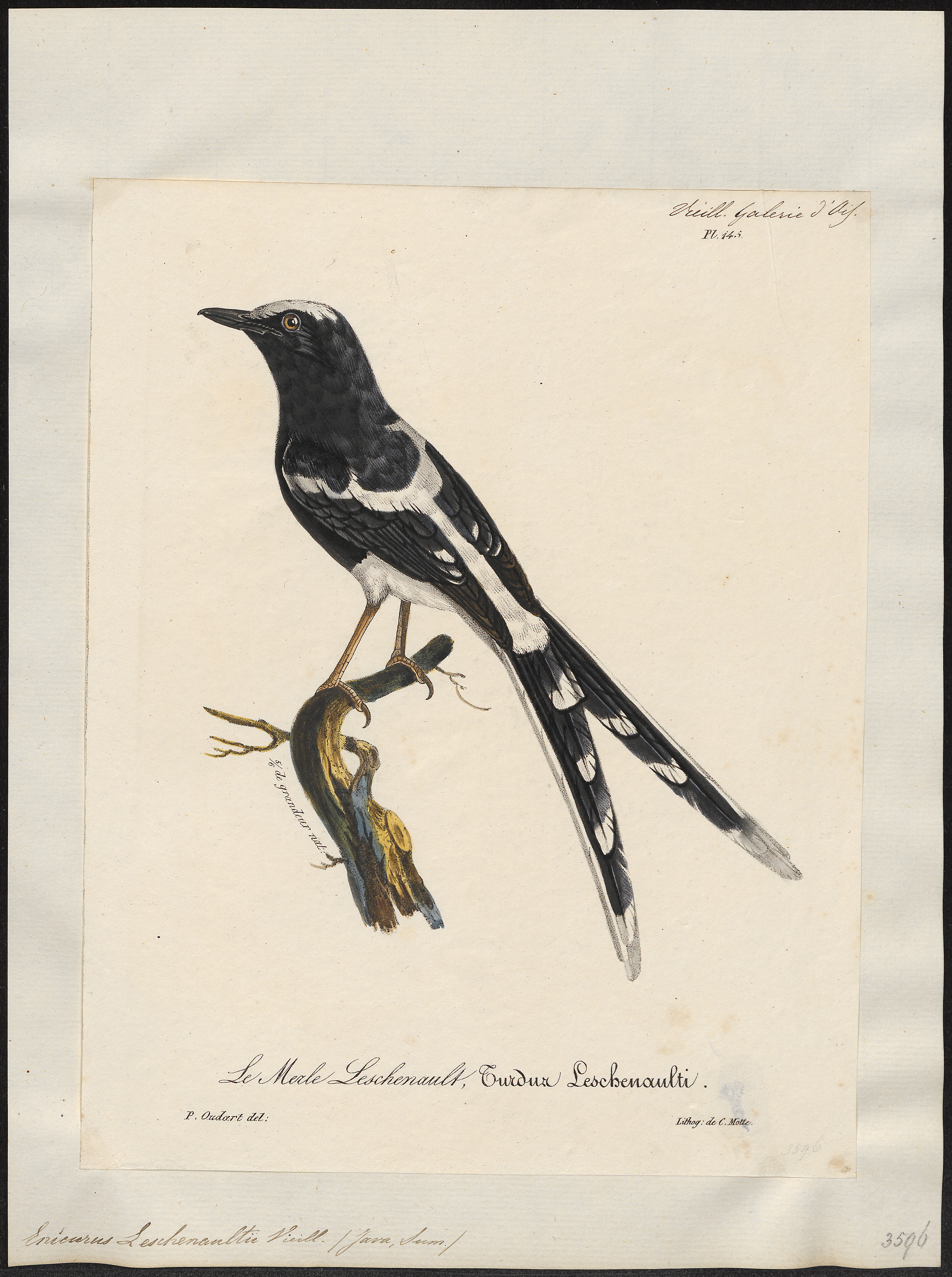
A white-crowned forktail, painted sometime between 1825 and 1834

The white-crowned forktail is the largest of the forktails. Between 25 and 28 centimetres (9.8 and 11.0 in) long, the white-crowned forktail typically weighs between 27 and 38 grams (0.95 and 1.34 oz), though specimens weighing up to 53 grams (1.9 oz) have been reported. It has black feathering on its throat extending down to its breast, as well as a black face and scapulars. The crown and forehead have a prominent white patch, sometimes visible as a slight crest, from which the bird gets its name. The belly of the bird is white, and is sharply delineated from the throat and face. The lower back and rump of the bird are white. The tail of the species is long and evenly graduated, with a deep fork. It has white tips, and the outer feathers are white. It also has three narrower white bands created by the tips of shorter tail feathers. The wings of this species are largely black with a prominent white band across the greater coverts. Juveniles of the species have brownish black upperparts, breast, and throat, brown flanks, and brown mottling on the belly. They also lack the prominent white crown. The bill of the species is black, while the feet are pinkish in color.

Its mantle is completely black, a feature used to distinguish the species from the spotted forktail, which has a speckled mantle, and from the slaty-backed forktail, which has a slate-grey mantle. It is distinguished from the black-backed forktail by its longer tail and larger size. The subspecies frontalis is somewhat smaller than the others, and the extent of white on its crown is smaller: E. borneensis is similar to frontalis but has a longer tail.

Multiple calls have been observed. The alarm call and contact calls are high-pitched, ringing lengthy whistles, described as "tseee, tseee" or "zweeet": these calls are repeated multiple times, with pauses in between. The alarm call is harsher and more emphatic, described as "scree" or "scree chit chit". Males use a long and complex whistled song when displaying or exhibiting territorial behavior; this often consists of a long whistle that fades away, followed by shorter whistles, clicking or chacking noises, or bell-like sounds. The call of the borneensis subspecies is slightly different from the others.

== Distribution and habitat ==
The habitat of the white-crowned forktail is subtropical or tropical regions in moist lowland forests and moist broadleaf montane forests. As is the case with other forktail species, the white-crowned forktail frequents fast-flowing rivers, waterfalls, and streams within the forests, though it may move to slower moving water sources in the winter. It also frequents damp areas and pools within the forest, including animal wallows, swampy areas, and water ditches. It may be found along slower-moving rivers and streams in the lowland regions of its distribution. It prefers areas screened by dense vegetation.

The white-crowned forktail is only found on the islands of Java and Bali in Indonesia. Though the population of the species is not precisely known, it is thought to be greater than 10,000 individuals, and is estimated to be stable. It is categorized as a species of least concern by the International Union for Conservation of Nature.

== Behaviour and ecology ==
As with other forktails, the white-crowned forktail keeps close to water. It has been observed to frequently wag its tail. It forages along the edges of streams and in the water, primarily for insects, such as black beetles, water crickets, springtails, and caterpillars. Described as a shy bird, it flies close to the ground, usually calling as it does. It is thought to shift its elevational range slightly with the time of year.

The white-crowned forktail breeds between the months of March and September, and possibly till October. The breeding period varies slightly across its range. Eggs have been recorded as early as March in Borneo, and on one occasion a parent with a fledgling was recorded in February. The nest is constructed of moss, plants, leaves, and wood fibre, and is in the shape of a large cup. It is usually located near or over the water, and occasionally in forest gullies nearby. It is usually placed in a hole in a bank or cliff, or among tree roots, and has been observed to have been constructed behind waterfalls, with the birds flying through the water to reach their nest. The location of the nest is always damp.

The species usually lays between two and five eggs, which are creamy, pinkish, or greyish white, and covered in speckles of red-brown, salmon, and lilac.
