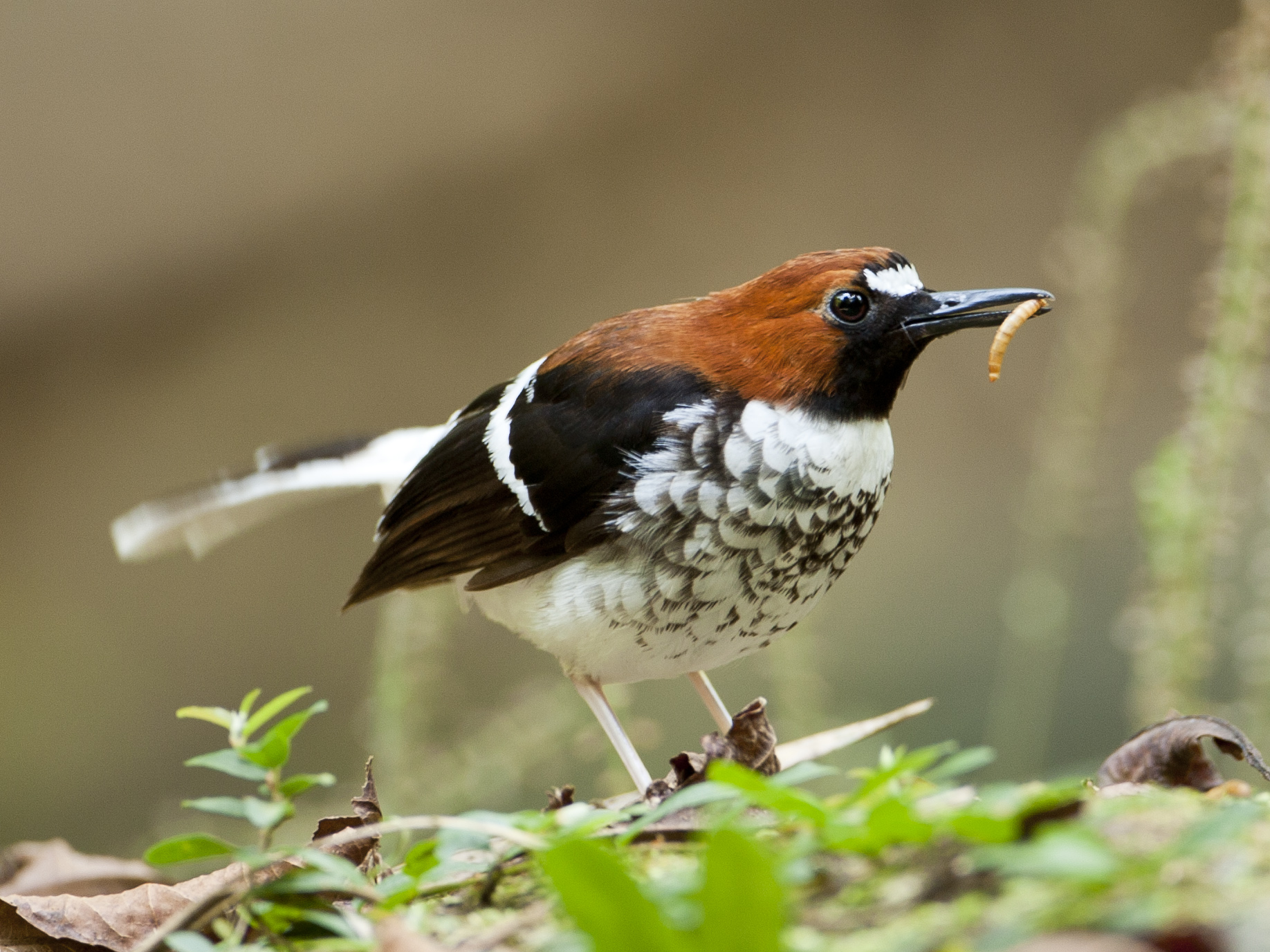

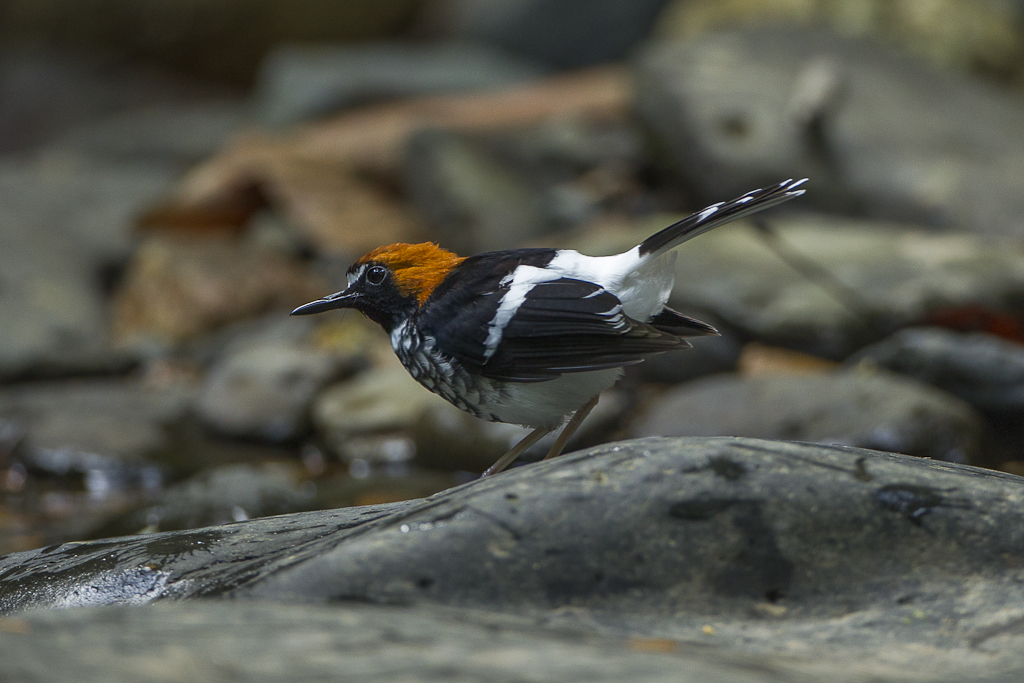
- Female (above) and male (below)

Conservation status
- Near Threatened (IUCN 3.1)

Scientific classification
- Kingdom: Animalia
- Phylum: Chordata
- Class: Aves
- Order: Passeriformes
- Family: Muscicapidae
- Genus: Enicurus
- Species: E. ruficapillus

Binomial name
- Enicurus ruficapillus Temminck, 1832

= Chestnut-naped forktail =

Species of bird

The chestnut-naped forktail (Enicurus ruficapillus) is a species of bird in the flycatcher and chat family Muscicapidae. The species is monotypic, having no subspecies. It is found in Sundaland, in southern Burma and Thailand to Peninsular Malaysia, as well as Sumatra and Borneo. The species is not migratory.

== Habitat and distribution ==
The species is found along clear rivers and streams in lowland and hill rainforest. It can also be found in secondary scrub, dry ridges, and along logging roads. It is found from sea-level to 1,300 m (4,300 ft), except in southern Thailand, where it only reaches 900 m (3,000 ft).

== Description ==
The chestnut-naped forktail is 18 to 20 cm (7.1–7.9 in) long and weighs 27 g (0.95 oz). The head of the male is chestnut-coloured, with a white forehead and black mask in front of the eye. The wings are black with a white wing-bar. The breast is white with black barring, fading towards the white belly. The rump is white and the tail is black with white stripes and a white tip. The female is the same as the male except the back and mantle is chestnut. The chestnut-naped forktail calls in flight, either a single or three whistles.

== Behaviour ==
Chestnut-naped forktails forage near water, eating a range of insects including earwigs, beetles, ants and caterpillars. They have also been recorded eating snakes. The nest is a cup of plant fibres, lined with leaf skeletons and decorated on the outside with moss. The nest is fixed with mud to a boulder or bank. The clutch size is 2 eggs, which are white or pale pink and marked with reddish-brown speckles and purple undermarkings. This species is a host to brush cuckoos.

== Status ==
It is threatened by habitat loss, as lowland forest is rapidly being cleared across its range. It is expected to remain in hill habitat, and is classed as near threatened.
