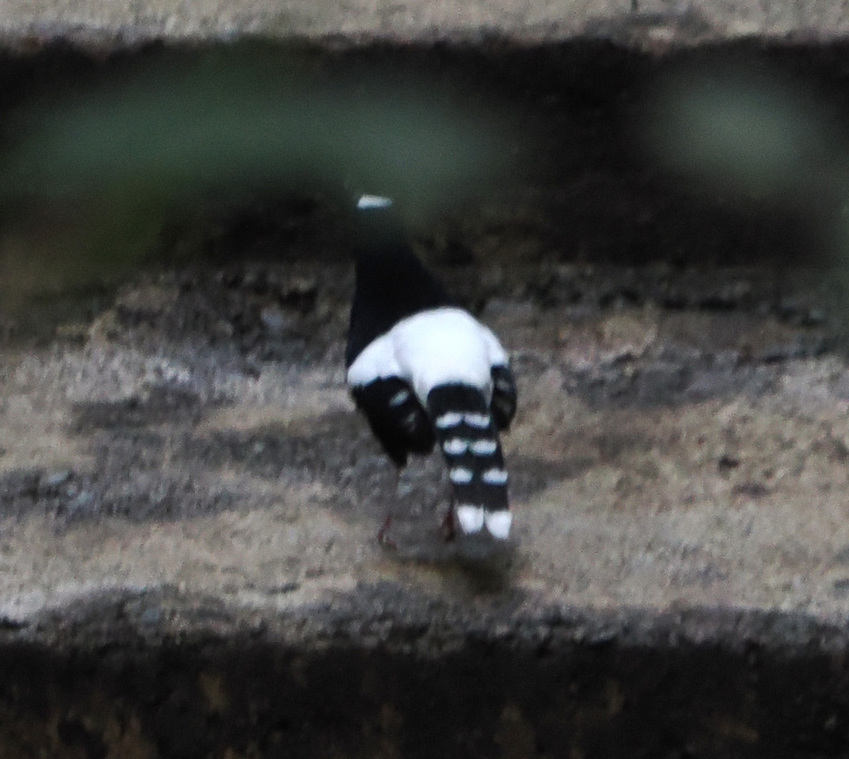

Scientific classification
- Kingdom: Animalia
- Phylum: Chordata
- Class: Aves
- Order: Passeriformes
- Family: Muscicapidae
- Genus: Enicurus
- Species: E. borneensis

Binomial name
- Enicurus borneensis Sharpe, 1889

= Bornean forktail =

Species of bird

The Bornean forktail (Enicurus borneensis) is a small, black and white bird, with a long and deeply forked tail, in the Old World flycatcher family. It is endemic to the Southeast Asian island of Borneo, where it occupies streamside habitats in montane primary forest.

== Taxonomy ==
It is closely related to the very similar white-crowned forktail (Enicurus leschenaulti) of which it is sometimes considered a subspecies, and from which it was split because of:

- a recognizably different type of mitochondrial DNA
- the reduced extent of the white forehead shield, which does not cover the crown
- its larger size and longer tail with four, rather than five, white tail patches
- different calls
- different habitat, with the Bornean forktail replacing the lowland dwelling white-crowned forktail in the mountains and in submontane areas.
