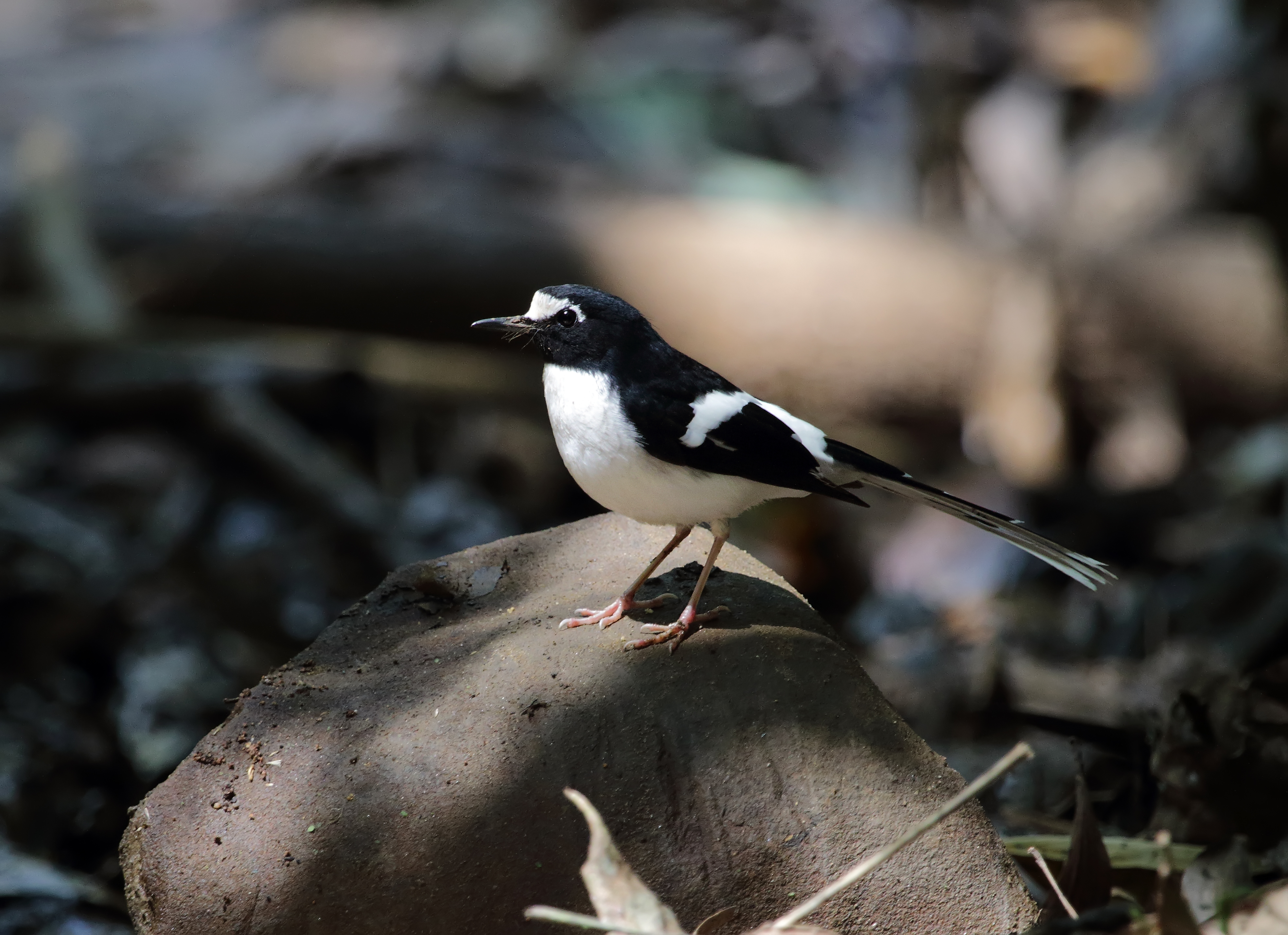

Conservation status
- Least Concern (IUCN 3.1)

Scientific classification
- Kingdom: Animalia
- Phylum: Chordata
- Class: Aves
- Order: Passeriformes
- Family: Muscicapidae
- Genus: Enicurus
- Species: E. immaculatus

Binomial name
- Enicurus immaculatus (Hodgson, 1836)

= Black-backed forktail =

Species of bird

The black-backed forktail (Enicurus immaculatus), occasionally referred to as the black-throated forktail, is a forktail species in the family Muscicapidae. The species was described in 1836, from a specimen collected in Nepal. It is a medium-sized forktail, weighing between 25 and 29 grams, with a length of 20.5 to 23 centimetres (8 1/8 to 9 in). The species has a broad white stripe across its forehead. The crown, face, and mantle are black, while the bird's underparts are white, sharply divided from the black above. The wings are largely black with a broad white stripe across the greater coverts. The tail of the species, similar to that of other forktails, is long, graduated, and deeply forked. The tail is black with a white tip and three white bands created by shorter tail feathers. The beak of the bird is black, while the feet and legs are light pink, and the iris is brown. The species is monomorphic.

The black backed forktail is solitary, but is occasionally found in pairs or in family groups. It is described as a shy species. The bird breeds between March and June, building a nest of plant matter in holes or crevices in rocks and dead trees. Three eggs are generally laid, which are pink and spotted with red-brown. Both sexes build the nest and incubate the eggs. The species frequents fast-flowing rivers and streams in temperate forests and subtropical or tropical moist lowland forests. It is found in the Indian subcontinent and in some adjoining regions of Southeast Asia. It ranges across Bangladesh, Bhutan, India, Myanmar, Nepal and Thailand. It is generally found below 1,450 metres (4,760 ft) above sea level, but has been recorded as high as 2,600 metres (8,530 ft). Its precise range and population are unknown. It is classified as a species of Least Concern by the International Union for Conservation of Nature.

== Taxonomy ==
British naturalist Brian H. Hodgson scientifically described the black-backed forktail in 1836, from a specimen obtained in Nepal. It was originally placed in a new subgenus Enicurus in the genus Motacilla, which contains the wagtails. Hodgson described the species as sharing the characteristics of the genera Motacilla and Turdus, having an intermediate morphology, a general shape closer to that of Turdus species, and behavior closer to that of Motacilla. The species is currently placed within the family Muscicapidae, which includes Old World flycatchers and chats. The species has been referred to as the black-throated forktail.

== Description ==
A medium-sized forktail, the black-backed forktail is between 20.5 and 23 centimetres (8 1/8 and 9 in). It weighs between 25 and 29 grams. The length of the wing has been recorded as between 8.6 and 9.8 centimetres (3 3/8 and 3 7/8 in) in the male and 8.6 to 9.0 centimetres (3 3/8 to 3 1/2 in) in the female. The bill extends 2 centimetres (3/4 in) from the skull, while the tail is between 12.4 and 12.7 centimetres (4 7/8 and 5 in) long.

The species has a broad white stripe beginning just behind the eyes and running across its forehead. The crown and mantle are completely covered in black feathering, which extends down to the upper forehead, face, scapulars, throat, and sides of the neck. The underparts of the bird are white, sharply delineated from the black of the throat. The lesser coverts and median coverts are completely black, as are the bases of the greater coverts. A broad white band runs across the wing, running across the greater coverts as well as the bases of the inner secondary and tertiary feathers. The highest tertial feather is white, and the inner primaries have white tips and the base of the secondaries are covered in a small white patch. The flight feathers are otherwise black. As with most other forktails, the tail of the species is long, graduated, and deeply forked. The feathers are black, with white tips, except for the outermost feathers, which are white. The tail has a white tip and three white bands created by the ends of shorter tail feathers. The beak of the species is black, while the feet and legs are whitish-pink or a light flesh colour. The iris is brown or dark brown.

The black-backed forktail does not exhibit sexual dimorphism, and has no known geographic variation in its appearance. Nothing is known of its moulting. Juveniles of the species lack the prominent white stripe across the forehead, and the areas that are black on the adult are sooty brown or dull black. Juveniles have a white spot behind the eye, and may have dark scales or speckles on its flanks, breast, and belly. The tail of the juvenile is usually shorter, while the mandible is yellowish, and the maxilla have whitish cutting edges.

The bird is similar to the slaty-backed forktail, but lacks the slaty back of the latter, and is also smaller in size. It also has a slimmer bill. The white band on its face is narrower than that of the otherwise similar white-crowned forktail: it is also distinguished by its white, rather than black, breast. Field identification guides describe it as being the same size as bulbul species. Its call is described as a short and whistled "tseep - dew" or "hurt-zeee". The two syllables of this call are sometimes produced separately, as a hollow "huu" and a shrill "zeee", which are somewhat higher pitched than the call of the slaty-backed forktail. It produces a two syllable call when disturbed. It also makes a call similar to that of the slaty-backed forktail, described as being reminiscent of a squeaky hinge. It has been described as occasionally producing a short song as well.

== Behavior and ecology ==
The species is solitary, or occasionally found in pairs, but may be seen in family groups during the breeding season. Described as a shy bird, it often bobs its tail when feeding, and when at rest opens and closes it with a scissor-like motion. It habitually flies along the course of a river or stream, and its flight is described as quick and straight, occasionally undulating slightly. It has been observed near waterfalls. The precise diet of the black-backed forktail is unknown, but it has been observed to consume aquatic insects, the larvae of these insects, and crustaceans. It typically forages along fast-moving streams and rivers, including on rocks in midstream, and may occasionally enter the water. It may also forage along slower-moving rivers, ponds, or forest pools, and has been recorded as foraging in damp areas of the forest. When inactive, it has been observed to remain in bushes or low shrubbery.

The breeding season of the black-backed forktail is between March and June. The nest consists of a cup constructed of plant matter, including dried leaves, moss, and fibres, sometimes lined with leaf skeletons. It may be located in the hole of a dead tree, under a bank, on a ledge, or in a hole or cleft among rocks. Usually, three eggs are laid, which are pinkish and sparsely specked with fine red-brown. The speckles occasionally form blotches or caps at the end of the eggs. The eggs have been recorded as averaging 2.08 centimetres (7/8 in) in length and 1.58 centimetres (5/8 in) in width. Both male and female birds participate in the construction of the nest and in incubation. Though the species is largely sedentary, first-year birds disperse from their parental breeding areas between April and October.

== Range and distribution ==
The black-backed forktail's habitat of choice is near fast-flowing rivers and streams in moist tropical broadleaf forest and subtropical lowland forest. It frequents rocks and boulders within or bordering streams, as well as mud or sand banks bordering rapidly moving stretches of water. The western end of the species's range is in Garhwal, in the northwest portion of the Indian state of Uttarakhand. The range extends from there through western and central Nepal to Bhutan and the northeastern Indian states, including Sikkim, Assam, Meghalaya, Arunachal Pradesh, Nagaland, and Manipur. It is known as a winter visitor to Nameri National Park in Assam. West of Sikkim the species is uncommon, but it is common in Bhutan. It is also found in the Sylhet and Chittagong regions of Bangladesh, where it is uncommon. The range extends to Myanmar, except for the region of Tenasserim, and to northwestern Thailand. It has also been reported from southwestern Yunnan in China, and from southeastern Tibet. Birdlife International maps its range as being contiguous over these regions, except for an area in south Myanmar separated from the rest of the range. Field guides for birds in south Asia describe its distribution as discontinuous.

In the western part of its range the species is found up to 1,450 metres (4,760 ft) above sea level; in the eastern part, up to 900 metres (2,950 ft) above sea level. In Nepal its elevational range is described as 75 to 1,370 metres (250 to 4,500 ft) above sea level. In 1998 the species was recorded at 2,600 metres (8,500 ft) above sea level in Eaglenest Wildlife Sanctuary in Arunachal Pradesh. It breeds largely below 600 metres (1,970 ft) in India and Bhutan. The population of the species is unknown, but is believed to be stable, and larger than 10,000 individuals. Its precise range is also unknown, but is thought to be larger than 20,000 square kilometres. These estimates have led to its being classified as a species of Least Concern by the International Union for Conservation of Nature.

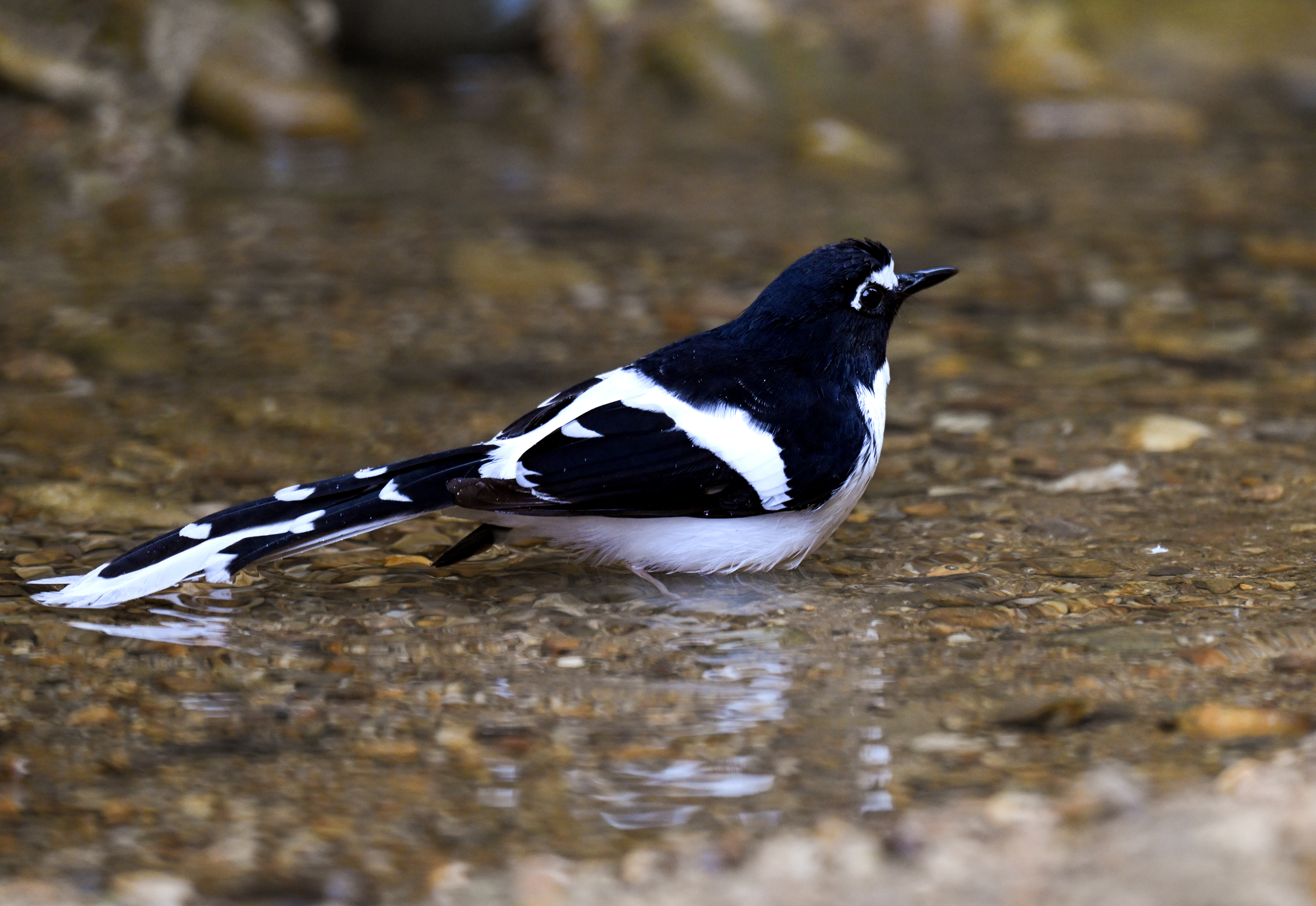
Dulung Reserve Forest, Assam
