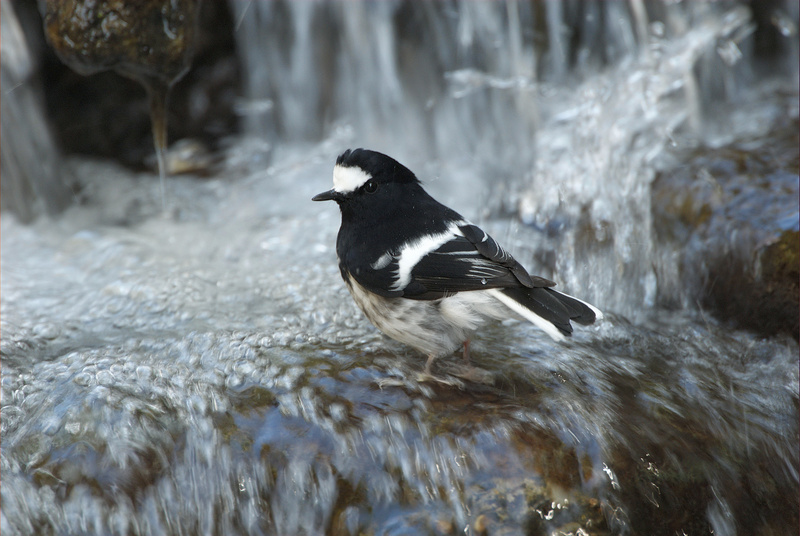

Conservation status
- Least Concern (IUCN 3.1)

Scientific classification
- Kingdom: Animalia
- Phylum: Chordata
- Class: Aves
- Order: Passeriformes
- Family: Muscicapidae
- Genus: Enicurus
- Species: E. scouleri

Binomial name
- Enicurus scouleri Vigors, 1832

= Little forktail =

Species of bird

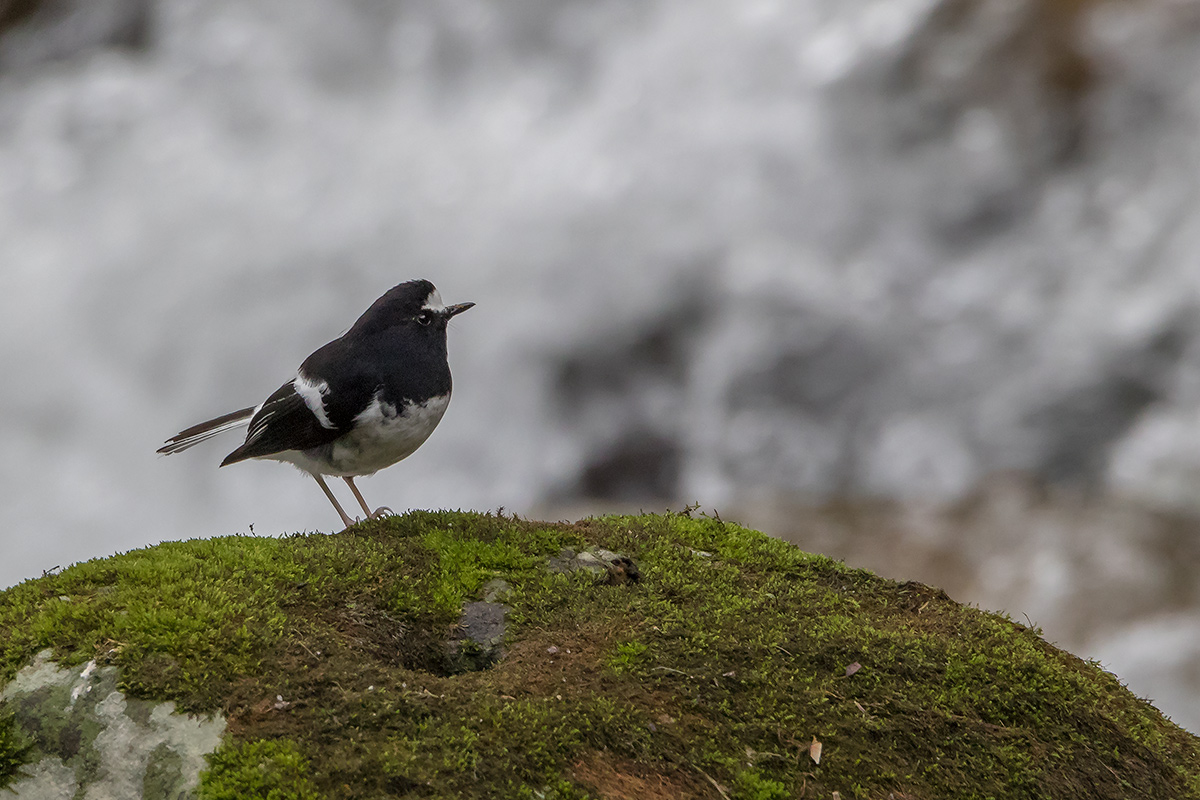
Little Forktail in Sikkim India

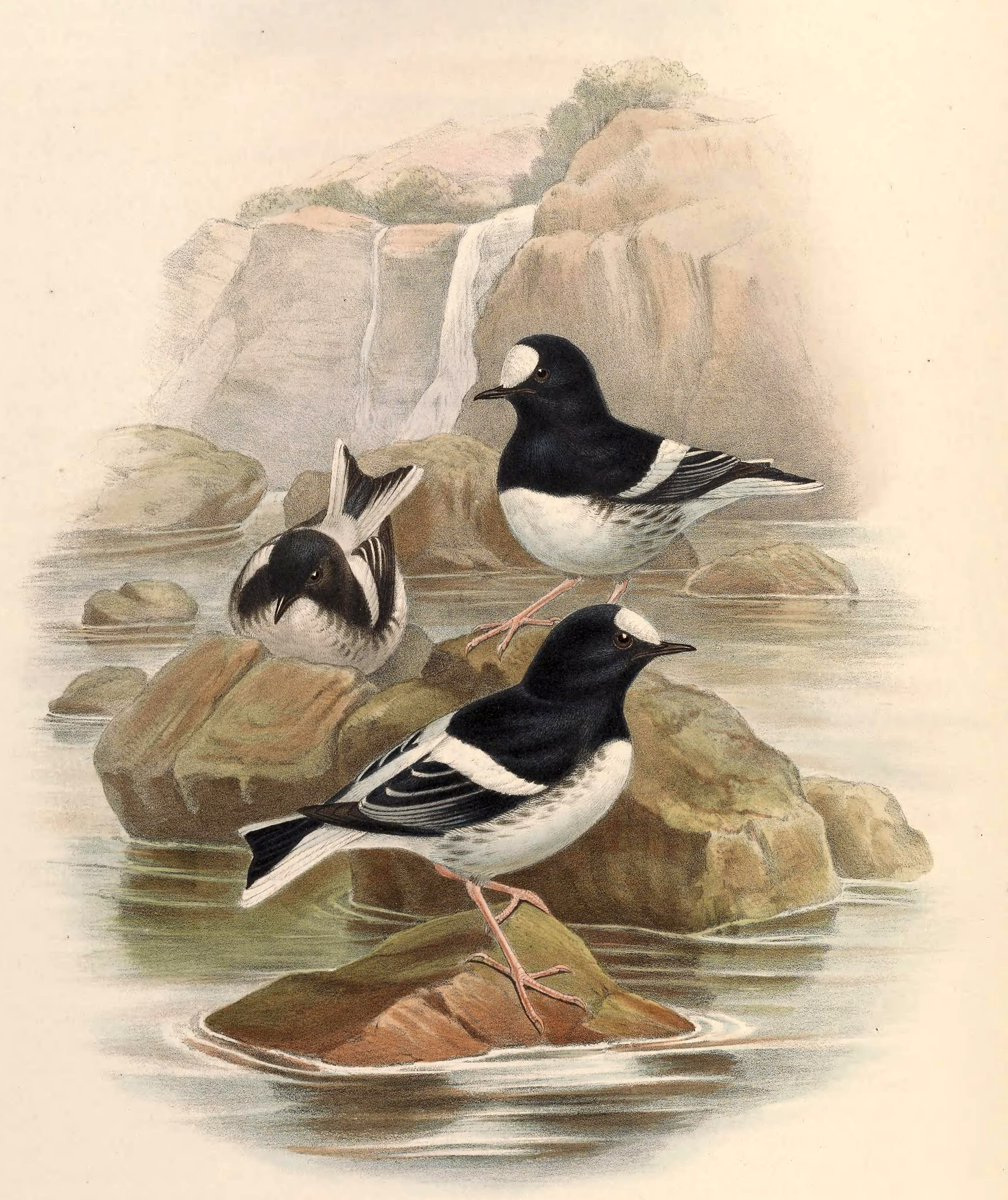

The little forktail (Enicurus scouleri) is a species of bird in the family Muscicapidae. The specific name commemorates Dr. John Scouler of Glasgow.

== Description ==
The sexes are alike, with black and white plumage. Black above, with white forehead; white band in wings extends across lower back, small, black rump patch; slightly forked, short tail with white in outer feathers; black throat, white below.

== Distribution and habitat ==
The little forktail is a bird of mountain streams, waterfalls and small shaded forest puddles; breeding between 1200-3700m. It is found in the Tian Shan and Himalayan mountain ranges, southern China and Taiwan. Its natural habitats are subtropical or tropical moist lowland forest and subtropical or tropical moist montane forest.

== Behaviour ==
They are either solitary or found in pairs. They forage energetically on moss-covered and wet slippery rocks. Their diet consists primarily of aquatic insects, and they plunge underwater to pursue prey. It constantly wags and flicks its tail, occasionally launching short sallies. They are generally silent, save for a rarely uttered sharp 'TZitTzit' call.
