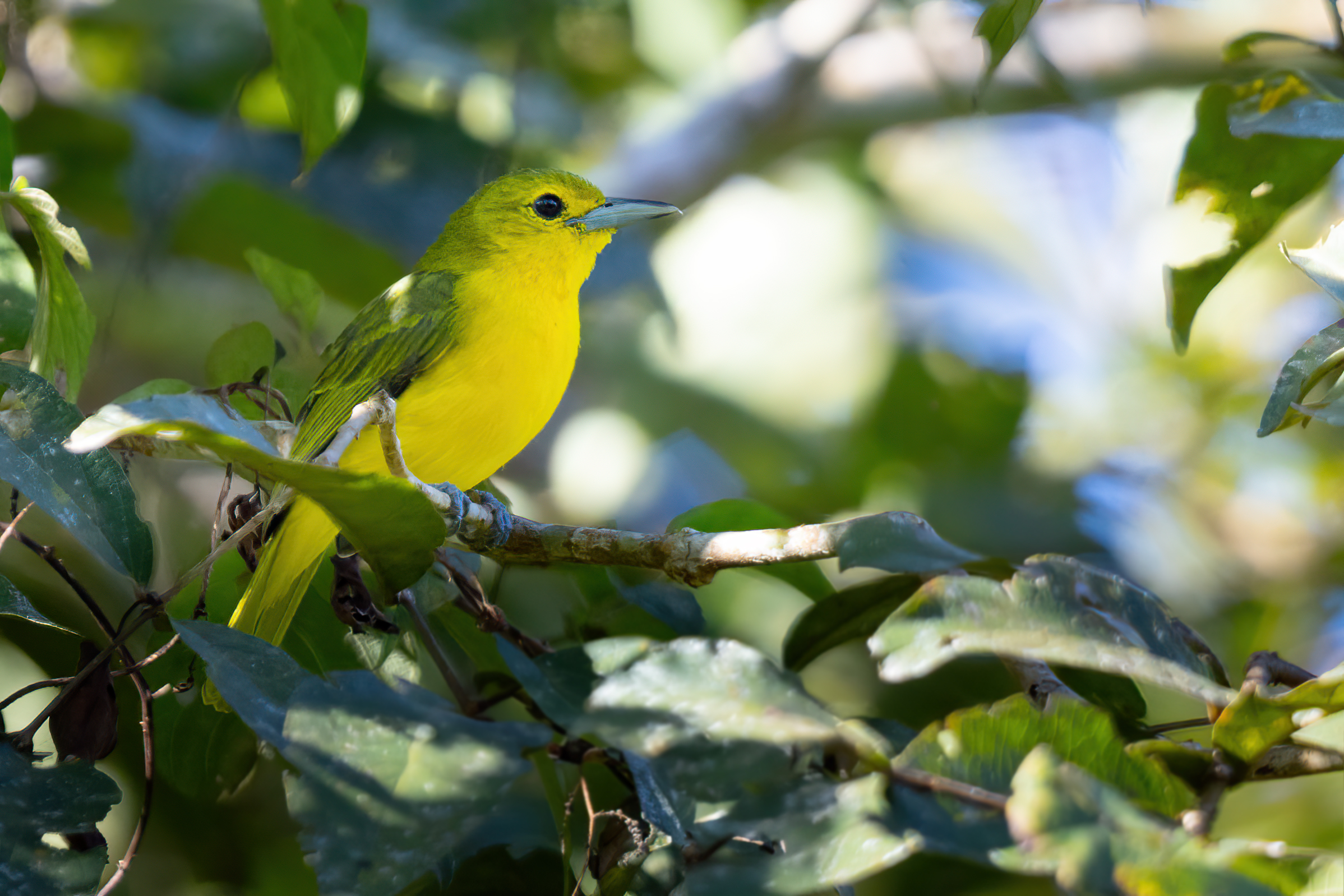

Conservation status
- Least Concern (IUCN 3.1)

Scientific classification
- Kingdom: Animalia
- Phylum: Chordata
- Class: Aves
- Order: Passeriformes
- Family: Aegithinidae
- Genus: Aegithina
- Species: A. lafresnayei

Binomial name
- Aegithina lafresnayei (Hartlaub, 1844)

= Great iora =

Species of bird

The great iora (Aegithina lafresnayei) is a species of bird in the family Aegithinidae. It is found in Cambodia, China, Laos, Malaysia, Myanmar, Thailand, and Vietnam. Its natural habitat is subtropical or tropical moist lowland forest.
