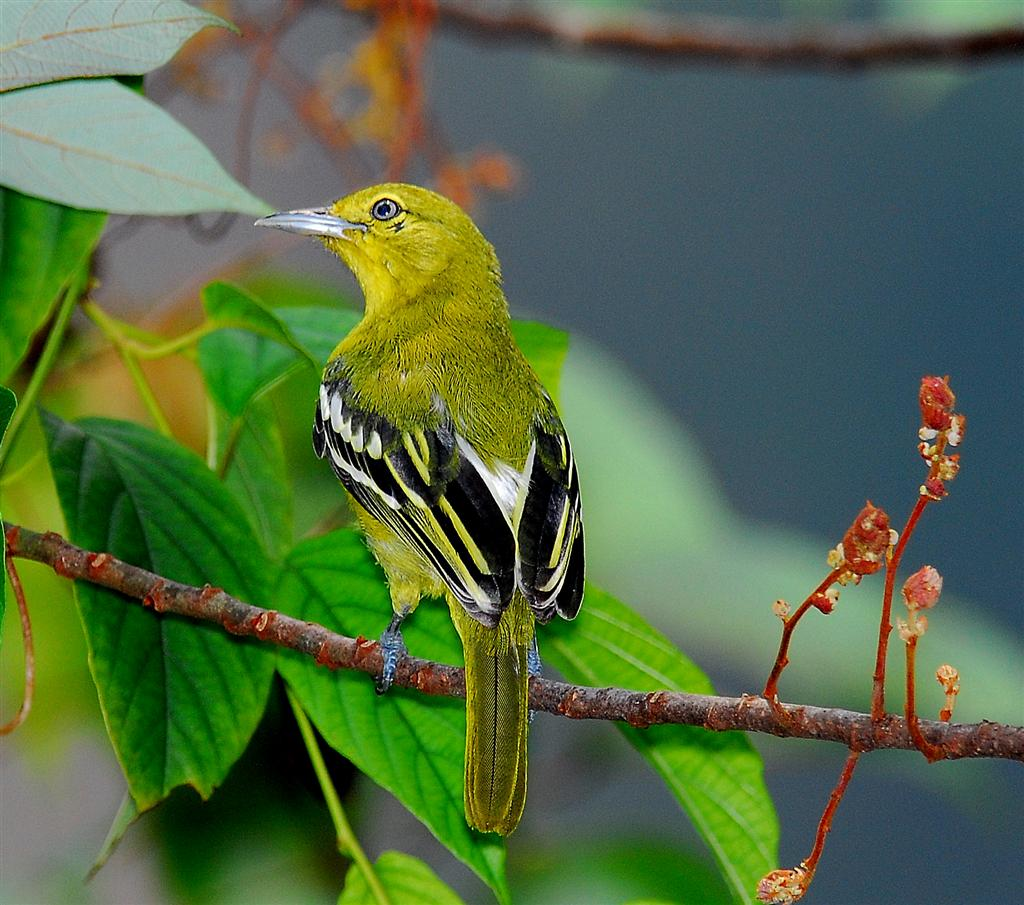
- Common iora (Aegithina tiphia)

Scientific classification
- Kingdom: Animalia
- Phylum: Chordata
- Class: Aves
- Order: Passeriformes
- Superfamily: Malaconotoidea
- Family: Aegithinidae; G.R. Gray, 1869
- Genus: Aegithina; Vieillot, 1816

Type species
- Motacilla tiphia Linnaeus, 1758

Species
- See text

= Iora =

Ioras

Genus of birds

The ioras are a small family, Aegithinidae, of four passerine bird species found in south and southeast Asia. The family is composed of a single genus, Aegithina. They were formerly grouped with the leafbirds and fairy-bluebirds, in the family Irenidae.

== Taxonomy and systematics ==
The genus Aegithina was introduced in 1816 by the French ornithologist Louis Pierre Vieillot to accommodate the common iora. The genus name is from Ancient Greek aigithos or aiginthos, a mythical bird mentioned by Aristotle and other classical authors. The common iora was described in 1758 and given the binomial name Motacilla tiphia by Carl Linnaeus, but there was some confusion as to which bird Linnaeus was referring. Early taxonomists considered it to variously be a warbler, flycatcher, finch or babbler. When G. R. Gray erected the family Aegithinidae in 1869 he included a number of babbler genera in it with the ioras. Edward Blyth, working in the 1850s, was the first to connect the ioras with the leafbirds and fairy-bluebirds, and included all these with the bulbuls.

=== Species of Aegithinidae ===
Image	Common name	Scientific name	Distribution
	Common iora	Aegithina tiphia	Indian subcontinent and Southeast Asia
	Marshall's iora	Aegithina nigrolutea	India and Sri Lanka.
	Green iora	Aegithina viridissima	Thai-Malay Peninsula, Sumatra and Borneo
	Great iora	Aegithina lafresnayei	Cambodia, China, Laos, Malaysia, Myanmar, Thailand, and Vietnam.

== Description ==
The ioras are small to medium small sized passerines, ranging from 11.5 to 15.5 cm (4.5–6.1 in) in length. Overall the males are larger than the females. These are reminiscent of the bulbuls, but whereas that group tends to be drab in colouration, the ioras are more brightly coloured. The group exhibits sexual dimorphism in its plumage, with the males being brightly plumaged in yellows and greens. Unlike the leafbirds, ioras have thin legs, and their bills are proportionately longer. Calls are strident whistles; songs are musical to human ears.

== Habitat and distribution ==
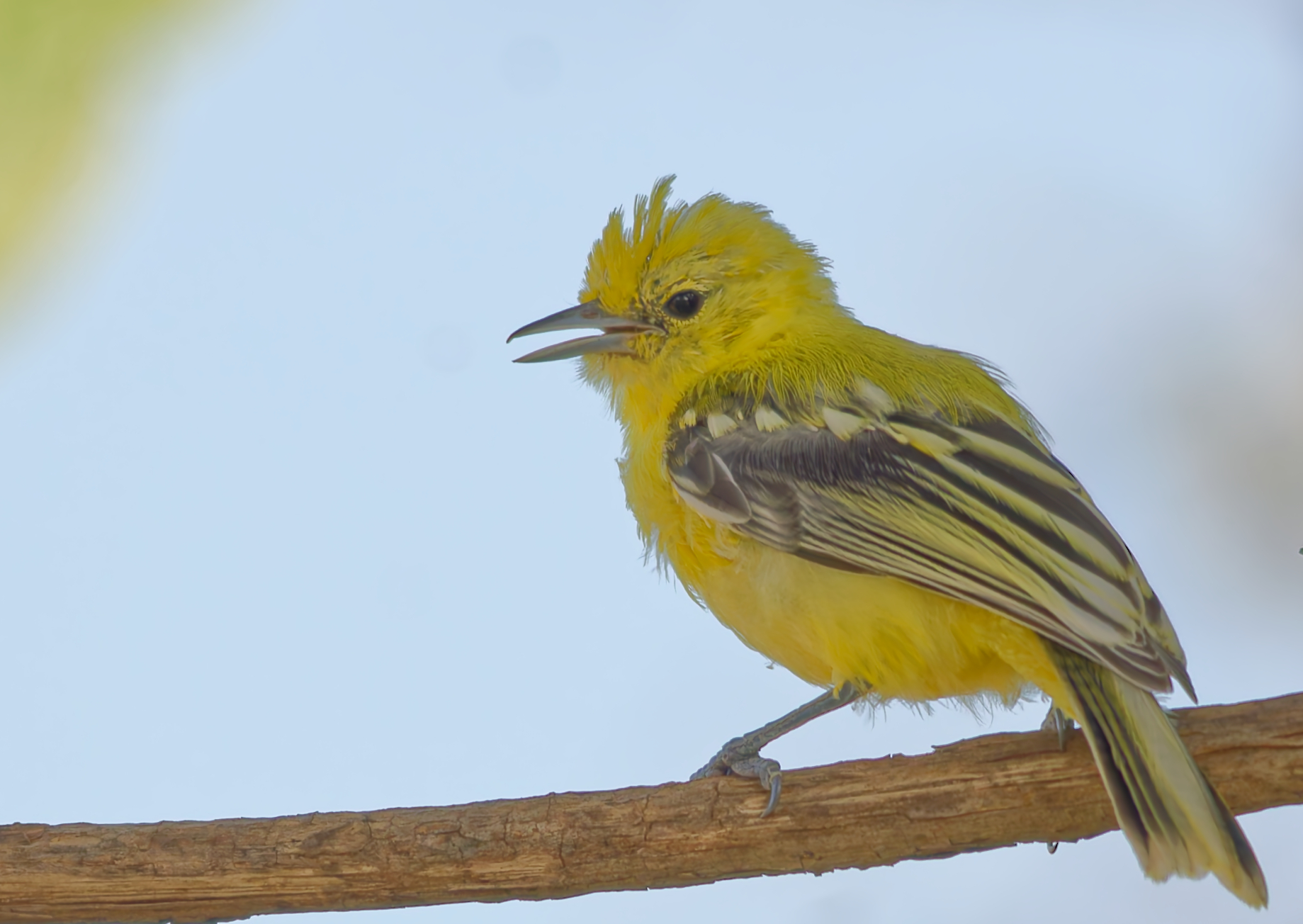
There is some evidence that Marshall's ioras may be migratory in some of their range

Their habitats include acacia scrub, forest edge, and closed forests, as well as agricultural land and (in the common iora) gardens. They are generally lowland birds, with most reaching only as high as the submontane forests. They are generally highly arboreal and usually occur in the tree canopy, with only very rare records of this family coming down to the ground. The family is overwhelmingly non-migratory, although in West India there is some evidence that Marshall's ioras and common ioras are partly migratory in the seasonal semi-desert fringe.

== Behaviour and ecology ==
Ioras eat insects and spiders, which they find by nimbly gleaning the leaves of the slenderest outer twigs.

In the two species whose male courtship displays are known, they are elaborate, culminating in the males' parachute-style descent looking like "green balls of fluff". The nests are compact open cups felted to branches with spiderweb. Females lay 2 or 3 eggs, which have pinkish speckles and red and purple lines. They incubate at night; the males, by day. Incubation lasts about 14 days. Both parents are responsible for brooding and feeding the chicks.

== Relationship with humans ==
Ioras will commonly live close to humans and even live in the suburbs of cites like Singapore. They are mostly not threatened by human activities, although the green iora is listed as near threatened by the IUCN, habitat loss being responsible for its decline. Unlike many other passerines they are not common species in the cage bird trade.
