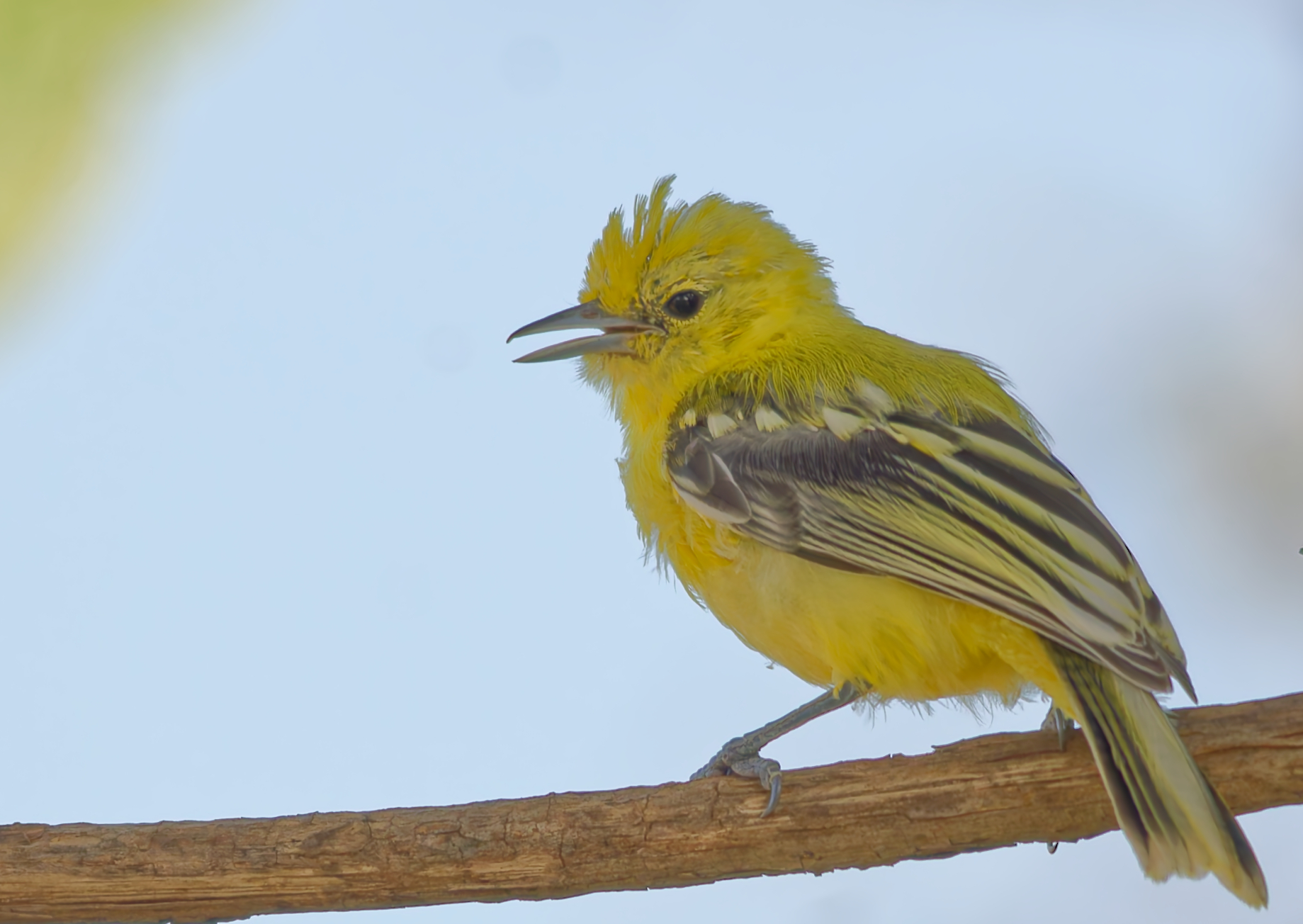
- at Rann of Kutch

Conservation status
- Least Concern (IUCN 3.1)

Scientific classification
- Kingdom: Animalia
- Phylum: Chordata
- Class: Aves
- Order: Passeriformes
- Family: Aegithinidae
- Genus: Aegithina
- Species: A. nigrolutea

Binomial name
- Aegithina nigrolutea (Marshall, GFL, 1876)
- Distribution records of A. nigrolutea

Synonyms
- Iora nigrolutea (protonym)

= Marshall's iora =

Species of bird

Marshall's iora (Aegithina nigrolutea), also known as the white-tailed iora, is a songbird in the genus Aegithina found in parts of India and Sri Lanka.

== Distribution and identification ==
The status of the species has been debated, and has only since 2003 returned to widespread acceptance at its original rank as a full species. Earlier suggestions have been that it was a clinal variant of the common iora Aegithina tiphia.

The diagnostic features of the species are the short wing and tail; white edging to tertials converging broadly at the tip, versus tertial tips black to only narrowly white in A. tiphia and a smaller and shorter bill than A. tiphia from any part of India. The vocalizations are also different. The species is best known from northwestern India, however a few verified specimen records exist from southern India. It is now also known from Sri Lanka.

There are some races of the common iora that may appear similar to this species:

Specimens showing nigrolutea characters collected within the range of Aegithina tiphia may be variants of the latter; such specimens have been obtained from southern Bihar, West Bengal, Khandesh, Tamil Nadu and Mysore. Two adult specimens collected from Gwalior are intermediate between Aegithina tiphia humei and Aegithina nigrolutea and one specimen from Ceylon is intermediate between the latter and Aegithina tiphia multicolor. The status of Aegithina nigrolutea as a distinct species is not settled. It is a problem that presents a challenge to geneticists and field workers alike

— Ali and Ripley

Salim Ali collected a specimen in the Biligirirangan Hills which was commented upon by Hugh Whistler:

One of the Biligirirangan birds, male, 15 September 1934 from Satyamangala (2,000' [600 m]) and evidently by the softness of the skull and the narrow tail feathers an immature bird, could not be distinguished from A. nigrolutea as the central tail is washed with white. I cannot believe that this is really nigrolutea which has not been recorded from nearer than northern Khandesh and Sambalpur. It is evidently an interesting case of individual variation showing how nigrolutea had its origin.

Whistler's comments have been subsequently debated and Daniel Marien notes that the southern boundary of the species is not well understood and further notes that the Biligirirangans specimen commented upon by Whistler was identified positively by Biswamoy Biswas as A. nigrolutea.

Adult females of both species are entirely green above, except for a black tail with white central feathers in A. nigrolutea, and yellow (dull in winter, brighter in spring) below. The juvenile and first-winter plumages in both sexes of both species are similar to their adult female plumages. First-year birds are best identified by their more pointed and somewhat narrower tail feathers.

Walter Koelz collected two adult specimens of the species at Salem, and the distribution range of the species is believed to overlap significantly with that of A. tiphia.

== Habits ==
The species is believed to have a courtship display not unlike that of the common iora. It breeds from June to August and nests low in a bush. It is presumed to be resident but little is known.
