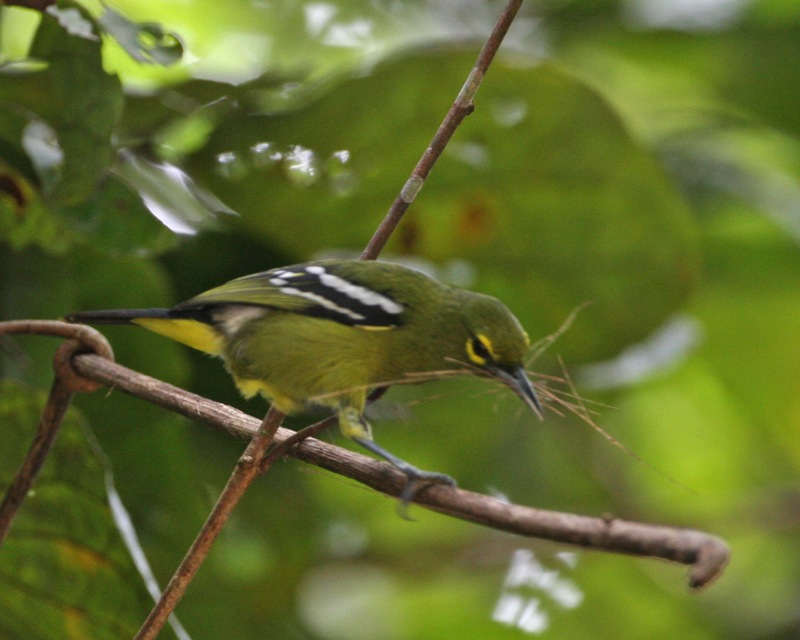

Conservation status
- Near Threatened (IUCN 3.1)

Scientific classification
- Kingdom: Animalia
- Phylum: Chordata
- Class: Aves
- Order: Passeriformes
- Family: Aegithinidae
- Genus: Aegithina
- Species: A. viridissima

Binomial name
- Aegithina viridissima (Bonaparte, 1850)

= Green iora =

Species of bird

The green iora (Aegithina viridissima) is a species of bird in the family Aegithinidae. It is found in the Thai-Malay Peninsula, Sumatra and Borneo. Its habitats include lowland forests, secondary forest and mangrove forest. It is threatened by habitat loss, and the International Union for Conservation of Nature (IUCN) has assessed it as near-threatened.

== Taxonomy ==
This species was described as Jora viridissima by Charles Lucien Bonaparte in 1850. Harry C. Oberholser described subspecies Aegithina viridissima thapsina from the Anamba Islands in 1917, noting its larger size and yellower plumage. These two subspecies are recognised by the IOC World Bird List, while Aegithina viridissima nesiotica described by Oberholser in 1912 is now included in the nominate subspecies.

== Description ==
The green iora is 12–14 cm (4.7–5.5 in) long. The male has black lores and bright yellow "eyelids" (a broken eye-ring). The face and upperparts are dark olive. The wings are black, with two white wing-bars on the covert feathers and olive-yellow margins on the flight feathers. The underparts are also dark olive, with lighter flanks and a yellow centre belly. The tail is black. The eyes are dark to red brown, the beak is grey-blue, and the feet are slaty blue. The female has yellow lores and a complete eye-ring. The upperparts and tail are medium olive. The wings are similar to those of the male but are washed olive, and the wing-bars are yellow instead. The underparts are olive green, with a yellow tint on the centre belly. The juvenile bird is similar to the female, but is paler.

== Distribution and habitat ==
This species is found in Tenasserim, the Thai-Malay Peninsula, Sumatra, Borneo and some small neighbouring islands, and it is locally extinct in Singapore. It lives in the canopy of lowland forests up to 820 m (2,690 ft) in elevation, and is also found in tall secondary forest, peat swamp forest and mangrove forest.

== Behaviour ==
This iora often occurs in pairs or small groups. It feeds on invertebrates, regularly joining mixed-species foraging flocks. The contact call is a whining, descending ji-sheur or ji-wier, and a ji-jirijiri-jeh mating call has been recorded. The green iora is usually sociable, but intense fighting has also been observed. Breeding has been recorded in April and May. The cup-shaped nest is built on a tree 8–12 m (26–39 ft) above the ground. Both the male and female incubate the eggs, and nestlings are brooded in rainy weather. Moulting has been recorded in July and August.

== Status ==
The population is probably declining because of habitat loss caused by logging and land conversion. The IUCN Red List has assessed it as a near-threatened species.
