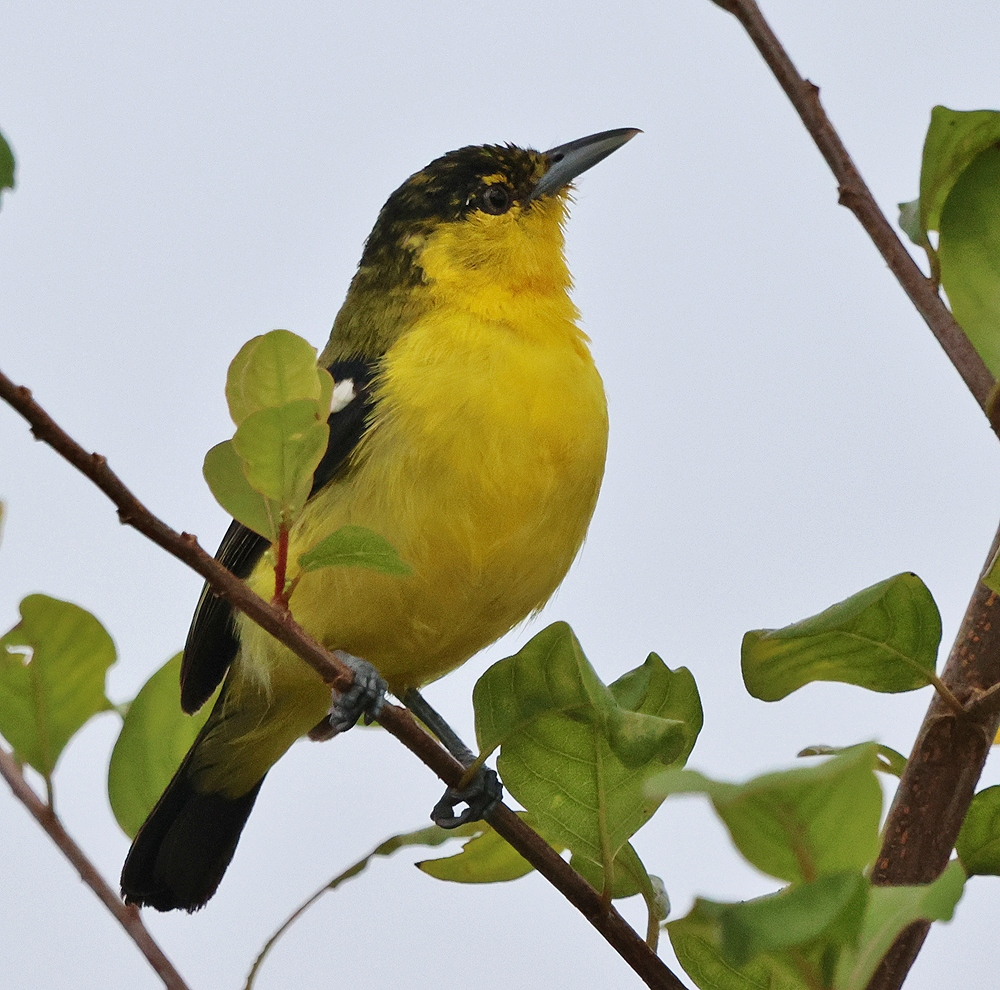
- Male
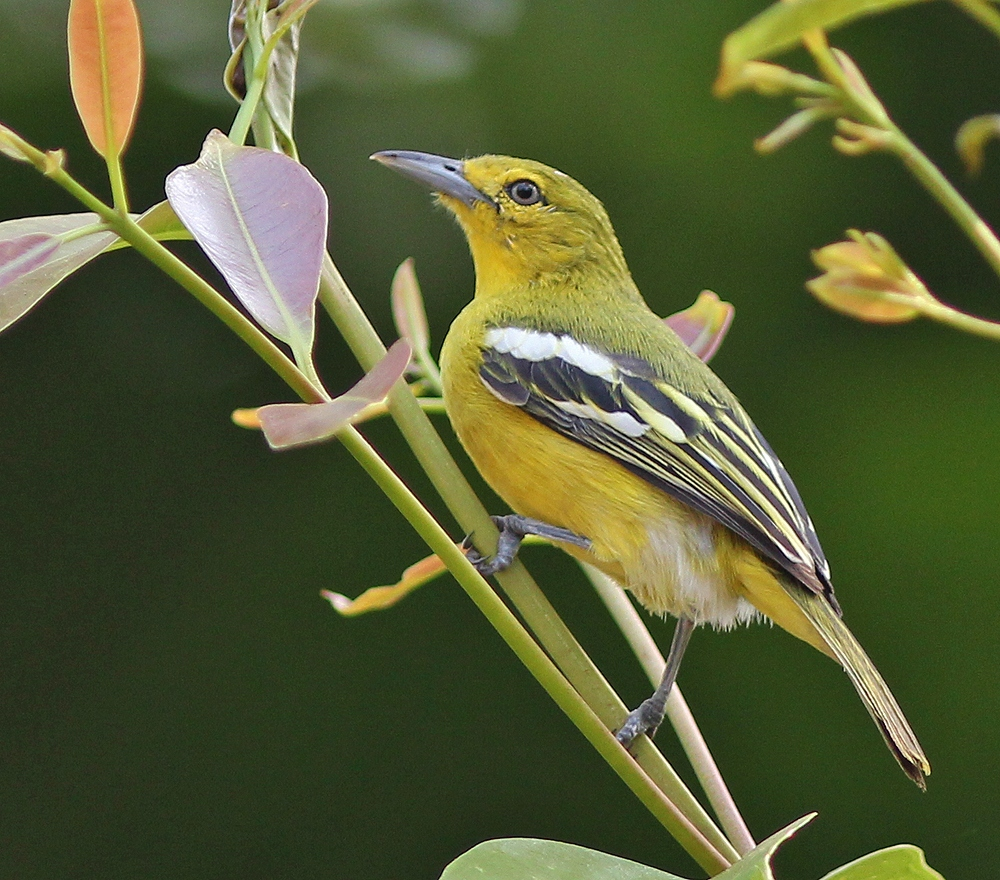
- Female

Conservation status
- Least Concern (IUCN 3.1)

Scientific classification
- Kingdom: Animalia
- Phylum: Chordata
- Class: Aves
- Order: Passeriformes
- Family: Aegithinidae
- Genus: Aegithina
- Species: A. tiphia

Binomial name
- Aegithina tiphia (Linnaeus, 1758)

Synonyms
- Motacilla tiphia Linnaeus, 1758

Audio
- Call of common iora

= Common iora =

Species of small passerine bird

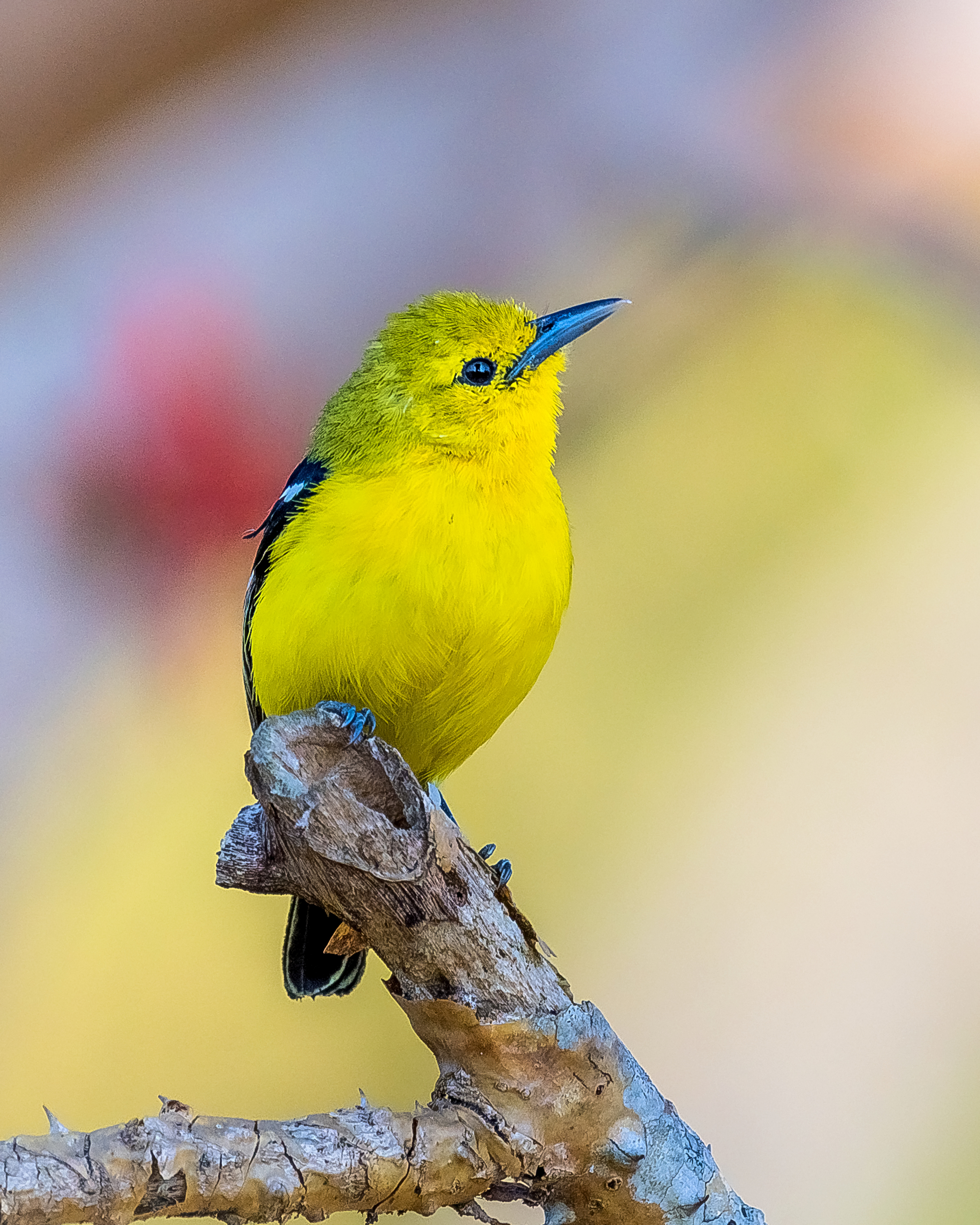
A. t. multicolor: female in Satchari National Park, Bangladesh

The common iora (Aegithina tiphia) is a small passerine bird found across the tropical Indian subcontinent and Southeast Asia, with populations showing plumage variations, some of which are designated as subspecies. A species found in scrub and forest, it is easily detected from its loud whistles and the bright colours. During the breeding season, males display by fluffing up their feathers and spiral in the air appearing like a green, black, yellow, and white ball.

== Taxonomy ==
In 1747 the English naturalist George Edwards included an illustration and a description of the common iora in the second volume of his A Natural History of Uncommon Birds. He used the English name "The Green Indian Fly-Catcher". Edwards based his hand-coloured etching on a specimen that had been sent from Bengal to the silk-pattern designer and naturalist Joseph Dandridge in London. When in 1758 the Swedish naturalist Carl Linnaeus updated his Systema Naturae for the tenth edition, he placed the common iora in the genus Motacilla. Linnaeus included a brief description, coined the binomial name Motacilla tiphia and cited Edwards' work. The common iora is now placed in the genus Aegithina that was introduced in 1816 by the French ornithologist Louis Pierre Vieillot. The genus name Aegithina is from Ancient Greek aigithos or aiginthos, a mythical bird mentioned by Aristotle and other classical authors. The etymology of specific epithet tiphia is uncertain. It may be from the Ancient Greek tuphē, tiara, from Tiphys who in Greek mythology was the helmsman of the Argonauts.

Eleven subspecies are recognised:

- A. t. multicolor (Gmelin, JF, 1789) – southwest India and Sri Lanka
- A. t. deignani Hall, BP, 1957 – south, east India and north, central Myanmar
- A. t. humei Baker, ECS, 1922 – central peninsular India
- A. t. tiphia (Linnaeus, 1758) – north India to west Myanmar
- A. t. septentrionalis Koelz, 1939 – northwest Himalayas
- A. t. philipi Oustalet, 1886 – south-central China, east Myanmar, north Thailand and north, central Indochina
- A. t. cambodiana Hall, BP, 1957 – southeast Thailand, Cambodia and south Vietnam
- A. t. horizoptera Oberholser, 1912 – southeast Myanmar and southwest Thailand, Malay Peninsula, Sumatra and nearby islands
- A. t. scapularis (Horsfield, 1821) – Java and Bali
- A. t. viridis (Bonaparte, 1850) – central, south Borneo
- A. t. aequanimis Bangs, 1922 – north Borneo and west Philippines

== Description ==
Ioras have a pointed and notched beak with a culmen that is straight. The common iora is sexually dimorphic, males in the breeding season have a black cap and back adding to a black wing and tail at all seasons. Females have greenish wings and an olive tail. The undersides of both are yellow and the two white bars on the wings of the male are particularly prominent in their breeding plumage. The males in breeding plumage have a very variable distribution of the black on the upperparts and can be confused with Marshall's iora, however, the latter always has white tips to the tail. The nominate subspecies is found along the Himalayas and males of this population are very similar to females or have only a small amount of black on the crown. In northwestern India, septentrionalis is brighter yellow than others and in the northern plains of India humei males in breeding plumage have a black cap and olive on the upper mantle. In southwestern India and Sri Lanka multicolor has the breeding males with a jet black cap and mantle. The forms in the rest of southern India are intermediate between multicolor and humei with more grey-green on the rump (formerly considered as deignani but now used for the Burmese population).

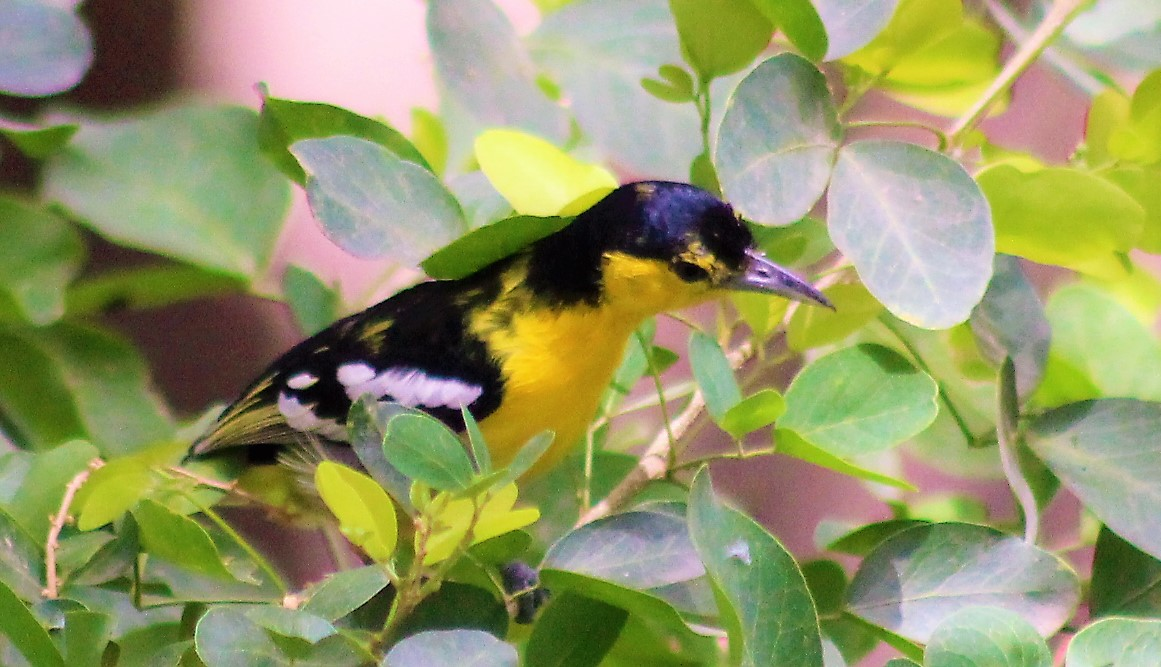
Common Iora, Male, Pune

Several other populations across Southeast Asia are designated as subspecies including philipi of southern China and northern Thailand/Laos, deignani of Myanmar, horizoptera of southern Myanmar and the island chain of Sumatra, cambodiana of Cambodia, aeqanimis of Palawan and northern Borneo, viridis of Borneo and scapularis of Java and Bali.

== Behaviour and ecology ==
Ioras forage in trees in small groups, gleaning among the branches for insects. They sometimes join mixed species feeding flocks. The call is a mixture of churrs, chattering and whistles, and the song is a trilled wheeeee-tee. They may sometimes imitate the calls of other birds such as drongos.

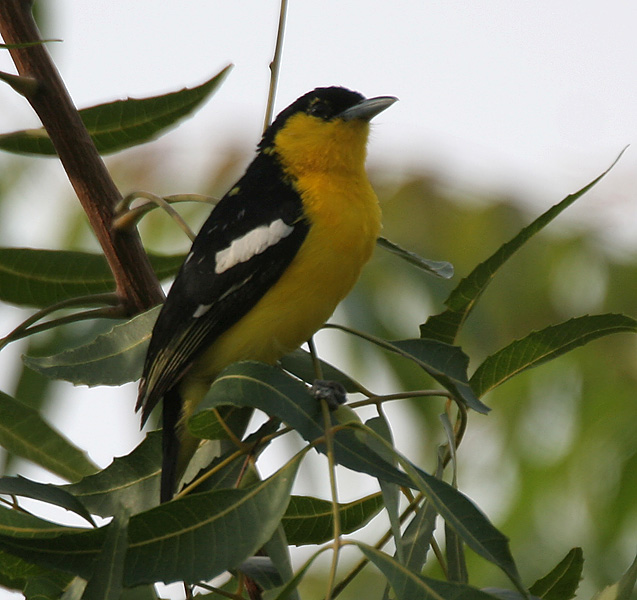
A. t. multicolor: male in Hyderabad, India

During the breeding season, mainly after the monsoons, the male performs an acrobatic courtship display, darting up into the air fluffing up all his feathers, especially those on the pale green rump, then spiralling down to the original perch. Once he lands, he spreads his tail and droops his wings. Two to four greenish white eggs are laid in a small and compact cup-shaped nest made out of grass and bound with cobwebs and placed in the fork of a tree. Both male and female incubate and eggs hatch after about 14 days. Nests predators include snakes, lizards, crow-pheasant and crows. Nests may also be brood-parasitized by the banded bay cuckoo.

Ioras moult twice in a year and the plumage variation makes them somewhat complicated for plumage based separation of the populations.

A species of Haemoproteus, H. aethiginae, was described from a specimen of the common iora from Goa.

== Gallery ==
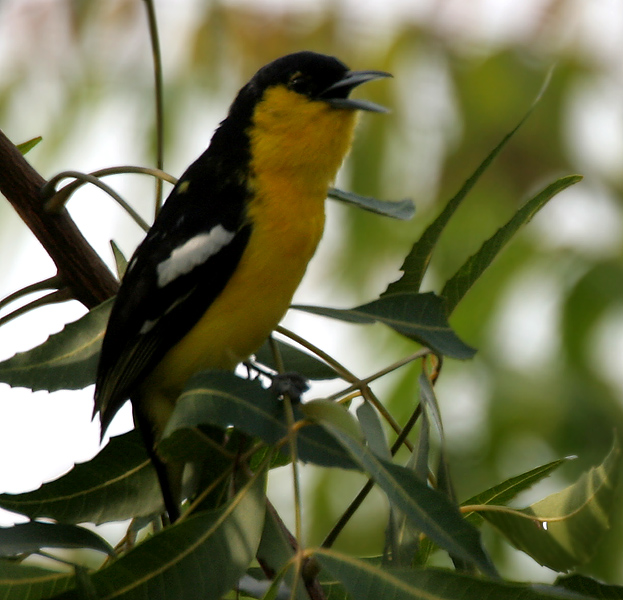
A. t. multicolor: male calling in Hyderabad, India.

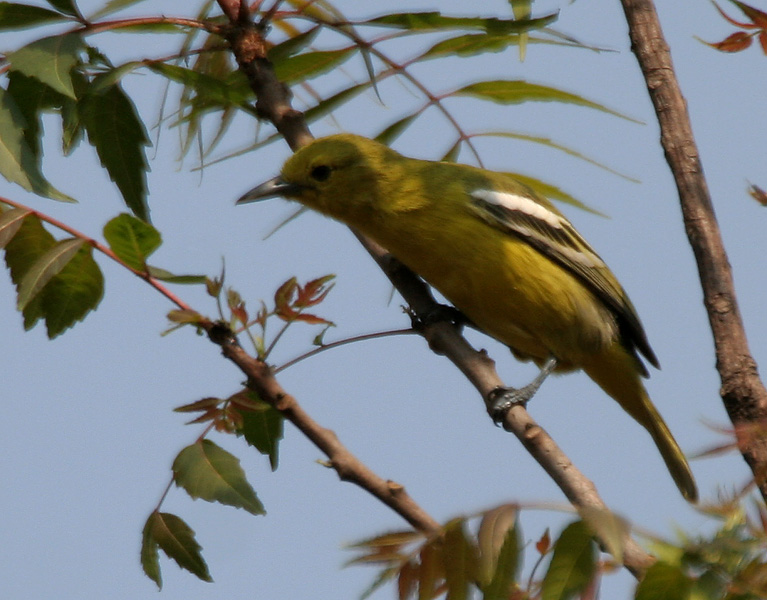
A. t. multicolor: female in Hyderabad

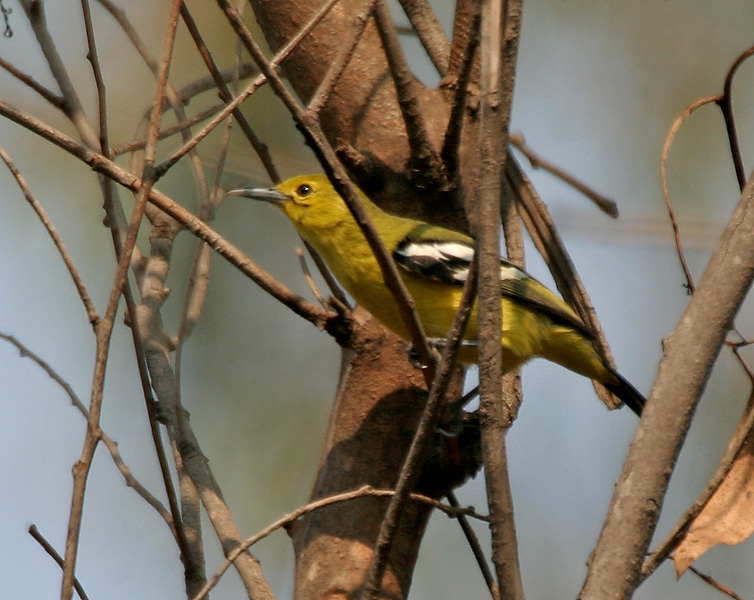
A. t. multicolor: female in Hyderabad

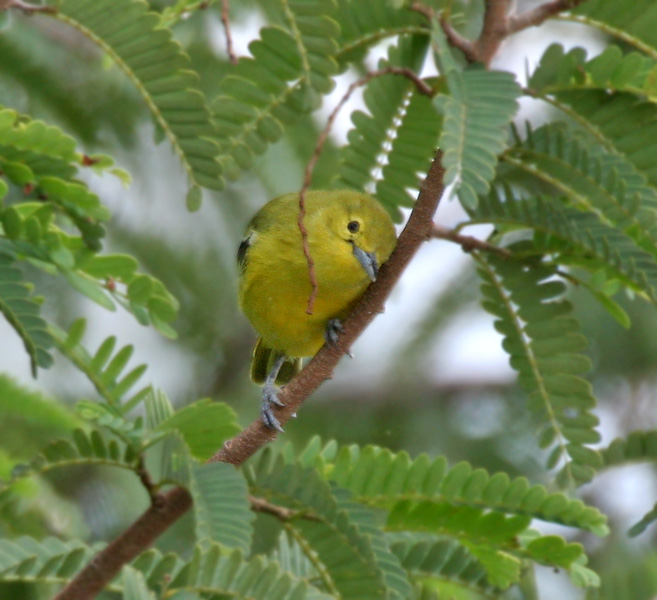
A. t. multicolor: female in Narsapur, Medak district, India

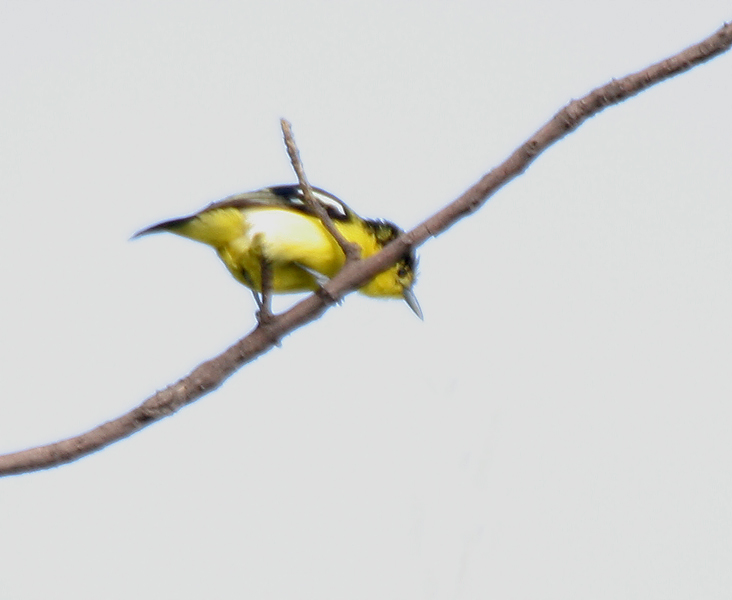
A. t. multicolor: male in Hyderabad

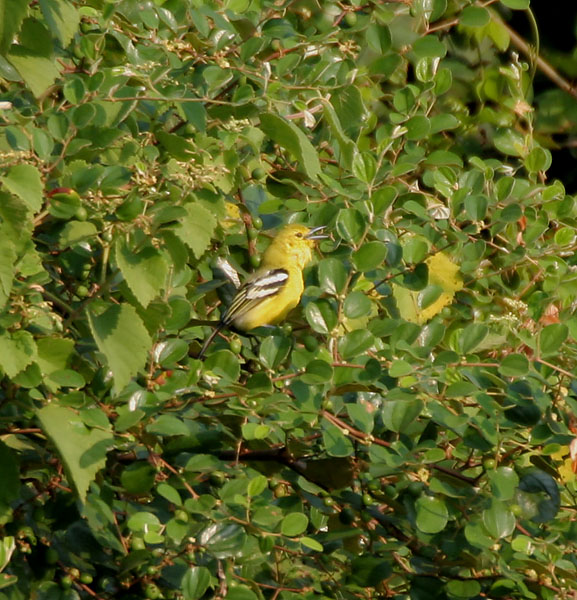
A. t. multicolor: female in Narsapur

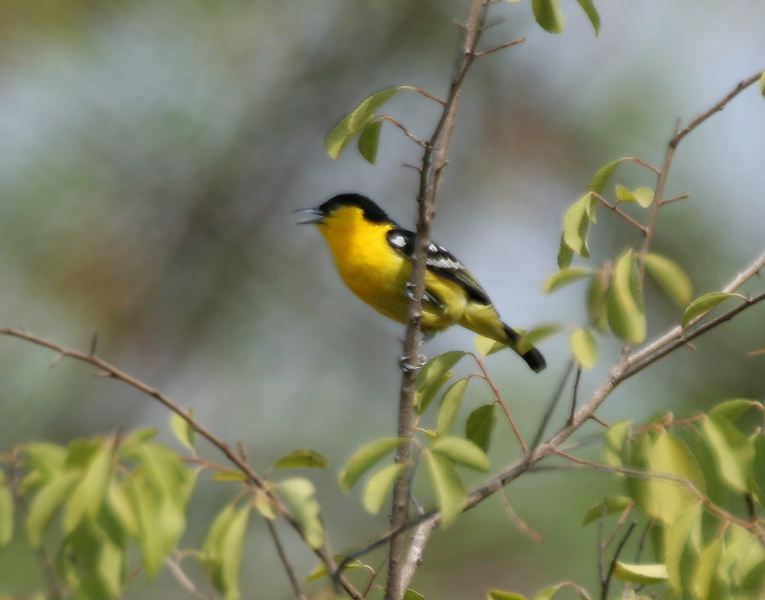
A. t. multicolor: male calling in Shamirpet, Rangareddy district, Andhra Pradesh, India

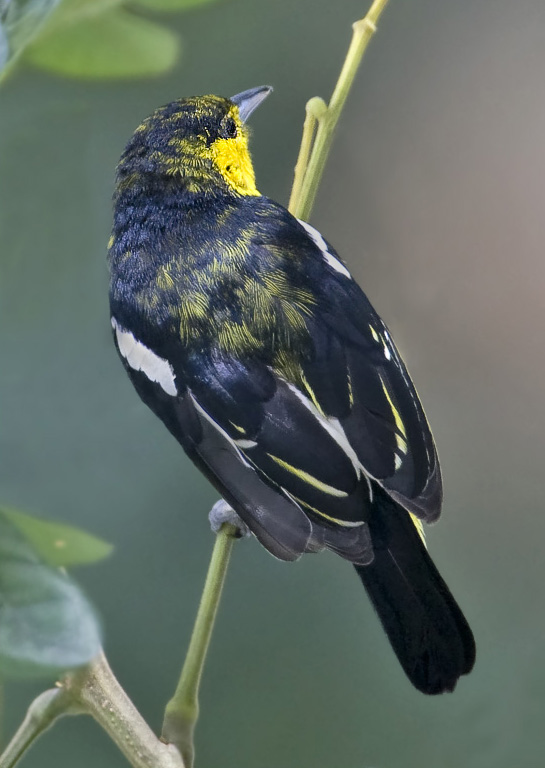
Adult breeding male, Singapore

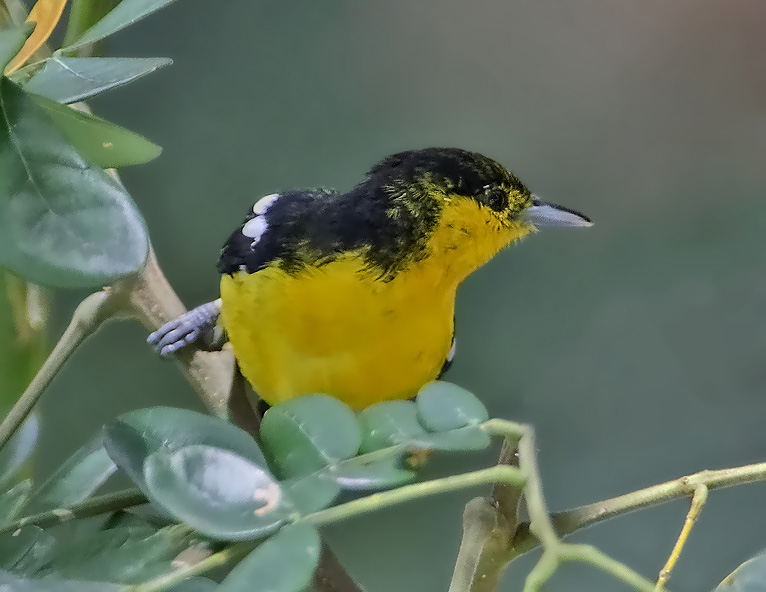
Adult breeding male, Singapore

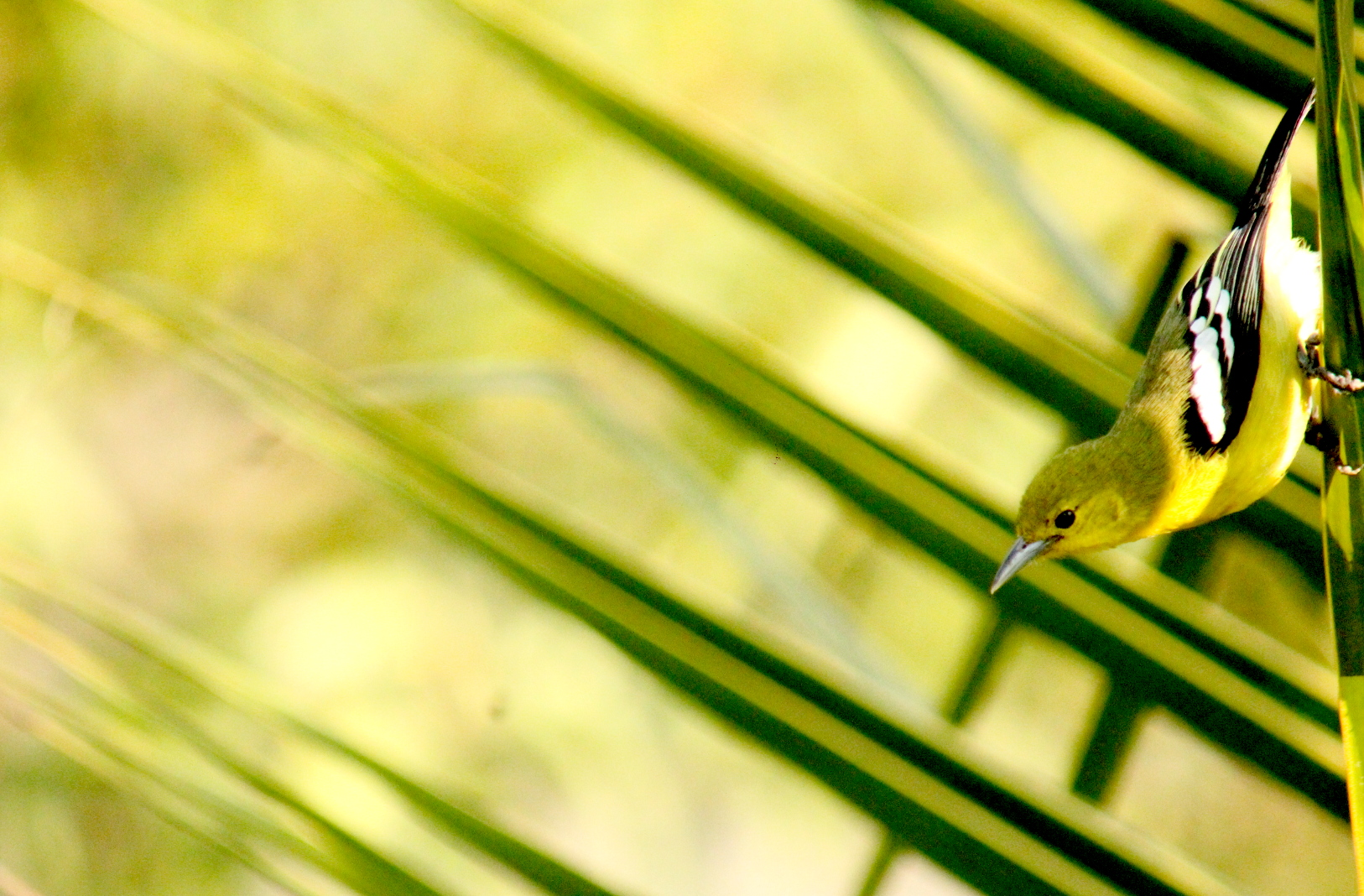
Common Iora: female at Sajnakhali Wildlife Sanctuary
Museum specimens for subspecies at Naturalis

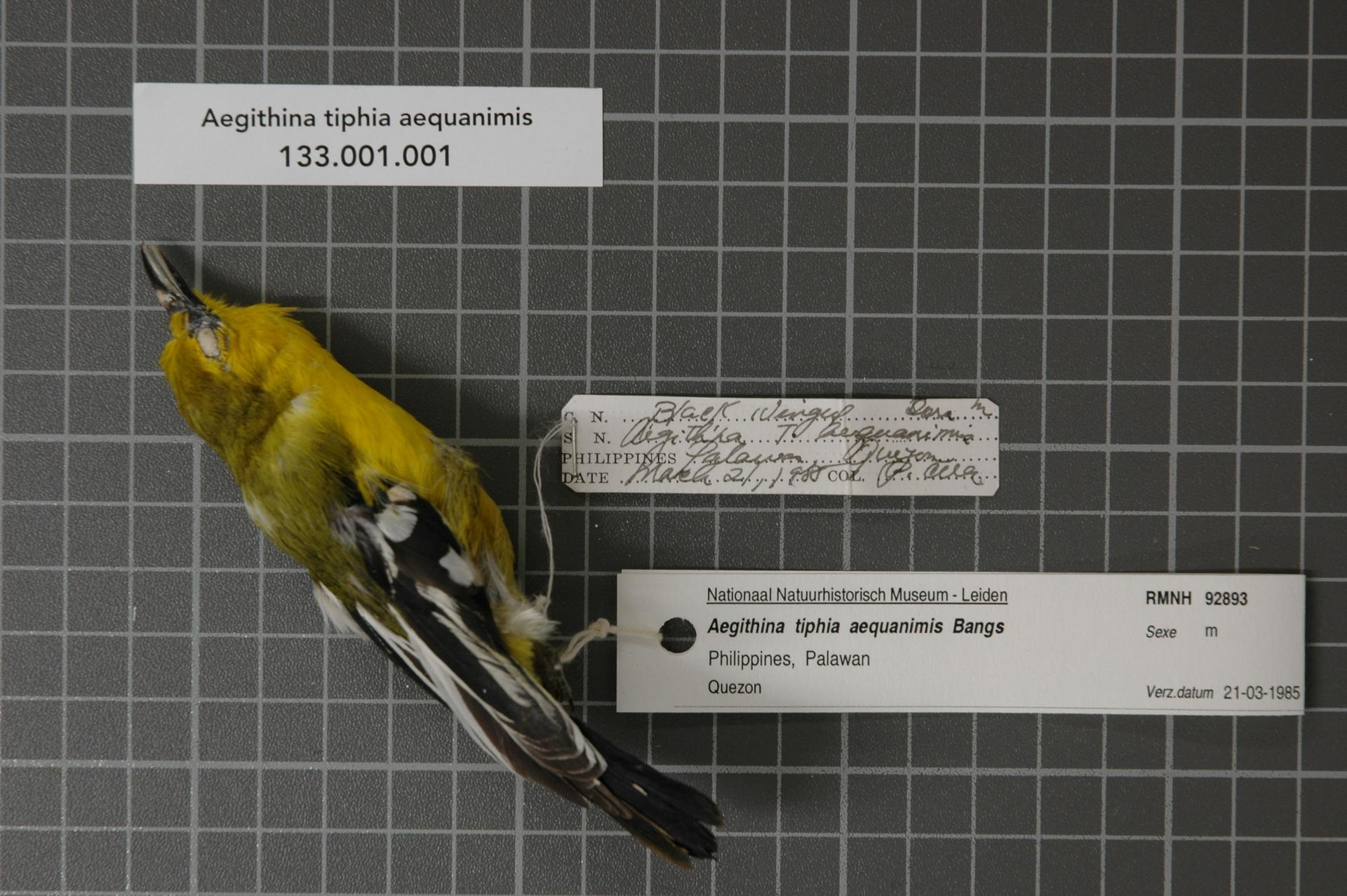
Aegithina tiphia aequanimis Bangs, 1922, male

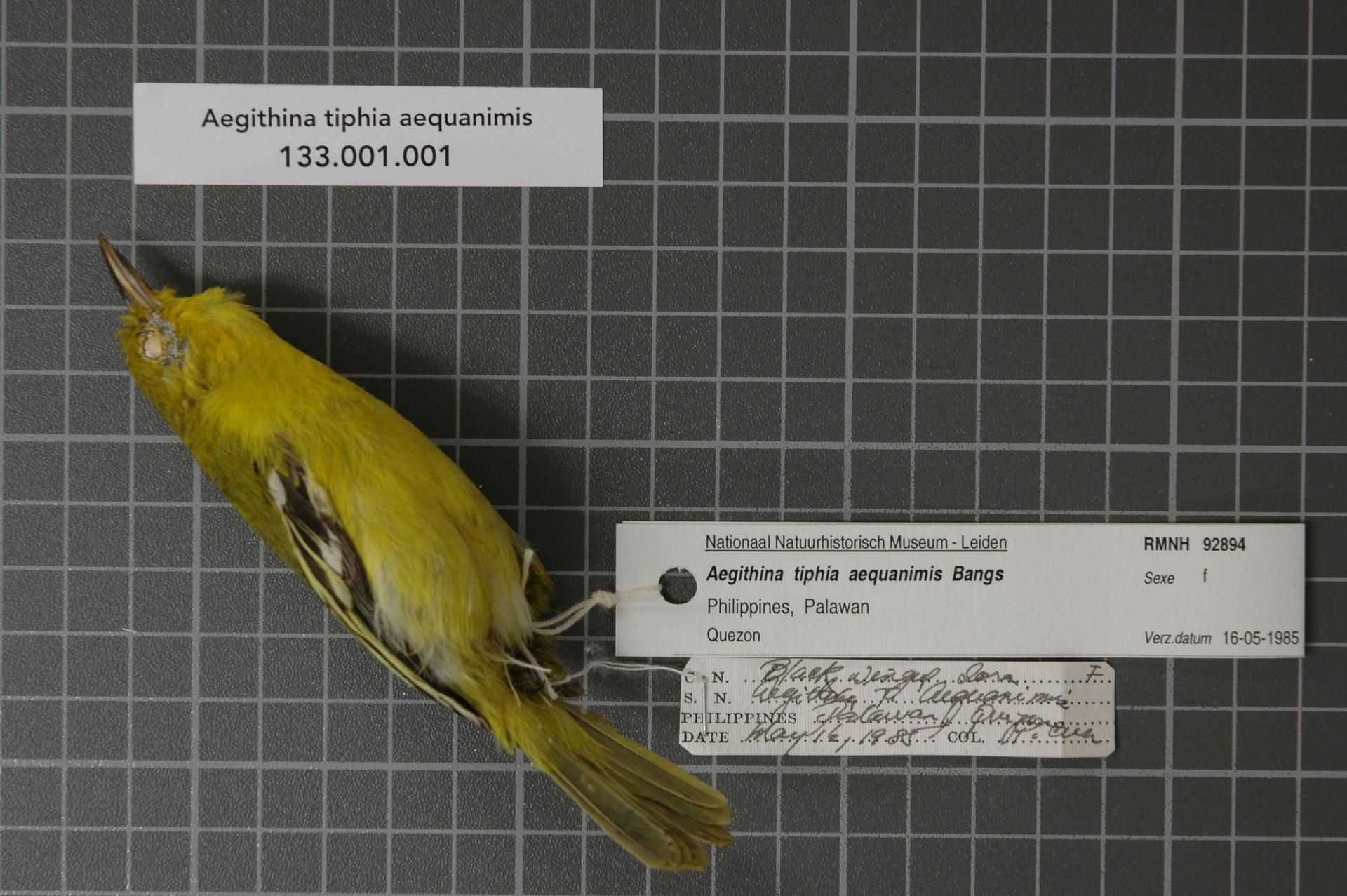
Aegithina tiphia aequanimis Bangs, 1922, female

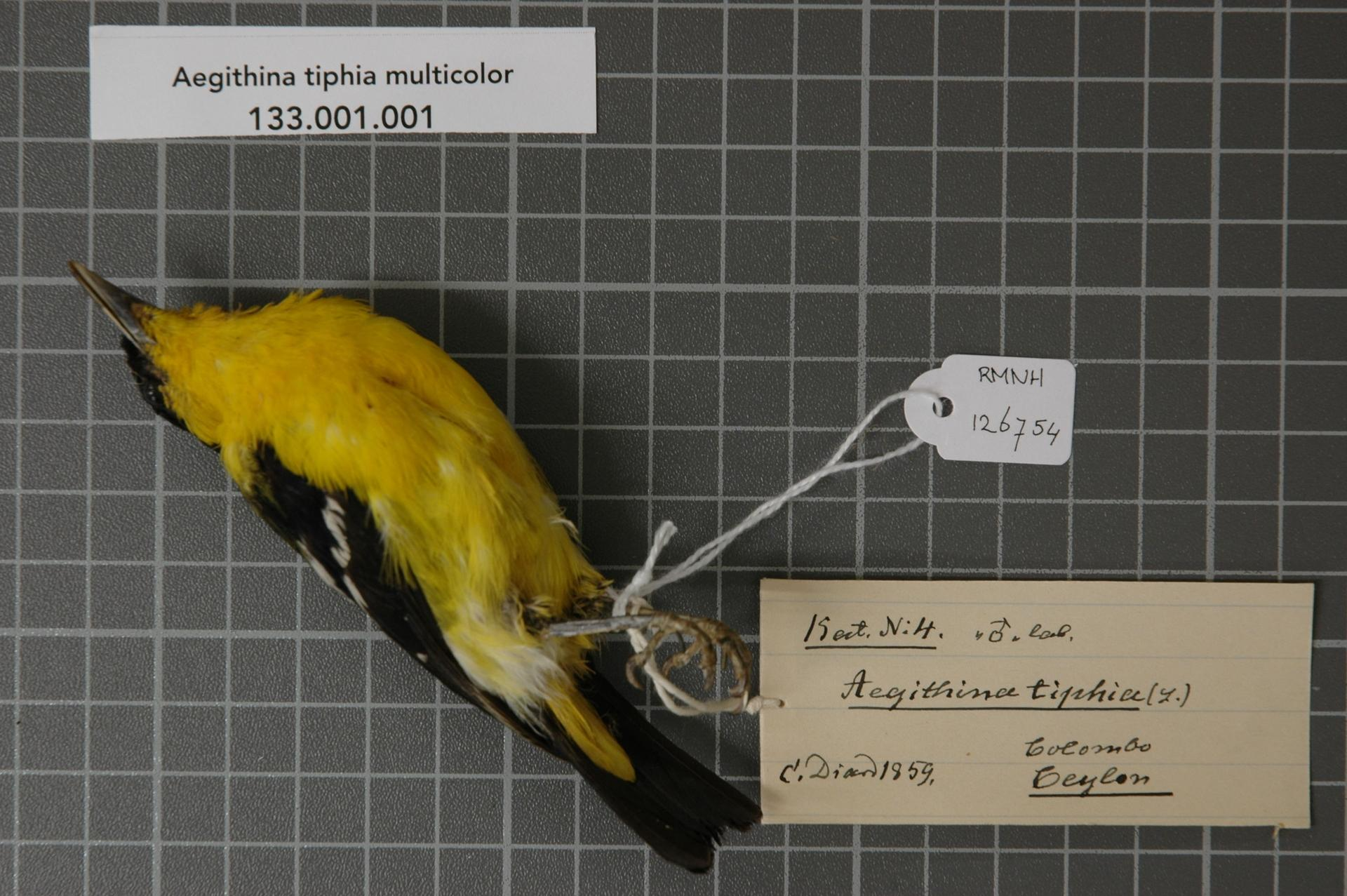
Aegithina tiphia multicolor (Gmelin, 1789), male

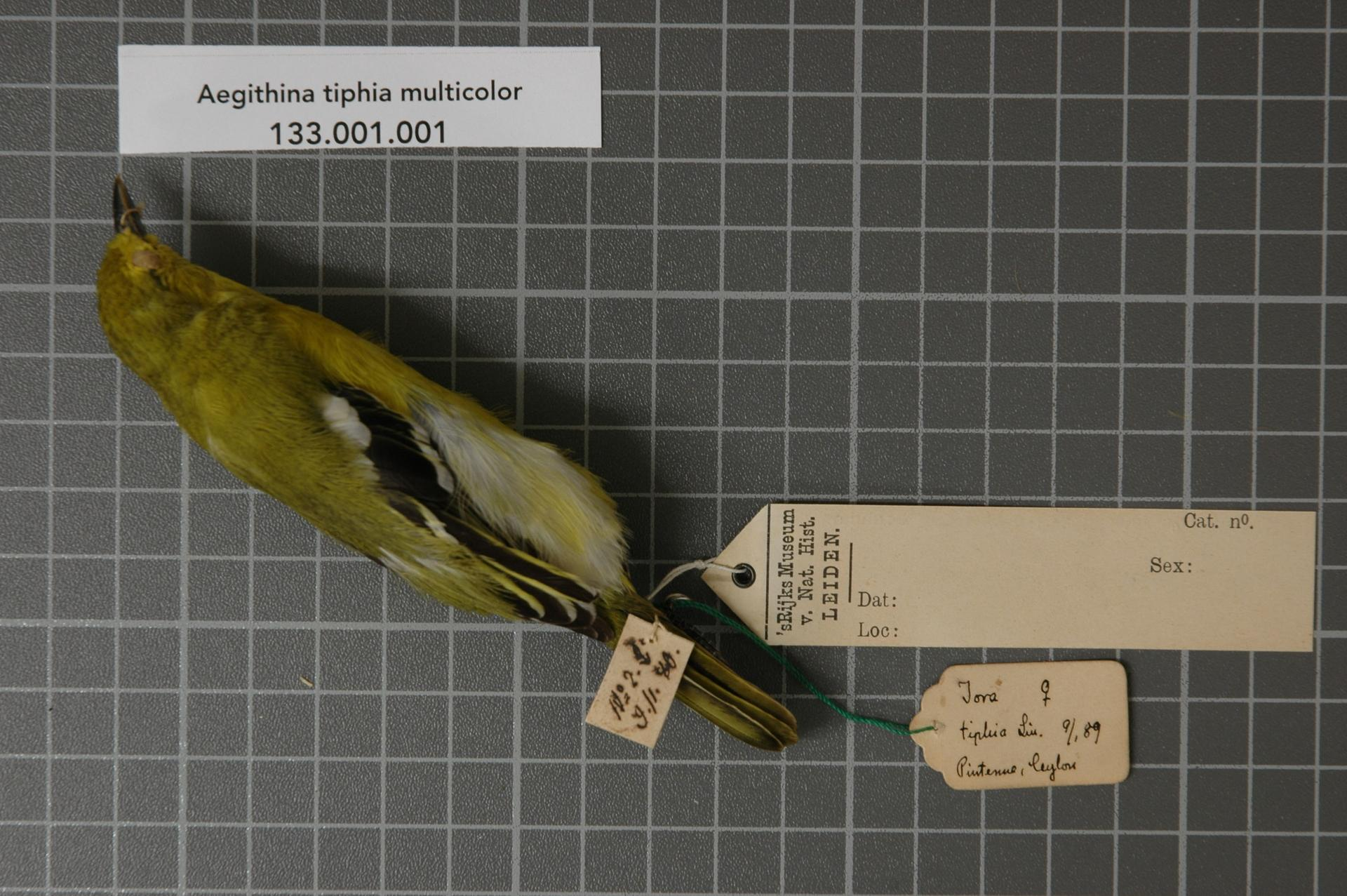
Aegithina tiphia multicolor (Gmelin, 1789), female
