= Cerulean (disambiguation) =

Cerulean is a shade of blue.

Cerulean may also refer to:

== Music ==
- Cerulean (Baths album), 2010
- Cerulean (The Ocean Blue album), 1991
- "Cerulean", a song by Blank Banshee from the 2016 album Mega
- Cerulean, a 2026 studio album by Danny L Harle

== Places ==
- Cerulean, Kentucky, United States
- Cerulean Lake, in Glacier National Park, Montana, U.S.
- Cerulean Tower, in Tokyo, Japan

== Other uses ==
- Ceruleans, or Jamides, a genus of butterflies
- Cerulean, a cyan fluorescent protein

== See also ==
- Cerulean cuckooshrike
- Cerulean kingfisher
- Cerulean flycatcher
- Cerulean warbler
- Cerulean-capped manakin
