= Mount Carter (Montana) =

Mountain in United States of America

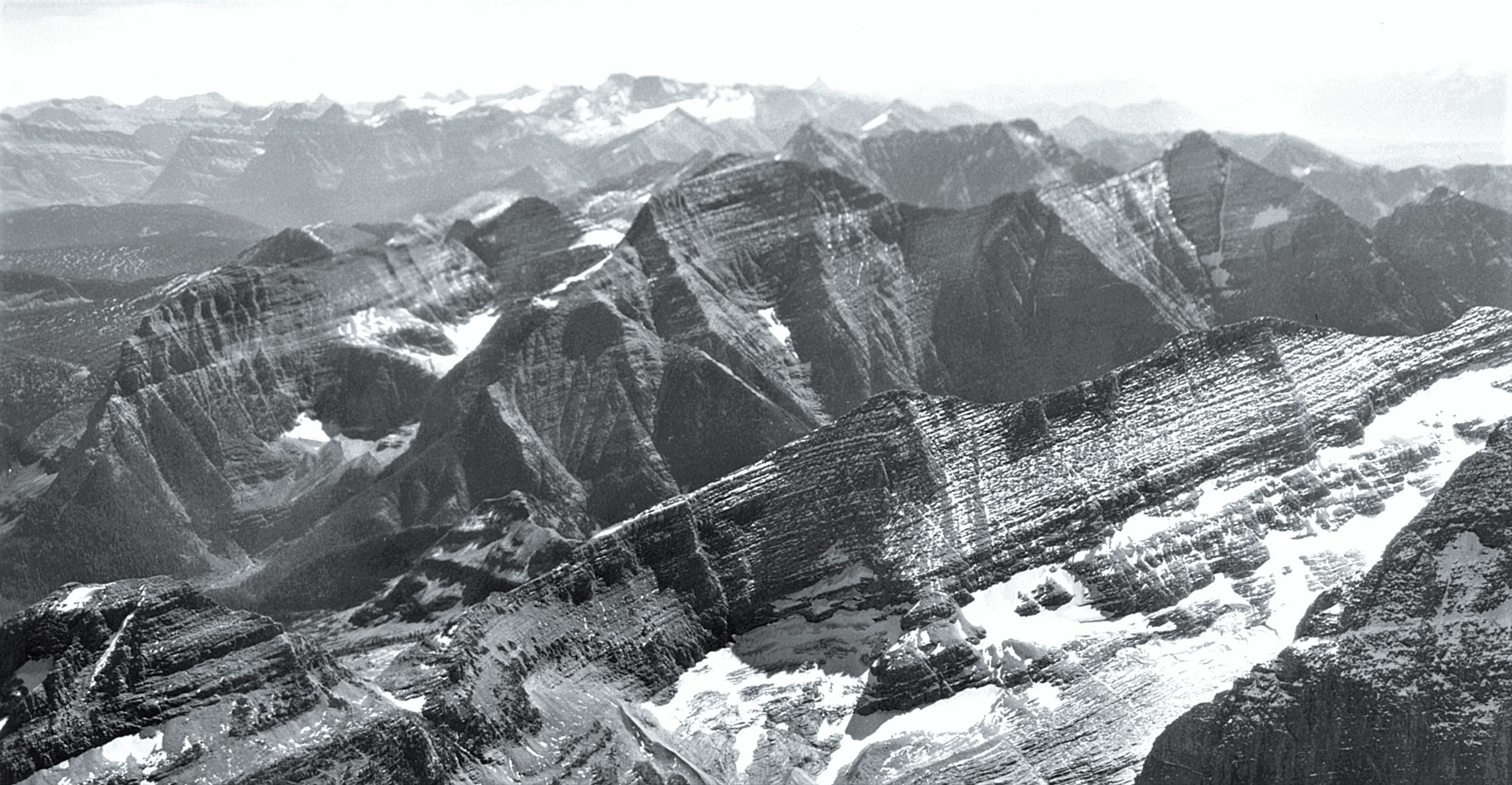
- Northwest aspect, centered (1969)

Highest point
- Elevation: 9,848 ft (3,002 m)
- Prominence: 803 ft (245 m)
- Parent peak: Rainbow Peak
- Coordinates: 48°53′32″N 114°04′39″W

Naming
- Etymology: Thomas H. Carter

Geography
- Location within Montana Location within the United States
- Location: Flathead County, Montana, U.S.
- Parent range: Livingston Range
- Topo map(s): USGS Mount Carter, MT

Mount Carter (9,848 feet (3,002 m)) is located in the Livingston Range, Glacier National Park in the U.S. state of Montana. Rainbow Glacier is just south of Mount Carter while Weasel Collar Glacier is immediately northeast. Mount Carter is the tenth tallest peak in Glacier National Park.

== Climate ==
Climate data for Mount Carter (MT) 48.8932 N, 114.0776 W, Elevation: 8,963 ft (2,732 m) (1991–2020 normals)
Month	Jan	Feb	Mar	Apr	May	Jun	Jul	Aug	Sep	Oct	Nov	Dec	Year
Mean daily maximum °F (°C)	21.8 (−5.7)	21.7 (−5.7)	25.5 (−3.6)	30.7 (−0.7)	40.0 (4.4)	47.5 (8.6)	58.2 (14.6)	58.9 (14.9)	51.0 (10.6)	37.8 (3.2)	25.5 (−3.6)	20.5 (−6.4)	36.6 (2.6)
Daily mean °F (°C)	15.9 (−8.9)	14.5 (−9.7)	17.2 (−8.2)	21.9 (−5.6)	30.5 (−0.8)	37.4 (3.0)	46.8 (8.2)	47.0 (8.3)	39.7 (4.3)	28.9 (−1.7)	19.8 (−6.8)	15.0 (−9.4)	27.9 (−2.3)
Mean daily minimum °F (°C)	10.0 (−12.2)	7.3 (−13.7)	8.8 (−12.9)	13.1 (−10.5)	21.0 (−6.1)	27.4 (−2.6)	35.4 (1.9)	35.2 (1.8)	28.3 (−2.1)	20.1 (−6.6)	14.1 (−9.9)	9.4 (−12.6)	19.2 (−7.1)
Average precipitation inches (mm)	12.16 (309)	8.93 (227)	9.77 (248)	6.86 (174)	6.10 (155)	7.59 (193)	2.58 (66)	2.31 (59)	4.24 (108)	6.99 (178)	11.48 (292)	11.98 (304)	90.99 (2,313)
Source: PRISM Climate Group

== See also ==
- List of mountains and mountain ranges of Glacier National Park (U.S.)
