= Small blue kingfisher =

Small blue kingfisher is a common name for several birds and may refer to:

- Alcedo atthis, widely distributed in Eurasia and North Africa
- Alcedo coerulescens, native to Indonesia
