= Cerulean Lake =

Lake in Montana, United States

- Location within Montana Location within the United States
- Location: Glacier National Park, Flathead County, Montana, US
- Coordinates: 48°52′20″N 114°03′27″W
- Lake type: Natural
- Primary inflows: Rainbow Creek
- Primary outflows: Rainbow Creek
- Basin countries: United States
- Max. length: .40 mi (0.64 km)
- Max. width: .35 mi (0.56 km)
- Surface elevation: 4,665 ft (1,422 m)

Cerulean Lake is located in Glacier National Park, in the U. S. state of Montana. Cerulean Lake is in a cirque surrounded by high peaks including Rainbow Peak to the west, which rises more than 5,000 feet (1,500 m) above the lake. Melt from Rainbow Glacier to the west enters Cerulean lake via Rainbow Creek and other sources.

== See also ==
- List of lakes in Flathead County, Montana (M-Z)
