= Weasel Collar Glacier =

Glacier in Montana, United States

- Location within Montana
- Type: Mountain glacier
- Location: Glacier National Park, Flathead County, Montana, United States
- Coordinates: 48°53′40″N 114°03′52″W
- Area: Approximately 136 acres (0.55 km^{2}) in 2005
- Terminus: Barren rock
- Status: Retreating

Weasel Collar Glacier is in Glacier National Park, U.S. state of Montana. The glacier is situated immediately east of Mount Carter at an average elevation of 7,500 feet (2,300 m) above sea level. The glacier is in a cirque and the terminus faces to the north. Between 1966 and 2005, Weasel Collar Glacier had the least glacial ice lost of any glacier in Glacier National Park, losing only 6.7 percent of its surface area.

== See also ==
- List of glaciers in the United States
- Glaciers in Glacier National Park (U.S.)
