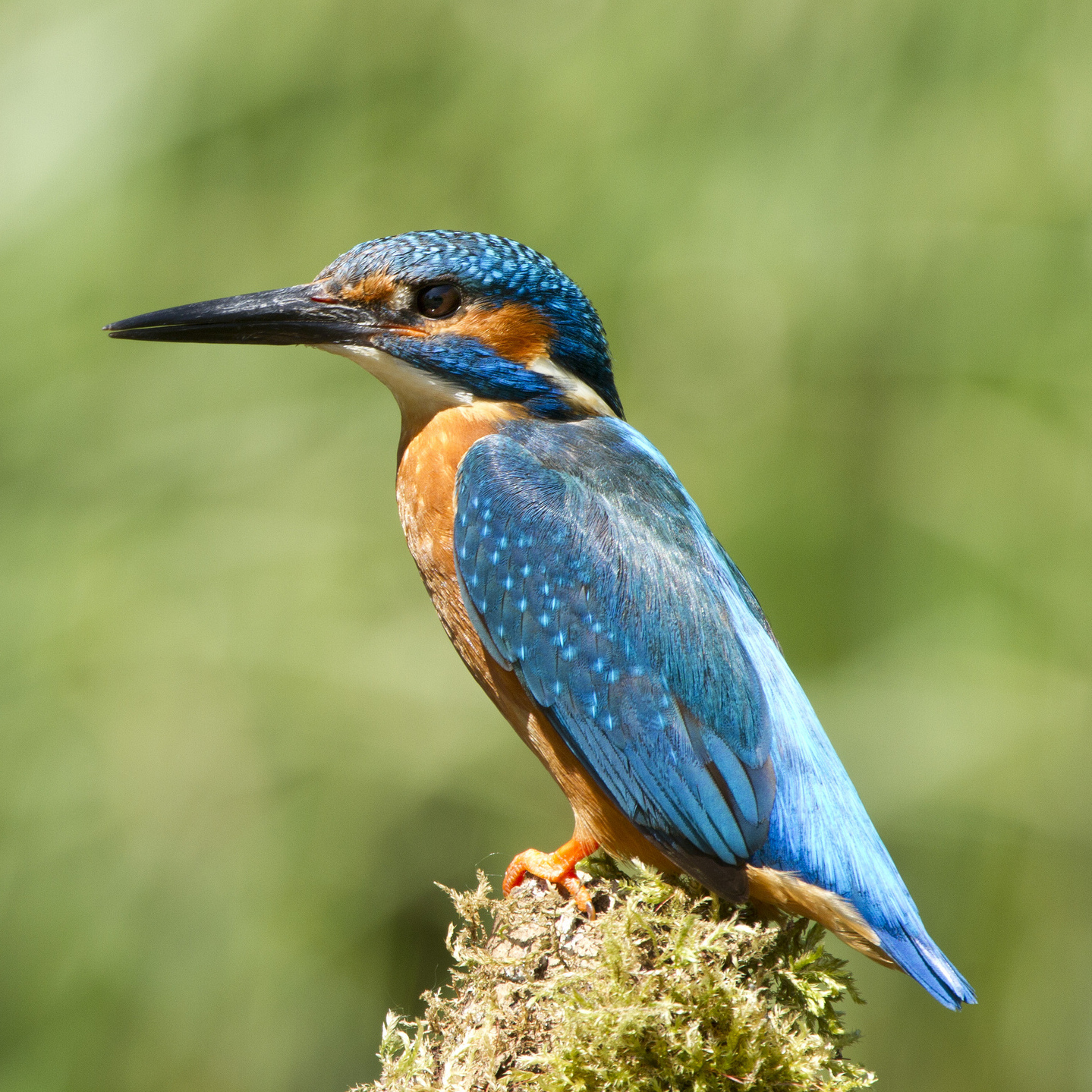
- Male; England
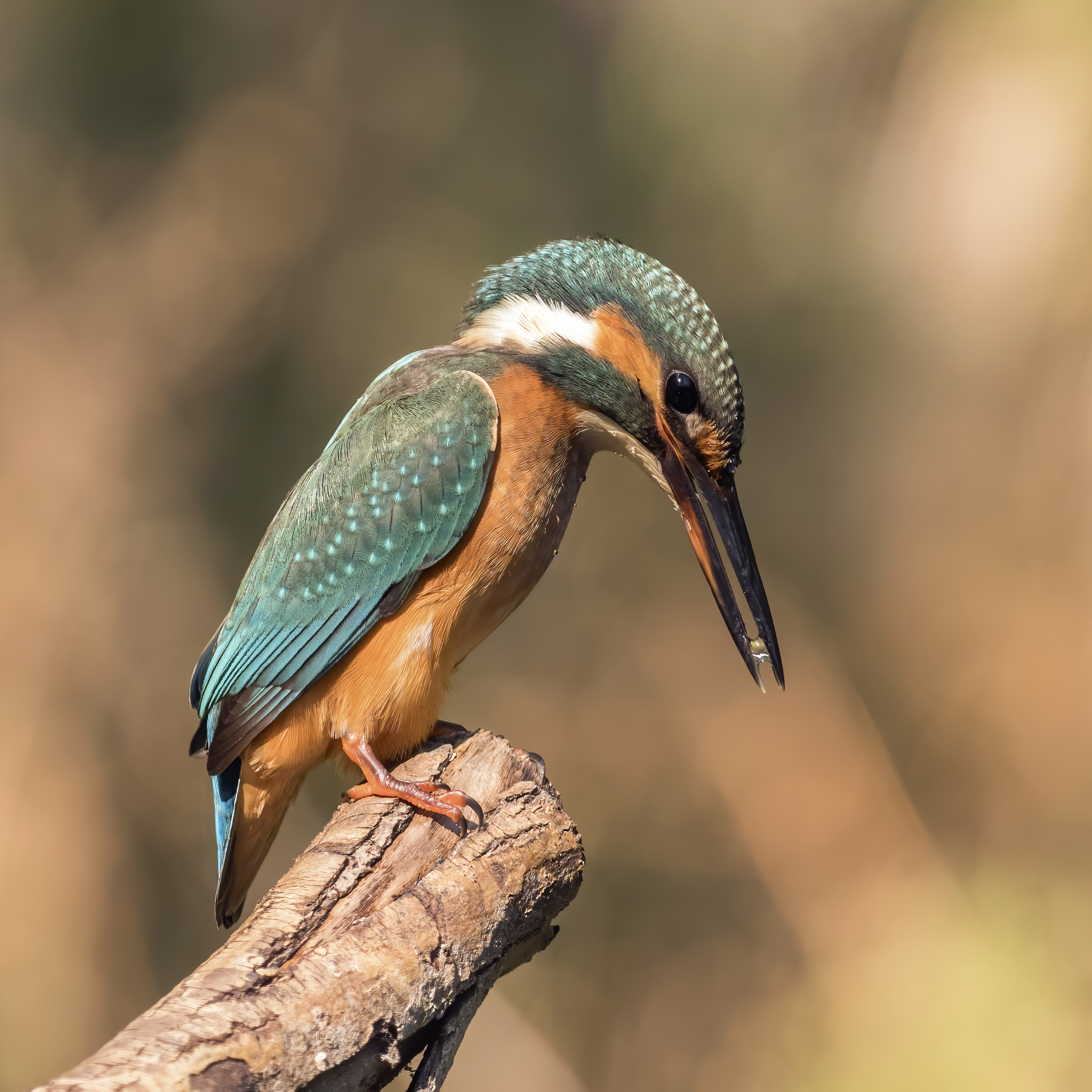
- Female; Kecskemét, Hungary; Both A. a. ispida

Conservation status
- Least Concern (IUCN 3.1)

Scientific classification
- Kingdom: Animalia
- Phylum: Chordata
- Class: Aves
- Order: Coraciiformes
- Family: Alcedinidae
- Subfamily: Alcedininae
- Genus: Alcedo
- Species: A. atthis

Binomial name
- Alcedo atthis (Linnaeus, 1758)
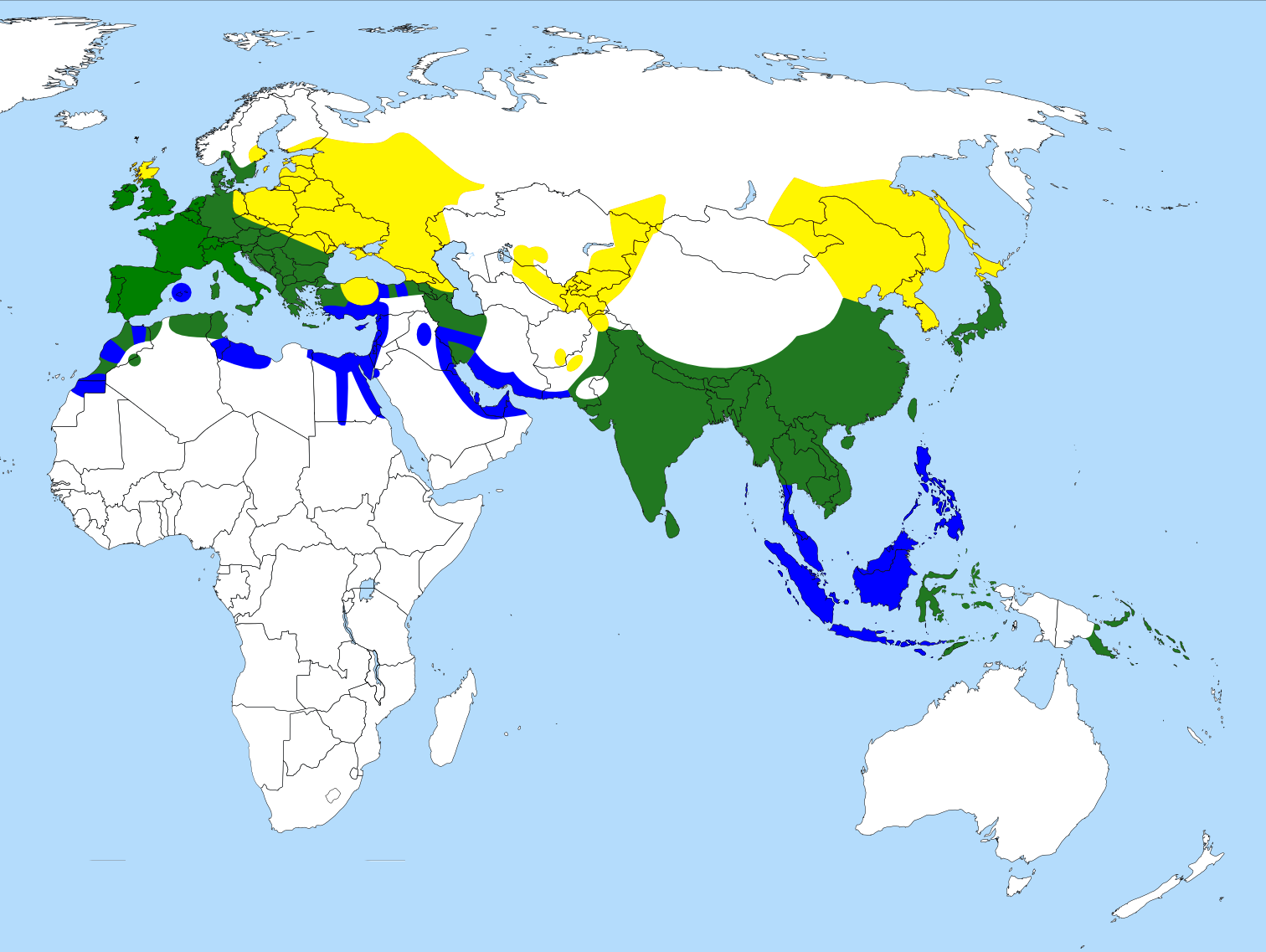
- Breeding range Resident all year round Non-breeding range

Synonyms
- Gracula atthis Linnaeus, 1758

= Common kingfisher =

Species of bird

The common kingfisher (Alcedo atthis), also known as the Eurasian kingfisher and river kingfisher, is a small kingfisher with seven subspecies recognized within its wide distribution across Eurasia and North Africa. It is resident in much of its range, but migrates from areas where rivers freeze in winter.

This sparrow-sized bird has the typical short-tailed, large-headed kingfisher profile; it has blue upperparts, orange underparts and a long bill. It feeds mainly on fish, caught by diving, and has special visual adaptations to enable it to see prey under water. The glossy white eggs are laid in a nest at the end of a burrow in a riverbank.

== Taxonomy ==
The common kingfisher was first described by Carl Linnaeus in the 10th edition of his Systema Naturae in 1758 as Gracula atthis. The modern binomial name derives from the Latin alcedo, 'kingfisher' (from Greek ἀλκυών, halcyon), and Atthis, a beautiful young woman of Lesbos, and favourite of Sappho.

The genus Alcedo comprises seven small kingfishers that all eat fish as part of their diet. The common kingfisher's closest relative is the cerulean kingfisher that has white underparts and is found in parts of Indonesia.

== Description ==
This species has the typical short-tailed, dumpy-bodied, large-headed, and long-billed kingfisher shape. The adult male of the western European subspecies, A. a. ispida has green-blue upperparts with pale azure-blue back and rump, a rufous patch by the bill base, and a rufous ear-patch. It has a green-blue neck stripe, white neck blaze and throat, rufous underparts, and a black bill with some red at the base. The legs and feet are bright red. It is about 16 cm (6 1/2 in) long with a wingspan of 25 cm (10 in), and weighs 34–46 g (1 3/16–1 5/8 oz). The female is identical in appearance to the male except that her lower mandible is orange-red with a black tip. The juvenile is similar to the adult, but with duller and greener upperparts and paler underparts. Its bill is black, and the legs are also initially black. Feathers are moulted gradually between July and November with the main flight feathers taking 90–100 days to moult and regrow. Some that moult late may suspend their moult during cold winter weather.

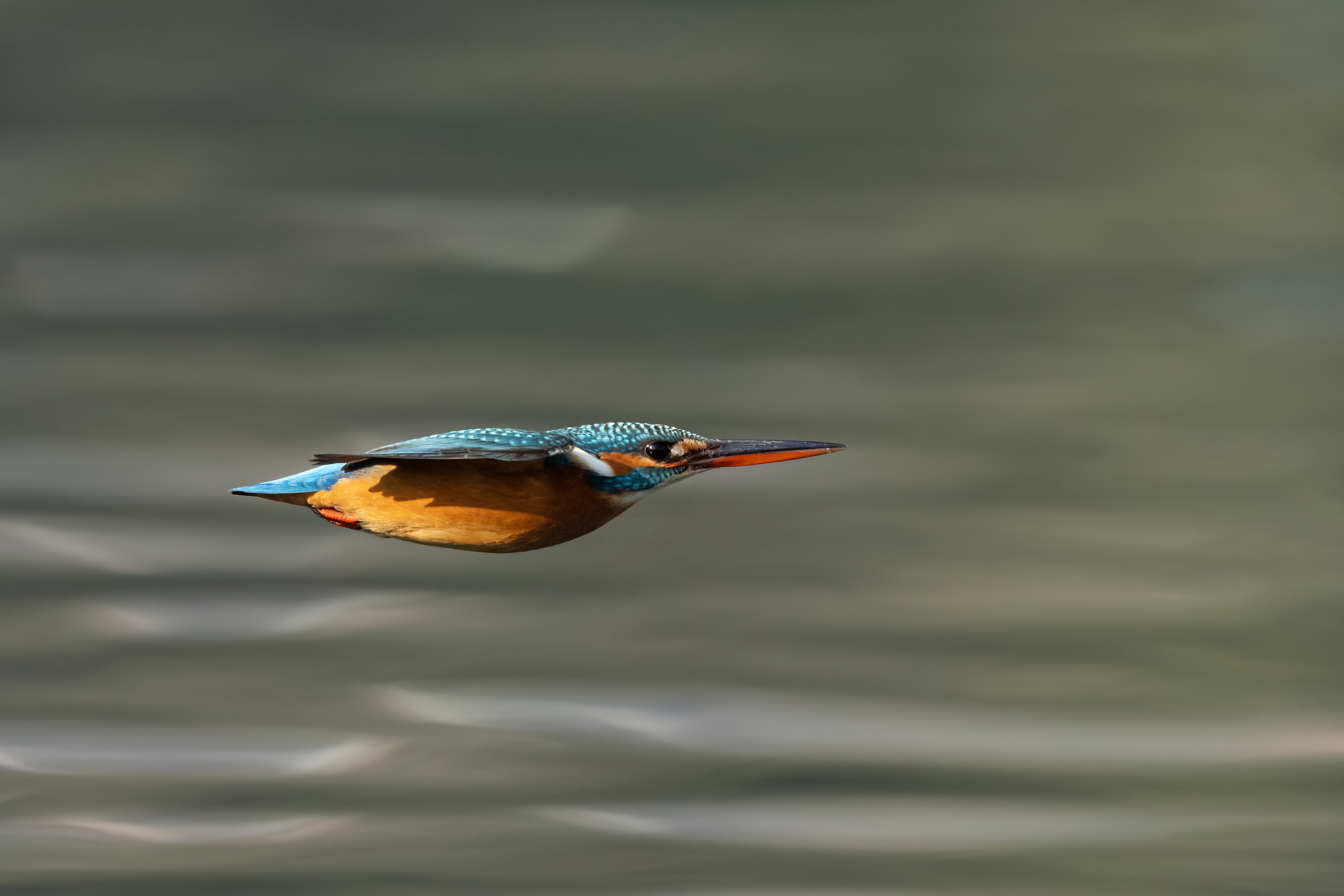
Common kingfisher in flight over Taudaha Lake, Kirtipur, Nepal

The flight of the kingfisher is fast, direct and usually low over water. The short, rounded wings whirr rapidly, and a bird flying away shows an electric-blue "flash" down its back.

In North Africa, Europe and Asia north of the Himalayas, this is the only small blue kingfisher. In south and southeast Asia, it can be confused with six other small blue-and-rufous kingfishers, but the rufous ear patches distinguish it from all but juvenile blue-eared kingfishers; details of the head pattern may be necessary to differentiate the two species where both occur.

The common kingfisher has no song. The flight call is a short, sharp whistle chee repeated two or three times. Anxious birds emit a harsh, shrit-it-it and nestlings call for food with a churring noise.

=== Geographical variation ===
There are seven subspecies differing in the hue of the upperparts and the intensity of the rufous colour of the underparts; size varies across the subspecies by up to 10%. The races resident south of the Wallace Line have the bluest upperparts and partly blue ear-patches.

- A. a. ispida Linnaeus, 1758. Breeds from Ireland, Spain and southern Norway to Romania and western Russia and winters south to Iraq and southern Portugal.
- A. a. atthis. Breeds from northwestern Africa and southern Italy east to Afghanistan, Kashmir region, northern Xinjiang, and Siberia; it is a winter visitor south to Israel, northeastern Sudan, Yemen, Oman and Pakistan. Compared to A. a. ispida, it has a greener crown, paler underparts and is slightly larger.
- A. a. bengalensis Gmelin, 1788. Breeds in southern and eastern Asia from India to Indonesia, China, Korea, Japan and eastern Mongolia; winters south to Indonesia and the Philippines. It is smaller and brighter than the European races.
- A. a. taprobana Kleinschmidt, 1894. Resident breeder in Sri Lanka and southern India. Its upperparts are bright blue, not green-blue; it is the same size as A. a. bengalensis.
- A. a. floresiana Sharpe, 1892. Resident breeder from Bali to Timor. Like A. a. taprobana, but the blues are darker and the ear-patch is rufous with a few blue feathers.
- A. a. hispidoides Lesson, 1837. Resident breeder from Sulawesi to New Guinea and the islands of the western Pacific Ocean. Plumage colours are deeper than in A. a. floresiana, the blue on the hind neck and rump is purple-tinged and the ear-patch is blue.
- A. a. solomonensis Rothschild and Hartert, 1905. Resident breeder in the Solomon Islands east to San Cristobal. The largest southeast Asian subspecies, it has a blue ear-patch and is more purple-tinged than A. a. hispidoides, with which it interbreeds.

== Habitat and distribution ==
The common kingfisher is widely distributed over Europe, Asia, and North Africa, mainly south of 60°N. It is a common breeding species over much of its vast Eurasian range, but in North Africa it is mainly a winter visitor, although it is a scarce breeding resident in coastal Morocco and Tunisia. In temperate regions, this kingfisher inhabits clear, slow-flowing streams and rivers, and lakes with well-vegetated banks. It frequents scrubs and bushes with overhanging branches close to shallow open water in which it hunts. In winter it is more coastal, often feeding in estuaries or harbours and along rocky seashores. Tropical populations are found by slow-flowing rivers, in mangrove creeks and in swamps like in Bangladesh.

Common kingfishers are important members of ecosystems and good indicators of freshwater community health. The highest densities of breeding birds are found in habitats with clear water, which permits optimal prey visibility, and trees or shrubs on the banks. These habitats have also the highest quality of water, so the presence of this bird confirms the standard of the water. Measures to improve water flow can disrupt this habitat, and in particular, the replacement of natural banks by artificial confinement greatly reduces the populations of fish, amphibians and aquatic reptiles, and waterside birds are lost. It can tolerate a certain degree of urbanisation, provided the water remains clean.

This species is resident in areas where the climate is mild year-round, but must migrate after breeding from regions with prolonged freezing conditions in winter. Most birds winter within the southern parts of the breeding range, but smaller numbers cross the Mediterranean into Africa or travel over the mountains of Malaysia into Southeast Asia. Kingfishers migrate mainly at night, and some Siberian breeders must travel at least 3,000 km (1,900 mi) between the breeding sites and the wintering areas.

== Behaviour ==
=== Breeding ===
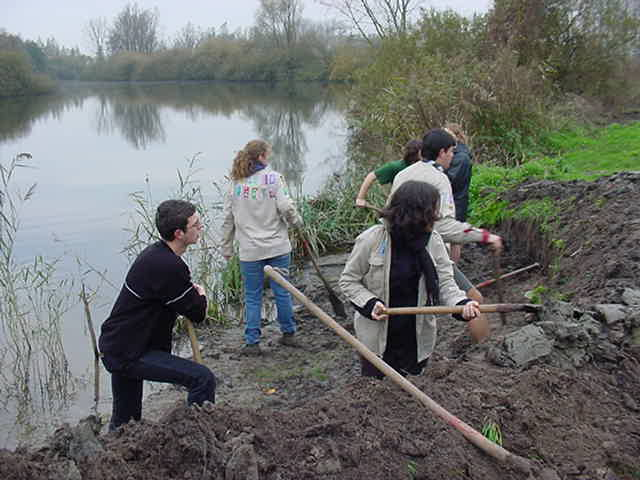
Volunteers in the Flemish Region of Belgium create a vertical bank in which common kingfishers have subsequently nested annually

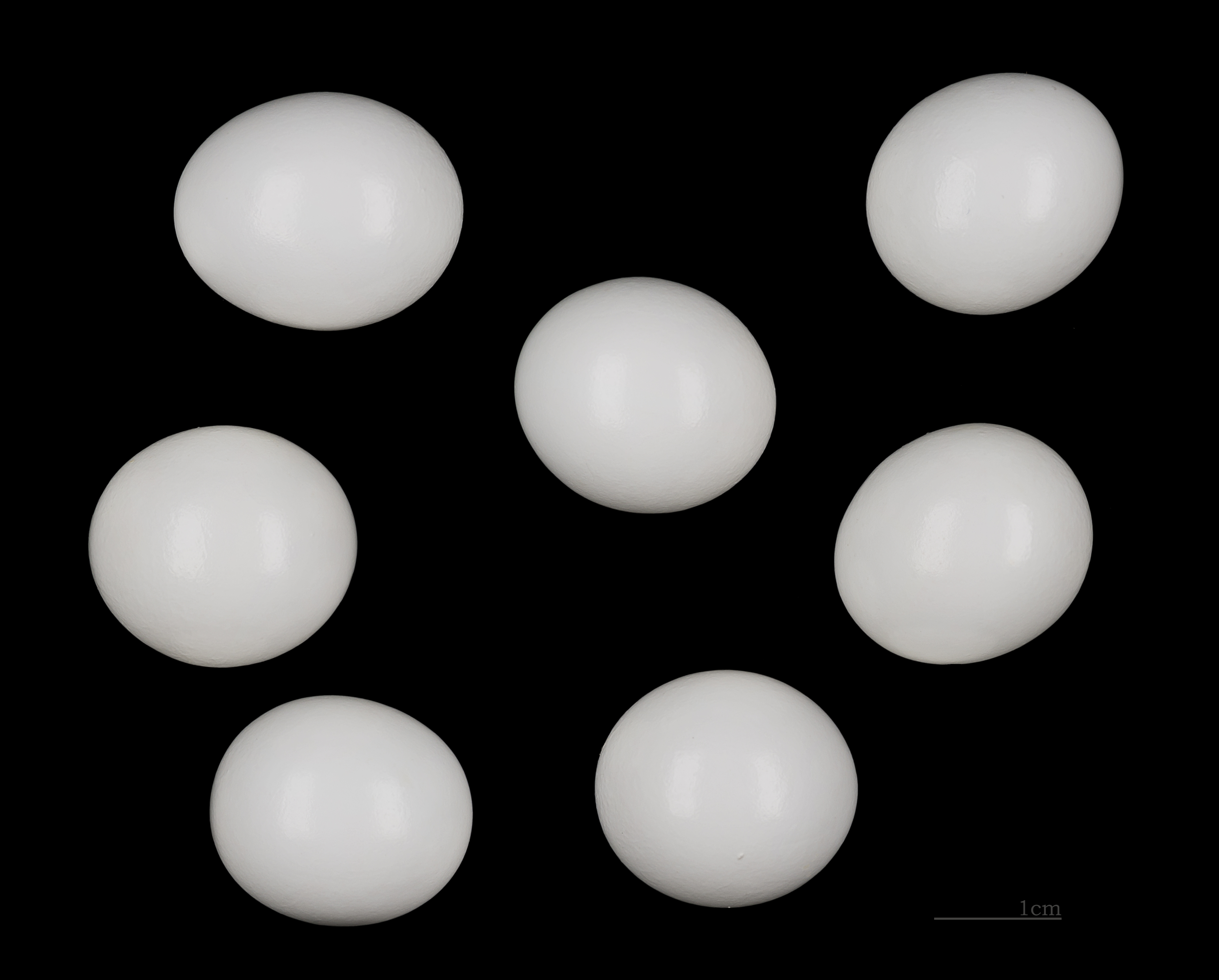
Eggs of Alcedo atthis, MHNT

Like all kingfishers, the common kingfisher is highly territorial; since it must eat around 60% of its body weight each day, it is essential to have control of a suitable stretch of river. It is solitary for most of the year, roosting alone in heavy cover. If another kingfisher enters its territory, both birds display from perches, and fights may occur, in which a bird will grab the other's beak and try to hold it underwater. Pairs form in the autumn but each bird retains a separate territory, generally at least 1 km (1/2 mi) long, but up to 3.5 km (2 1/4 mi) and territories are not merged until the spring.

The courtship is initiated by the male chasing the female while calling continually, and later by ritual feeding, with copulation usually following.

The nest is in a burrow excavated by both birds of the pair in a low vertical riverbank, or sometimes a quarry or other cutting. The straight, gently inclining burrow is normally 60–90 cm (25–35 in) long and ends in an enlarged chamber. The nest cavity is unlined but soon accumulates a litter of fish remains and cast pellets.

The common kingfisher typically lays two to ten glossy white eggs, which average 1.9 cm (3/4 in) in breadth, 2.2 cm (7/8 in) in length, and weigh about 4.3 g (5/32 oz), of which 5% is shell. Both sexes incubate by day, but only the female incubates at night. An incubating bird sits trance-like, facing the tunnel; it invariably casts a pellet, breaking it up with the bill. The eggs hatch in 19–20 days, one or two eggs in most clutches fail to do so because the parent cannot cover them prior. The altricial young are in the nest for a further 24–25 days, often more. Once large enough, young birds will come to the burrow entrance to be fed. Two broods, sometimes three, may be reared in a season.

=== Survival ===
The early days for fledged juveniles are more hazardous; during its first dives into the water, about four days after leaving the nest, a fledgling may become waterlogged and drown. Many young will not have learned to fish by the time they are driven out of their parents' territory, and only about half survive more than a week or two. Most kingfishers die of cold or lack of food, and a severe winter can kill a high percentage of the birds. Summer floods can destroy nests or make fishing difficult, resulting in starvation of the brood. Only a quarter of the young survive to breed the following year, but this is enough to maintain the population. Likewise, only a quarter of adult birds survive from one breeding season to the next. Very few birds live longer than one breeding season. The oldest bird on record was 21 years.

Other causes of death are cats, rats, collisions with vehicles and windows, and human disturbance of nesting birds, including riverbank works with heavy machinery. Since kingfishers are high up in the food chain, they are vulnerable to build-up of chemicals, and river pollution by industrial and agricultural products excludes the birds from many stretches of otherwise suitable rivers that would be habitats.

This species was killed in Victorian times for stuffing and display in glass cases and use in hat making. English naturalist William Yarrell also reported the country practice of killing a kingfisher and hanging it from a thread in the belief that it would swing to predict the direction in which the wind would blow. Persecution by anglers and to provide feathers for fishing flies were common in earlier decades, but are now largely a thing of the past.

=== Feeding ===
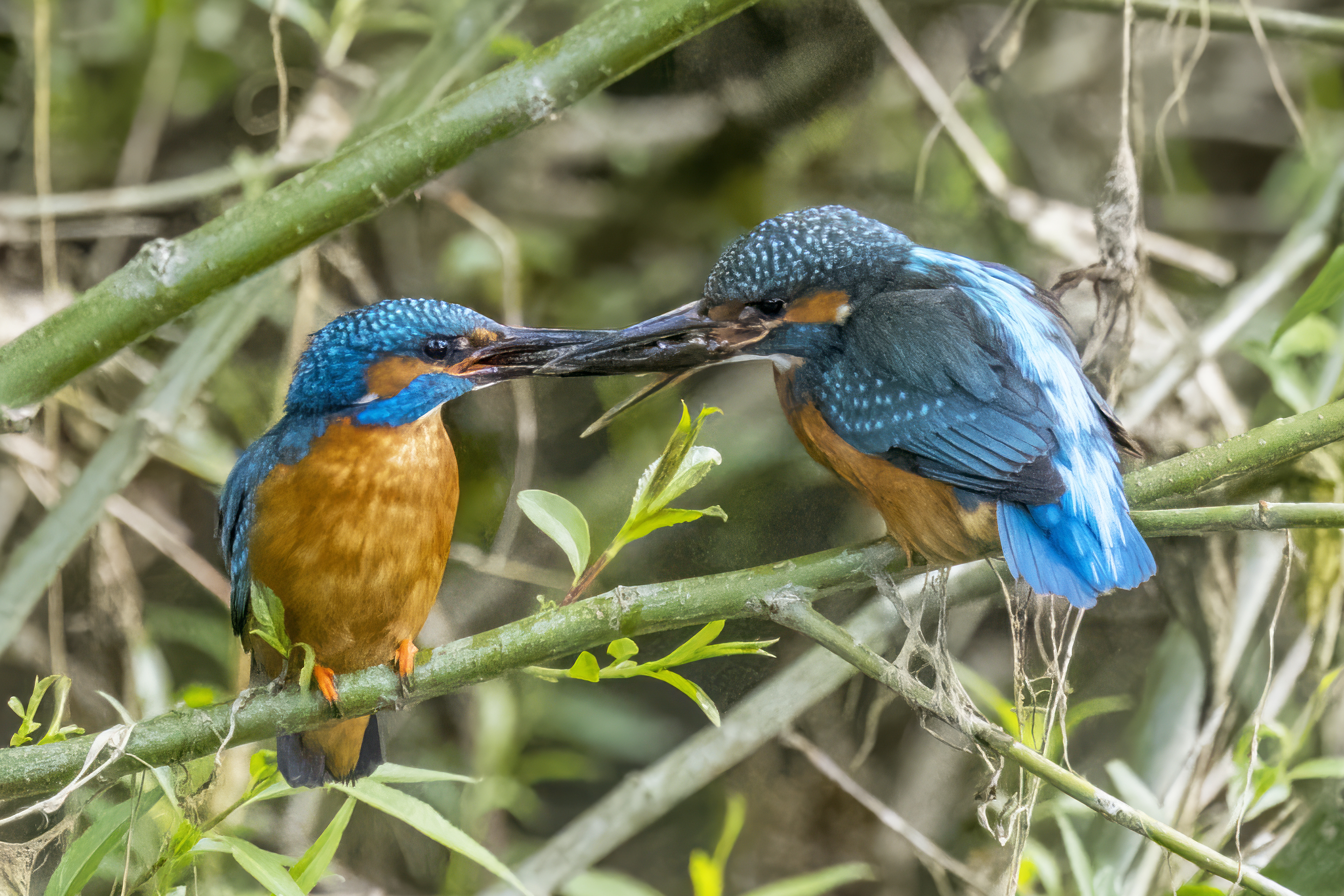
Male passing fish to female in spring courtship ritual

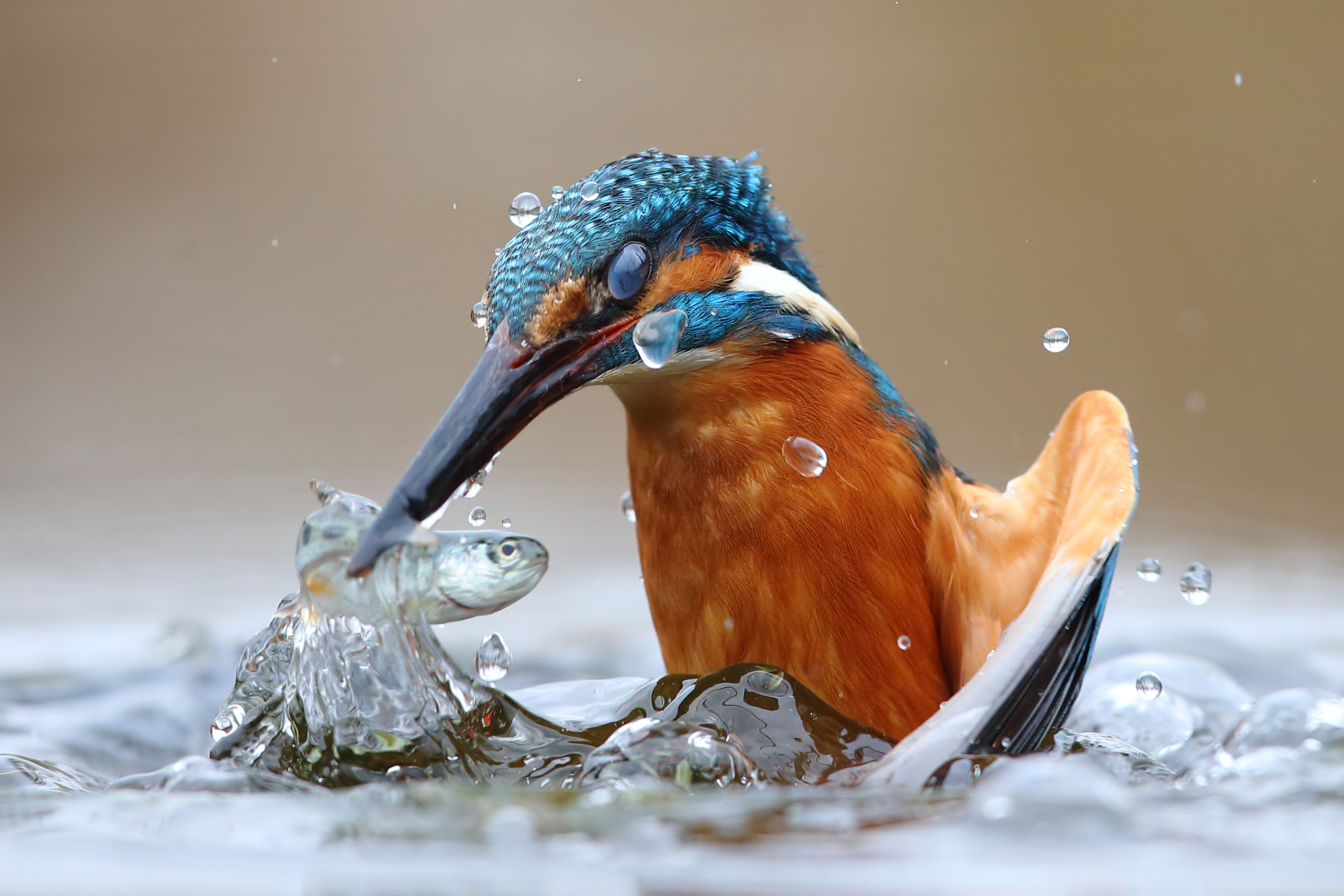
Male fishing in Italy's Po River

The common kingfisher hunts from a perch 1–2 m (3–7 ft) above the water, on a branch, post or riverbank, bill pointing down as it searches for prey. It bobs its head when food is detected to gauge the distance and plunges steeply down to seize its prey usually no deeper than 25 cm (10 in) below the surface. The wings are opened underwater and the open eyes are protected by the transparent third eyelid. The bird rises beak-first from the surface and flies back to its perch. At the perch the fish is adjusted until it is held near its tail and beaten against the perch several times. Once dead, the fish is positioned lengthways and swallowed head-first. A few times each day, a small greyish pellet of fish bones and other indigestible remains is regurgitated.

The food is mainly fish up to 12.5 cm (5 in) long, but the average size is 2.3 cm (7/8 in). In Central Europe, 97% of the diet was found to be composed of fish ranging in size from 2 to 10 cm with an average of 6.5 cm (body mass range from <0.1 g to >10 g, average 3 g). Minnows, sticklebacks, small roach and trout are typical prey. About 60% of food items are fish, but this kingfisher also catches aquatic insects such as dragonfly larvae and water beetles, and, in winter, crustaceans including freshwater shrimps. Amphibians such as the smooth newt (Lissotriton vulgaris) may also constitute part of the diet of this species. In Central Europe, however, fish represented 99.9% of the diet (data from rivers, streams, and reservoirs from years 1999 to 2013). Common kingfishers have also been observed to catch lamprey. One study found that food provisioning rate increased with brood size, from 1498 g (505 fishes for four nestlings) to 2968 g (894 fishes for eight nestlings). During the fledging period each chick consumed on average 334 g of fish, which resulted in an estimated daily food intake of 37% of the chick's body mass (average over the entire nestling period). The average daily energy intake was 73.5 kJ per chick (i.e., 1837 kJ per 25 days of the fledging period).

A challenge for any diving bird is the change in refraction between air and water. The eyes of many birds have two foveae (the fovea is the area of the retina with the greatest density of light receptors), and a kingfisher can switch from the main central fovea to the auxiliary fovea when it enters water; a retinal streak of high receptor density which connects the two foveae allows the image to swing temporally as the bird drops onto the prey. The egg-shaped lens of the eye points towards the auxiliary fovea, enabling the bird to maintain visual acuity underwater. Because of the positions of the foveae, the kingfisher has monocular vision in air, and binocular vision in water. The underwater vision is not as a sharp as in air, but the ability to judge the distance of moving prey is more important than the sharpness of the image.

Each cone cell of a bird's retina contains an oil droplet that may contain carotenoid pigments. These droplets enhance color vision and reduce glare. Aquatic kingfishers have high numbers of red pigments in their oil droplets; the reason red droplets predominate is not understood, but the droplets may help with the glare or the dispersion of light from particulate matter in the water.

== Status ==
This species has a large range, with an estimated global extent of occurrence of 10,000,000 km^{2} (3,900,000 sq mi). It has a large population, including an estimated 160,000–320,000 individuals in Europe alone. Global population trends have not been quantified, but populations appear to be stable so the species is not believed to approach the thresholds for the population decline criterion of the IUCN Red List (i.e., declining more than 30% in ten years or three generations). For these reasons, the species is evaluated as "least concern".

== In culture ==
With the help of a Motifs Advisory Group, the Governing Council of the European Central Bank selected the "kingfisher in a waterfall or runpool" as a potential front motif for the 2020s redesign of the 10€ banknote, with the reverse featuring the building of the European Commission.
