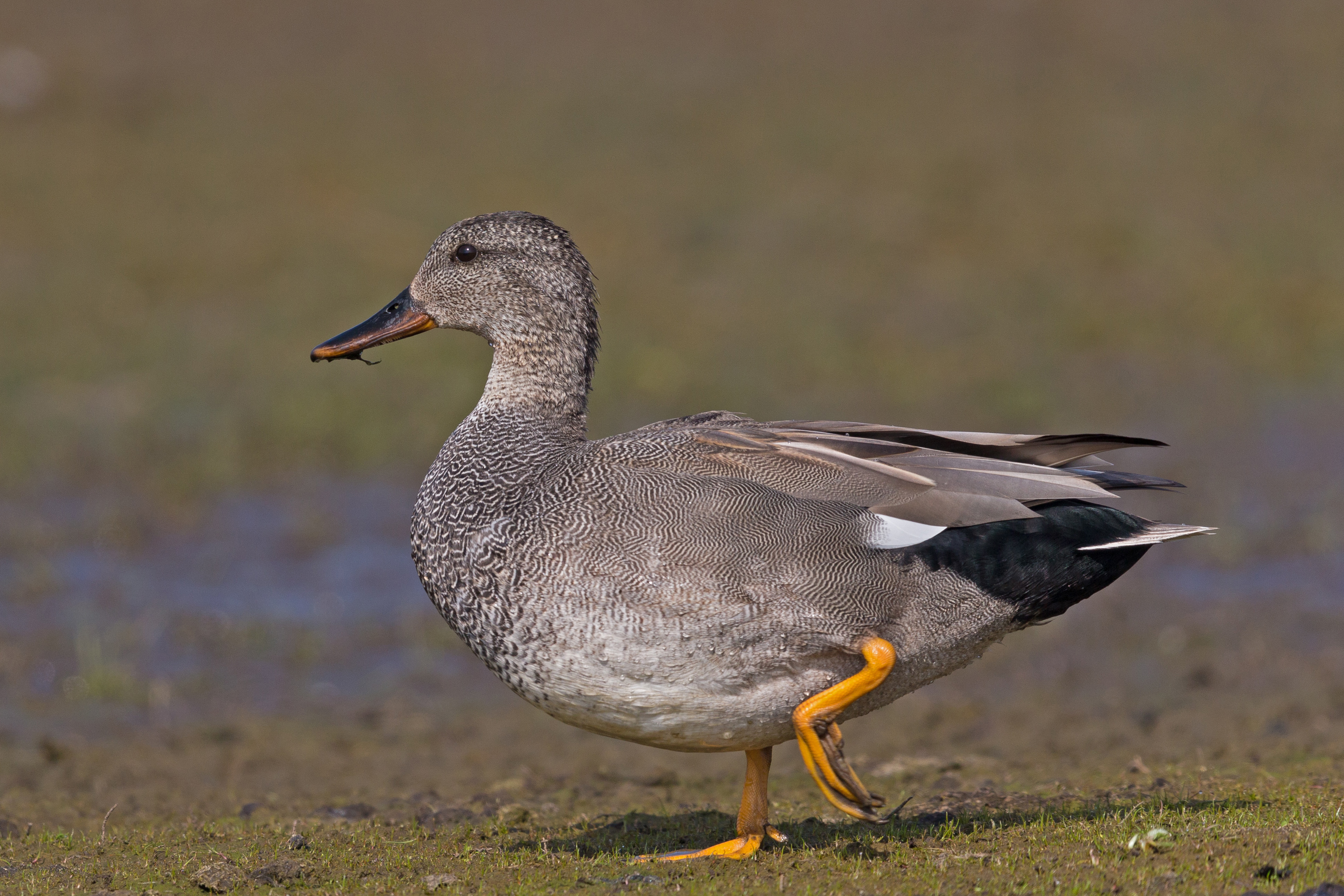
- Male
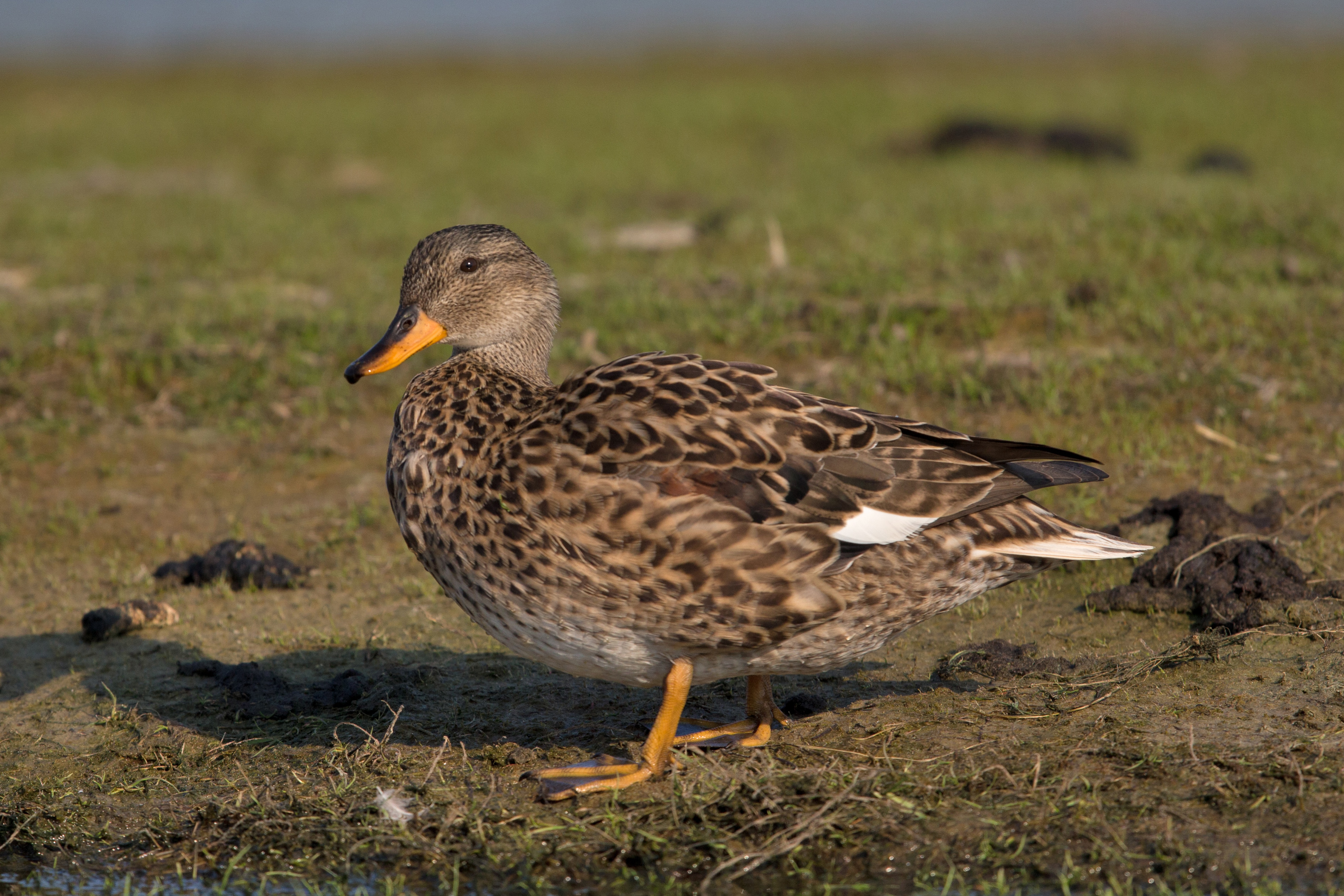
- Female

Conservation status
- Least Concern (IUCN 3.1)

Scientific classification
- Kingdom: Animalia
- Phylum: Chordata
- Class: Aves
- Order: Anseriformes
- Family: Anatidae
- Genus: Mareca
- Species: M. strepera

Binomial name
- Mareca strepera (Linnaeus, 1758)

Subspecies
- M. s. strepera (Linnaeus, 1758) (common gadwall); †M. s. couesi (Streets, 1876) (Coues's gadwall – extinct)

Synonyms
- Anas strepera Linnaeus, 1758

Audio
- Calls recorded in the Netherlands

= Gadwall =

Species of bird

The gadwall (Mareca strepera) is a common and widespread dabbling duck in the family Anatidae.

== Taxonomy ==
The gadwall was first described by Carl Linnaeus in his landmark 1758 10th edition of Systema Naturae. DNA studies have shown that it is a sister species with the falcated duck; the two are closely related to the three species of wigeons, and all of them have been assigned to the genus Mareca. There are two subspecies:

- Mareca strepera strepera (formerly Anas strepera strepera), the common gadwall, described by Linnaeus, is the nominate subspecies.
- †M. s. couesi (formerly A. s. couesi), Coues's gadwall, extinct c. 1874, was formerly found only on Teraina, a coral atoll in the Pacific Ocean.

The specific name strepera is Late Latin for "noisy". The etymology of the word gadwall is not known, but the name has been in use since 1666.

== Description ==
The gadwall is 47–58 cm (19–23 in) long with a 78–85 cm (31–33 in) wingspan. The male is slightly larger than the female, weighing on average 990 g (35 oz) against her 850 g (30 oz). The breeding male is patterned grey, with a black rear end, light chestnut wings, and a brilliant white speculum, obvious in flight or at rest. In non-breeding (eclipse) plumage, the drake looks more like the female, but retains the male wing pattern, and is usually greyer above and has less orange on the bill.

The female is light brown, with plumage much like a female mallard. It can be distinguished from that species by the dark orange-edged bill, smaller size, the white speculum, and white belly. Both sexes go through two moults annually, following a juvenile moult.

The gadwall is a quieter duck, except during its courtship display. Females give a call similar to the quack of a female mallard but higher-pitched, transcribed as gag-ag-ag-ag. Males give a grunt, transcribed as mep, and a whistle.

== Distribution ==
The gadwall breeds in the northern areas of Europe and across the Palearctic, and central North America. In North America, its breeding range lies along the Saint Lawrence River, through the Great Lakes, Alberta, Saskatchewan, the Dakotas, south to Kansas, west to California, and along coastal Pacific Canada and southern coastal Alaska. The range of this bird appears to be expanding into eastern North America. This dabbling duck is strongly migratory, and winters farther south than its breeding range, from coastal Alaska, south into Central America, and east into Idaho, Kansas, Ohio, Virginia, and then south all the way into Central America.

In Great Britain, the gadwall is a scarce-breeding bird and winter visitor, to places like the Farne Islands off the coast of Northumberland, though its population has increased in recent years. It is likely that its expansion was partly through introduction, mainly to England, and partly through colonization by continental birds staying to breed in Scotland. In Ireland a small breeding population has recently become established, centred on County Wexford in the south and Lough Neagh in the north. The Gadwall is also seen in some parts of South Asia, particularly the southern part of India.

== Behaviour ==
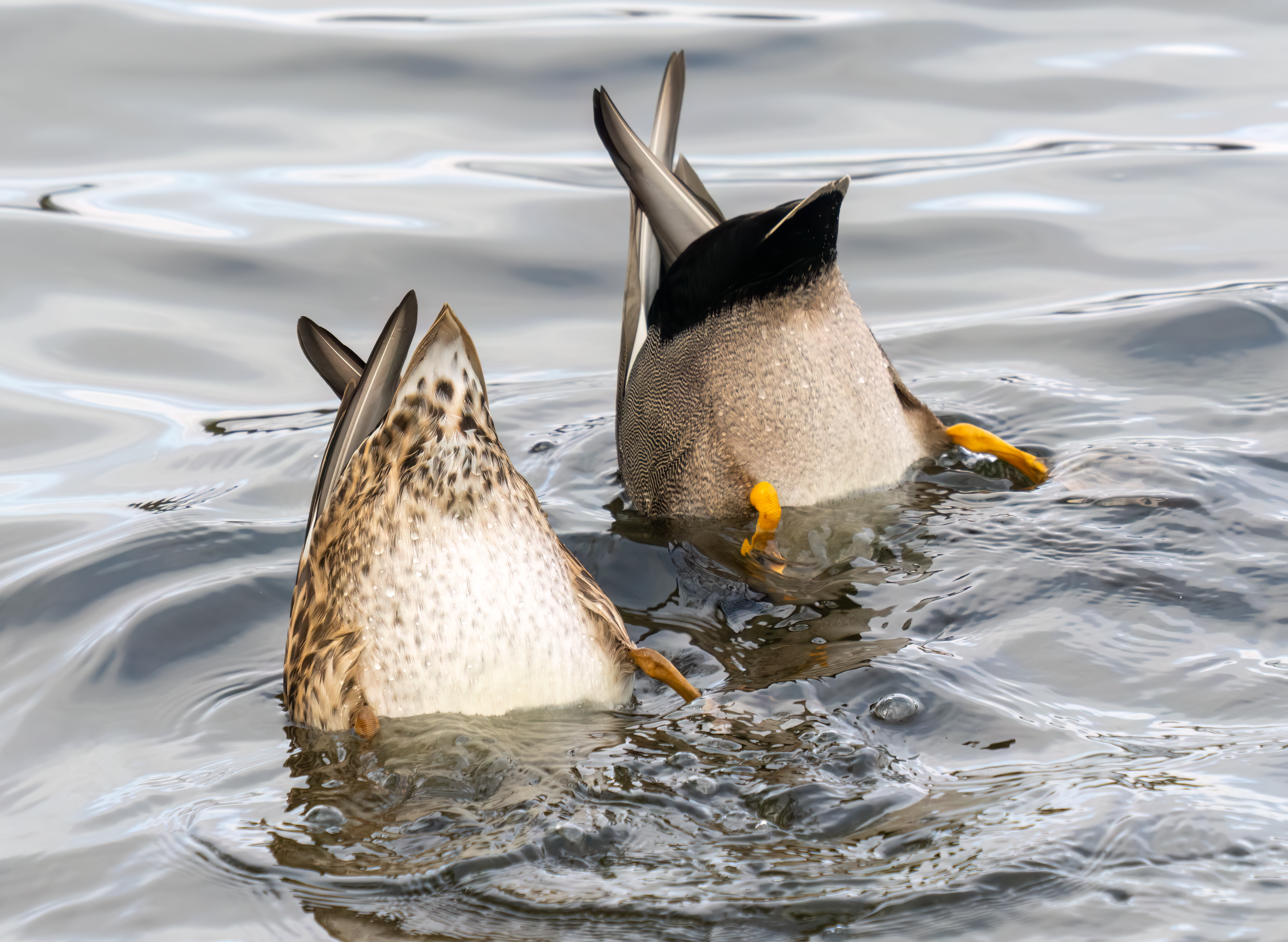
Female and male dabbling, Hyde Park, London

The gadwall is a bird of open wetlands, such as prairie or steppe lakes, wet grassland or marshes with dense fringing vegetation, and usually feeds by dabbling for plant food with head submerged. They can also dive underwater for food, more proficiently than other dabbling ducks, and may also steal food from diving birds such as coots. It nests on the ground, often some distance from water. It is not as gregarious as some dabbling ducks outside the breeding season and tends to form only small flocks.

Gadwalls are monogamous and may start breeding after their first year. Pair formation begins during fall migration or on breeding grounds, but has also been reported to occur in August when males are still in eclipse plumage. Gadwalls are generally quiet, except during courtship. The male utters a mep call during a display known as the burp, where he raises his head pointing his bill towards a female. The grunt-whistle is similar to that of mallards, where the male rears his outstretched head with the bill dipped into water, displacing a stream of water droplets towards a nearby female as the bill is raised against the chest. During this display the male makes a loud whistle call followed by a low burp. Paired males may follow other females in flight displays.

During nesting season, the female lays a clutch of 7–12 eggs with each of them measuring 4.9–6 cm (1.9–2.4 in) in length and 3.4–4.4 cm (1.3–1.7 in) in width. Incubation lasts for 24–27 days and the nestlings leave after around 1–2 days. A gadwall can only raise one brood a season

== Conservation ==
Currently, the gadwall is listed as least concern in the IUCN Red List of Threatened Species. The gadwall is one of the species to which the Agreement on the Conservation of African-Eurasian Migratory Waterbirds (AEWA) applies. Populations have increased approximately 2.5% over the course of 49 years (from 1966 to 2010), and continue to grow. Gadwalls are one of the most hunted duck species (3rd to the mallard and green-winged teal), with 1.7 million shot each year.

Because of the efforts of the United States and Canadian groups Ducks Unlimited, Delta Waterfowl Foundation and other private conservation groups, the species continues to be sustainably hunted there.

== Gallery ==
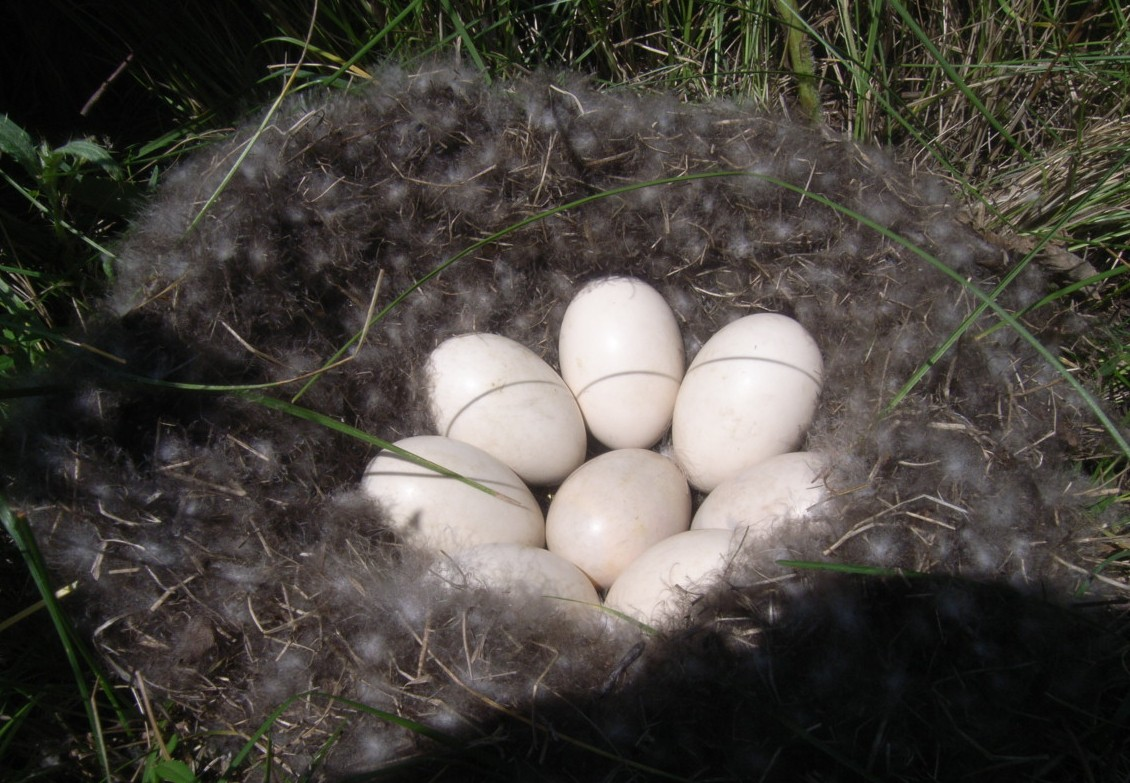
Nest lined with feathers

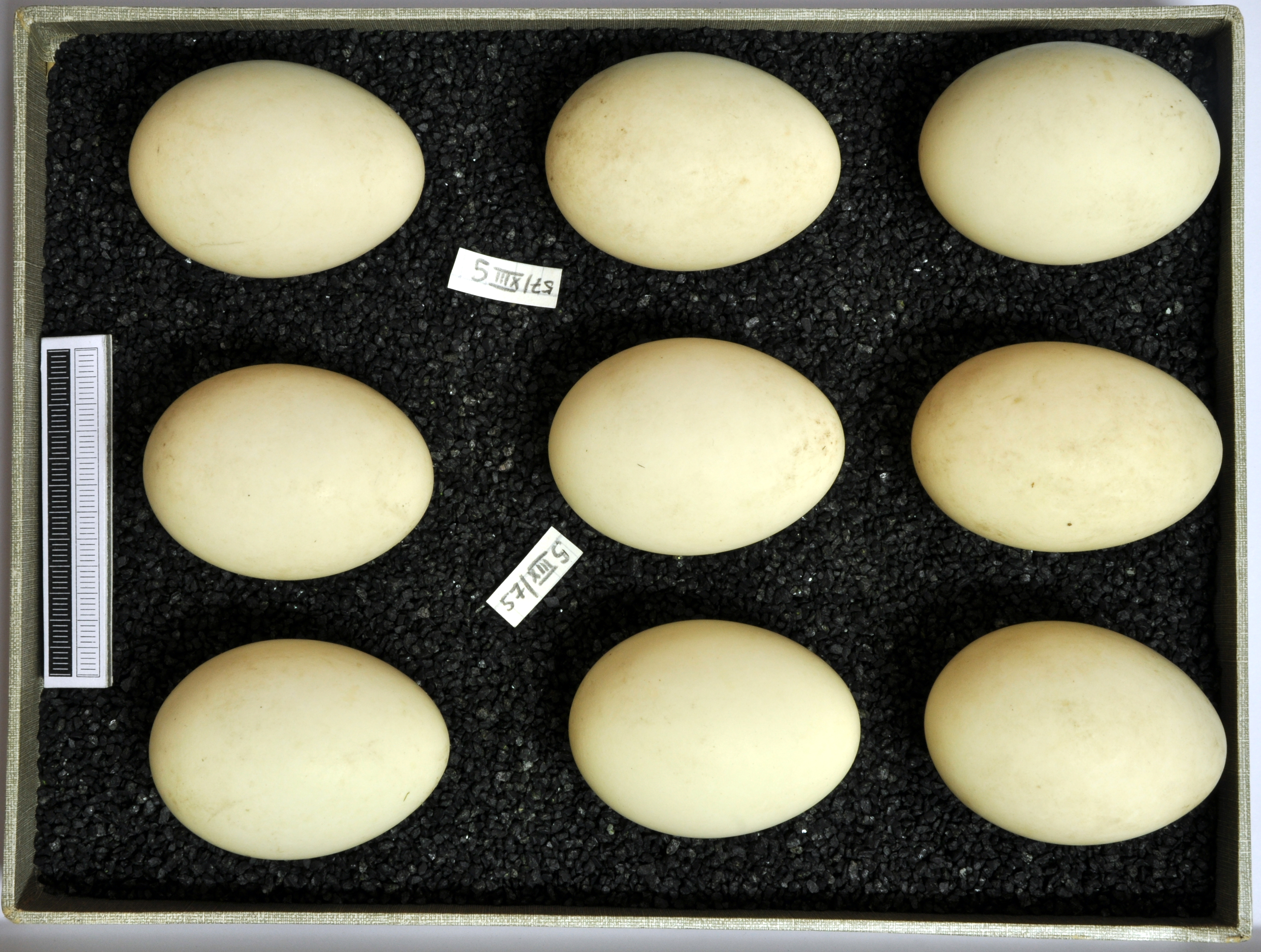
Eggs, collection Museum Wiesbaden

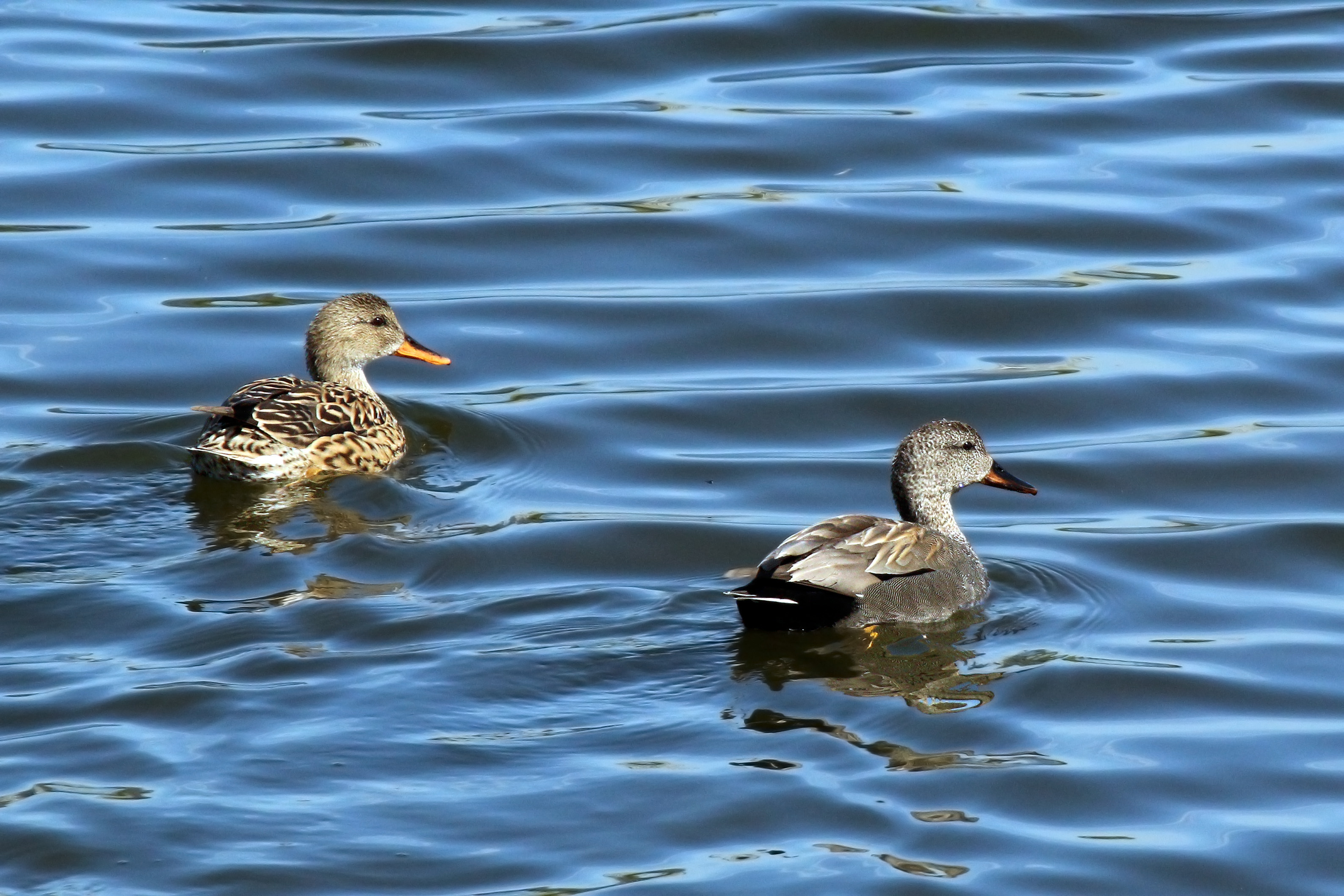
Female and male, WWT London Wetland Centre, Barnes

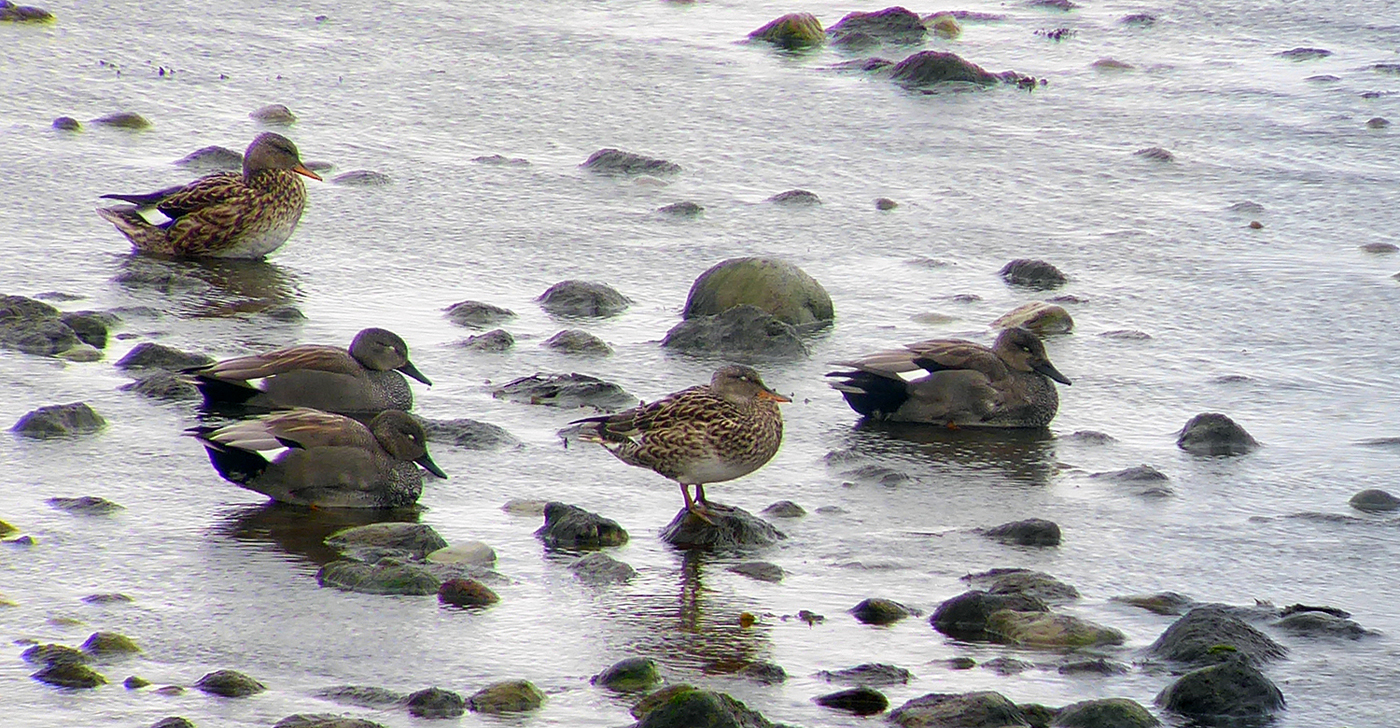
Three males and two females resting

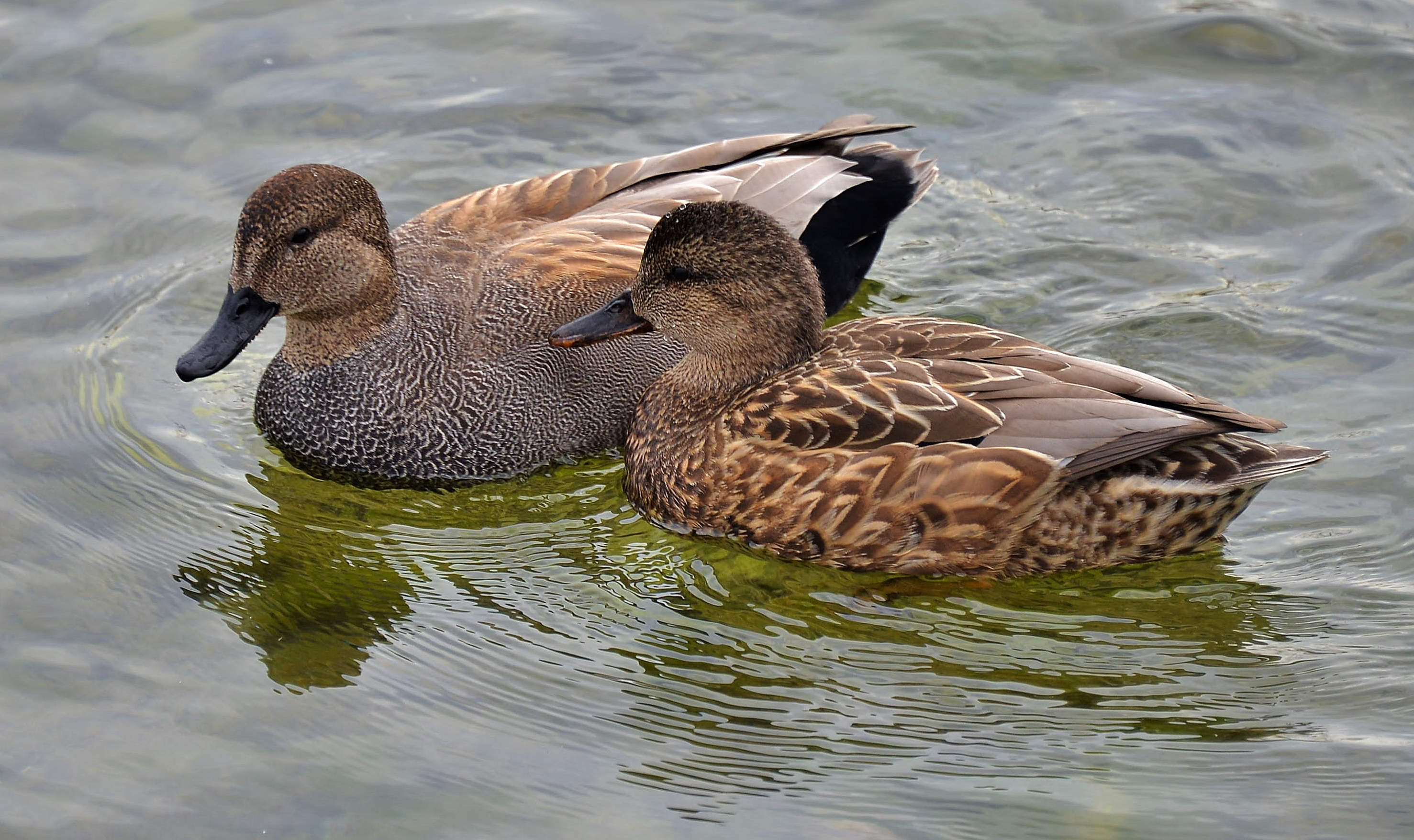
Male and female on the Lake Ontario

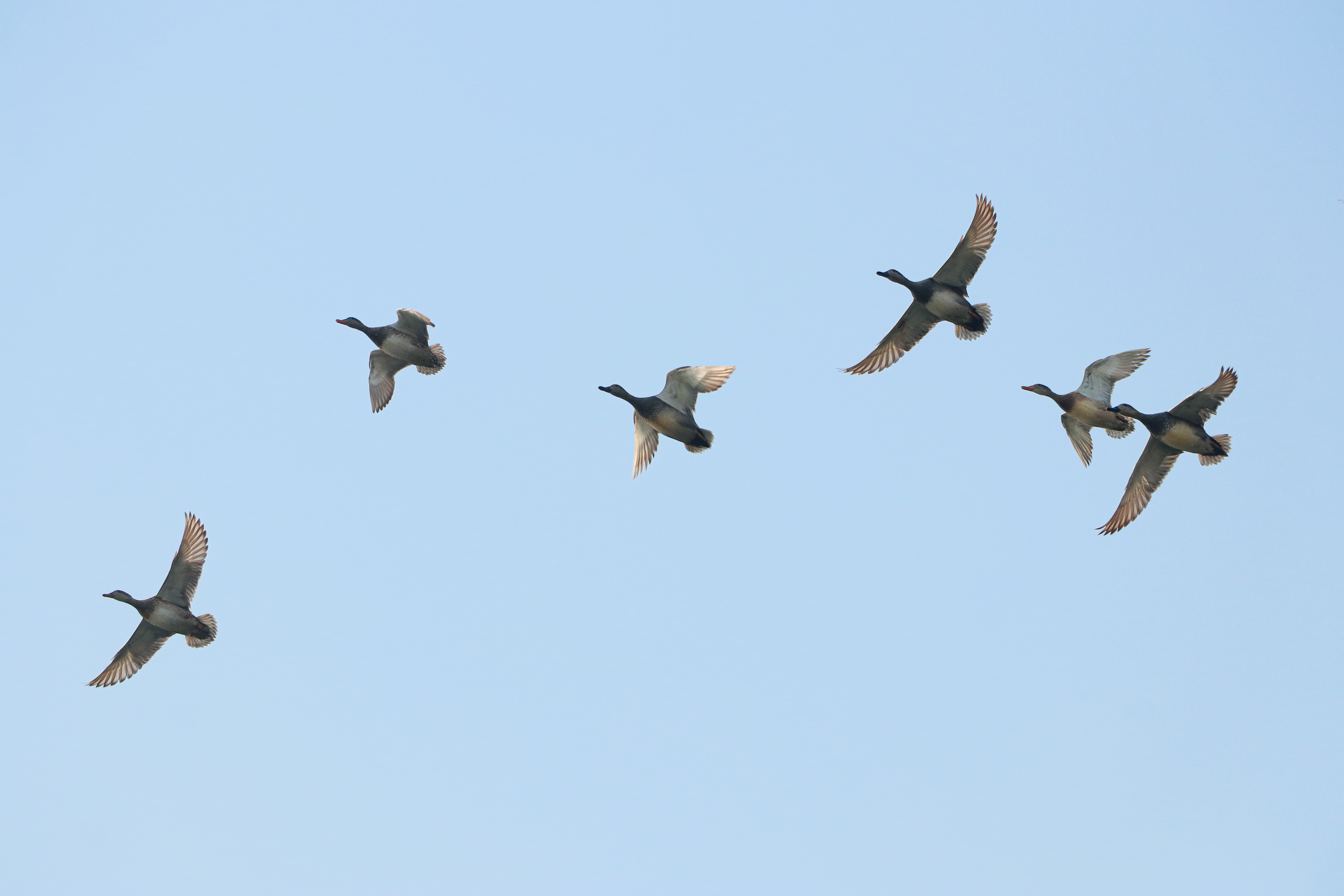
Gadwalls in flight, Taudaha Lake

Foraging male. Note the patch of missing breast plumage, suggestive of a survived predatory encounter.

Female flapping in Alberta
