= Taudaha Lake =

Lake in Nepal

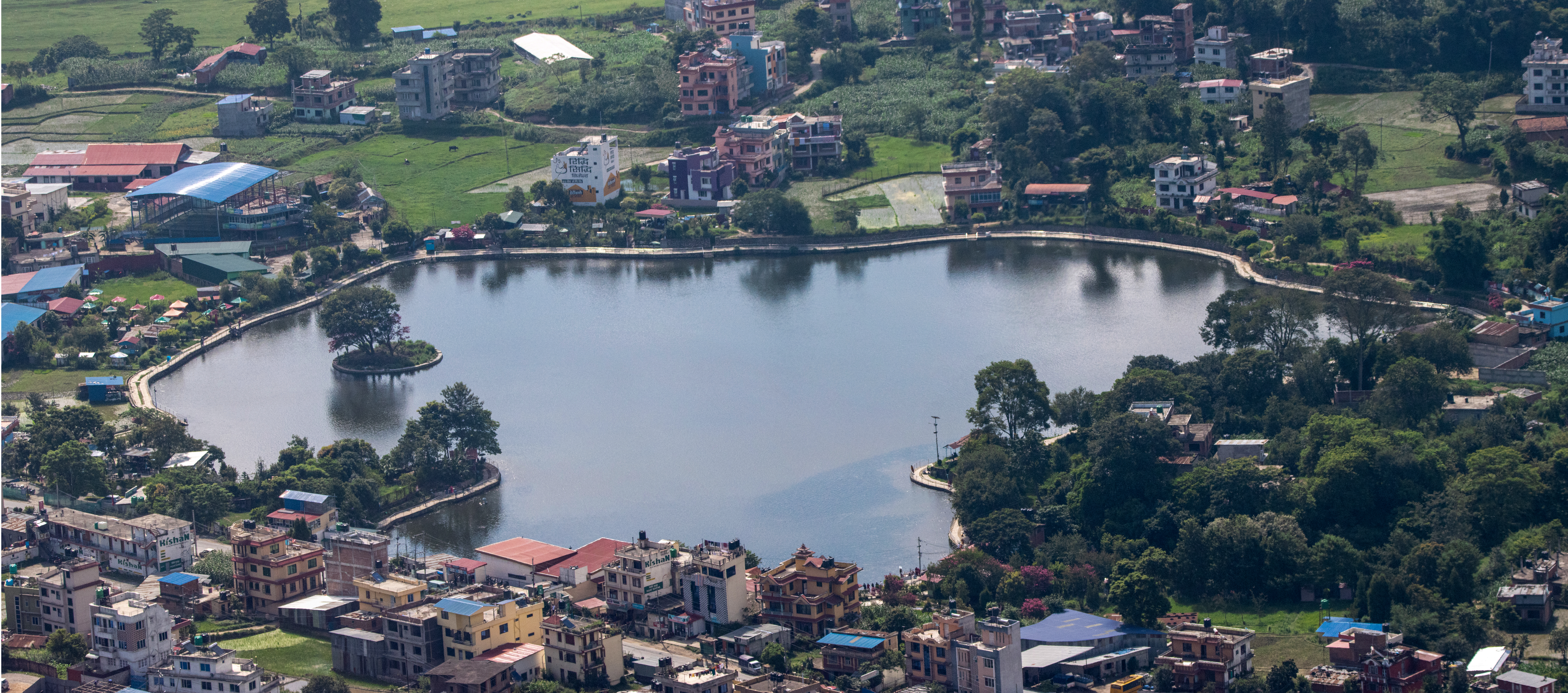
- Aerial view of Taudaha Lake

- Location in Nepal
- Location: Kathmandu District, Kirtipur
- Coordinates: 27.6487°N 85.2820°E
- Lake type: Freshwater
- Primary inflows: Generally natural waterbody but inlets from nearby irrigation of remaining field water
- Primary outflows: Overflows through two taps during rainy season
- Basin countries: Nepal
- Surface area: 463 hectares (1,140 acres)
- Settlements: Kirtipur

Taudaha Lake is a small lake in the outskirts of Kathmandu, in Nepal.

== Mythological origins ==
The name, Taudaha Lake, comes from a combination of Newari words 'Ta', meaning snake and 'Daha', which means lake. The lake is believed to be a remnant pool of the huge lake that once existed where now the city of Kathmandu sits. According to mythology, a Buddhist mythical character Manjushree cut the hill in the valley's south, allowing the lake's water to drain off, thereby creating land that was duly occupied by people. Folklore suggests that this "cut" in the hill is the Chobar Gorge, a narrow passage from which the Bagmati River exits the Kathmandu Valley. After the water of the ancient lake drained away, a few small lakes and ponds were created beyond the hills. Taudaha is believed to be one of those ponds.

When the lake was drained, countless nagas, mythological creatures that were half human and half serpent, were left homeless. This made the Naga King Karkotak livid. In order to allay his wrath, the locals living near Taudaha built an underwater palace, studded with precious stones and riches beyond imagination. The Serpent King was pleased and ruled his serpent subjects in their underwater kingdom. The king also promised to protect the humans living around the lake, on the condition that the tranquility of his water abode never be disrupted. It is due to this that even today locals do not swim or fish in the lake.

== Animals ==
Various species of birds have been recorded out of which many are residents, a few are summer migrants and rest are winter migrants. Some of the resident birds include the black kite, black drongo, cattle egret, Oriental magpie robin, common myna, jungle crow, rose-ringed parakeet, white-throated kingfisher and red-vented bulbul. Barn swallows and Indian cuckoos are summer visitors, while winter migrants include the great cormorant, ruddy shelduck, northern shoveler, mallard duck, gadwall, Eurasian coot, northern pintail and common teal.

There are many species of fishes in the lake. It is well known for large carps. Common carp, silver carp, grass carp, bighead carp and colourful carps have been introduced in the lake. These non-native species have disrupt the ecosystem and are out-competing the native species. Native fish species include catfishes and snakeheads.

Mammals such as the golden jackal, Indian grey mongoose and several rodents are found around the lake.

Checkered keelback and oriental garden lizard are frequently sighted reptile species.

== Migratory birds ==
The lake, arguably the only clean water body remaining in the Kathmandu Valley, is a stop over for numerous migratory bird species. In the winter, hundreds of water birds can be seen in and around the lake. Taudaha Lake is one of the important site for bird watching.

== Gallery ==
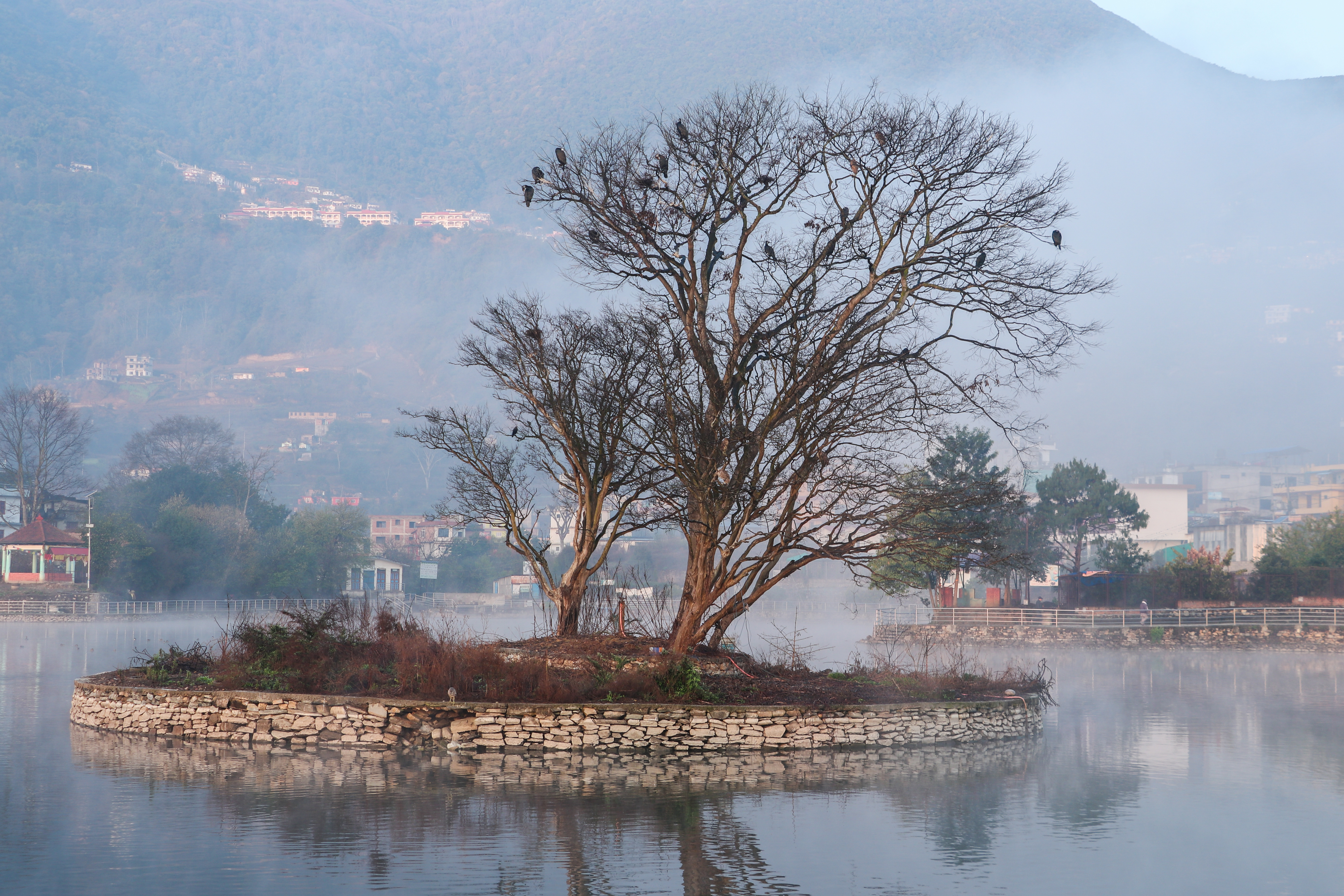
The small island of Taudaha Lake

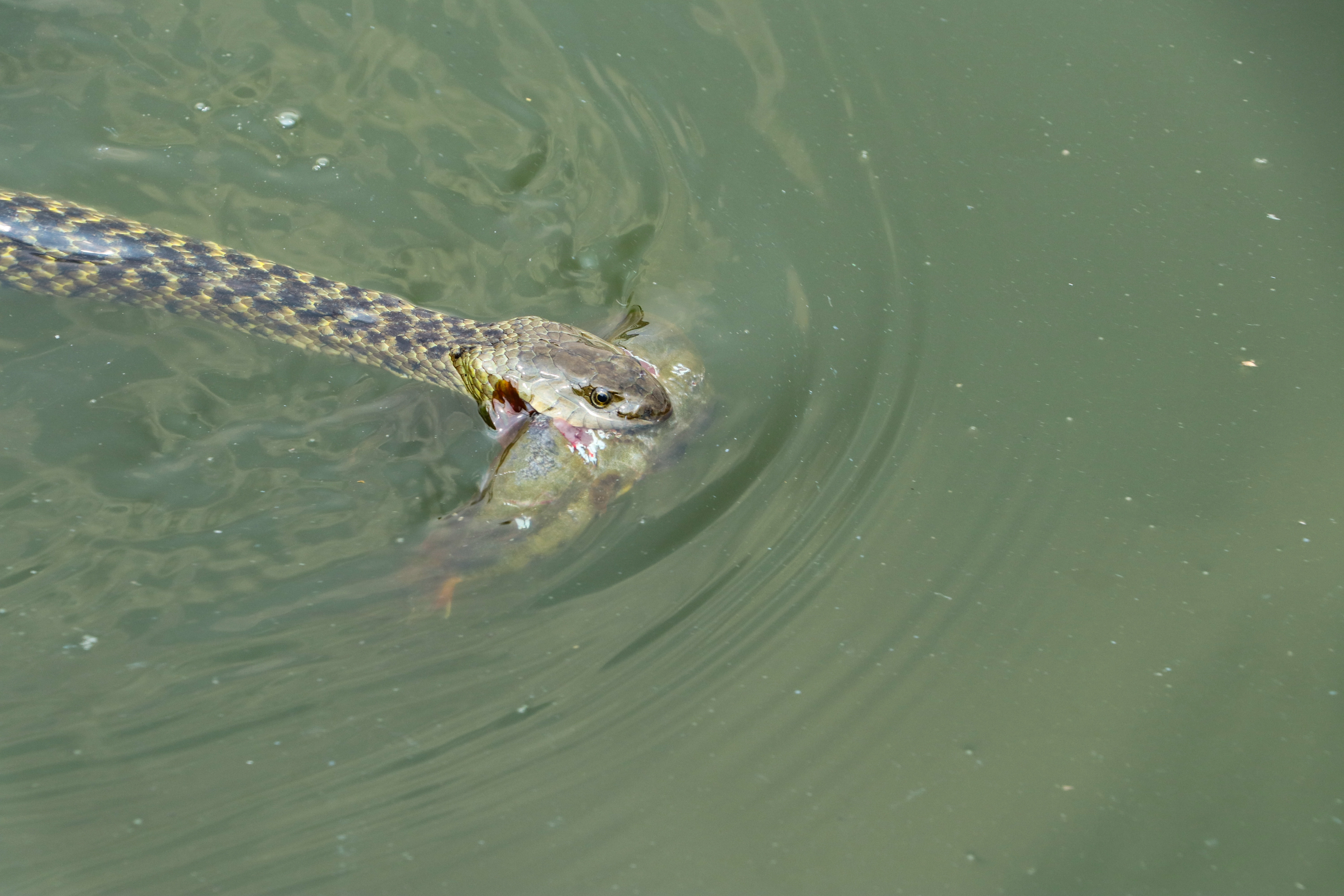
Checkered keelback at Taudaha Lake

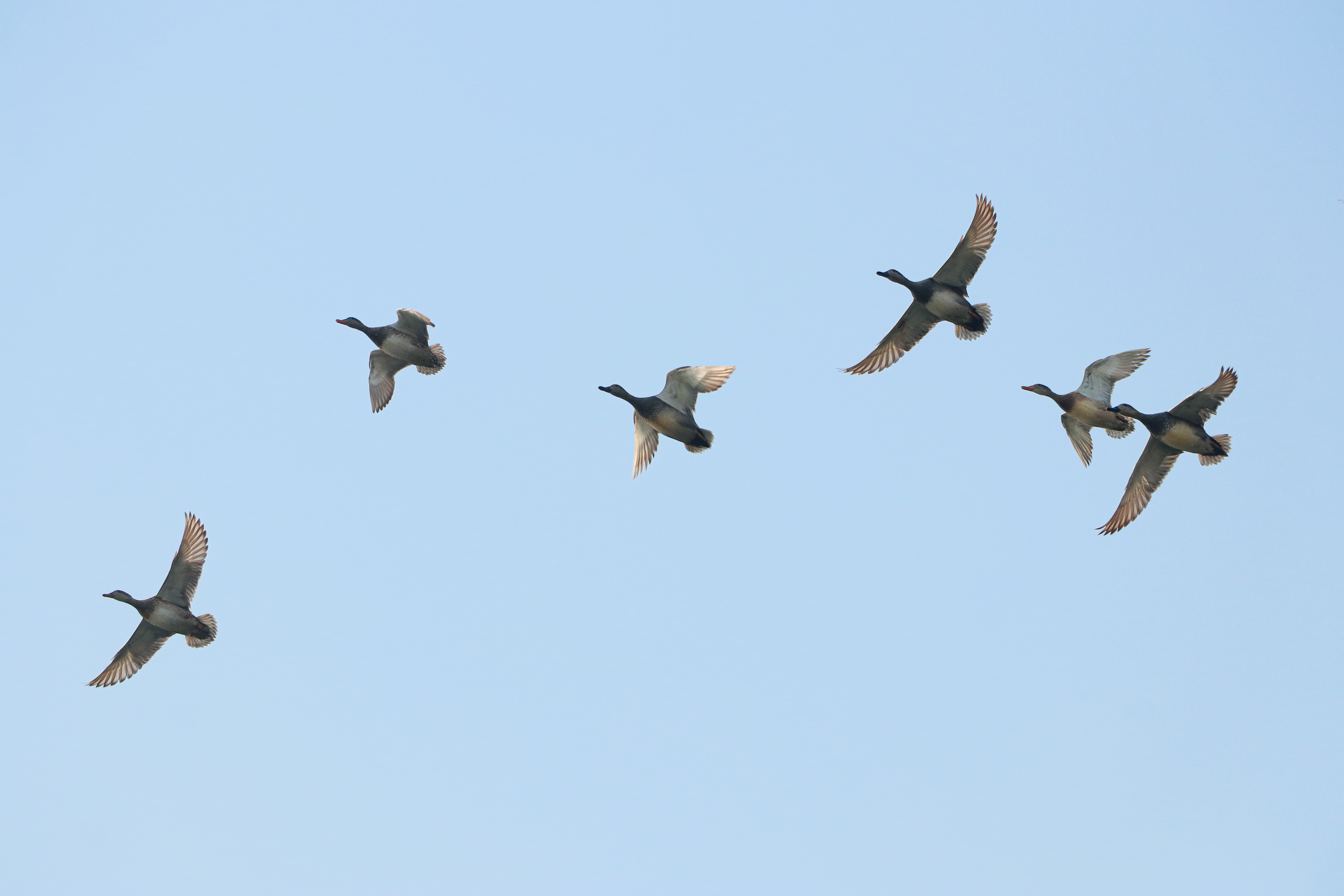
Gadwalls in flight

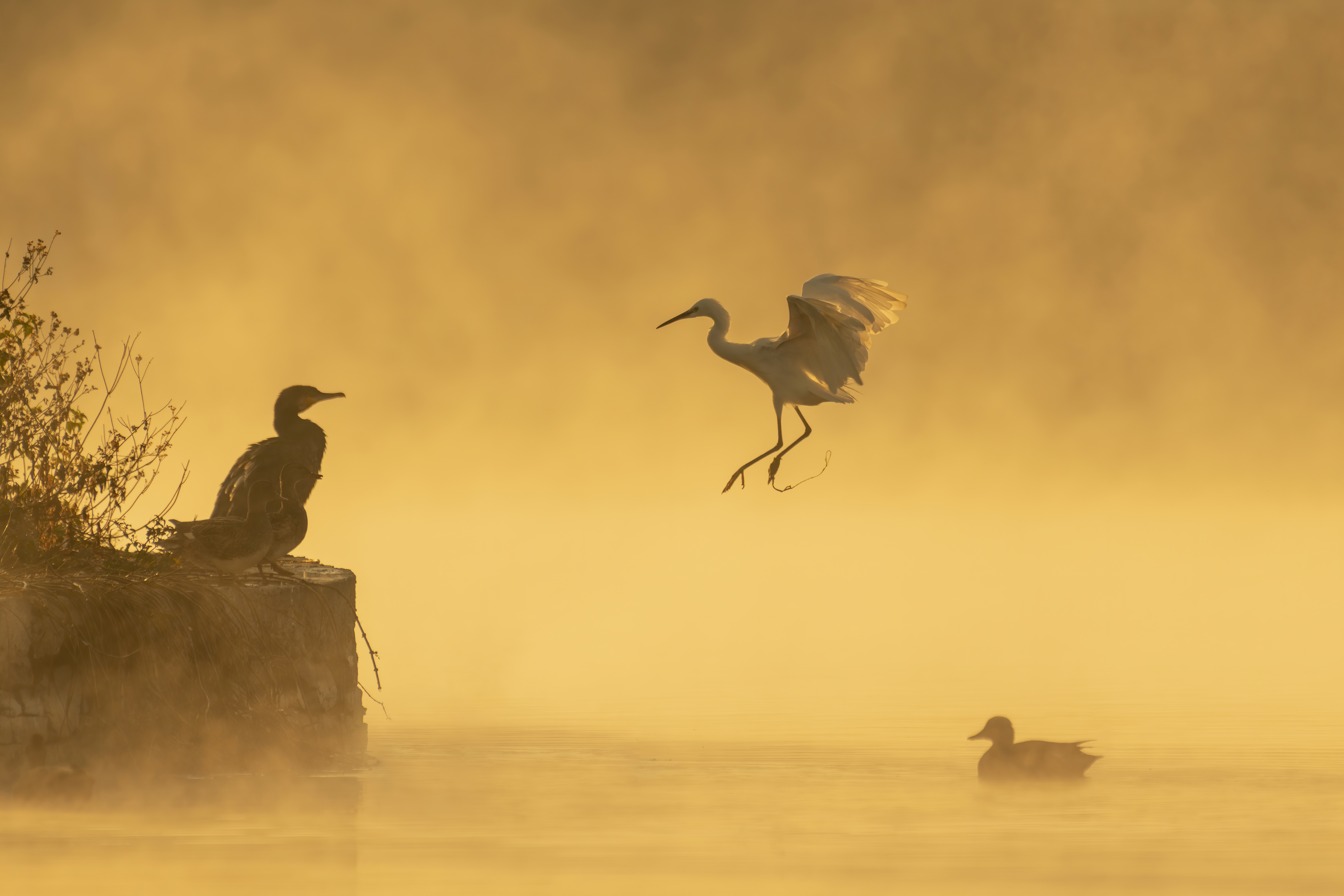
A great cormorant, little egret and gadwell duck in Taudaha Lake

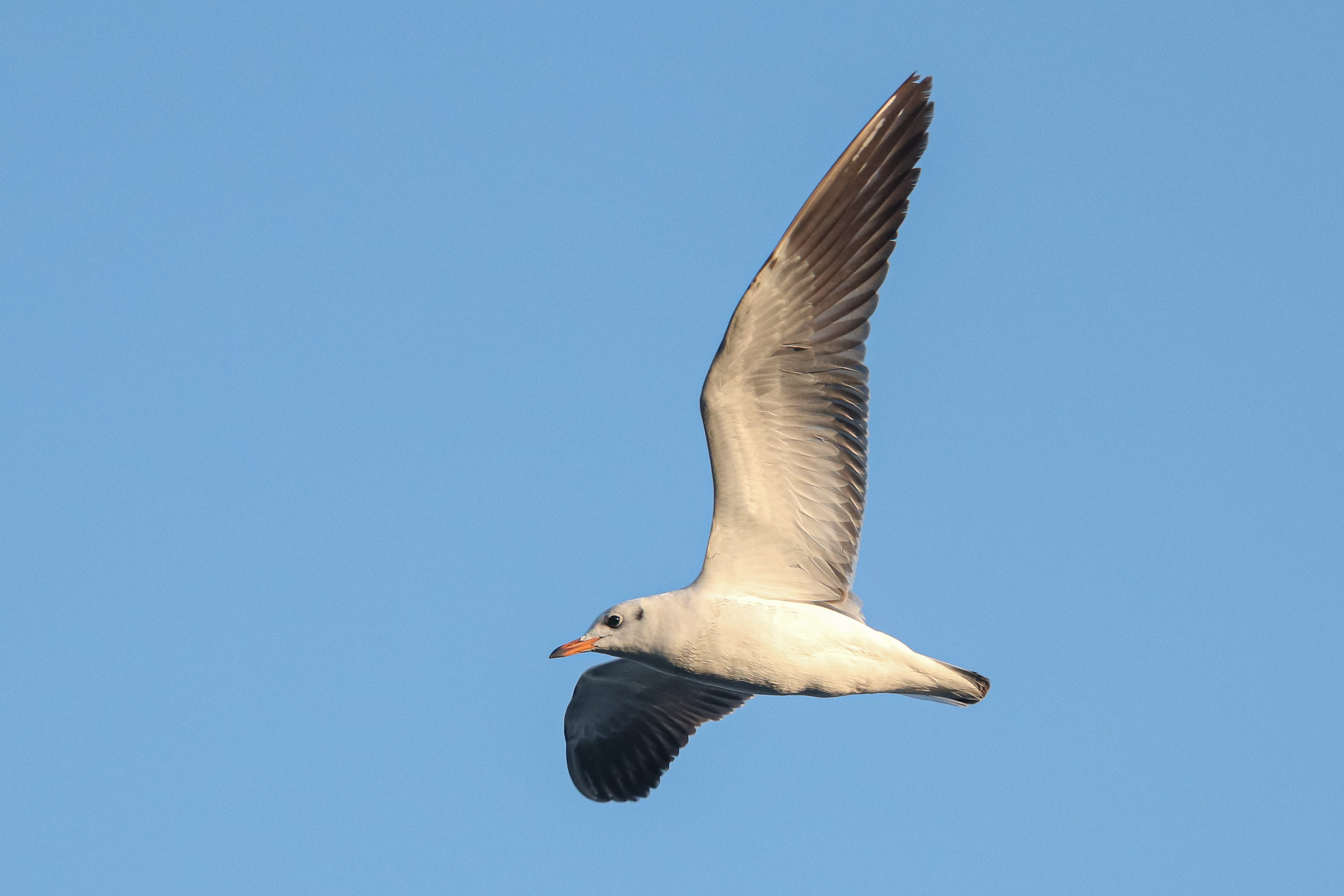
A gull flying over Taudaha Lake

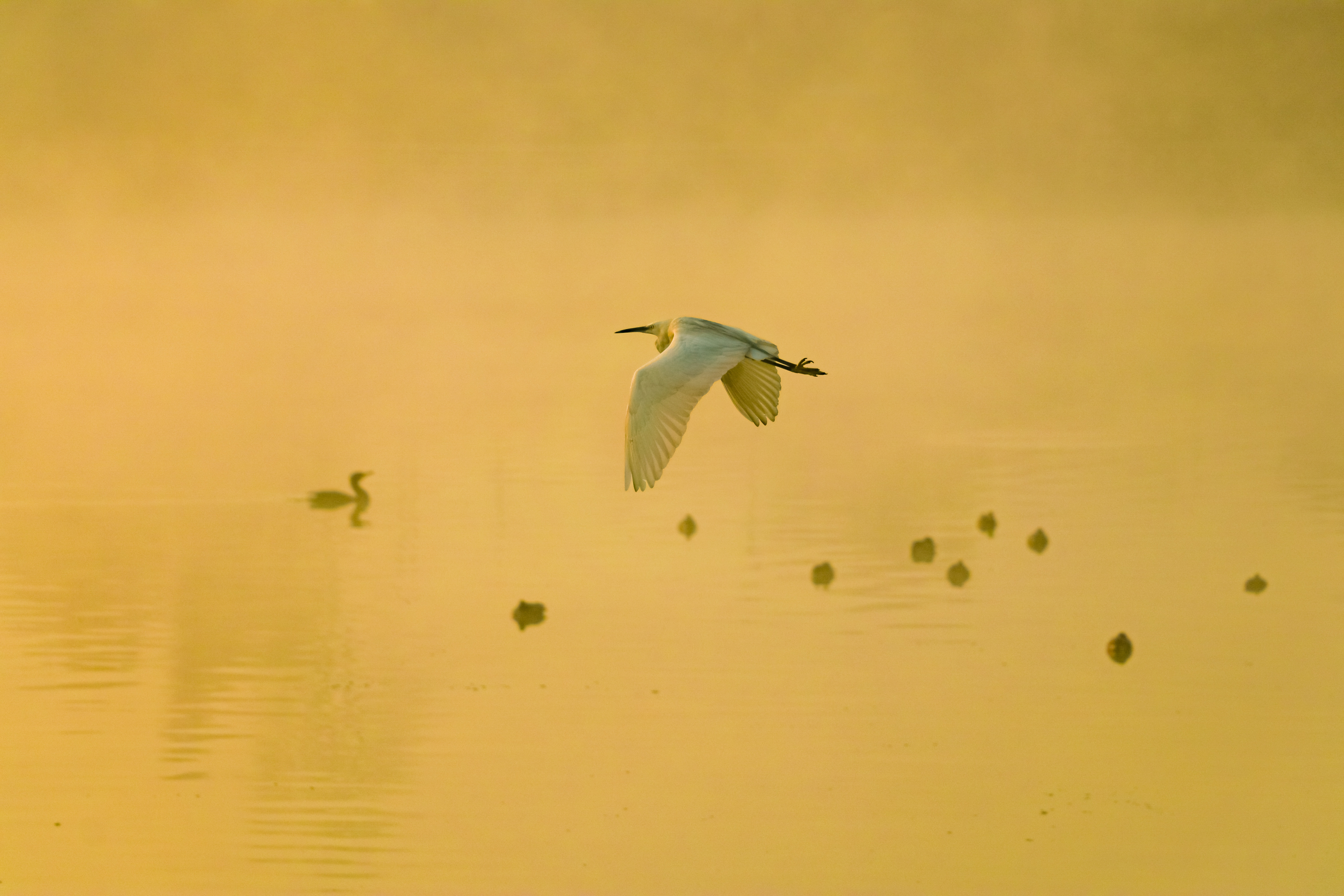
Birds at dawn at lake Taudaha and the fog illuminated by the sunlight

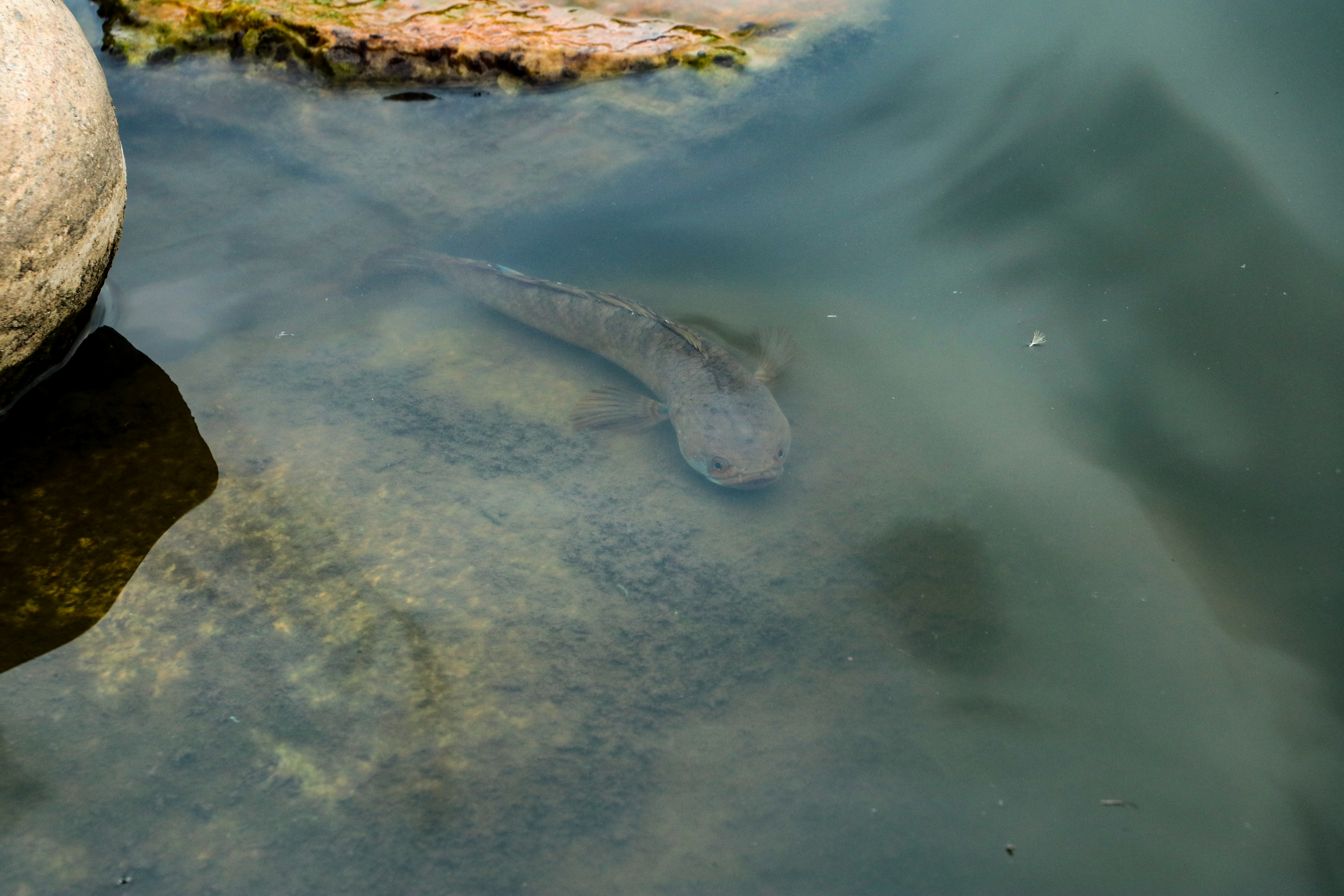
Snakehead at Taudaha Lake

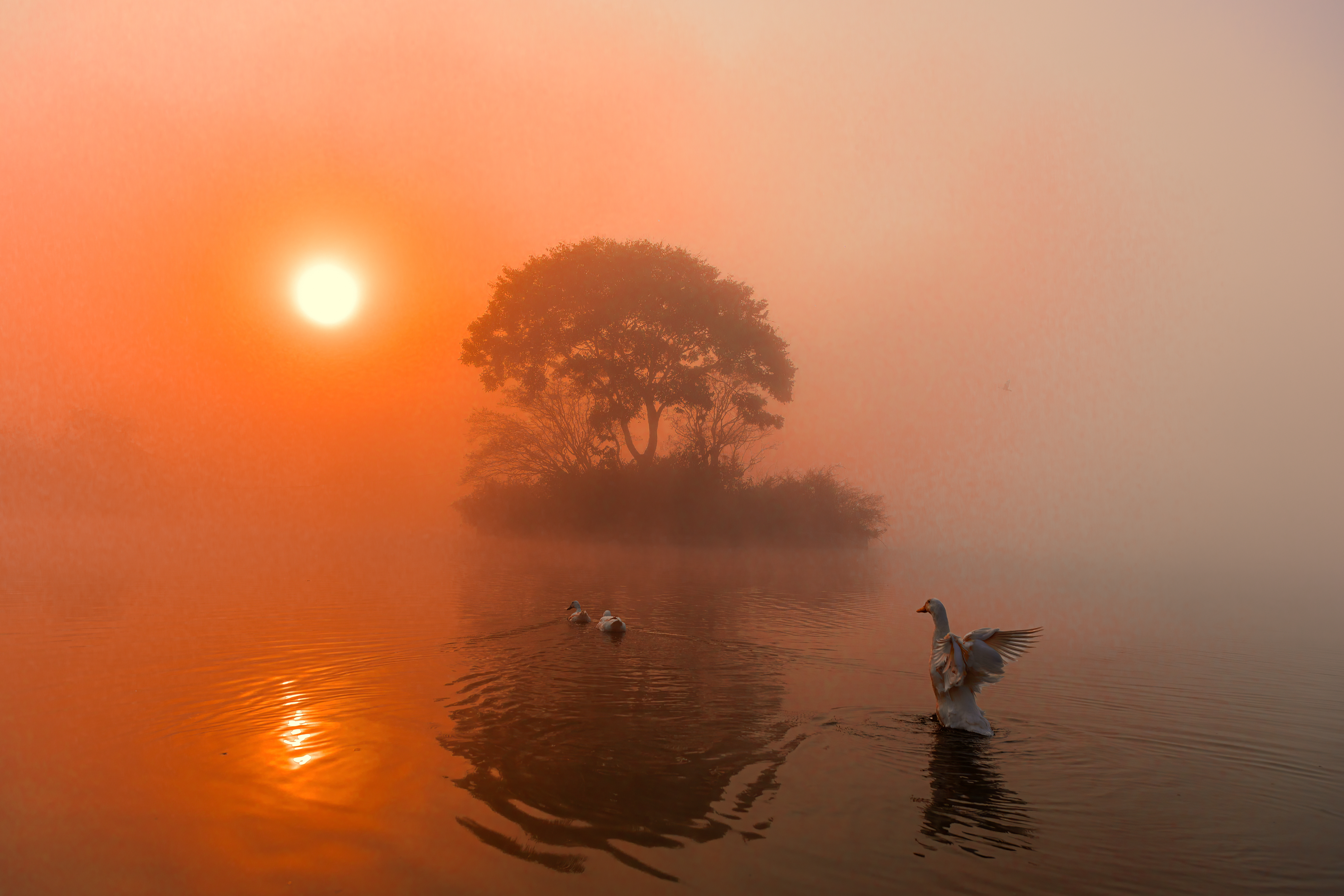

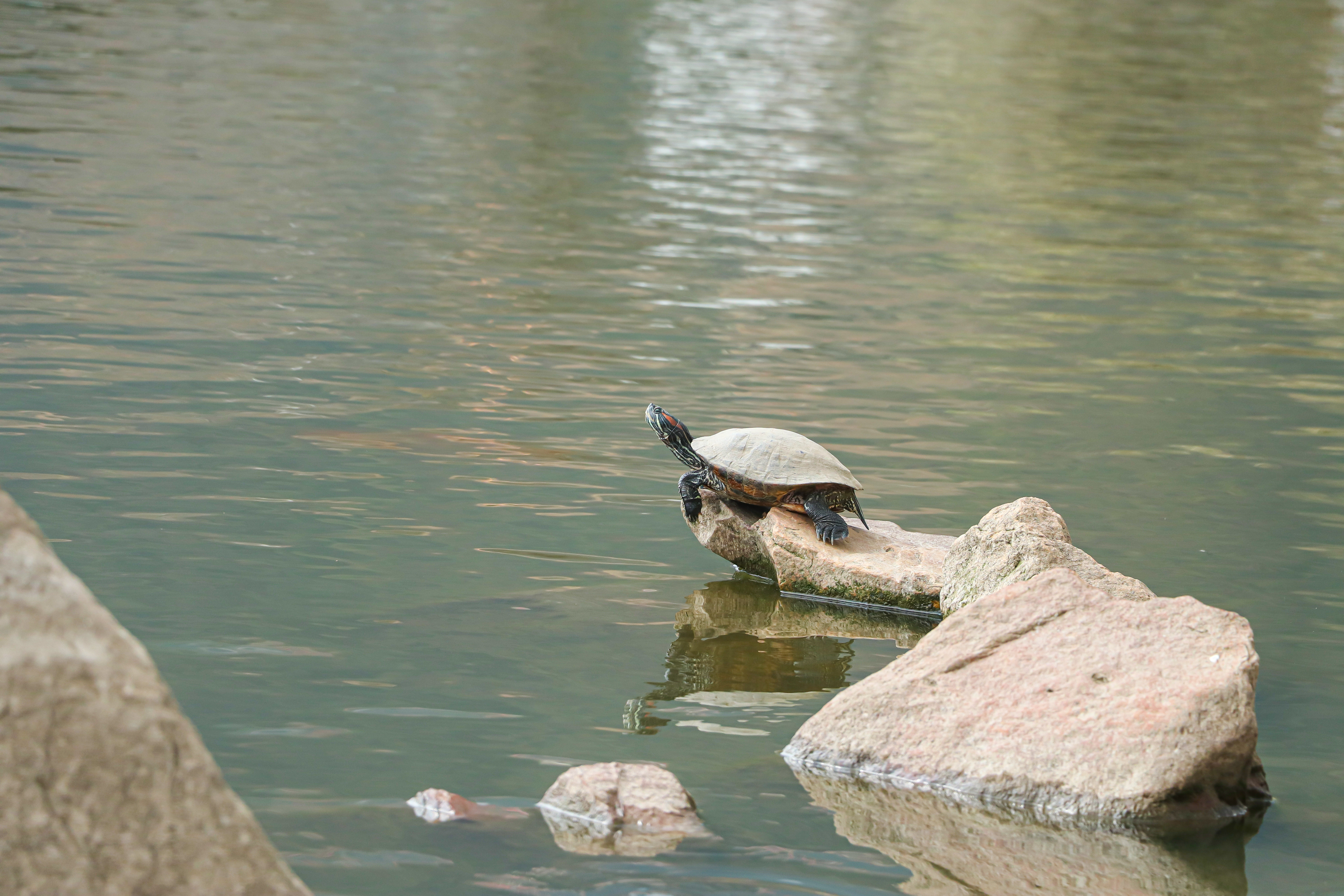
Red eared slider turtle basking at Taudaha Lake

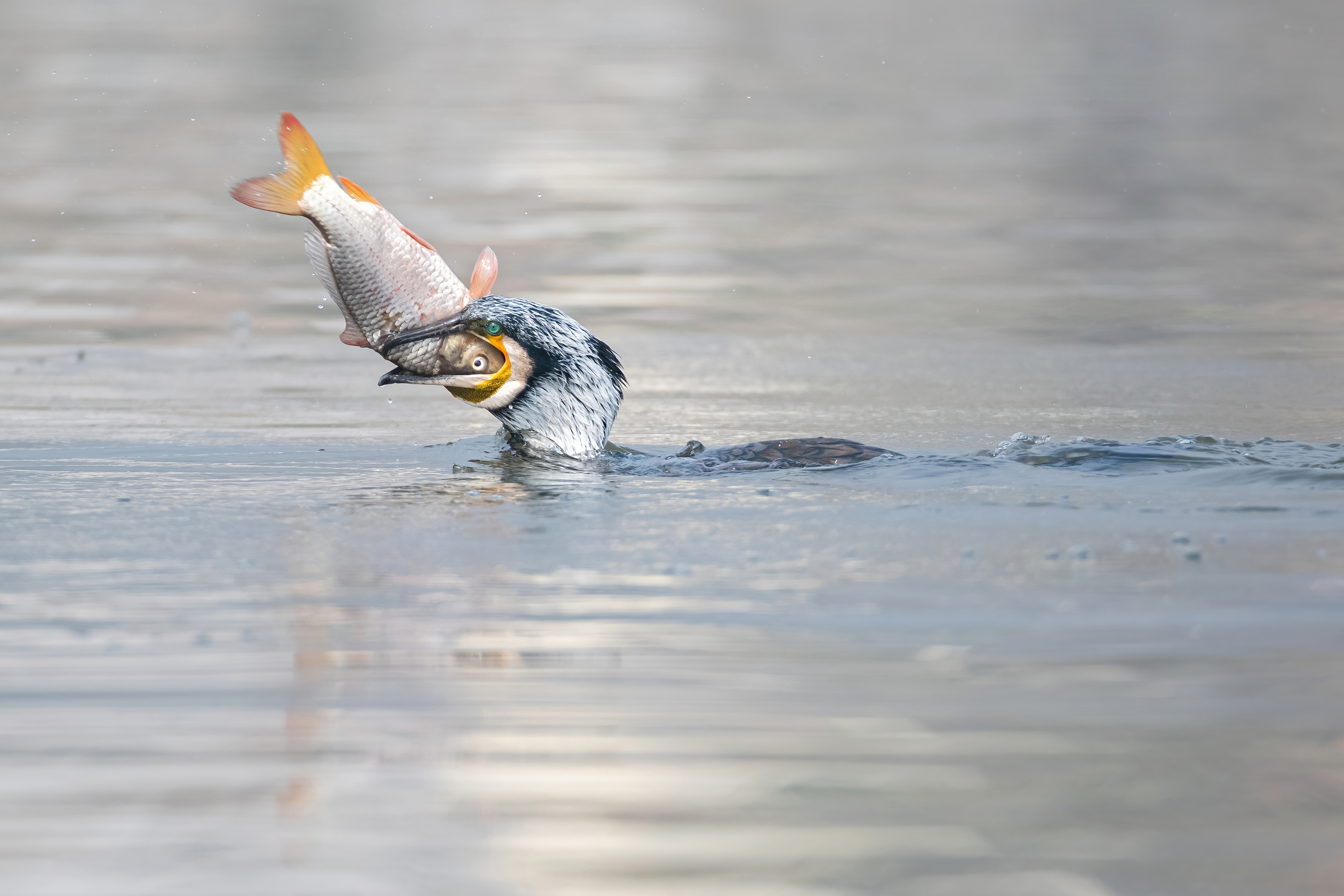
Great cormorant swallowing carp fish

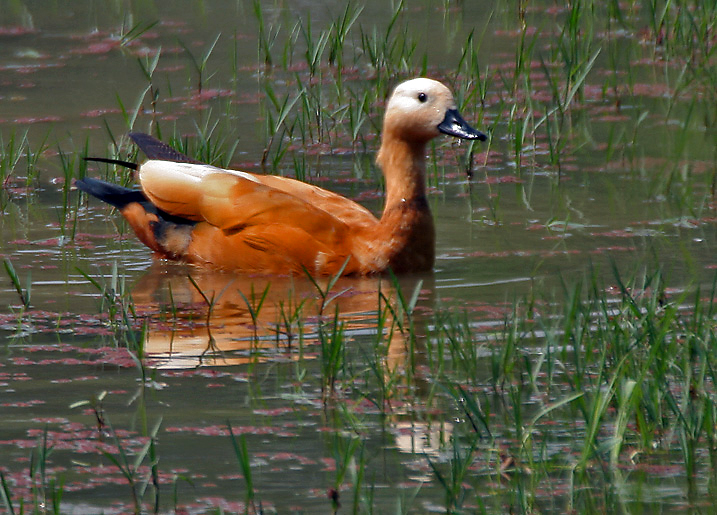
Ruddy shelduck

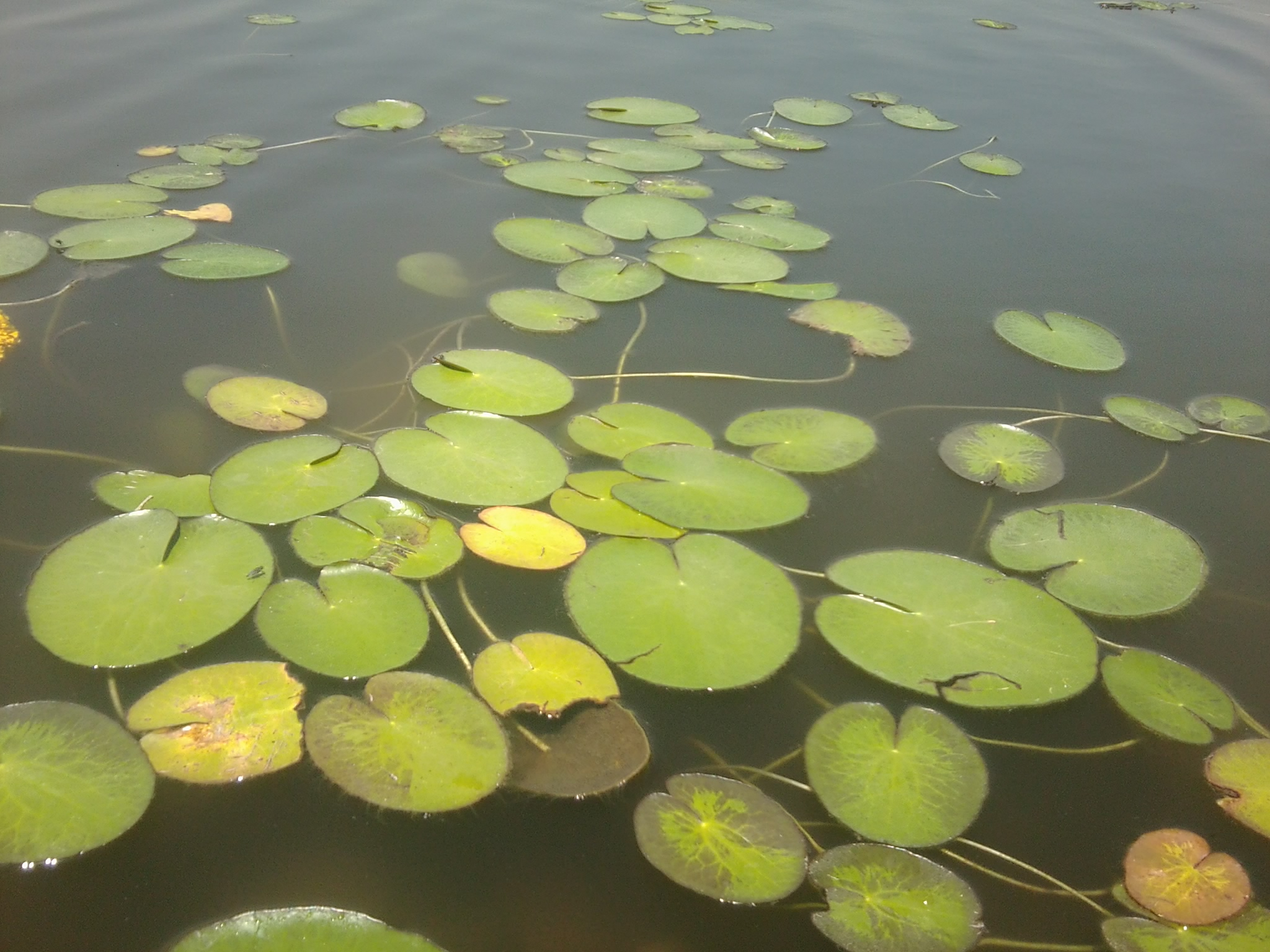
Lotus growing in Taudaha Lake

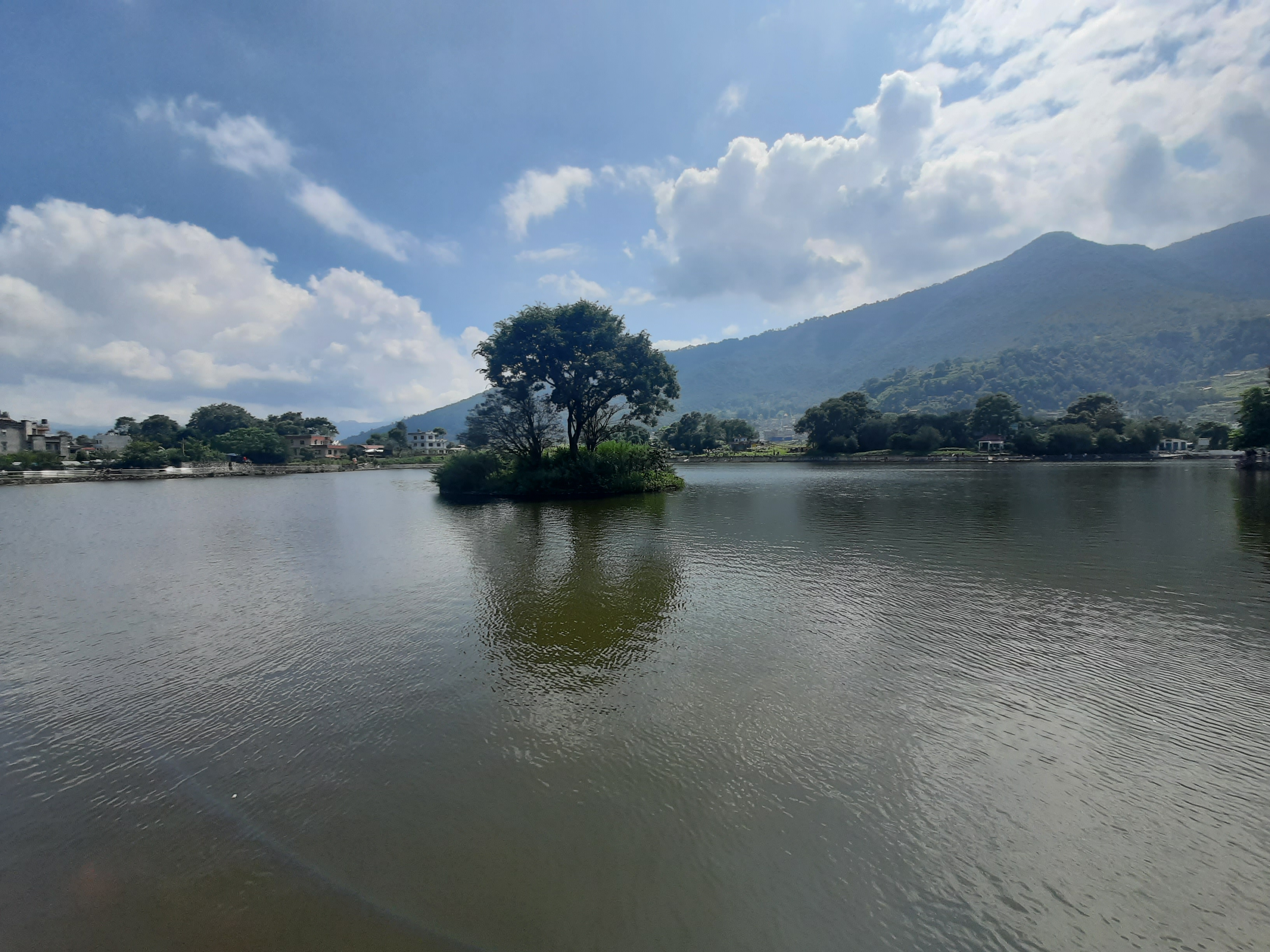
View of Taudaha Lake
