= Rainbow Peak =

Mountain in Montana, United States

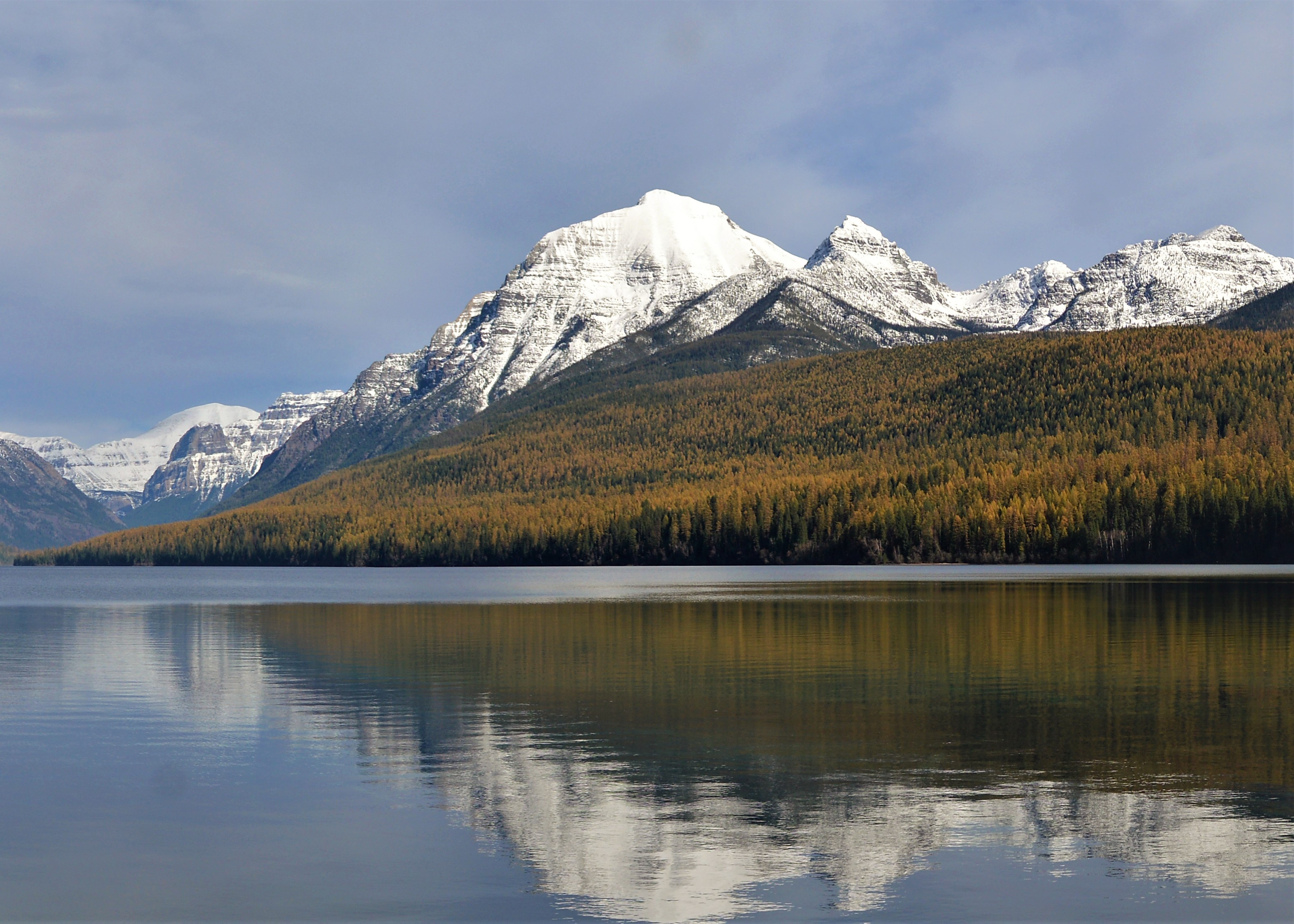
- Rainbow Peak centered, with Bowman Lake in the foreground

Highest point
- Elevation: 9,895 ft (3,016 m)
- Prominence: 3,636 ft (1,108 m)
- Coordinates: 48°52′45″N 114°05′49″W

Geography
- Location within Montana Location within the United States
- Location: Flathead County, Montana, U.S.
- Parent range: Livingston Range
- Topo map(s): USGS Mount Carter, MT

Climbing
- Easiest route: class 3

Rainbow Peak (9,895 feet (3,016 m)) is located in the Livingston Range, Glacier National Park in the U.S. state of Montana. The namesake Rainbow Glacier is immediately east and northeast of Rainbow Peak. Rainbow Peak is the ninth-tallest mountain in Glacier National Park and rises over 1 mile (1.6 km) above Bowman Lake. From the parking lot at the Bowman Lake Campground, the elevation gain is 5,865 ft (1,788 m).

In July 1998 the peak was the site of the death of two climbers who were climbing a snow-covered chimney when a cornice collapsed, causing the two climbers to fall to their deaths.

== See also ==
- List of mountains and mountain ranges of Glacier National Park (U.S.)
