= Rainbow Glacier =

Glacier in Montana, United States

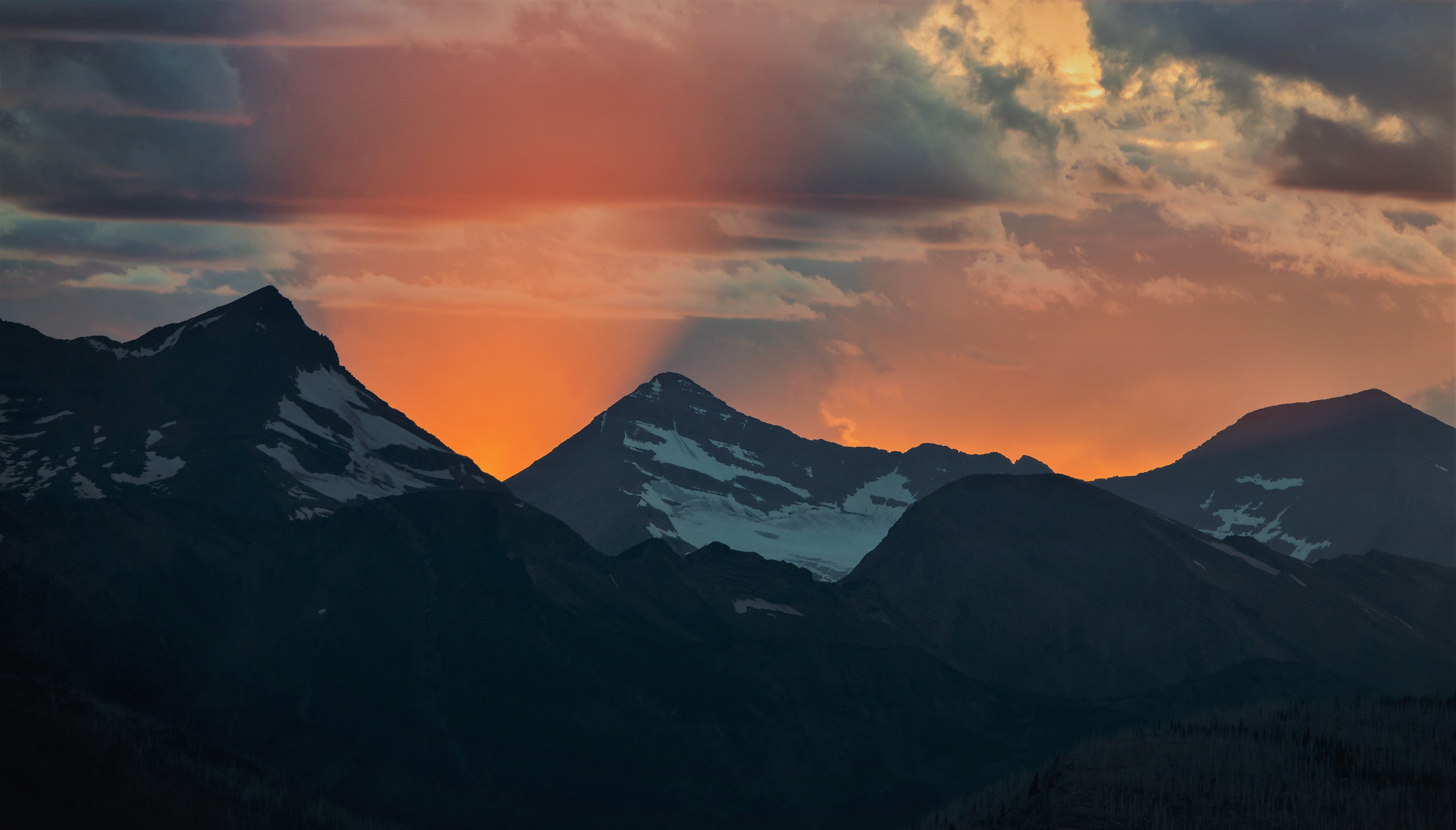
- Rainbow Peak and Rainbow Glacier centered

- Location within Montana
- Type: Mountain glacier
- Location: Glacier National Park, Flathead County, Montana, United States
- Coordinates: 48°52′45″N 114°05′13″W
- Area: Approximately 287 acres (1.16 km^{2}) in 2005
- Terminus: Barren rock
- Status: Retreating

Rainbow Glacier is in Glacier National Park in the U.S. state of Montana. The glacier is situated immediately to the east of Rainbow Peak at an elevation between 8,500 feet (2,600 m) and 8,000 feet (2,400 m) above sea level. The glacier covers an area of approximately 287 acres (1.16 km^{2}) and has visible crevasses in satellite imagery. Rainbow Glacier has shown modest retreat compared to other glaciers in Glacier National Park, and lost just over 9 percent of its surface area between 1966 and 2005.

== See also ==
- List of glaciers in the United States
- Glaciers in Glacier National Park (U.S.)
