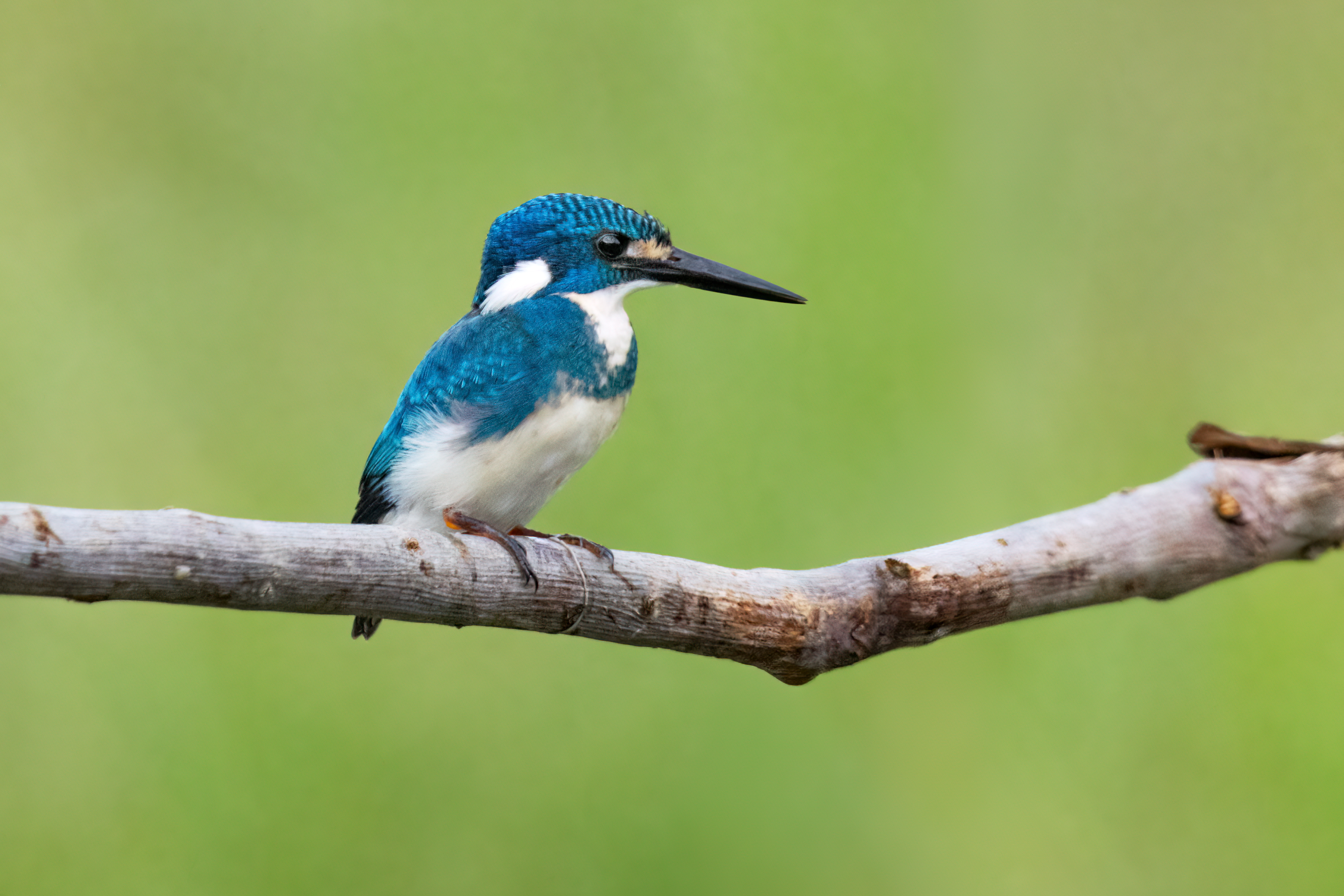

Conservation status
- Least Concern (IUCN 3.1)

Scientific classification
- Kingdom: Animalia
- Phylum: Chordata
- Class: Aves
- Order: Coraciiformes
- Family: Alcedinidae
- Subfamily: Alcedininae
- Genus: Alcedo
- Species: A. coerulescens

Binomial name
- Alcedo coerulescens Vieillot, 1818

= Cerulean kingfisher =

Species of bird

The cerulean kingfisher (Alcedo coerulescens) is a kingfisher in the subfamily Alcedininae which is native to parts of Indonesia. With an overall metallic blue impression, it is very similar to the common kingfisher, but it is white underneath instead of orange. Males average bluer than females, which have a greenish cast. It is sometimes called the small blue kingfisher but in Indonesia and parts of Asia that name refers to Alcedo atthis (common kingfisher).

== Taxonomy ==
The first formal description of the cerulean kingfisher was by the French ornithologist Louis Pierre Vieillot in 1818. He coined the binomial name Alcedo coerulescens. The specific epithet coerulescens is from the Latin caerulescens meaning "bluish". The species is monotypic.

== Description ==
The cerulean kingfisher is a small kingfisher with a length of 13 cm (5.1 in). The upperparts are a range of shades of blue with white lores and a prominent white patch on each side of the neck. The underparts are white with an azure-blue breast-band. The bill is blackish and the legs are dark brown. The female has duller and slightly greenish plumage and a narrower breast band.

== Distribution and habitat ==
The cerulean kingfisher is native to Sumatra, Java, the Kangean Islands, Bali, Lombok and Sumbawa, all in Indonesia. It is a resident species that inhabits low-lying areas near streams, canals, flooded paddy-fields and tidal estuaries.
