= Pygmy kingfisher =

Pygmy kingfisher may refer to:

== Subfamily ==
- River kingfisher, the subfamily Alcedininae

== Species ==
- African pygmy kingfisher, Ispidina picta
- American pygmy kingfisher, Chloroceryle aenea
- Madagascar pygmy kingfisher, Corythornis madagascariensis
