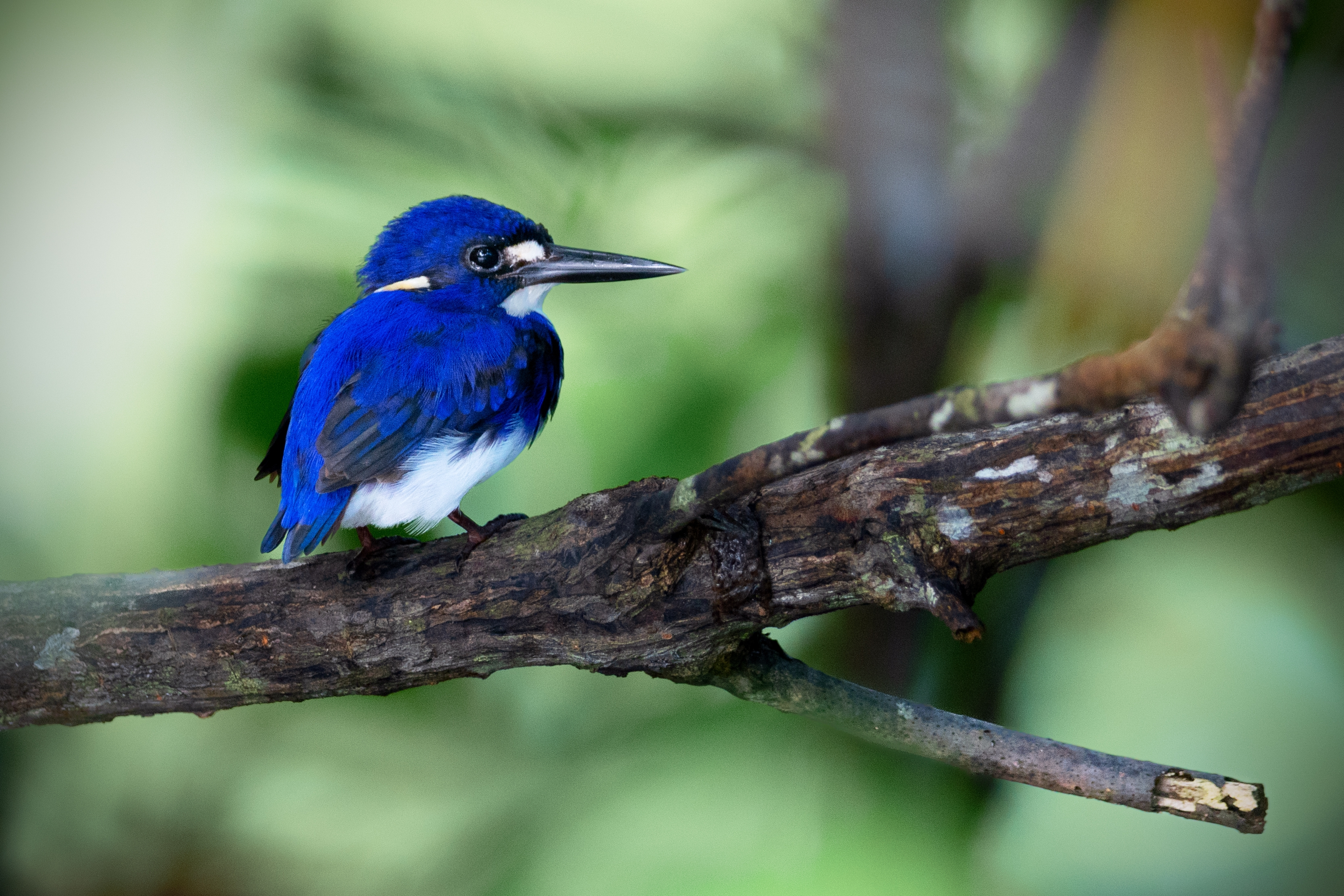

Conservation status
- Least Concern (IUCN 3.1)

Scientific classification
- Kingdom: Animalia
- Phylum: Chordata
- Class: Aves
- Order: Coraciiformes
- Family: Alcedinidae
- Subfamily: Alcedininae
- Genus: Ceyx
- Species: C. pusillus

Binomial name
- Ceyx pusillus Temminck, 1836

Subspecies
- C. p. halmaherae Salomonsen, 1934; C. p. pusillus Temminck, 1836; C. p. laetior Rand, 1941; C. p. masauji Mathews, 1941; C. p. bougainvillei Ogilvie-Grant, 1914; C. p. richardsi Tristam, 1882; C. p. aolae Ogilvie-Grant, 1914; C. p. ramsayi North, 1912; C. p. halli Mathews, 1912

Synonyms
- Alcedo pusilla

= Little kingfisher =

Species of bird

The little kingfisher (Ceyx pusillus) is a species of kingfisher in the subfamily Alcedininae.

== Taxonomy ==
The first formal description of the little kingfisher was by the Dutch zoologist Coenraad Jacob Temminck in 1836 under the current binomial name Ceyx pusilla. The generic name Ceyx (/ˈsiːɪks/) derives from Ancient Greek: Κήϋξ, romanized: Kēüx, a mythological seabird that was drowned at sea and then found washed ashore by his wife Alcyone, after which both were metamorphosed into kingfishers. The specific epithet pusillus is the Latin for 'tiny' or 'very small'.

There are nine recognised subspecies of the little kingfisher (see box at right). The nominate subspecies Ceyx pusillus pusillus is found in Aru Island and Kai Island of Indonesia, southern New Guinea, the Torres Strait Islands, and possibly the tip of Cape York in Queensland. The subspecies C. p. ramsayi is found in coastal Northern Territory and western Cape York; it is a paler blue, with blue patches extending into the sides of the breast. Subspecies C. p. halli is found in coastal north-eastern Queensland from Endeavour River to Keppel Bay; it has small blue patches extending into the sides of the breast. The subspecies C. p. laetior is found in northern New Guinea; C. p. masauji in the Bismarck Archipelago; C. p. bougainvillei is found in the Solomon Islands and Bougainville; C. p. halmaherae is found in the northern Moluccas; C. p. richardsi is found in the western and central Solomon Islands; and C. p. aolae is found in Guadalcanal.

== Description ==
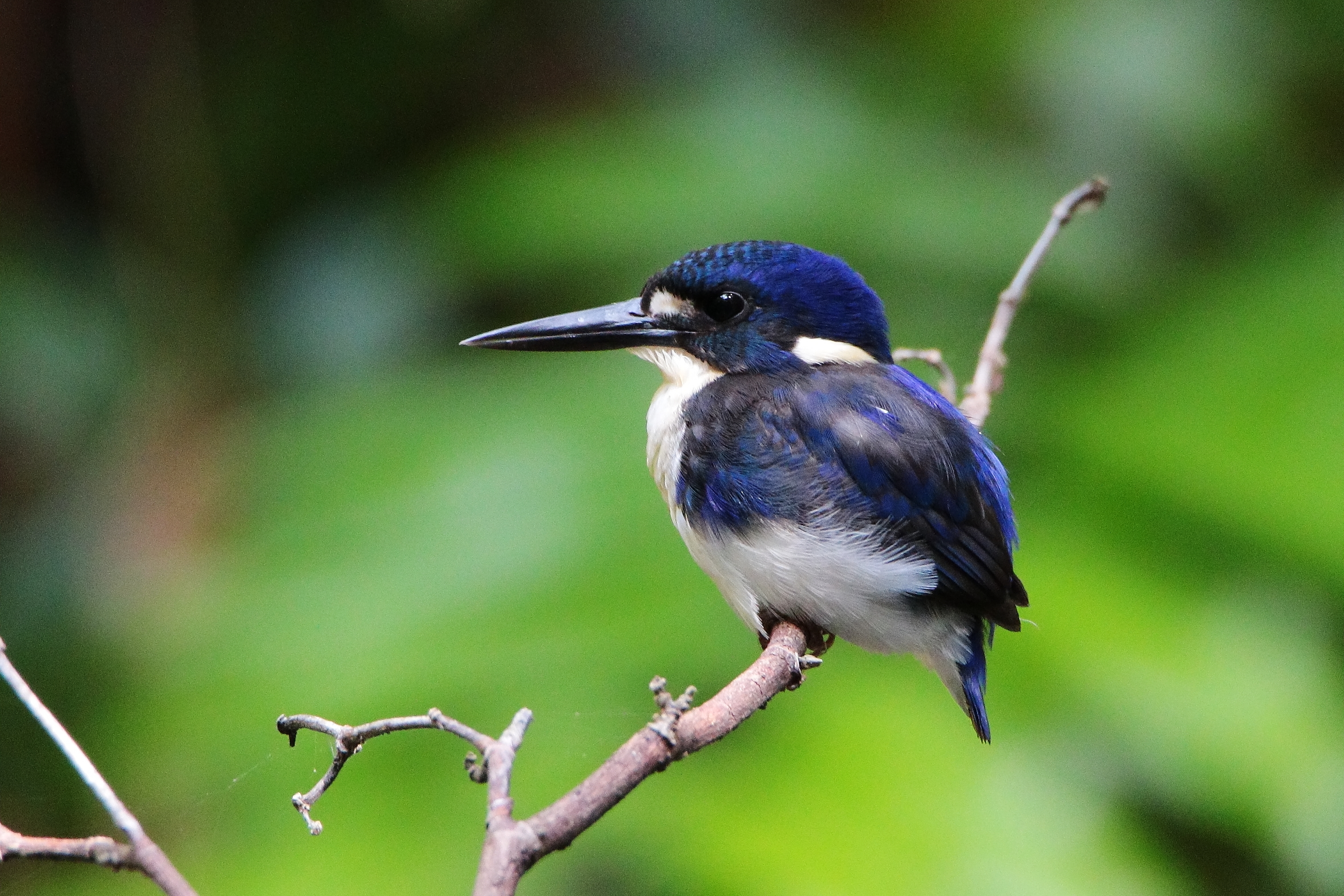
Cairns, Australia

The little kingfisher is 11.5 to 13 cm (4.5 to 5.1 in) long with a glossy, deep-blue back and head, and a snowy white breast. It has a heavy bill and a short tail. It has dark brown feet, with one toe to the rear and only two forward toes. This is one of the smallest kingfishers in the world; only the African dwarf kingfisher is smaller. The male weighs 10–15 g (0.35–0.53 oz) and the female 10–14 g (0.35–0.49 oz).

== Distribution and habitat ==
The little kingfisher is found in open forest, woodland, swamps, and mangroves of Australia (northern Queensland and coastal Northern Territory), Indonesia, Papua New Guinea, and the Solomon Islands. It is generally uncommon and sedentary.

== Behaviour ==
=== Breeding ===
The little kingfisher will make a small burrow on the bank of a river during the mating season (October to March in Queensland; February in Northern Territory; and January to April in Papua New Guinea). Sometimes the nest is formed in the rotting root of a mangrove or paperbark, or in a termite mound. A clutch of 4-5 glossy, rounded, white eggs, measuring 17 mm × 14 mm (0.67 in × 0.55 in), are laid in a chamber at the end of the burrow. Although incubation and fledging periods are unknown, both parents feed the young and continue to do so outside the nest for 9 days or more until the young are independent.

=== Feeding ===
The little kingfisher feeds on small fish, crustaceans, insect larvae and water-beetles. It perches quietly on a branch close to the water until it plunges into the water for prey, then returns swiftly and directly to the perch.

=== Voice ===
The little kingfisher makes a high-pitched, squeaky "tzeit-tzeit" in flight, which is usually not heard by observers unless very close.

== Conservation status ==
Although the population trend is decreasing, the little kingfisher is classified as least concern on the IUCN Red List. However, certain subspecies may be adversely affected by mangrove clearance and the Guadalcanal subspecies (Ceyx pusillus aolae) has not been recorded for several decades.
