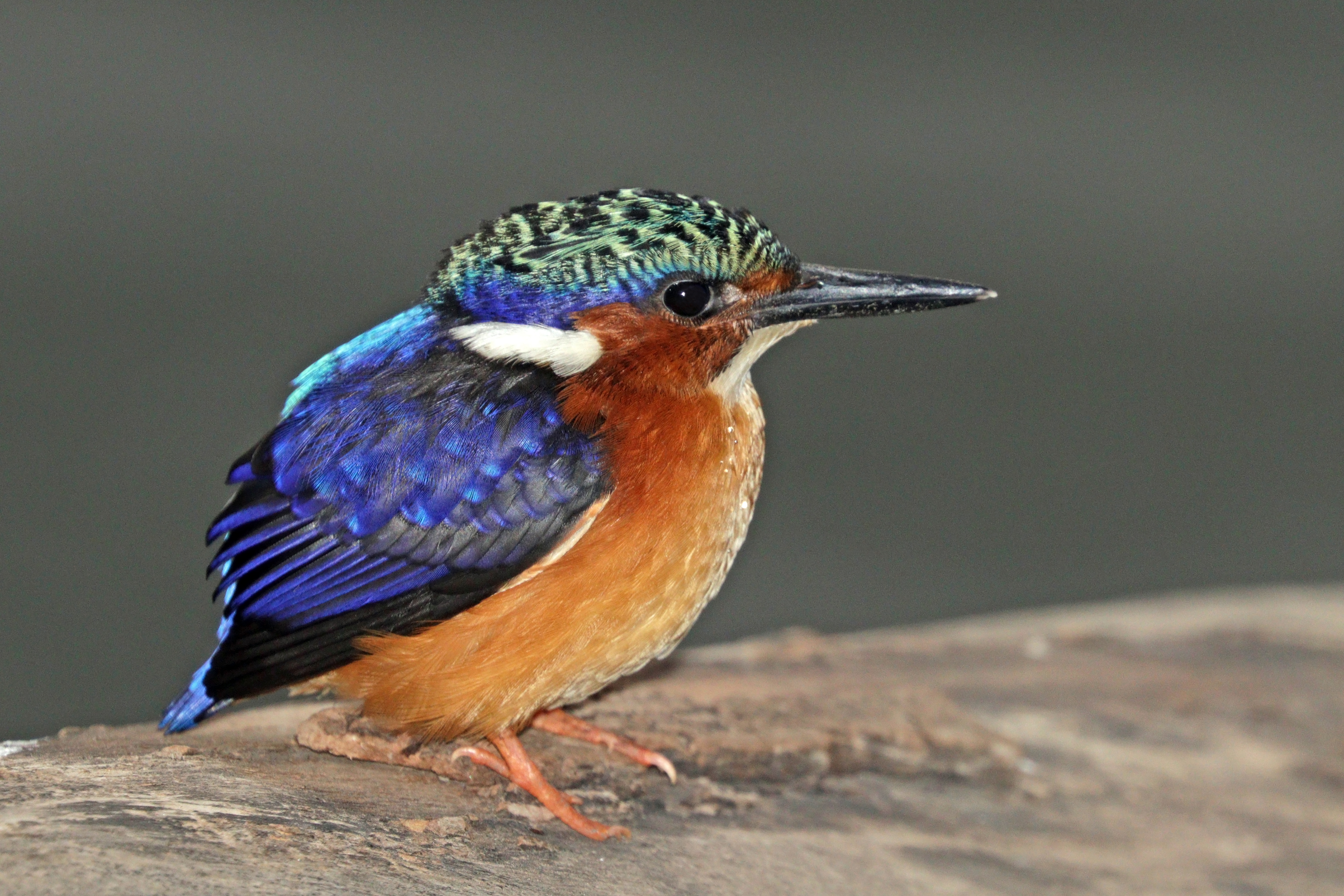
- C. v. vintsioides, Parc de Tsarasotra

Conservation status
- Least Concern (IUCN 3.1)

Scientific classification
- Kingdom: Animalia
- Phylum: Chordata
- Class: Aves
- Order: Coraciiformes
- Family: Alcedinidae
- Subfamily: Alcedininae
- Genus: Corythornis
- Species: C. vintsioides

Binomial name
- Corythornis vintsioides (Eydoux & Gervais, 1836)

Synonyms
- Alcedo vintsioides

= Malagasy kingfisher =

Species of bird

The Malagasy kingfisher or Madagascar kingfisher (Corythornis vintsioides) is a species of bird in the family Alcedinidae that is found in Madagascar, Mayotte and the Comoros. Its natural habitat is subtropical or tropical mangrove forests.

The Malagasy kingfisher was formally described by the French naturalists Joseph Eydoux and Paul Gervais in 1836 and given the binomial name Alcedo vintsioides. It is closely related to the malachite kingfisher (Corythornis cristatus) which is widely distributed in mainland Africa. It is one of only two kingfishers that occur in Madagascar. The other is the Madagascar pygmy kingfisher (Corythornis madagascariensis).

There are two subspecies:

- C. v. johannae Meinertzhagen, R., 1924 – Comoro Islands
- C. v. vintsioides (Eydoux & Gervais, 1836) – Madagascar

The Malagasy kingfisher is 13 cm (5.1 in) in length with a weight of 16.5 to 22 g (0.58 to 0.78 oz). It has dark blue upperparts, rufous underparts and a crested blue-and-green-barred crown. The bill is black. The sexes are alike. The blue plumage of the race C. v. johannae is paler and greener than that of the nominate.

== Gallery ==
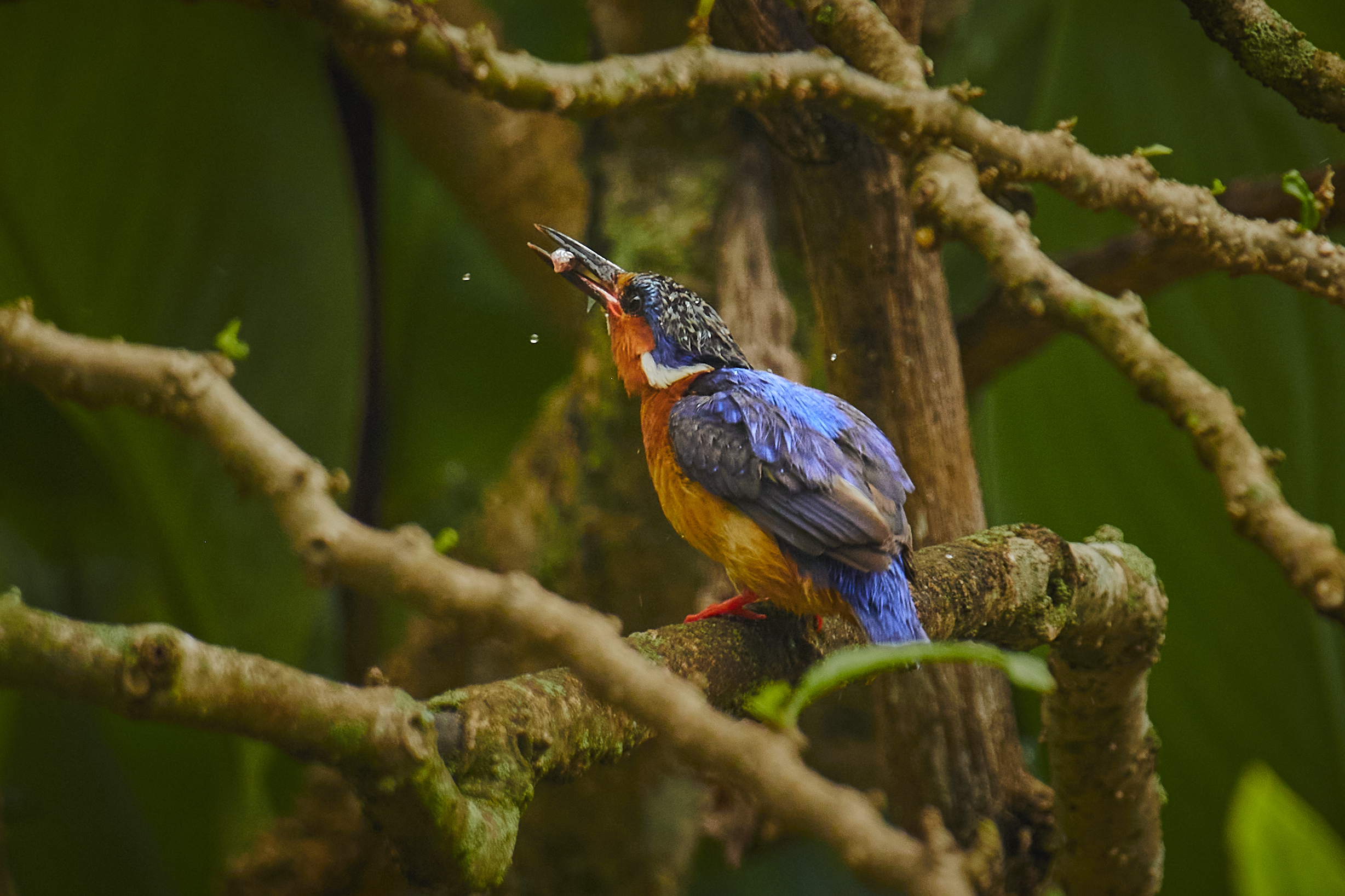

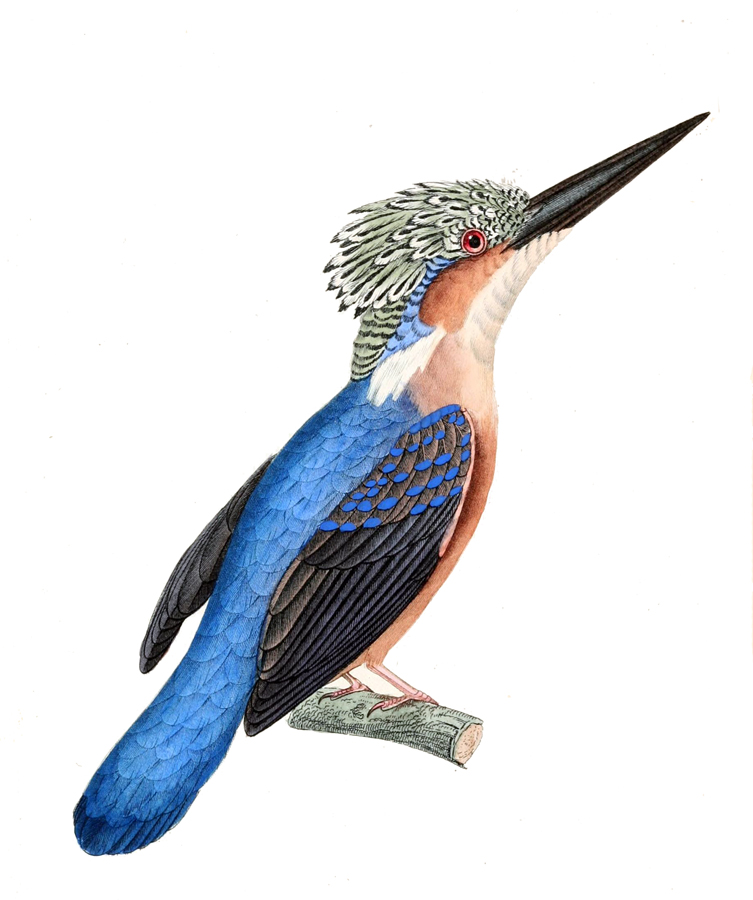

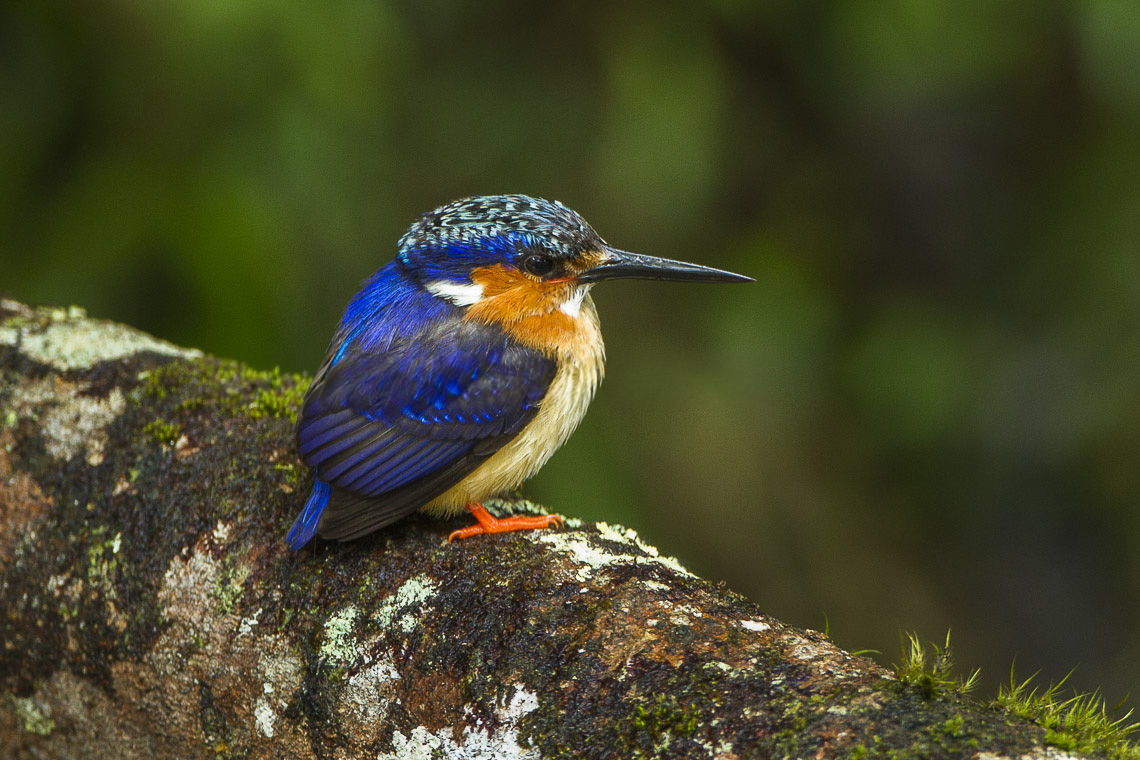

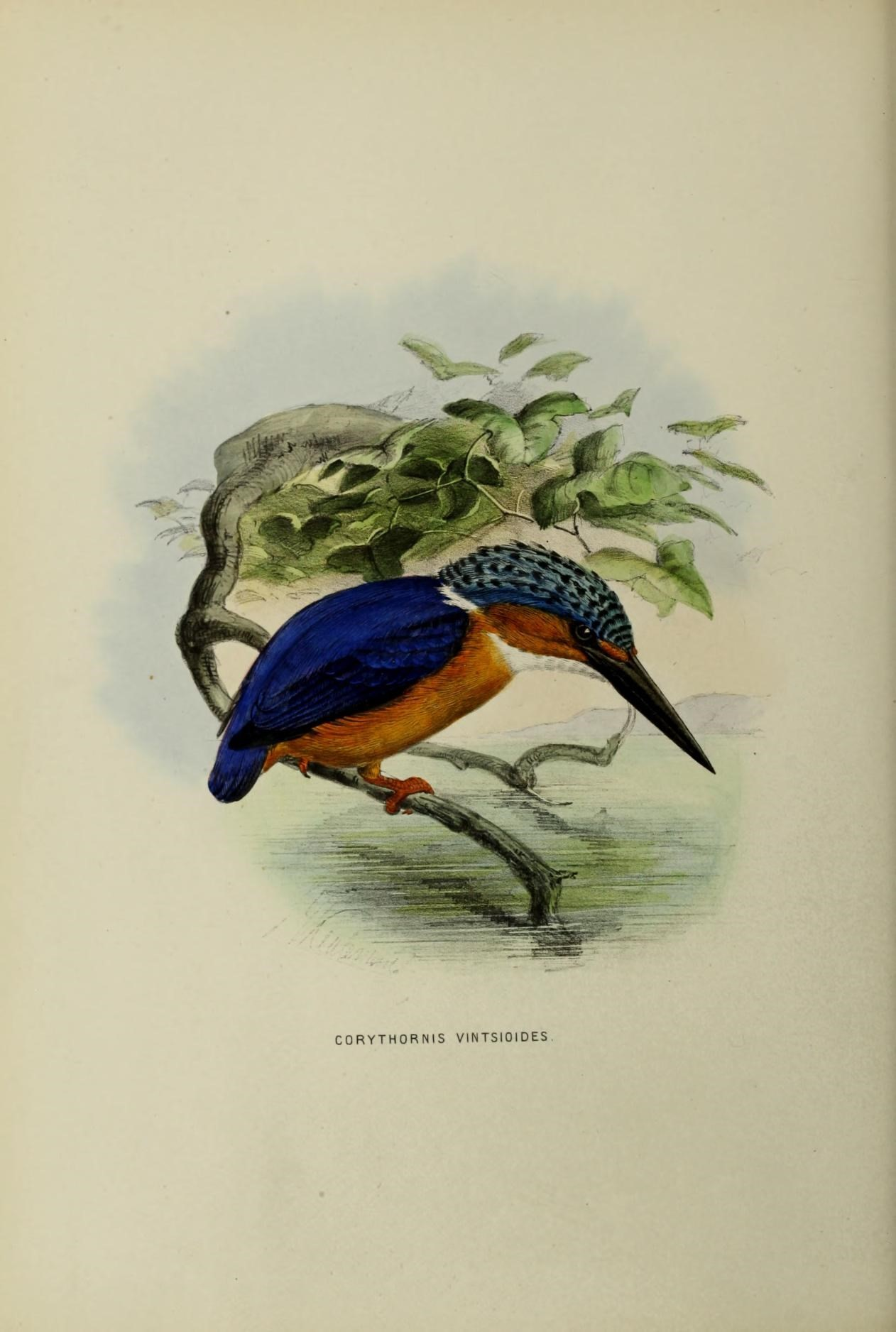

== See also ==
- Madagascar pygmy kingfisher
- List of birds of Madagascar
