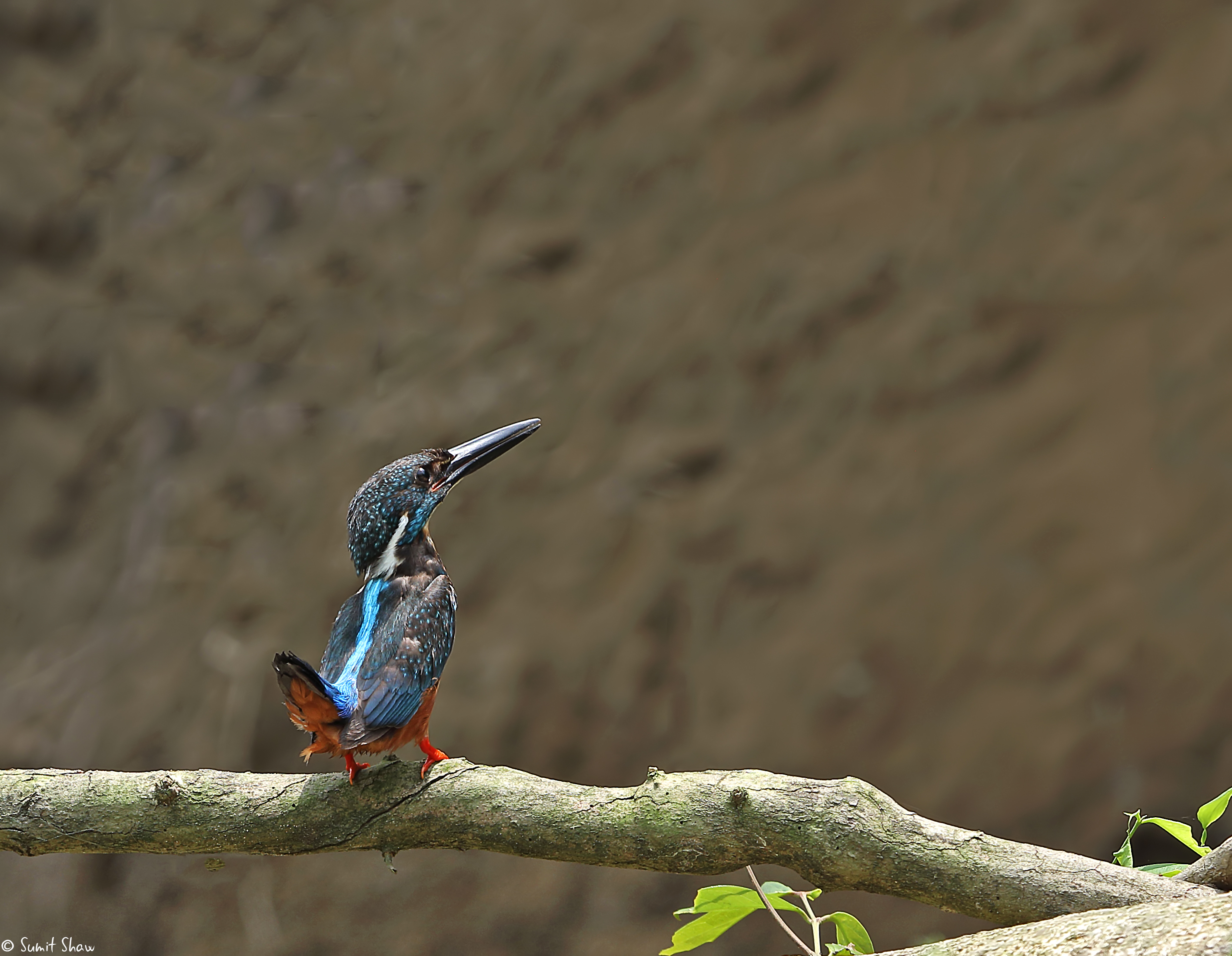

Conservation status
- Near Threatened (IUCN 3.1)

Scientific classification
- Kingdom: Animalia
- Phylum: Chordata
- Class: Aves
- Order: Coraciiformes
- Family: Alcedinidae
- Subfamily: Alcedininae
- Genus: Alcedo
- Species: A. hercules

Binomial name
- Alcedo hercules Laubmann, 1917

= Blyth's kingfisher =

Species of bird

Blyth's kingfisher (Alcedo hercules) is the largest kingfisher in the genus Alcedo. Named for Edward Blyth, the species has also been known as Alcedo grandis and as the great blue kingfisher. Between 22 and 23 cm (8 5/8 and 9 in) long, the kingfisher has deep rufous underparts with a blackish blue breast patch, and brilliant cobalt blue or azure upperparts, tinged with purple. The wings are a dark blackish green, with blue speckles and tips to some of the feathers. The bill of the male is entirely black, while the female has a dark red lower mandible. The species is distinguished from the similar blue-eared kingfisher (Alcedo meninting) and common kingfisher (Alcedo atthis) by its greater size, heavy black bill, and dark lores.

The species breeds between the months of March and June. It builds nests at the end of tunnels dug in the banks of streams or ravines. Four to six eggs are laid, with both sexes incubating. A shy bird, it frequents small waterways, feeding on fish and insects caught by diving from a shrub close to the water. It is found along streams in evergreen forest and adjacent open country between 200 and 1,200 m (660 and 3,900 ft), mainly between 400 and 1,000 m (1,300 and 3,300 ft). The species ranges from Nepal through India, Bangladesh, Bhutan, China, Myanmar, Thailand, Laos, and Vietnam. Even within its preferred habitat the density of the species is low, and the population, though not thoroughly surveyed, is believed to be small, and declining further. The International Union for Conservation of Nature classifies it as "near threatened".

== Taxonomy ==
Blyth's kingfisher was described by the English zoologist and curator at the Asiatic Society of Bengal Edward Blyth in 1845 and given the binomial name Alcedo grandis. Unfortunately, this name was preoccupied as it had already been introduced for another species by the German naturalist Johann Friedrich Gmelin in his Systema naturae of 1788. In 1917, the German naturalist Alfred Laubmann proposed the substitute binomial name Alcedo hercules to replace the preoccupied name. Blyth's kingfisher is most closely related to the blue-eared kingfisher (Alcedo meninting). The species is monotypic. It has also been referred to as the great blue kingfisher.

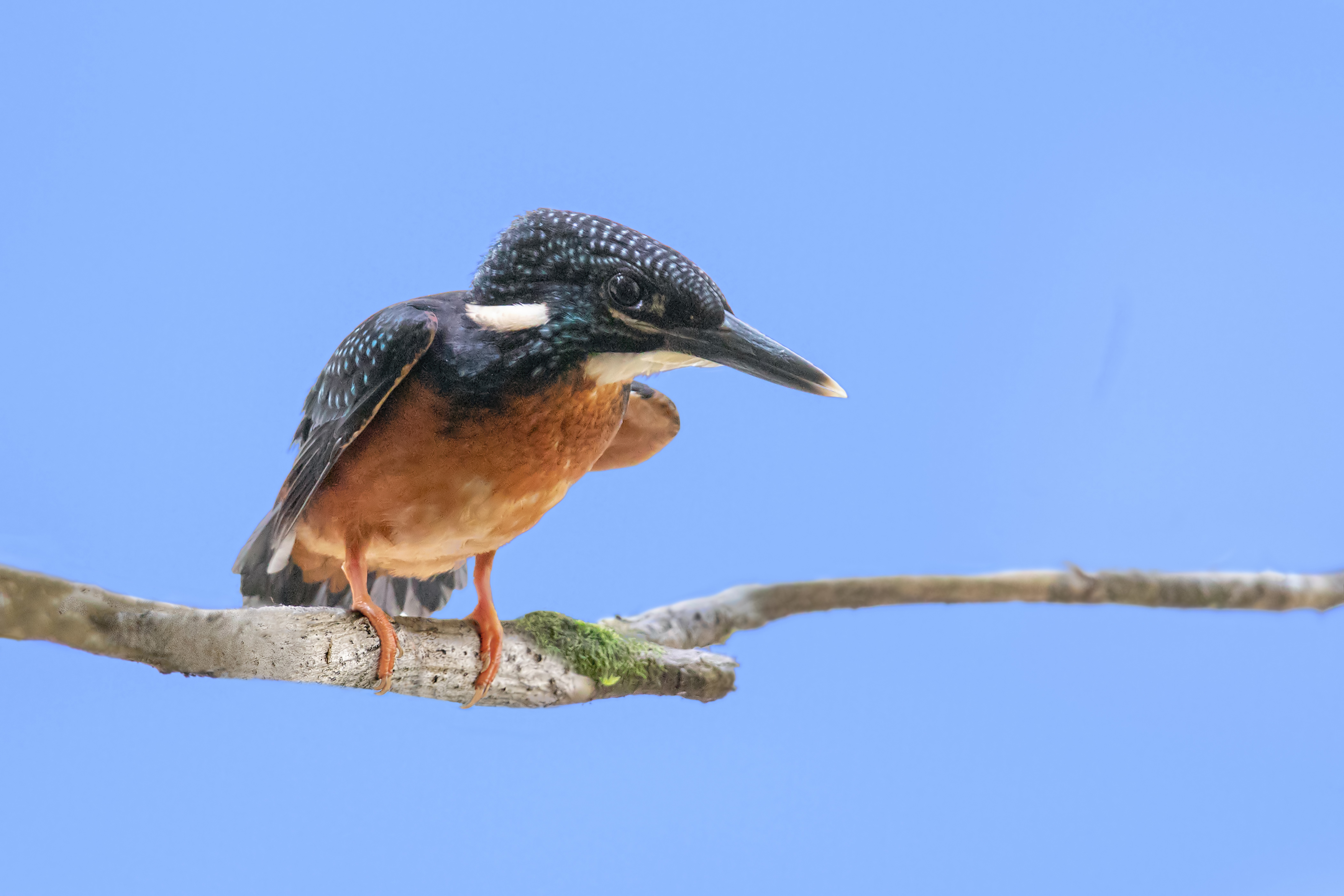

== Description ==
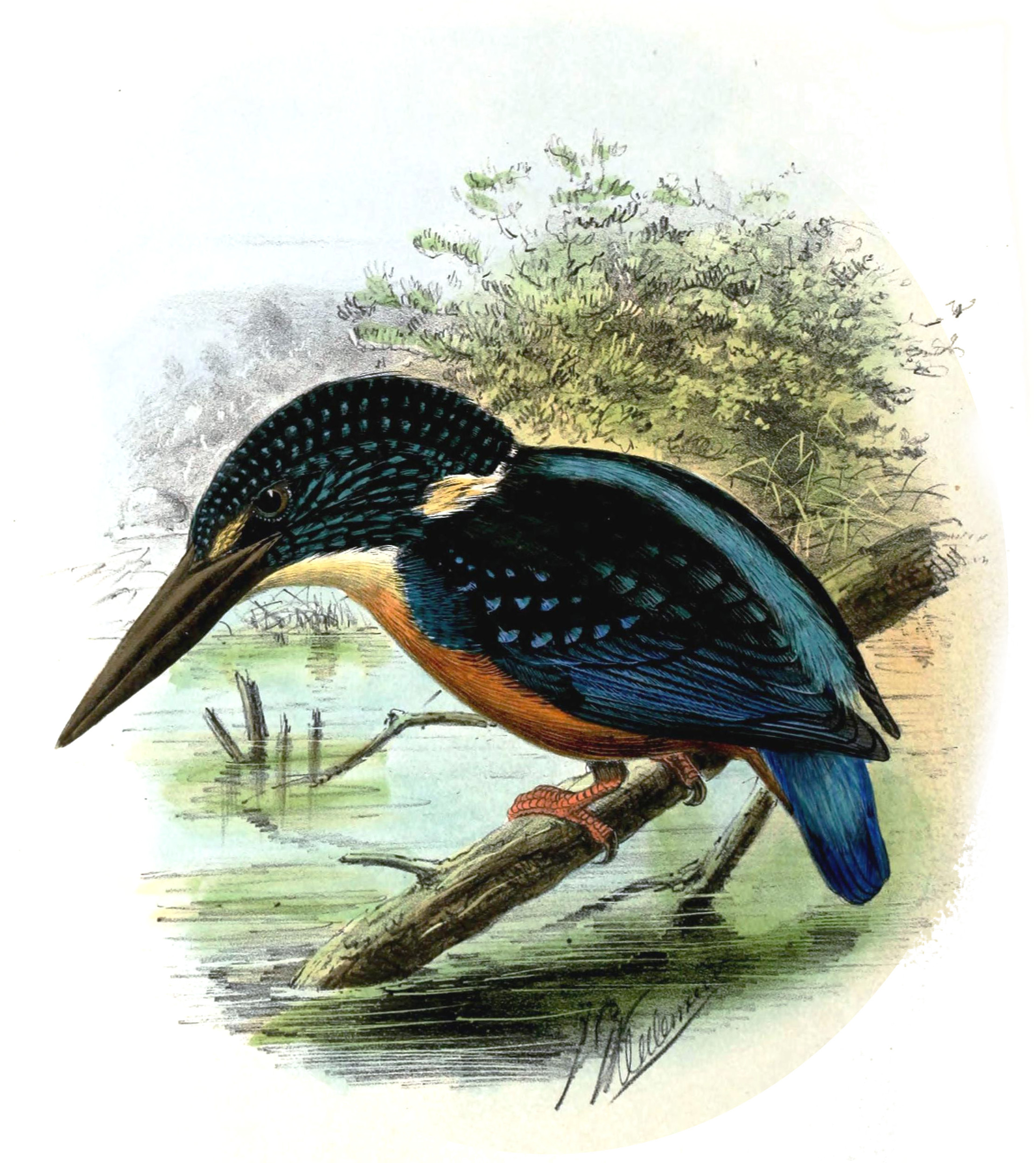
An image created between 1868 and 1871

Blyth's kingfisher is between 22 and 23 cm (8 5/8 and 9 in) in length, making it the largest of the Alcedo kingfishers. The wing of the male is between 9.6 and 10.2 cm (3 3/4 and 4 in) long, and that of the female between 9.5 and 10.3 cm (3 3/4 and 4 in). On the male, the feathering on the head is black, with shiny tips of bright blue. It has a neck patch that is whitish or buff in colour, as is the chin. The breast and belly are rufous, except for a dark blackish-blue patch on the breast. The legs and feet of the bird are also red. The bill is entirely black in the male, while the female has a red base to the mandible. The iris of the bird is reddish brown. The lores of the bird are black, and have a buff coloured streak above them. The back of the bird from mantle to the tail coverts is a bright cobalt blue or azure, with a tinge of purple towards the rump and the tail coverts. When the bird is at rest, the upper parts may appear brownish black. The tail itself is a darker ultramarine blue. The wings and the scapular feathers are a dark greenish black. The feathers of the upperwing coverts have cobalt-blue tips, while the underwing coverts are dark rufous-red. The lesser and median coverts have prominent speckles of cobalt. Any distinctive features in the plumage of the juvenile are not known.

The species is morphologically similar to the blue-eared kingfisher (Alcedo meninting), but in comparison is substantially larger. Its bill is heavier and longer than that of the blue-eared kingfisher, and is entirely black. Its crown and wings are less brilliant as those of the smaller bird, and it may be distinguished by the speckles of light blue on its crown and wing coverts. The dark ear coverts set it apart from the common kingfisher (Alcedo atthis), which has rufous ear-coverts. It is similar to the female blue-banded kingfisher (Alcedo euryzona), but the two species do not overlap in their range.

The call of the species is described as a loud "pseet", less shrill but louder and more hoarse than that of the common kingfisher, and similar but louder to that of the blue-eared kingfisher. One of the calls made by the slaty-backed forktail (Enicurus schistaceus) is sometimes mistaken for the call of Blyth's kingfisher.

== Behaviour and ecology ==
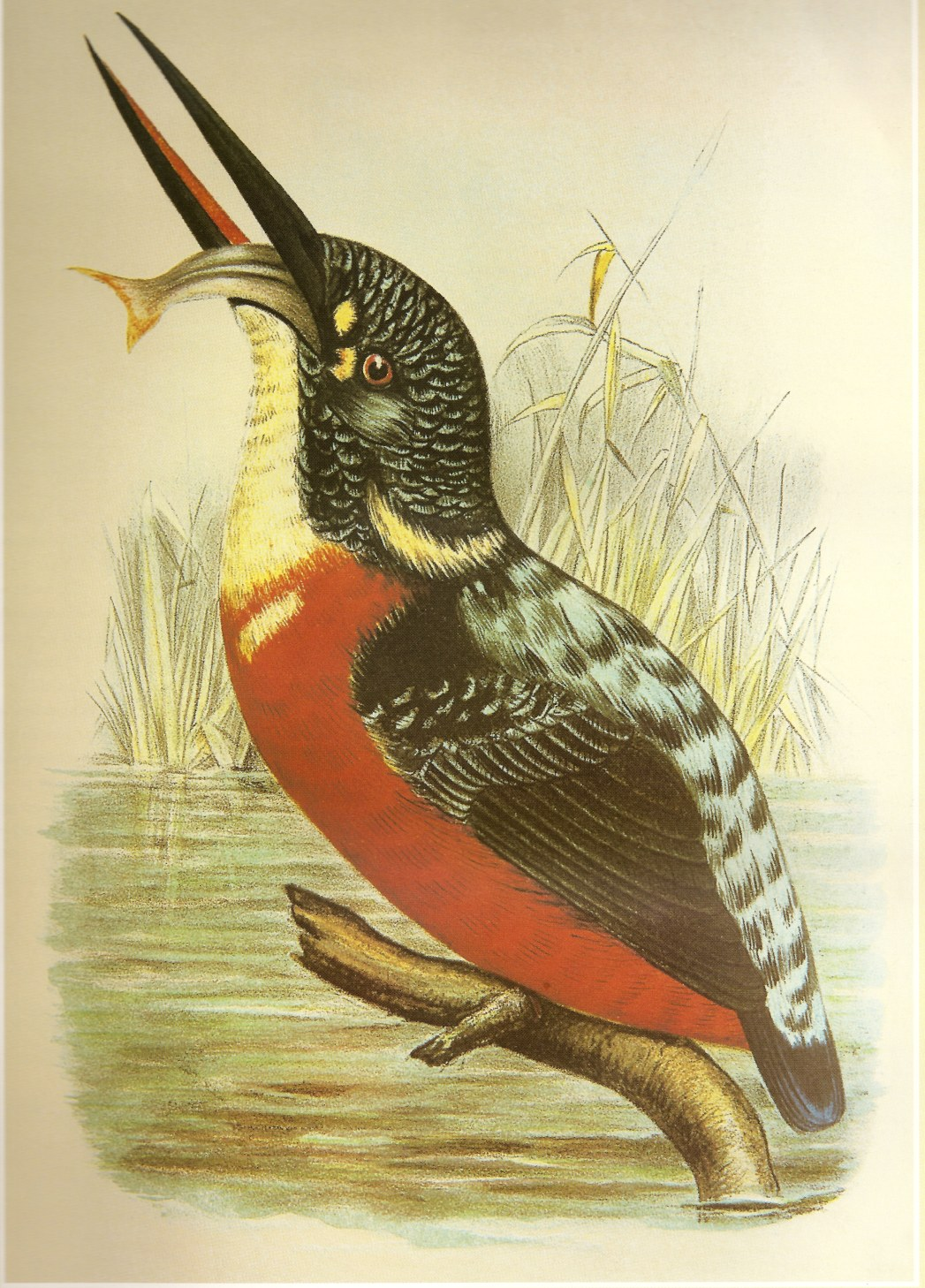
Blyth's kingfisher feeding, painted in 1897

The breeding period of Blyth's kingfisher is chiefly between April and May, extending to March and June. The nests are built at the end of a tunnel in a muddy bank, next to either a stream or a ravine in the forest. The tunnel extends straight, then rises, before descending to the chamber in which the nest is. This chamber is between 15 and 20 cm (6 and 8 in) wide and 10 and 13 cm (4 and 5 in) high. The width of the tunnel is typically 8 cm (3 1/8 in): the length varies with the soil, ranging from 45 to 60 cm (17 1/2 to 23 1/2 in) in hard soil to 2 m (6 ft 7 in) in sandy soil. Between four and six eggs are laid, incubated by both parents. The parents sit very tight; nests become covered in faecal matter. The periods of incubation and fledging are not known.

The species feeds on fish and insects it catches by diving in water bodies. Unlike other Alcedo kingfishers, Blyth's kingfisher dives from a shrub close above the water, rather than from an exposed vantage point. The species is presumed not to migrate. It is described as a shy bird.

== Habitat and distribution ==
Blyth's kingfisher frequents small rivers and waterways in evergreen forest, hilly regions, or deep ravines. It is sometimes found near streams near well-wooded farmland. Its elevational range is chiefly between 400 and 1,000 m (1,300 and 3,300 ft) above sea level, extending to a minimum of 200 m (660 ft) and a maximum of 1,200 m (3,900 ft).

The density of the species is low across its range. In China, it is known to be found in the Mengyang Nature Reserve in Yunnan, and in the Nonggang National Nature Reserve and Diding Nature Reserve in Guangxi province. It is also known to be present in Hainan. In Vietnam the species is found in Annam and western Tonkin, in which regions it is fairly common. In northern Laos and the Annamite mountains, it may be locally common. It is also found in Myanmar, where its density varies considerably, and is either a visitor or a rare resident in northwestern Thailand. It is rare in Bhutan in northeastern India, and a vagrant in Bangladesh and eastern Nepal. Its range in northeast India includes the eastern Himalayas, up to 1,200 m (3,900 ft).

== Status and conservation ==
The population of Blyth's kingfisher has not been quantified globally. In China, the species is estimated to have fewer than 100 breeding pairs. The species occurs at a low density even within a favorable habitat. The habitats it favors are being degraded and fragmented by human activity. Other potential threats to the species include water pollution in the rivers it inhabits and anthropogenic disturbance such as deforestation. No specific conservation actions are known to have been taken to protect the species. Due to the presence of human disturbance, its population is thought to be in slow decline. The International Union for Conservation of Nature categorizes the species as "near threatened"; it has previously classified the species as "vulnerable."
