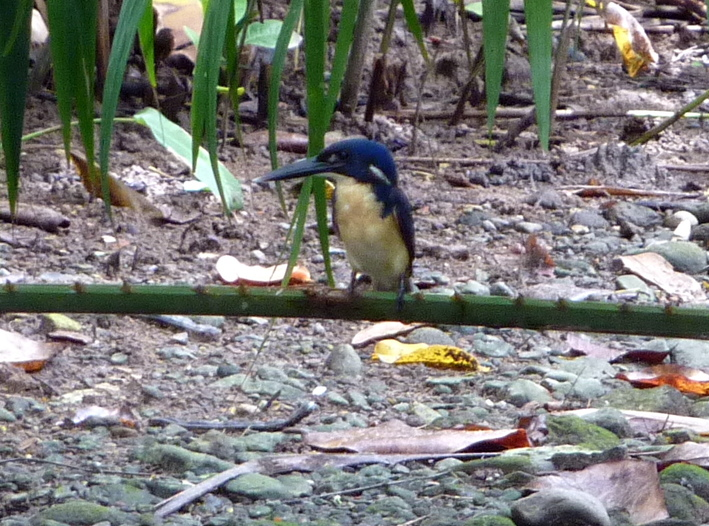

Conservation status
- Vulnerable (IUCN 3.1)

Scientific classification
- Kingdom: Animalia
- Phylum: Chordata
- Class: Aves
- Order: Coraciiformes
- Family: Alcedinidae
- Subfamily: Alcedininae
- Genus: Ceyx
- Species: C. websteri

Binomial name
- Ceyx websteri (Hartert, 1898)

Synonyms
- Alcedo websteri

= Bismarck kingfisher =

Species of bird

The Bismarck kingfisher (Ceyx websteri) is a species of bird in the family Alcedinidae. It is endemic to Papua New Guinea.

Its natural habitats are subtropical or tropical moist lowland forests, rivers, freshwater lakes, and freshwater marshes. It is threatened by habitat loss.
