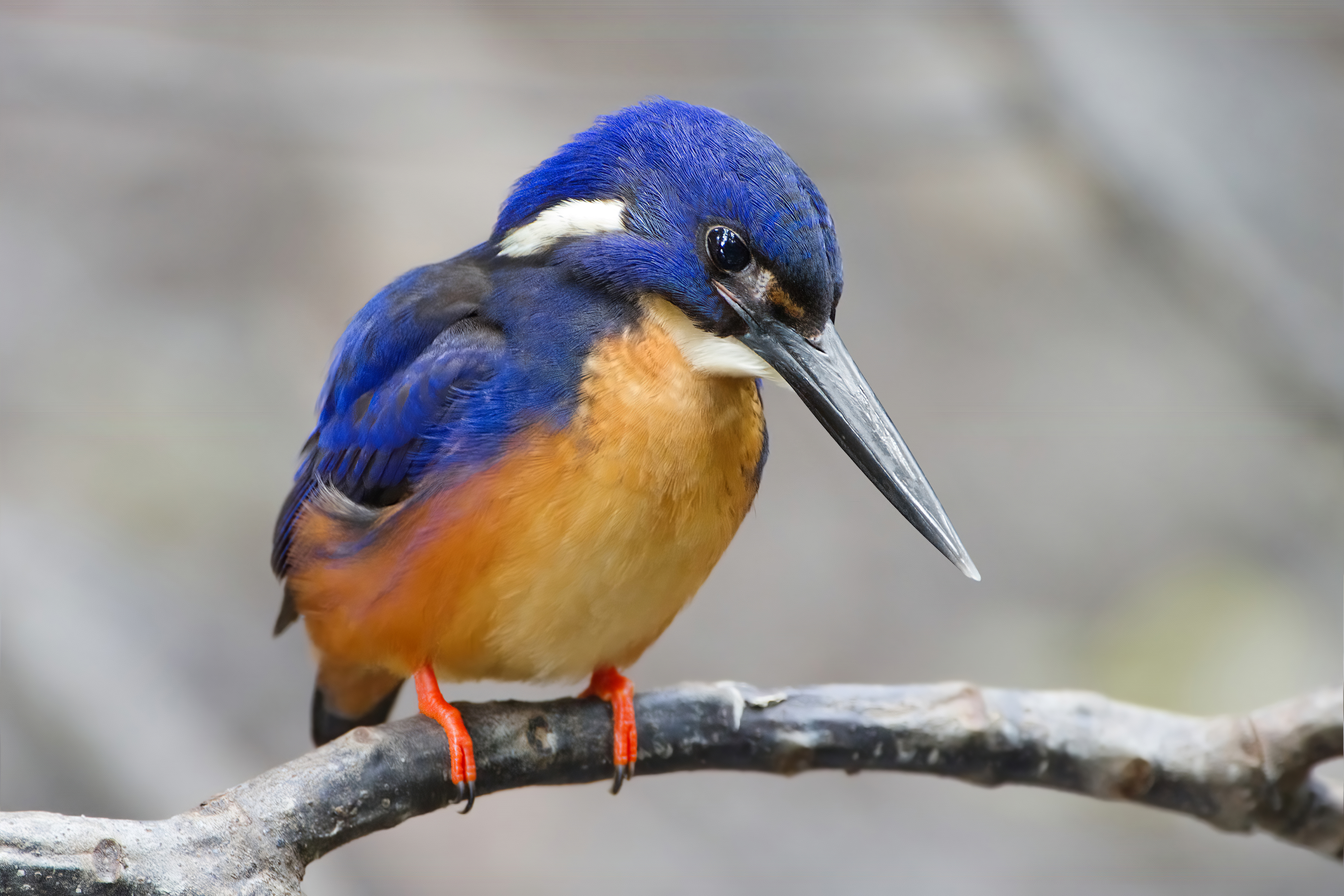
- A. a. ruficollaris

Conservation status
- Least Concern (IUCN 3.1)

Scientific classification
- Kingdom: Animalia
- Phylum: Chordata
- Class: Aves
- Order: Coraciiformes
- Family: Alcedinidae
- Subfamily: Alcedininae
- Genus: Ceyx
- Species: C. azureus

Binomial name
- Ceyx azureus (Latham, 1802)

Subspecies
- C. a. azureus Latham, 1801 Eastern and southeastern Australian population; C. a. ruficollaris (Bankier, 1841) Northern Australian population; C. a. diemenensis (Gould, 1846) Tasmanian population; C. a. lessonii (Cassin, 1850) Southern New Guinea population; C. a. affinis (G.R. Gray, 1860) North Maluku population; C. a. yamdenae (Rothschild, 1901) South Banda Sea population; C. a. ochrogaster (Reichenow, 1903) Northern New Guinea population

Synonyms
- Alcedo azurea

= Azure kingfisher =

Species of bird

The azure kingfisher (Ceyx azureus) is a small kingfisher in the river kingfisher subfamily, Alcedininae.

== Description ==
The azure kingfisher measures 17–19 cm (6.7–7.5 in) in length, and the male weighs 29–32 g (1.0–1.1 oz) while the female is slightly heavier at 31–35 g (1.1–1.2 oz). It is a very colourful bird, with deep blue to azure back, a large white to buff spot on the side of the neck and throat, rufous-buff with some blue-violet streaks on the breast and flanks. The feet are red with only two forward toes. The lores (the region between the eye and the bill) are white and inconspicuous except in front view, where they stand out as two large white eye-like spots which may have a role in warding off potential predators.

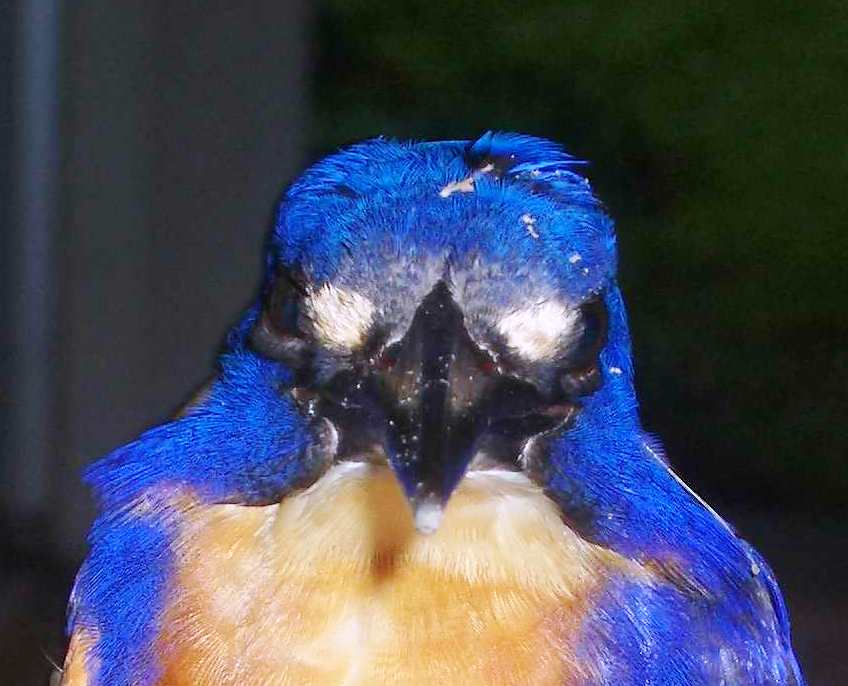
Azure kingfisher showing large white eye-like lores

== Taxonomy ==
The subspecies (see box at right) differ only in minor details: compared with the nominate subspecies Ceyx azureus azureus, C. a. ruficollaris is smaller, brighter, and has more blue on the flanks; C. a. diemenensis is rather large, short-billed, and has a distinctly darker crown; C. a. lessoni is more contrasting, with little blue on the flanks; C.a. affinis has a red billtip, as has the smaller C.a. yamdenae; and C. a. ochrogaster is very pale below. Still, there is very little intergradation in the areas where subspecies meet. Comparing subspecific variation with climate data, the former's pattern does not follow and in some instances runs contrary to Bergmann's Rule and Gloger's Rule.

The generic name Ceyx (/ˈsiːɪks/) derives from Ancient Greek: Κήϋξ, romanized: Kēüx, a mythological seabird that was drowned at sea and then found washed ashore by his wife Alcyone, after which both were metamorphosed into kingfishers. The specific epithet is Mediaeval Latin azureus, 'azure'.

== Distribution and habitat ==
The azure kingfisher is found in northern and eastern Australia and Tasmania, as well as the lowlands of New Guinea and neighbouring islands, and out to North Maluku and Romang. The contact zone between the mainland Australian subspecies is along the east coast of Far North Queensland, between Cairns and Princess Charlotte Bay, and that of the New Guinea ones between Simbu Province and the northern Huon Peninsula, as well as south of Cenderawasih Bay.

The habitat of the azure kingfisher includes the banks of vegetated creeks, lakes, swamps, tidal estuaries, and mangroves.

It is common in the north of its range, tending to uncommon in the south. It is generally sedentary, although some seasonal migration may occur.

== Behaviour ==
=== Feeding ===
The azure kingfisher feeds on small fish, crustaceans (such as shrimps, amphipods and freshwater yabbies), water beetles, spiders, locusts, and small frogs or tadpoles. It is often difficult to see until it quickly darts from a perch above water.

=== Breeding ===
The breeding season of the azure kingfisher is from September to April in northern Australia and from August to February in southern Australia, sometimes with two broods. The nest is in a chamber at the end of a 1 m (3 ft 3 in) long burrow in an earthen creek bank. A clutch of 4–6 white, rounded, glossy eggs, measuring 22 mm × 19 mm (0.87 in × 0.75 in), is laid. Both parents incubate the eggs for 20–22 days, and then feed the hatchlings for a further 3 to 5 weeks. The nests are occasionally destroyed by floods and their contents may be taken by brown snakes.

=== Voice ===
The azure kingfisher is usually silent, but makes a sharp, squeaky call when breeding. Its voice is a high-pitched, shrill "pseet-pseet", often in flight.

== Conservation status ==
Although the population of azure kingfishers is decreasing, their wide distribution enables classification as a species of least concern on the IUCN Red List.
