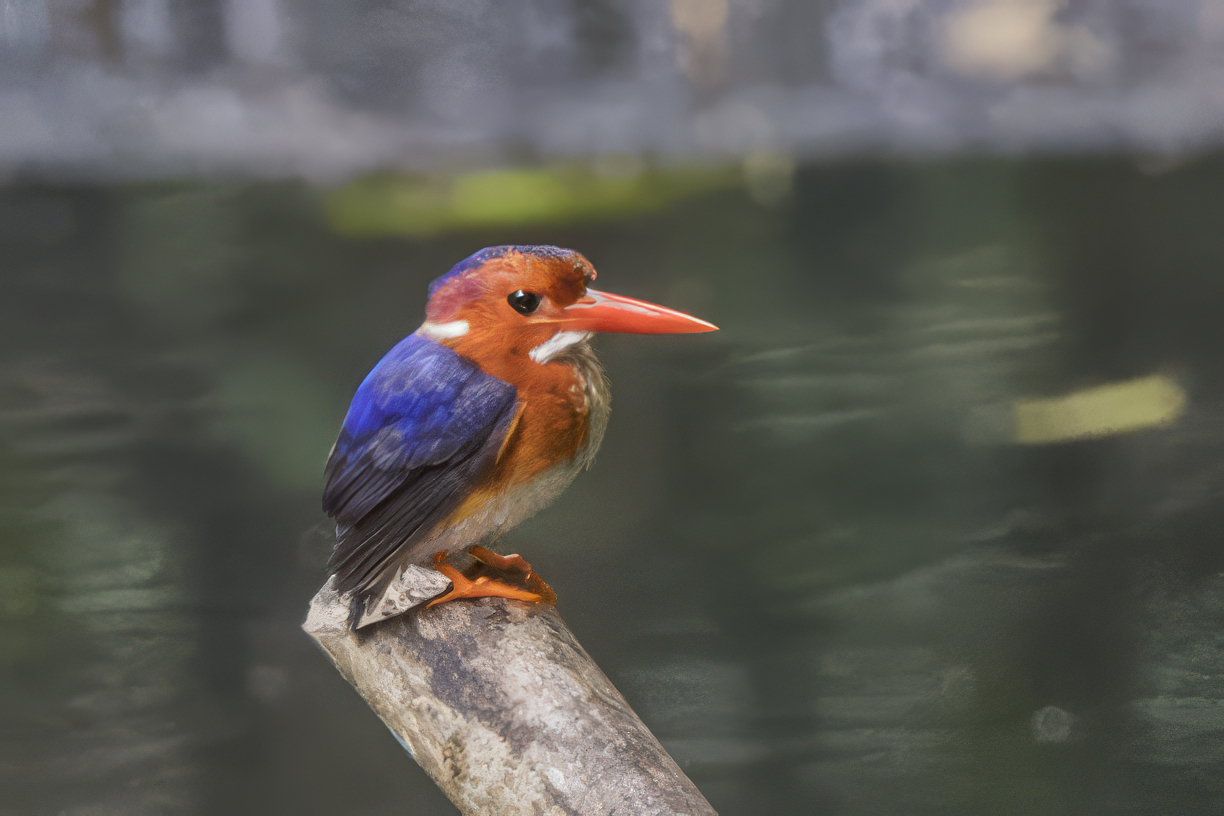
- Corythornis leucogaster bowdleri, Ghana

Conservation status
- Least Concern (IUCN 3.1)]

Scientific classification
- Kingdom: Animalia
- Phylum: Chordata
- Class: Aves
- Order: Coraciiformes
- Family: Alcedinidae
- Subfamily: Alcedininae
- Genus: Corythornis
- Species: C. leucogaster

Binomial name
- Corythornis leucogaster (Fraser, 1843)

Synonyms
- Alcedo leucogaster

= White-bellied kingfisher =

Species of bird

The white-bellied kingfisher (Corythornis leucogaster) is a species of kingfisher in the subfamily Alcedininae that occurs in Mali and throughout the African tropical rainforest. The first formal description of the species was by the British zoologist Louis Fraser in 1843 under the binomial name Halcyon leucogaster.

There are three subspecies:

- Corythornis leucogaster bowdleri (Neumann, 1908) – far north-eastern Guinea, Mali and Upper Guinean forests
- Corythornis leucogaster leucogaster (Fraser, 1843) – Nigeria to north west Angola, Bioko Island
- Corythornis leucogaster leopoldi (Dubois, AJC, 1905) – east Congo to south Uganda and northwest Zambia

The white-bellied kingfisher is 13 cm (5.1 in) in length with a weight of around 14.5 g (0.51 oz). It has ultramarine upperparts and a red bill. The underparts are rufous-chestnut apart from a central white band. The sexes are alike.
