= Malaysian blue-banded kingfisher =

Conservation status
- Near Threatened (IUCN 3.1)

Scientific classification
- Kingdom: Animalia
- Phylum: Chordata
- Class: Aves
- Order: Coraciiformes
- Family: Alcedinidae
- Subfamily: Alcedininae
- Genus: Alcedo
- Species: A. peninsulae

Binomial name
- Alcedo peninsulae Laubmann, 1941

Species of bird

The Malaysian (or Malayan) blue-banded kingfisher (Alcedo peninsulae) is a species of kingfisher in the subfamily, Alcedininae. Its natural habitats are subtropical or tropical moist lowland forests, subtropical or tropical mangrove forests, and rivers. It is found in Myanmar, the Malay Peninsula, Sumatra, and Borneo.

== Description ==
It is a small-sized bird at 20 cm on average, but comparatively larger than other species of the kingfisher in similar regions, with a relatively long bill and a short tail. The bird is 17–20.5 cm in length with the bill measuring 45.0–50.8 mm and the tarsus 11.9–13.7 mm.

=== Plumage ===
Adults of this species can be identified by their white throat and a white patch on the neck that connects to a narrow collar of reddish-brown feathers at the back. Their crown, wings, and upper tail feathers are bluish-black and often have small speckles of bright blue or a light brownish yellow on the crown and shoulder feathers. The tail is 35–40 mm, and the wings are 79–92 mm. The back feathers are silvery-blue, which stands out from the rest of their upper body. The juvenile plumage of the Malaysian Blue-banded Kingfisher is similar to the adult, but duller in color.

=== Sexual dimorphism ===
This species shows sexual dimorphism, with males having a variable broad blue band across their chest on a white underbelly, whereas females have dull reddish-brown underparts and lack the distinctive breast band of the males. Both typically have a brighter blue patch of feathers on their cheeks compared to the crown, however, females may have some reddish feathers mixed in. Additionally, females tend to have more extensive reddish areas around their eyes and a less vibrant, more brownish hue to their wings and head feathers.

=== Similar species ===
The female shares the traits of reddish-brown underparts and a bright white neck mark with the smaller and more brightly-colored common kingfisher (Alcedo atthis) and the blue-eared kingfisher (Alcedo meninting). The Malaysian blue-banded kingfisher, however, has much more contrast than those two species, with a bright pale blue back against its darker upperparts.

== Distribution and habitat ==
This bird is mainly found in Peninsular Malaysia and Borneo, specifically the Greater Sundas area. The birds may also be found in areas including Thailand, Brunei, Sumatra, and Myanmar.

This bird can be seen near water and low to ground or in swamps. Typically the bird resides near streams and rivers within the forest. The bird dwells in evergreens, back-mangroves and other local trees. While predominantly found in lowlands, sightings have been recorded at elevations of up to 900 meters in Peninsular Malaysia and 1,400 meters in Borneo.

== Behavior ==
This species is described as behaving in a shy and secretive manner. The bird is often observed moving from one perch to another. Its flight is described as quick and direct, often flying low over the water's surface. It is a primarily solitary bird but has also been observed to spend time in pairs. This bird sleeps with its head tucked in, usually on a small branch.

=== Diet ===
Its diet consists mainly of fish, which is known as a piscivore diet. This bird specifically is known to eat Rasbora fish and shrimp, but also eats crustaceans, insects, larvae, and lizards. The bird hunts for fish on rocks and low branches. It then dives into the water and swallows the animal whole.

=== Breeding ===
Breeding activities for this species typically occur between January and March, although the breeding season can extend from January to mid-August. Nests are often situated along stream banks in forests, with some instances of nest excavation into stream banks. The eggs, typically ranging from 3-5 per brood, are white in color.

== Threats ==
The population of Malaysian blue-banded kingfishers is declining due to habitat loss caused by extensive logging, uncontrolled fires, and urban and commercial development. Deforestation for oil, palm, and rubber plantations has further reduced their habitat. Additionally, parasites and diseases pose threats to their survival.

=== Diseases and parasites ===
While Malaysian blue-banded Kkngfishers are not known to harbor Haemosporidians of the genera Plasmodium and Haemoproteus, they can be infested with mites (Trombiculid mites Neoschoengastia heynemani) and lice (Mallophaga). Parasites like Proyseria and Quazithelazia rostrata, a parasitic worm found under the koilin lining of the stomach, have also been observed in both male and female Malaysian blue-banded kingfishers.

== Status and conservation ==
The Malaysian blue-banded kingfisher is classified as Near Threatened by the International Union for Conservation of Nature (IUCN), indicating that its population faces significant risks of decline and potential extinction if current trends continue.

=== Conservation ===
The primary threat to the species is due to the escalating rate of deforestation within its habitat. Research conducted by the IUCN has revealed a concerning 20–23% reduction in forested areas, directly impacting the bird's population dynamics. Given its reliance on forest ecosystems, with the consistently growing deforestation rates, it is projected that these birds' populations will decline simultaneously.

Forest fires in eastern Borneo pose a significant threat, driving out the birds from their natural habitats.

To combat these threats, Conservation efforts are being made. The species is protected by laws in Malaysia, Indonesia, and Thailand. Conservation actions include surveys and research initiatives to better understand population dynamics. Management strategies are being developed to reduce the impacts of deforestation and forest fires, while advocacy efforts argue for better protection of areas where the species lives.
