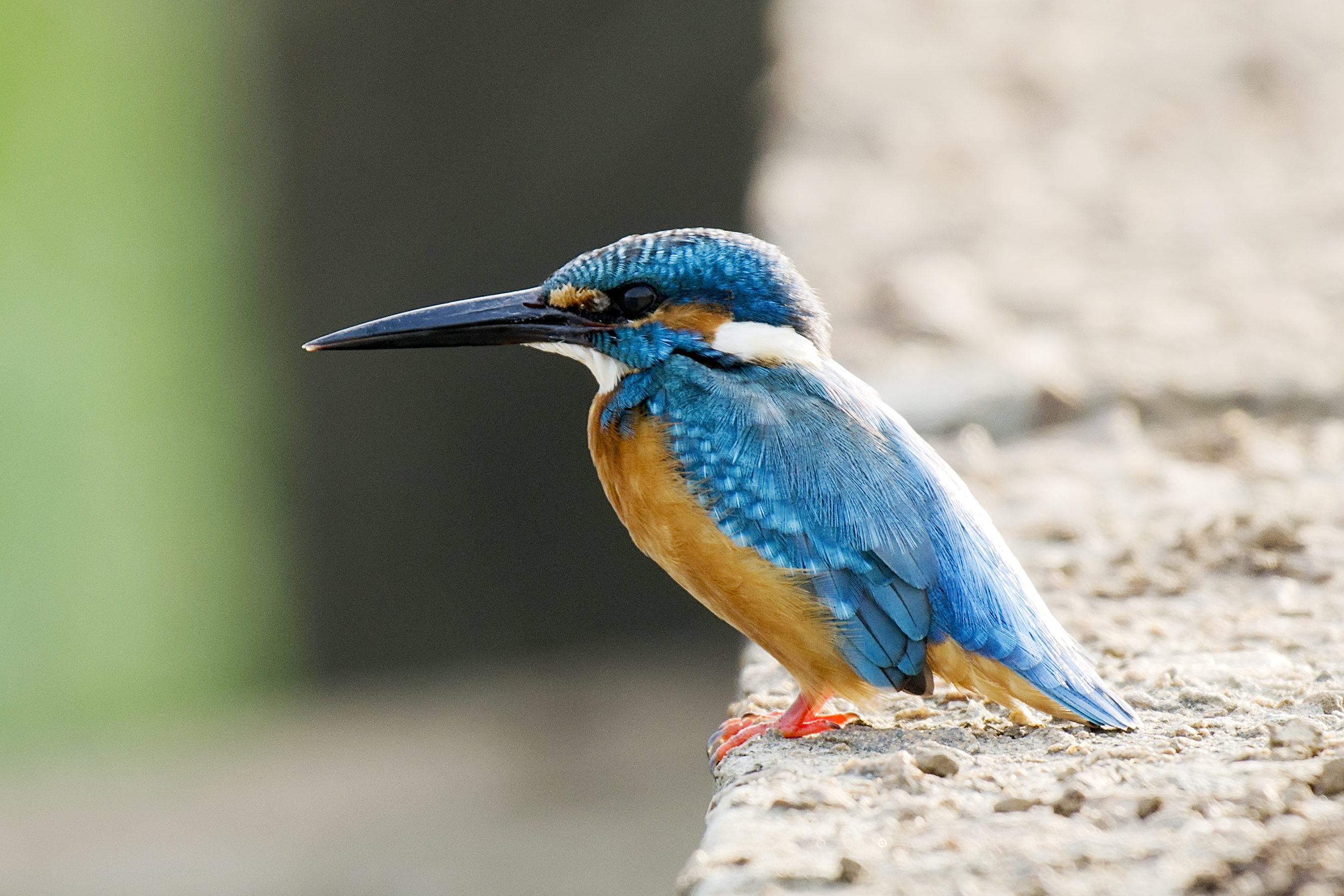
- A male common kingfisher (Alcedo atthis).

Scientific classification
- Kingdom: Animalia
- Phylum: Chordata
- Class: Aves
- Order: Coraciiformes
- Family: Alcedinidae
- Subfamily: Alcedininae; Rafinesque, 1815

Genera
- Ispidina; Corythornis; Alcedo; Ceyx

= River kingfisher =

Subfamily of birds

Phylogeny of the Alcedininae

- Alcedininae
  - - Ispidina
    - Corythornis
  - - Alcedo
    - Ceyx

Cladogram based on Andersen et al. (2017)

The river kingfishers or pygmy kingfishers, subfamily Alcedininae, are one of the three subfamilies of kingfishers. The river kingfishers are widespread through Africa and east and south Asia as far as Australia, with one species, the common kingfisher (Alcedo atthis) also appearing in Europe and northern Asia. This group includes many kingfishers that actually dive for fish. The origin of the subfamily is thought to have been in Asia.

These are brightly plumaged, compact birds with short tails, large heads, and long bills. They feed on insects or fish, and lay white eggs in a self-excavated burrow. Both adults incubate the eggs and feed the chicks.

== Taxonomy ==
A molecular phylogenetic study of the river kingfishers published in 2007 found that the genera as then defined did not form monophyletic groups. The species were subsequently rearranged into four monophyletic genera. A clade containing four species were placed in the resurrected genus Corythornis and five species (little kingfisher, azure kingfisher, Bismarck kingfisher, silvery kingfisher and indigo-banded kingfisher) were moved from Alcedo to Ceyx.

All except one of the kingfishers in the reconstituted Ceyx have three rather than the usual four toes. The exception is the Sulawesi dwarf kingfisher which retains a vestigial fourth toe.

The subfamily includes 35 species divided into four genera. The African dwarf kingfisher is sometimes placed in the monotypic genus Myioceyx, and sometimes with the pygmy kingfishers in Ispidina. Molecular analysis suggests that the Madagascar pygmy kingfisher is most closely related to the malachite kingfisher.

Species in taxonomic sequence
Genus	Common name	Binomial
Ispidina Kaup, 1848	African dwarf kingfisher	Ispidina lecontei
Ispidina Kaup, 1848	African pygmy kingfisher	Ispidina picta
Corythornis Kaup, 1848	Madagascar pygmy kingfisher	Corythornis madagascariensis
Corythornis Kaup, 1848	White-bellied kingfisher	Corythornis leucogaster
Corythornis Kaup, 1848	Malachite kingfisher	Corythornis cristatus
Corythornis Kaup, 1848	Malagasy kingfisher	Corythornis vintsioides
Alcedo Linnaeus, 1758	Cerulean kingfisher	Alcedo coerulescens
Alcedo Linnaeus, 1758	Javan blue-banded kingfisher	Alcedo euryzona
Alcedo Linnaeus, 1758	Malayan blue-banded kingfisher	Alcedo peninsulae
Alcedo Linnaeus, 1758	Shining-blue kingfisher	Alcedo quadribrachys
Alcedo Linnaeus, 1758	Blue-eared kingfisher	Alcedo meninting
Alcedo Linnaeus, 1758	Common kingfisher	Alcedo atthis
Alcedo Linnaeus, 1758	Half-collared kingfisher	Alcedo semitorquata
Alcedo Linnaeus, 1758	Blyth's kingfisher	Alcedo hercules
Ceyx Lacépède, 1799	Oriental dwarf kingfisher	Ceyx erithaca
Ceyx Lacépède, 1799	Philippine dwarf kingfisher	Ceyx melanurus
Ceyx Lacépède, 1799	Sulawesi dwarf kingfisher	Ceyx fallax
Ceyx Lacépède, 1799	Sangihe dwarf kingfisher	Ceyx sangirensis
Ceyx Lacépède, 1799	Moluccan dwarf kingfisher	Ceyx lepidus
Ceyx Lacépède, 1799	Dimorphic dwarf kingfisher	Ceyx margarethae
Ceyx Lacépède, 1799	Sula dwarf kingfisher	Ceyx wallacii
Ceyx Lacépède, 1799	Buru dwarf kingfisher	Ceyx cajeli
Ceyx Lacépède, 1799	Papuan dwarf kingfisher	Ceyx solitarius
Ceyx Lacépède, 1799	Manus dwarf kingfisher	Ceyx dispar
Ceyx Lacépède, 1799	New Ireland dwarf kingfisher	Ceyx mulcatus
Ceyx Lacépède, 1799	New Britain dwarf kingfisher	Ceyx sacerdotis
Ceyx Lacépède, 1799	North Solomons dwarf kingfisher	Ceyx meeki
Ceyx Lacépède, 1799	New Georgia dwarf kingfisher	Ceyx collectoris
Ceyx Lacépède, 1799	Malaita dwarf kingfisher	Ceyx malaitae
Ceyx Lacépède, 1799	Guadalcanal dwarf kingfisher	Ceyx nigromaxilla
Ceyx Lacépède, 1799	Makira dwarf kingfisher	Ceyx gentianus
Ceyx Lacépède, 1799	Indigo-banded kingfisher	Ceyx cyanopecta
Ceyx Lacépède, 1799	Southern silvery kingfisher	Ceyx argentatus
Ceyx Lacépède, 1799	Northern silvery kingfisher	Ceyx flumenicola
Ceyx Lacépède, 1799	Azure kingfisher	Ceyx azureus
Ceyx Lacépède, 1799	Bismarck kingfisher	Ceyx websteri
Ceyx Lacépède, 1799	Little kingfisher	Ceyx pusillus

== Description ==
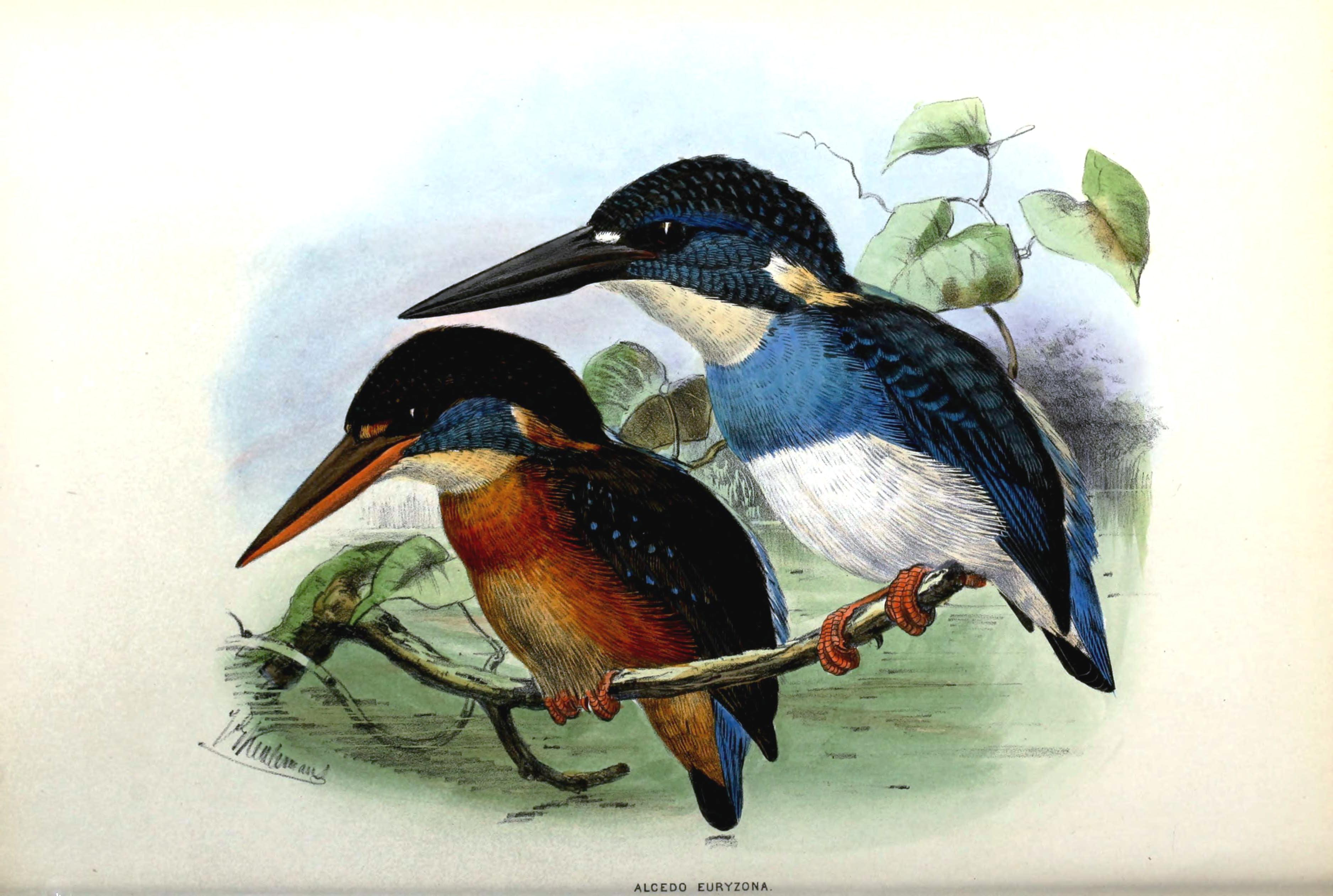
Blue-banded kingfisher

All kingfishers are short-tailed large-headed compact birds with long pointed bills. Like other Coraciiformes, they are brightly coloured. Alcedo species typically have metallic blue upperparts and head, and orange or white underparts. The sexes may be identical, as with Bismarck kingfisher, but most species show some sexual dimorphism, ranging from a different bill colour as with common kingfisher to a completely different appearance. The male blue-banded kingfisher has white underparts with a blue breast band, whereas the female has orange underparts.

The small kingfishers that make up the rest of the family have blue or orange upperparts and white or buff underparts, and show little sexual variation. Across the family, the bill colour is linked to diet. The insectivorous species have red bills, and the fish-eaters have black bills.

When perched, kingfishers sit quite upright, and the flight is fast and direct. The call is typically a simple high-pitched squeak, often given in flight.

== Distribution and habitat ==
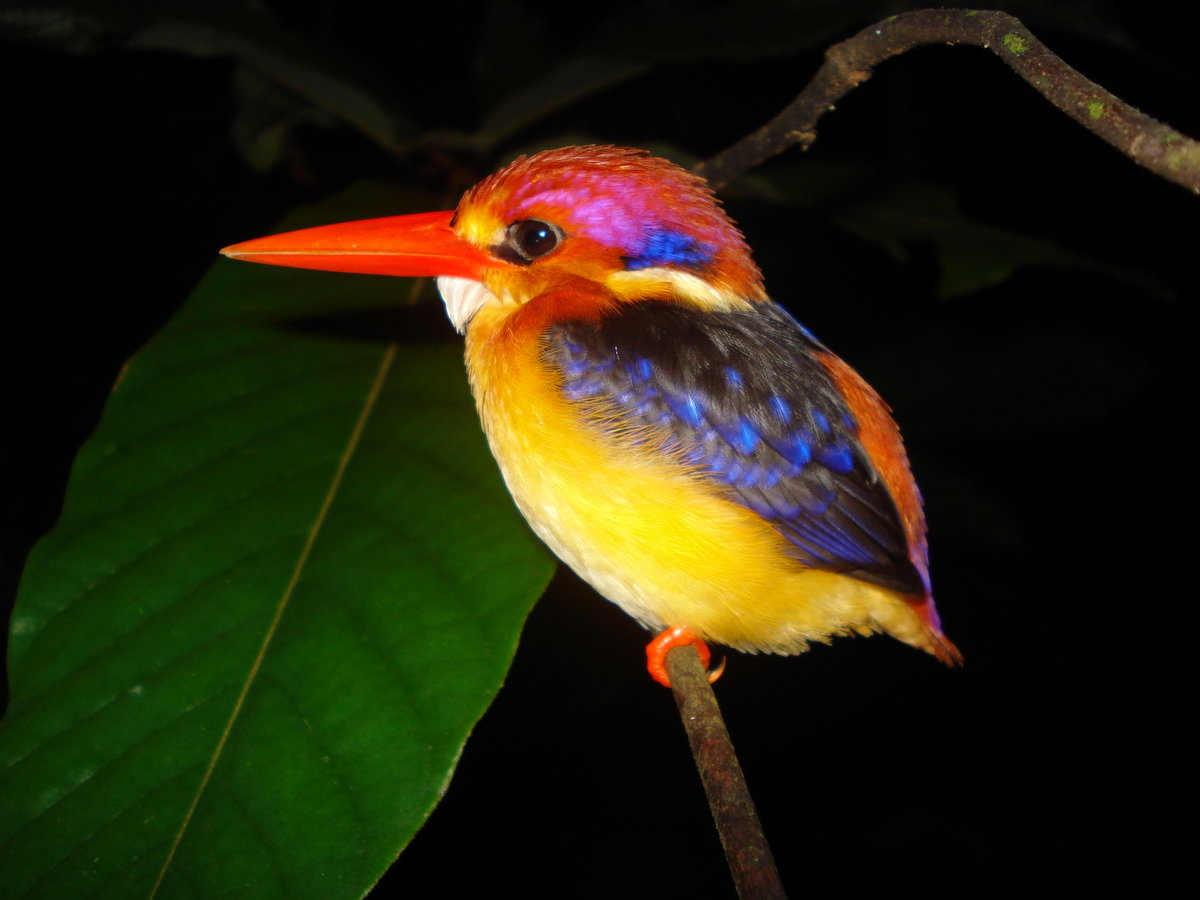
Oriental dwarf kingfisher

Most alcedinids are found in the warm climates of Africa and southern and southeast Asia. Three species reach Australia, but only the common kingfisher is found across most of Europe and temperate Asia. No members of this family are found in the Americas, although the American green kingfishers are believed to have derived from alcedinid stock. The origin of the family is thought to have been in southern Asia, which still has the most species.

The Ceyx and Ispidina species are mainly birds of wet rainforest or other woodland, and are not necessarily associated with water. The Alcedo kingfishers are usually closely associated with fresh water, often in open habitats although some are primarily forest birds.

== Behaviour ==
=== Breeding ===
River kingfishers are monogamous and territorial. The pair excavates a burrow in an earth bank and lays two or more white eggs onto the bare surface. Both parents incubate the eggs and feed the chicks. Egg laying is staggered at one-day intervals so that if food is short only the older larger nestlings get fed. The chicks are naked, blind and helpless when they hatch, and stand on their heels, unlike any adult bird.

=== Feeding ===
The small Ceyx and Ispidina species feed mainly on insects and spiders, but also take tadpoles, frogs and mayfly nymphs from puddles. They will flycatch, and their red bills are flattened to assist in the capture of insects. The Alcedo kingfishers are typically fish-eaters with black bills, but will also take aquatic invertebrates, spiders and lizards. A few species are mainly insectivorous and have red bills. Typically fish are caught by diving into the water from a perch, although the kingfisher might hover briefly.

== Sources ==
- Fry, C. Hilary; Fry, Kathie; Harris, Alan (1992). Kingfishers, Bee-eaters, and Rollers. London: Christopher Helm. ISBN 978-0-7136-8028-7.
