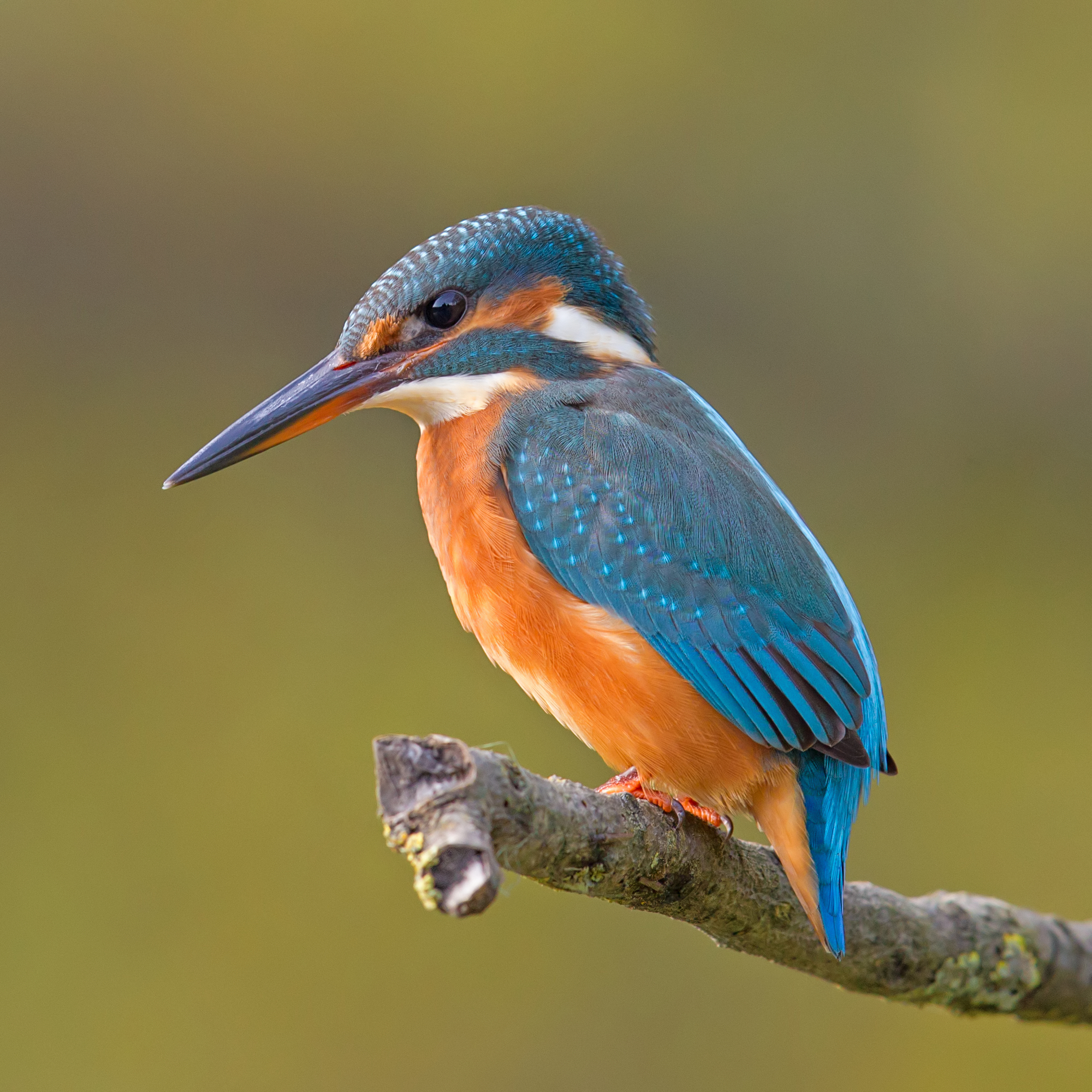
- Common kingfisher (Alcedo atthis)

Scientific classification
- Kingdom: Animalia
- Phylum: Chordata
- Class: Aves
- Order: Coraciiformes
- Family: Alcedinidae
- Subfamily: Alcedininae
- Genus: Alcedo; Linnaeus, 1758

Type species
- Alcedo ispida Linnaeus, 1758

Species
- See text

= Alcedo =

Genus of birds

Phylogeny

- Alcedo
  - Javan blue-banded kingfisher
  - - - Blue-eared kingfisher
      - Blyth's kingfisher
    - - - Half-collared kingfisher
        - Shining-blue kingfisher
      - - Cerulean kingfisher
        - Common kingfisher

Cladogram based on Andersen et al. (2017)

Alcedo is a genus of birds in the kingfisher subfamily Alcedininae. The genus was introduced by the Swedish naturalist Carl Linnaeus in 1758 in the 10th edition of his Systema Naturae. The type species is the common kingfisher (Alcedo atthis). Alcedo is the Latin for "kingfisher".

== Species ==
The genus contains the following eight species:

Image	Scientific name	Common name	Distribution
	Alcedo coerulescens	Cerulean kingfisher	Indonesia.
	Alcedo euryzona	Javan blue-banded kingfisher	Java
	Alcedo peninsulae	Malaysian blue-banded kingfisher	Myanmar, Malay Peninsula, Sumatra, southwestern Thailand and Borneo
	Alcedo quadribrachys	Shining-blue kingfisher	Senegal and Gambia to west central Nigeria to Kenya, northwest Zambia and north Angola
	Alcedo meninting	Blue-eared kingfisher	Indian subcontinent and Southeast Asia
	Alcedo atthis	Common kingfisher	across Eurasia and North Africa
	Alcedo semitorquata	Half-collared kingfisher	southern and eastern Africa.
	Alcedo hercules	Blyth's kingfisher	China, Vietnam, Myanmar, Bhutan in northeastern India, and a vagrant in Bangladesh and eastern Nepal

Unlike many kingfishers, all members of Alcedo are specialist fish-eaters. They all have some blue feathers on their upper-parts and most species have a black bill. Except for the cerulean kingfisher they all have some rufous in their plumage. The female generally has more red on the lower mandible than the male. The smallest species is the cerulean kingfisher which is around 13 cm (5.1 in) in length; much the largest is Blyth's kingfisher with a length of 22 cm (8.7 in).

== Sources ==
- Fry, C. Hilary; Fry, Kathie; Harris, Alan (1992). Kingfishers, Bee-eaters, and Rollers. London: Christopher Helm. ISBN 978-0-7136-8028-7.
