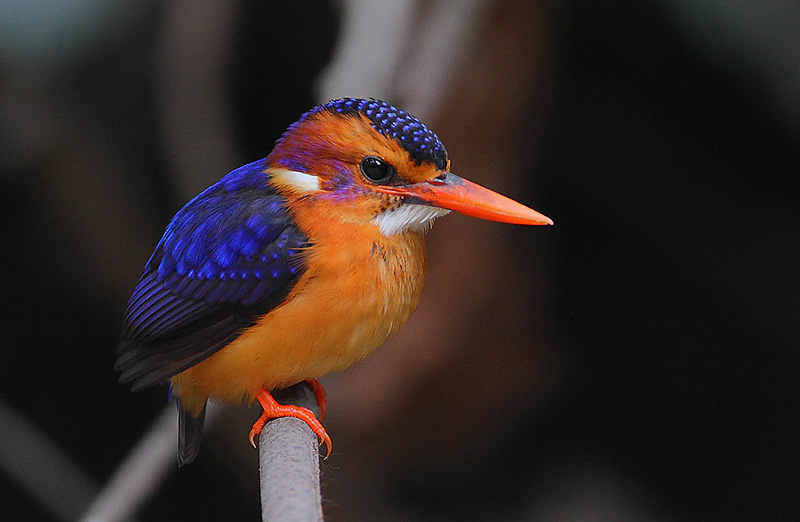
- African pygmy kingfisher (Ispidina picta)
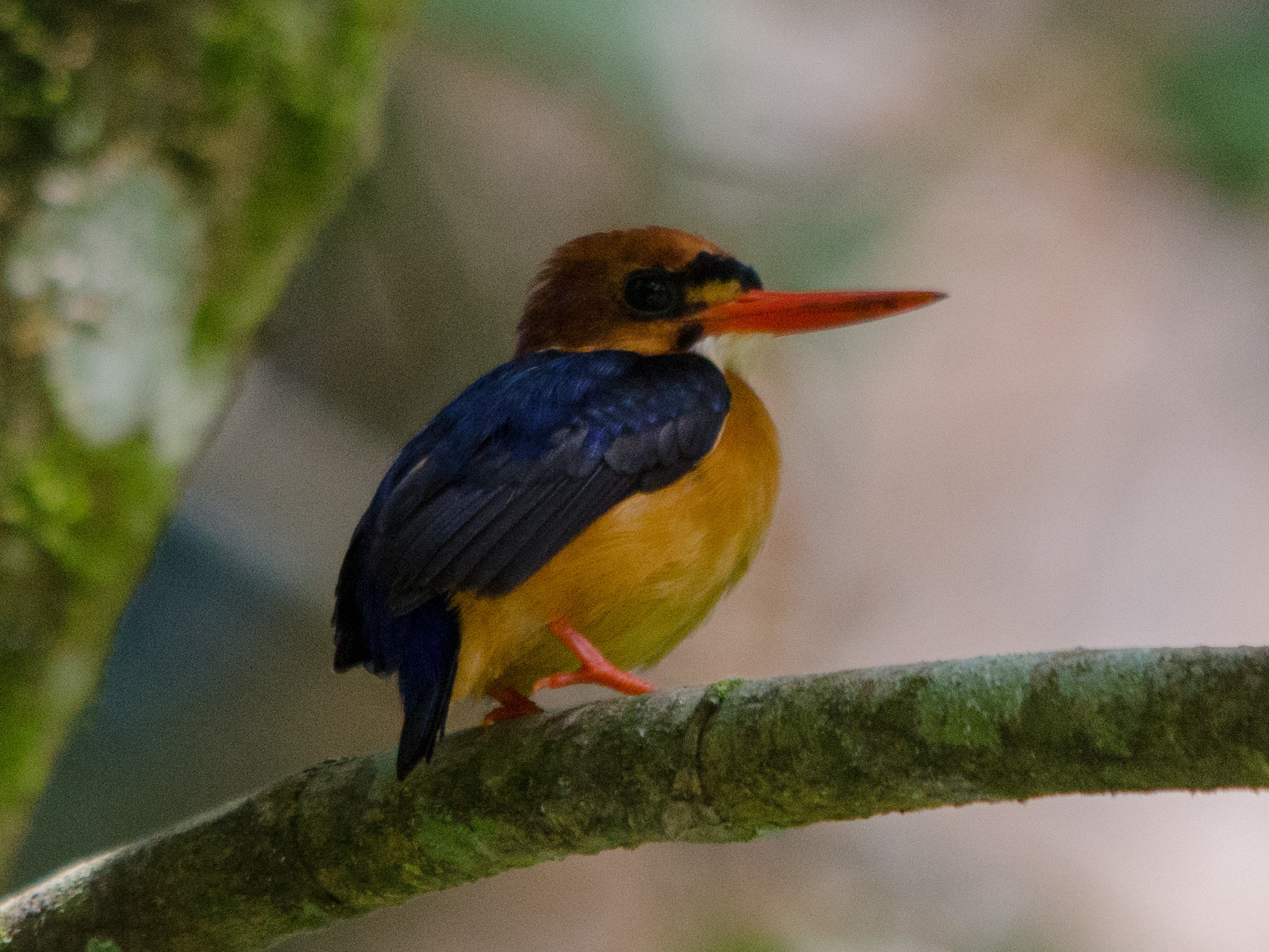
- African dwarf kingfisher (Ispidina lecontei)

Scientific classification
- Kingdom: Animalia
- Phylum: Chordata
- Class: Aves
- Order: Coraciiformes
- Family: Alcedinidae
- Subfamily: Alcedininae
- Genus: Ispidina; Kaup, 1848

Type species
- Todus pictus Boddaert, 1783

Species
- see text
- African pygmy kingfisher range Extant (resident) Extant (breeding)
- African dwarf kingfisher range

= Ispidina =

Genus of birds

Ispidina is a genus of small insectivorous African river kingfishers.

The genus was introduced by the German naturalist Johann Jakob Kaup in 1848 with the African pygmy kingfisher (Ispidina picta) as the type species. The genus is the sister group to the genus Corythornis containing four small African kingfishers.

== Species ==
The two species in the genus are:

Genus Ispidina – Kaup, 1848 – two species
Common name	Scientific name and subspecies	Range	Size and ecology	IUCN status and estimated population
African pygmy kingfisher	Ispidina picta (Boddaert, 1783) Three subspecies: I. p. picta (Boddaert, 1783); I. p. ferrugina Clancey, 1984; I. p. natalensis (Smith, A, 1832)	Africa south of the Sahara	Size: Habitat: Diet:	LC
African dwarf kingfisher	Ispidina lecontei Cassin, 1856 Two subspecies: I. l. ruficeps Hartlaub, 1857; I. l. lecontei Cassin, 1856	Angola, Cameroon, Central African Republic, Republic of the Congo, Democratic Republic of the Congo, Ivory Coast, Equatorial Guinea, Gabon, Ghana, Guinea, Liberia, Nigeria, Sierra Leone, South Sudan, and Uganda.	Size: Habitat: Diet:	LC

These similar small kingfishers can be distinguished by the blue crown of the African pigmy kingfisher. They have different habit preferences and have mostly non-overlapping ranges. The slightly smaller African dwarf kingfisher occurs in tropical rainforests while the African pygmy kingfisher occurs in dry grassy woodland.
