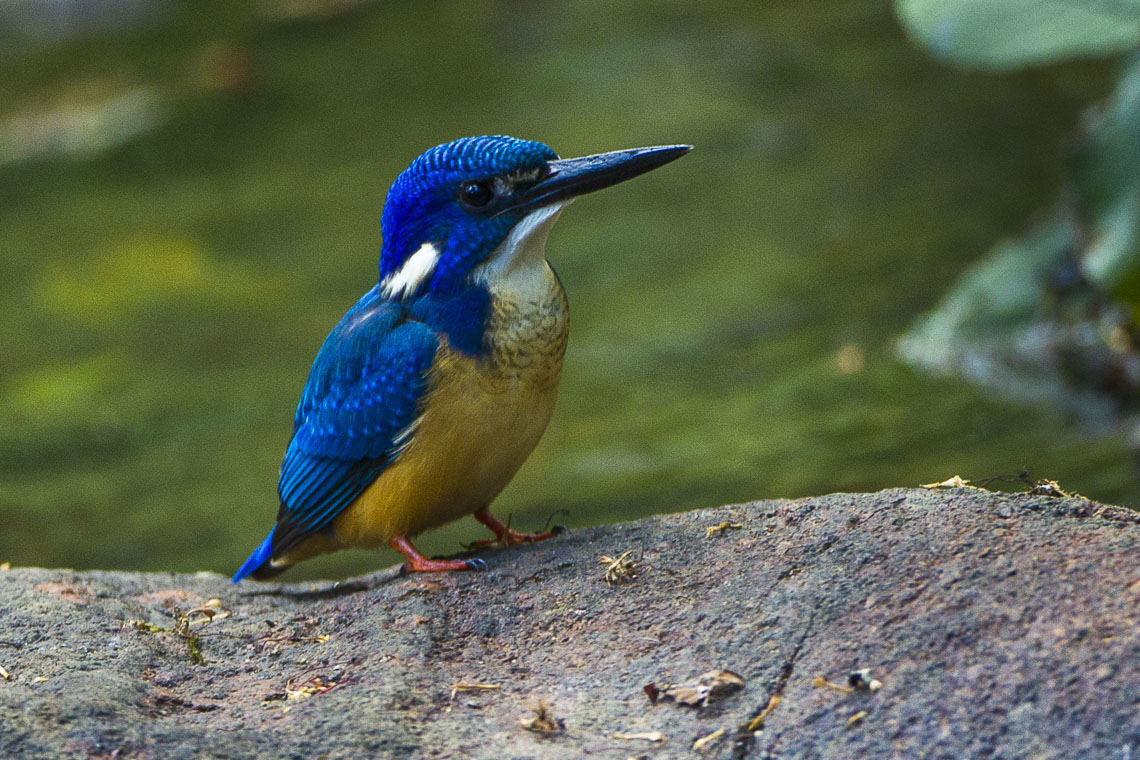

Conservation status
- Least Concern (IUCN 3.1)

Scientific classification
- Kingdom: Animalia
- Phylum: Chordata
- Class: Aves
- Order: Coraciiformes
- Family: Alcedinidae
- Subfamily: Alcedininae
- Genus: Alcedo
- Species: A. semitorquata

Binomial name
- Alcedo semitorquata Swainson, 1823

= Half-collared kingfisher =

Species of bird

The half-collared kingfisher (Alcedo semitorquata) is a kingfisher in the subfamily Alcedininae that is found in southern and eastern Africa. It feeds almost exclusively on fish and frequents streams, rivers and larger bodies of water with dense shoreline vegetation.

The half-collared kingfisher was described by the English ornithologist William Swainson in 1823 and given its current binomial name Alcedo semitorquata. The word Alcedo is the Latin for a "kingfisher". The specific epithet semitorquata is from the Latin semi- for "half" or "small" and torquatus for "collared". The half-collared kingfisher is one of eight species in the genus Alcedo and is most closely related to the shining-blue kingfisher (Alcedo quadribrachys).

It is known to sometimes vocalize while approaching its nest, but the purpose or advantage of this behavior is unclear.

== Description ==
The half-collared kingfisher is a medium-sized kingfisher. It is around 18 cm (7.1 in) in length with a weight of 35–40 g (1.2–1.4 oz). It has blue upperparts, a white throat and pale orange underparts. The head has alternating light blue and dark blue bands running across the crown and each side of the neck has a creamy white stripe. The dark blue patches on either side of the neck form a half collar. The legs and feet are red. The sexes are very similar but the bill of the male is entirely black while the female has some red at the base of the lower mandible.
