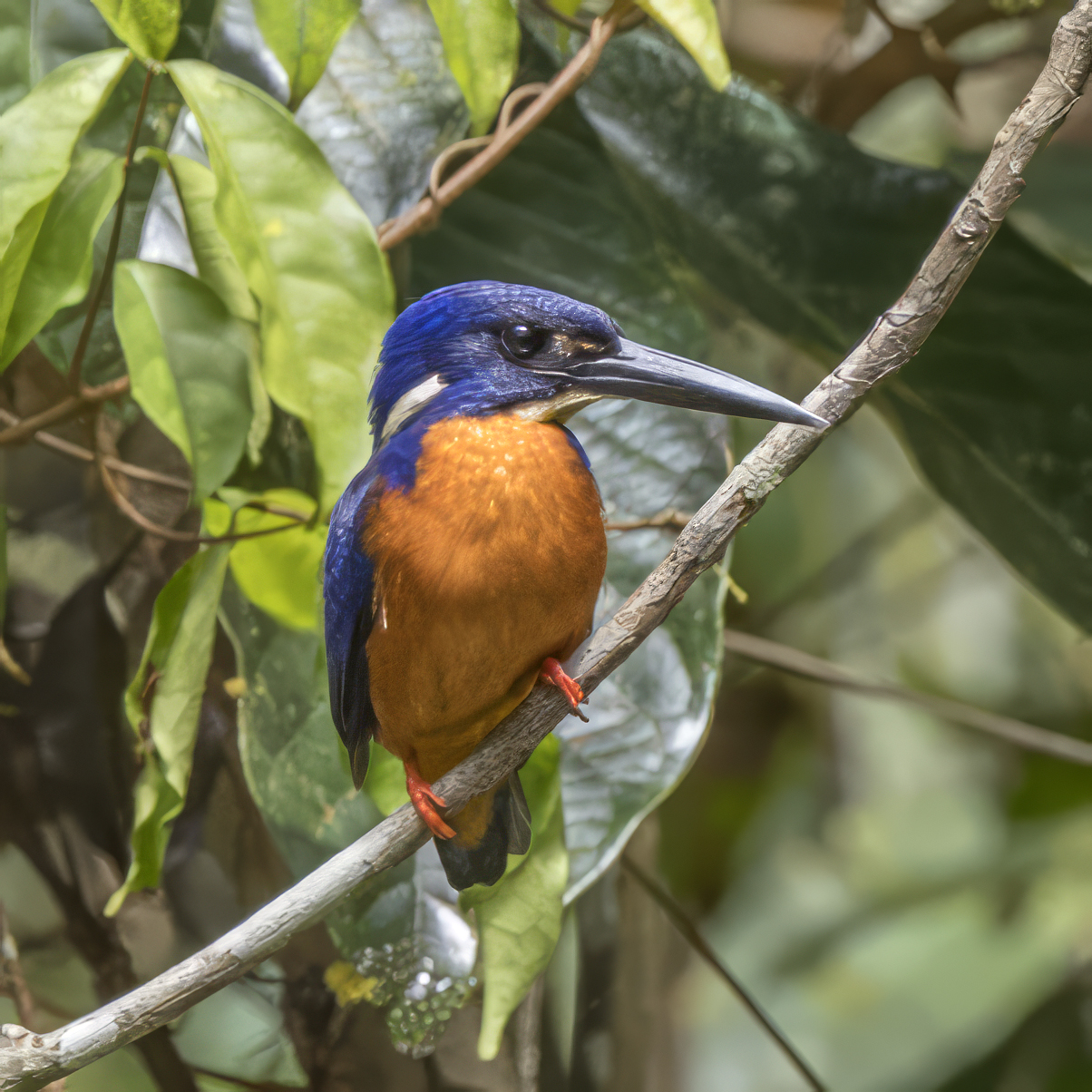
- Alcedo quadribrachys quadribrachys Ghana

Conservation status
- Least Concern (IUCN 3.1)

Scientific classification
- Kingdom: Animalia
- Phylum: Chordata
- Class: Aves
- Order: Coraciiformes
- Family: Alcedinidae
- Subfamily: Alcedininae
- Genus: Alcedo
- Species: A. quadribrachys

Binomial name
- Alcedo quadribrachys Bonaparte, 1850

= Shining-blue kingfisher =

Species of bird

The shining-blue kingfisher (Alcedo quadribrachys) is a species of bird in the family Alcedinidae. It is found in tropical Africa.

The shining-blue kingfisher was described of by the French ornithologist Charles Lucien Bonaparte in 1850 and given its current binomial name Alcedo quadribrachys. The name Alcedo is the Latin word for a "kingfisher". The specific epithet quadribrachys is from the Latin quadri- for "four" and brachium meaning "arms" or in this case "toes". The shining-blue kingfisher is one of eight species in the genus Alcedo and is most closely related to the half-collared kingfisher (Alcedo semitorquata).

There are two subspecies:

- A. q. quadribrachys Bonaparte, 1850 – Senegal and Gambia to west central Nigeria
- A. q. guentheri Sharpe, 1892 – southern Nigeria to Kenya, northwest Zambia and north Angola
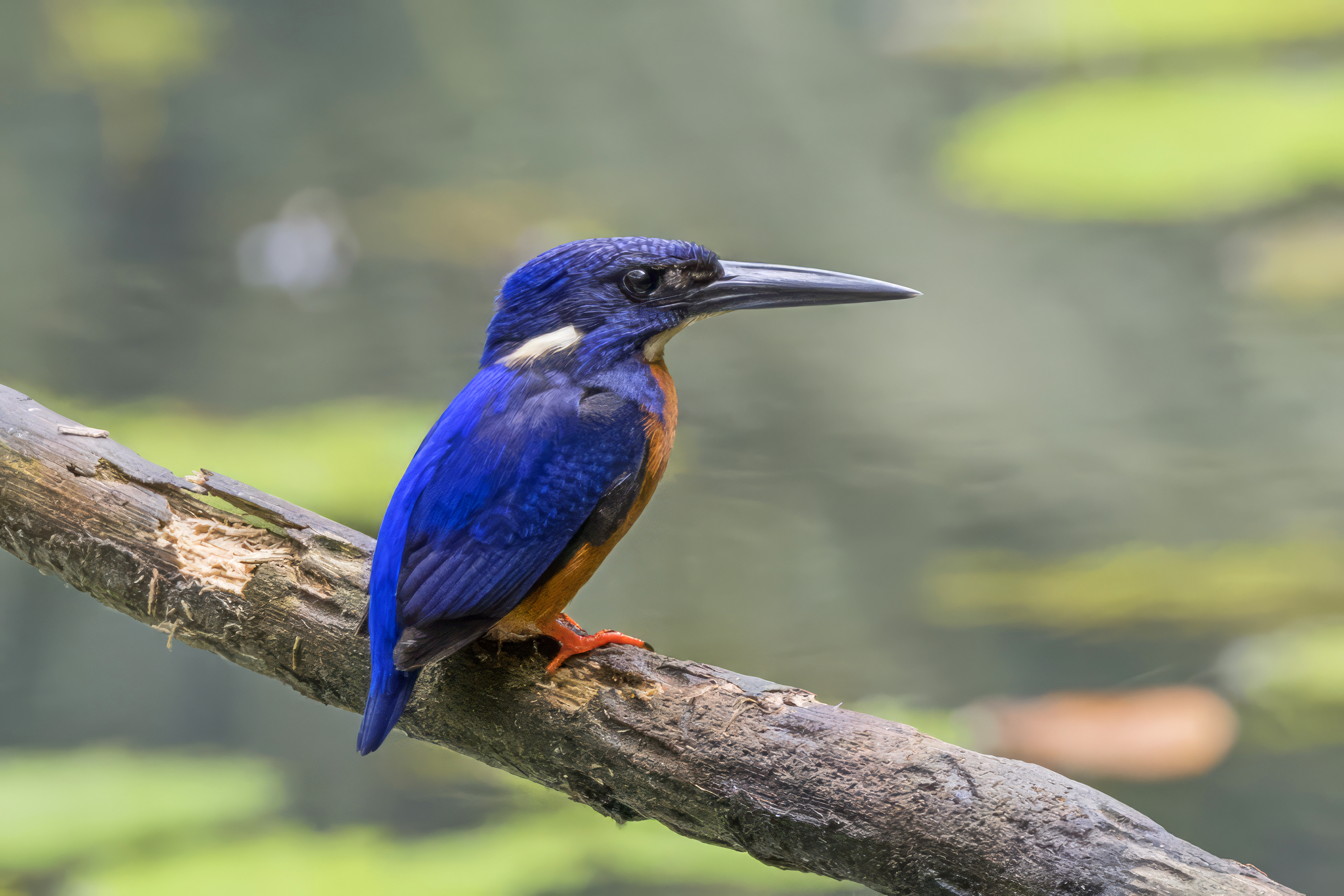
A. q. quadribrachys, Ghana

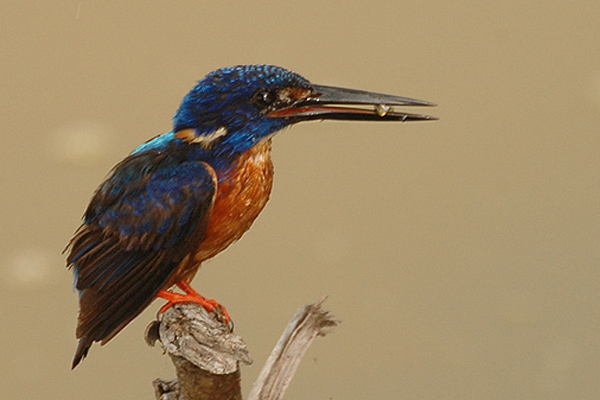
A. q. guentheri, Uganda

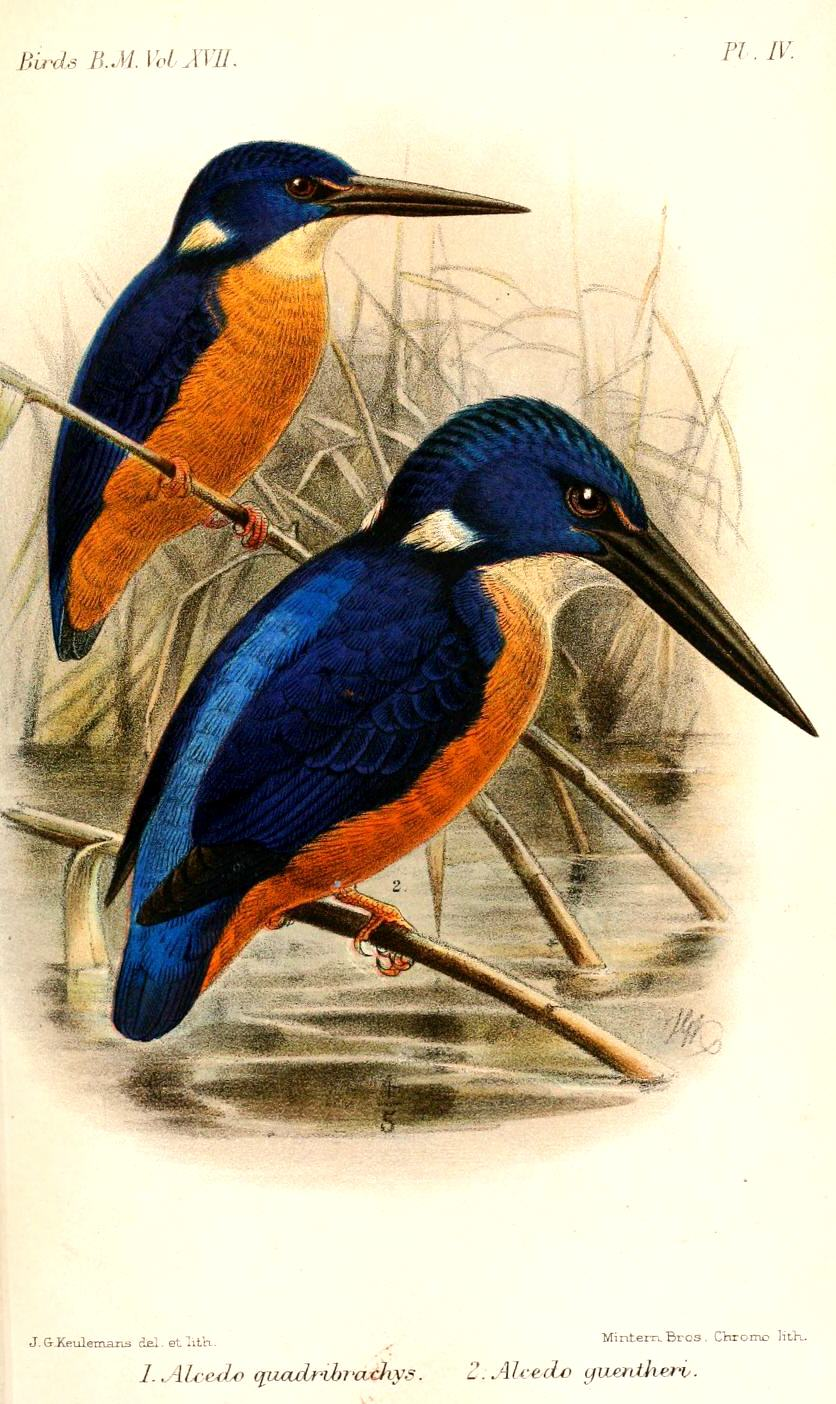
Subspecies A. q. quadribrachys (top) and A. q. guentheri (bottom); illustration by Keulemans, 1892
