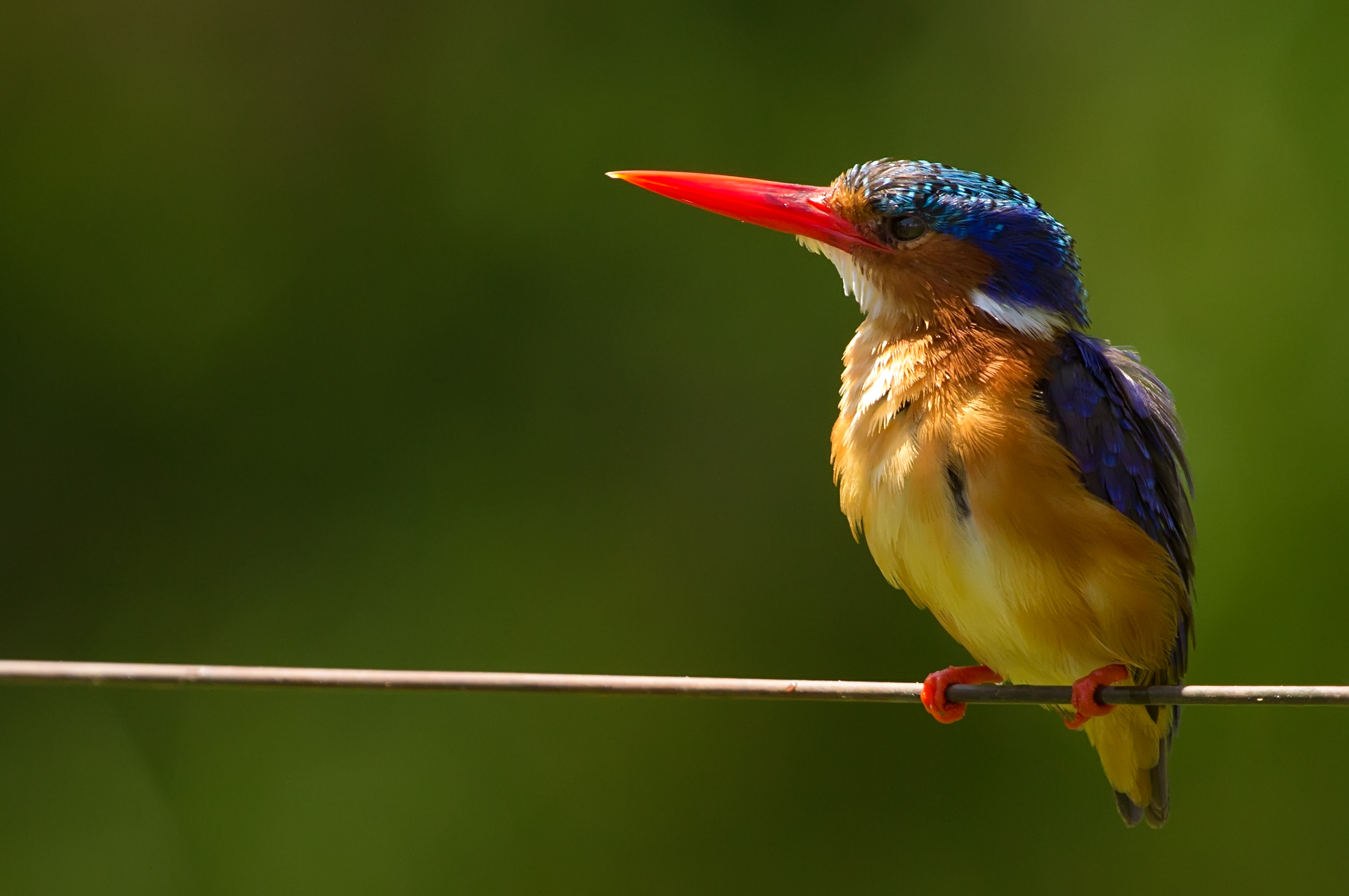
- Malachite kingfisher (Corythornis cristatus)

Scientific classification
- Kingdom: Animalia
- Phylum: Chordata
- Class: Aves
- Order: Coraciiformes
- Family: Alcedinidae
- Subfamily: Alcedininae
- Genus: Corythornis; Kaup, 1848

Type species
- Alcedo nais Kaup, 1848

Species
- see text

= Corythornis =

Genus of birds

Phylogeny

- Corythornis
  - Madagascar pygmy kingfisher
  - - White-bellied kingfisher
    - - Malagasy kingfisher
      - Malachite kingfisher

Cladogram based on Andersen et al. (2017)

Corythornis is a genus of small African river kingfishers.

A molecular phylogenetic study of the alcedinine kingfishers published in 2007 found that the genera as then defined did not form monophyletic groups. The species were subsequently rearranged into four genera, with four species in the resurrected genus Corythornis. The genus had been introduced by the German naturalist Johann Jakob Kaup in 1848. The type species is the Príncipe kingfisher (Alcedo cristatus nais). Corythornis is the sister group to the genus Ispidina containing two small African kingfishers.

== Species ==
The genus contains the following four species:

Genus Corythornis – Kaup, 1848 – four species
Common name	Scientific name and subspecies	Range	Size and ecology	IUCN status and estimated population
Madagascar pygmy kingfisher	Corythornis madagascariensis (Linnaeus, 1766) Two subspecies: C. m. madagascariensis - (Linnaeus, 1766); C. m. dilutus - (Benson, 1974)	Madagascar	Size: Habitat: Diet:	LC
White-bellied kingfisher	Corythornis leucogaster (Fraser, 1843) Three subspecies: C. l. bowdleri (Neumann, 1908); C. l. leucogaster (Fraser, 1843); C. l. leopoldi (Dubois, AJC, 1905)	Guinea to Mali and Ghana, Nigeria to north west Angola, Bioko Island, east Congo to south Uganda and northwest Zambia	Size: Habitat: Diet:	LC
Malachite kingfisher	Corythornis cristatus (Pallas, 1764) Five subspecies: C. c. galeritus (Statius Müller, PL, 1776); C. c. nais (Kaup, 1848); C. c. thomensis Salvadori, 1902; C. c. cristatus (Pallas, 1764); C. c. stuartkeithi Dickerman, 1989	Sub-Saharan Africa except for the very arid parts of Somalia, Kenya, Namibia and Botswana.	Size: Habitat: Diet:	LC
Malagasy kingfisher	Corythornis vintsioides (Eydoux & Gervais, 1836) Two subspecies: C. v. johannae Meinertzhagen, R., 1924; C. v. vintsioides (Eydoux & Gervais, 1836) – Madagascar	Madagascar, Mayotte and the Comoros.	Size: Habitat: Diet:	LC
