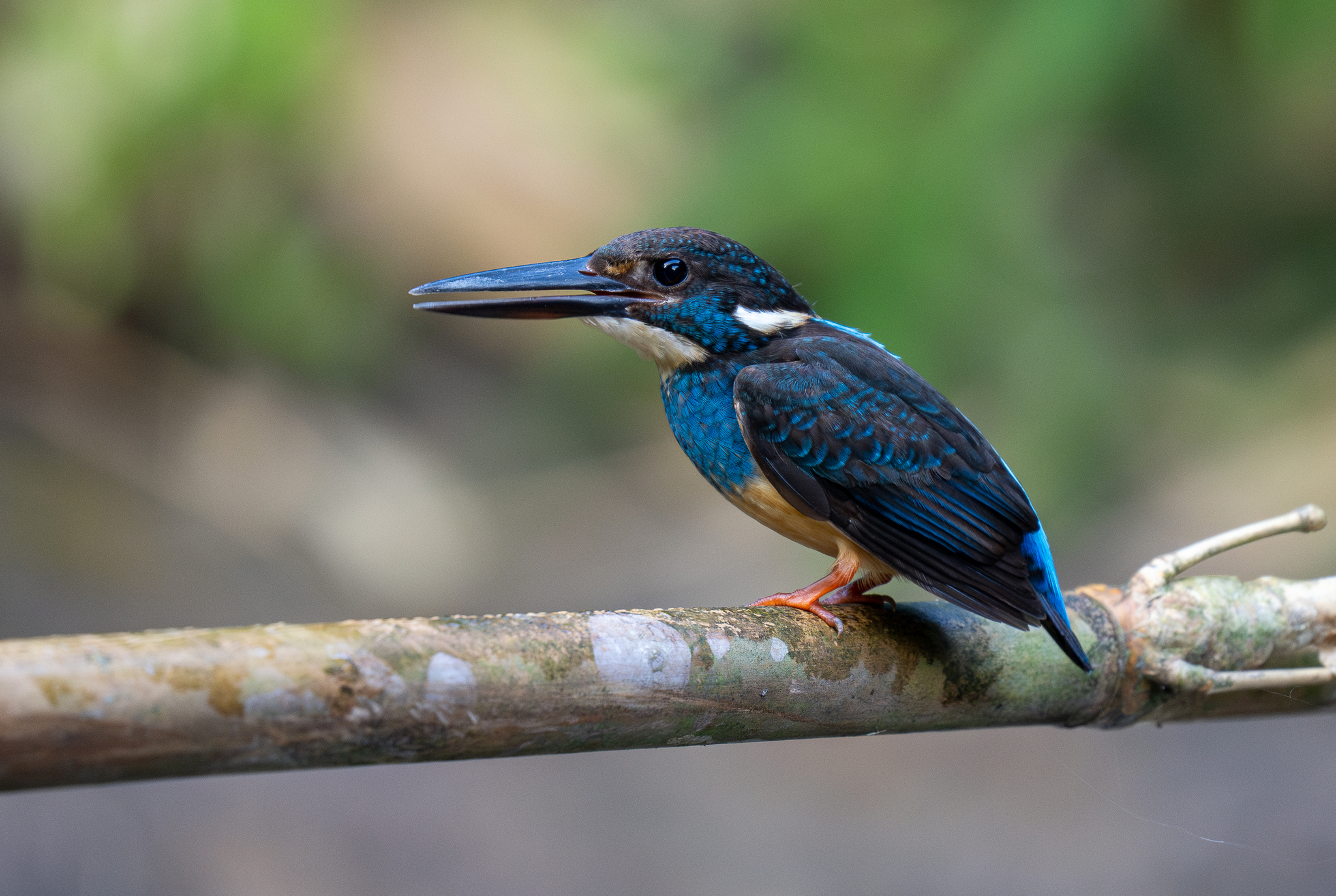

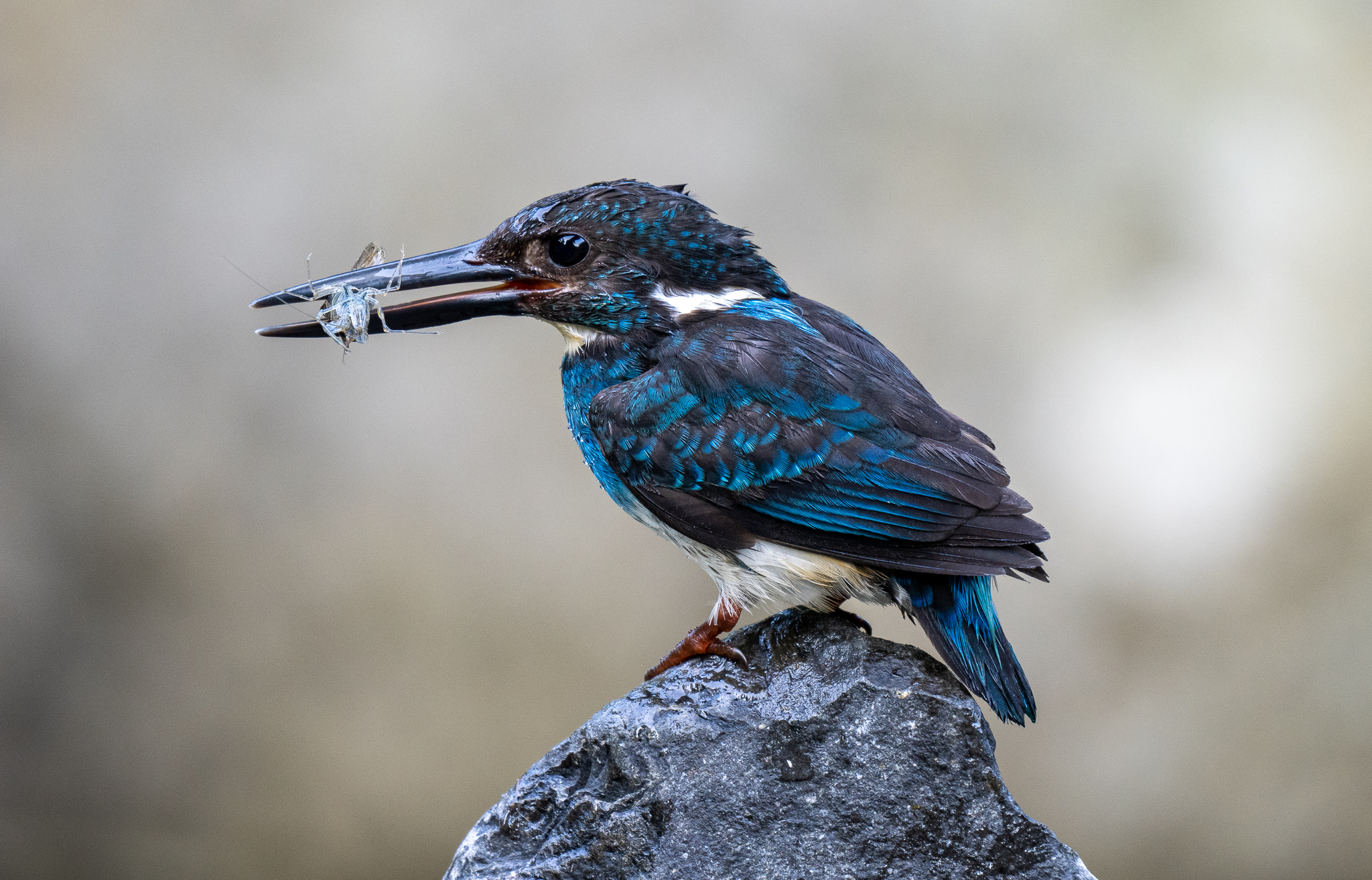

Conservation status
- Critically Endangered (IUCN 3.1)

Scientific classification
- Kingdom: Animalia
- Phylum: Chordata
- Class: Aves
- Order: Coraciiformes
- Family: Alcedinidae
- Subfamily: Alcedininae
- Genus: Alcedo
- Species: A. euryzona

Binomial name
- Alcedo euryzona Temminck, 1830

= Javan blue-banded kingfisher =

Species of bird

The Javan blue-banded kingfisher (Alcedo euryzona), is a species of kingfisher in the subfamily Alcedininae. It is endemic to and found throughout Java, but is thought to be extremely rare due to human pressures such as habitat destruction. Its natural habitats are subtropical or tropical moist lowland forest, subtropical or tropical mangrove forest, and rivers. Its population is estimated to be just 50-249 individuals, and is believed to be in decline.

It is a small, rather dark kingfisher. The male is highly distinctive, with a broad blue-green band across a white chest. The female is very different, with an all-orange belly; distinguished from the common kingfisher (A. atthis) by an overall duller, darker coloration and the lack of a bright white-and-orange patch behind the eye, its call is piercing similar to the common kingfisher.

== Taxonomy ==
The first formal description of the Javan blue-banded kingfisher was by the Dutch zoologist Coenraad Jacob Temminck in 1830. In his initial publication the binomial name was incorrectly printed as Alcedo cryzona but this was later corrected to Alcedo euryzona. The specific epithet euryzona is from the classical Greek eurus meaning "broad" and zōnē meaning "band" or "belt".
