= Silvery kingfisher =

Silvery kingfisher has been split into the following species:

- Southern silvery kingfisher, Ceyx argentatus
- Northern silvery kingfisher, Ceyx flumenicola
