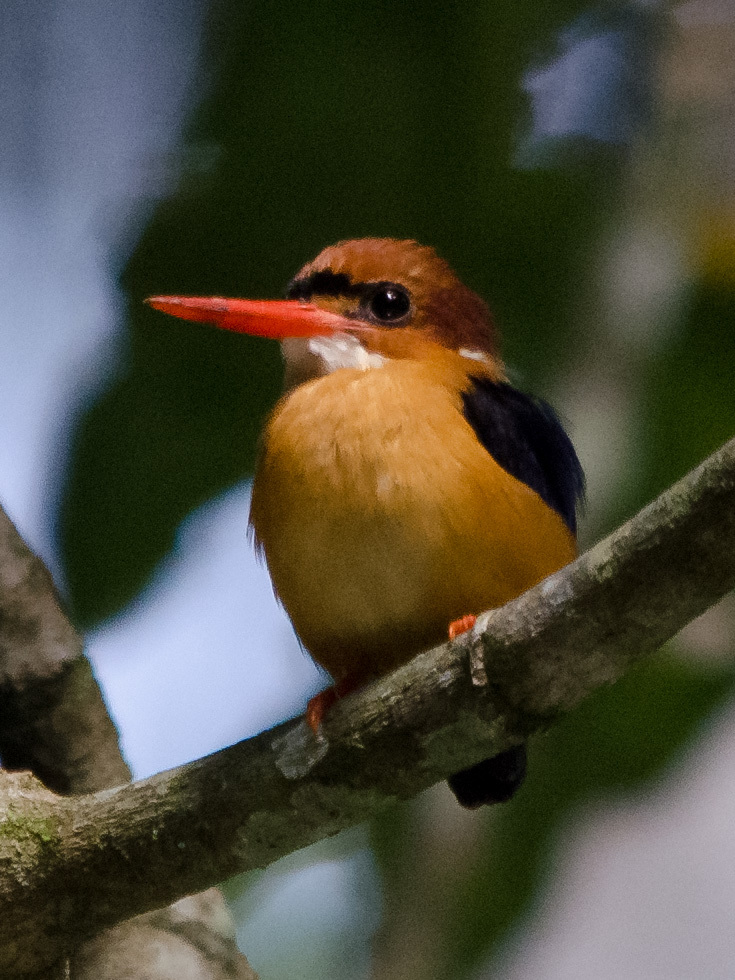

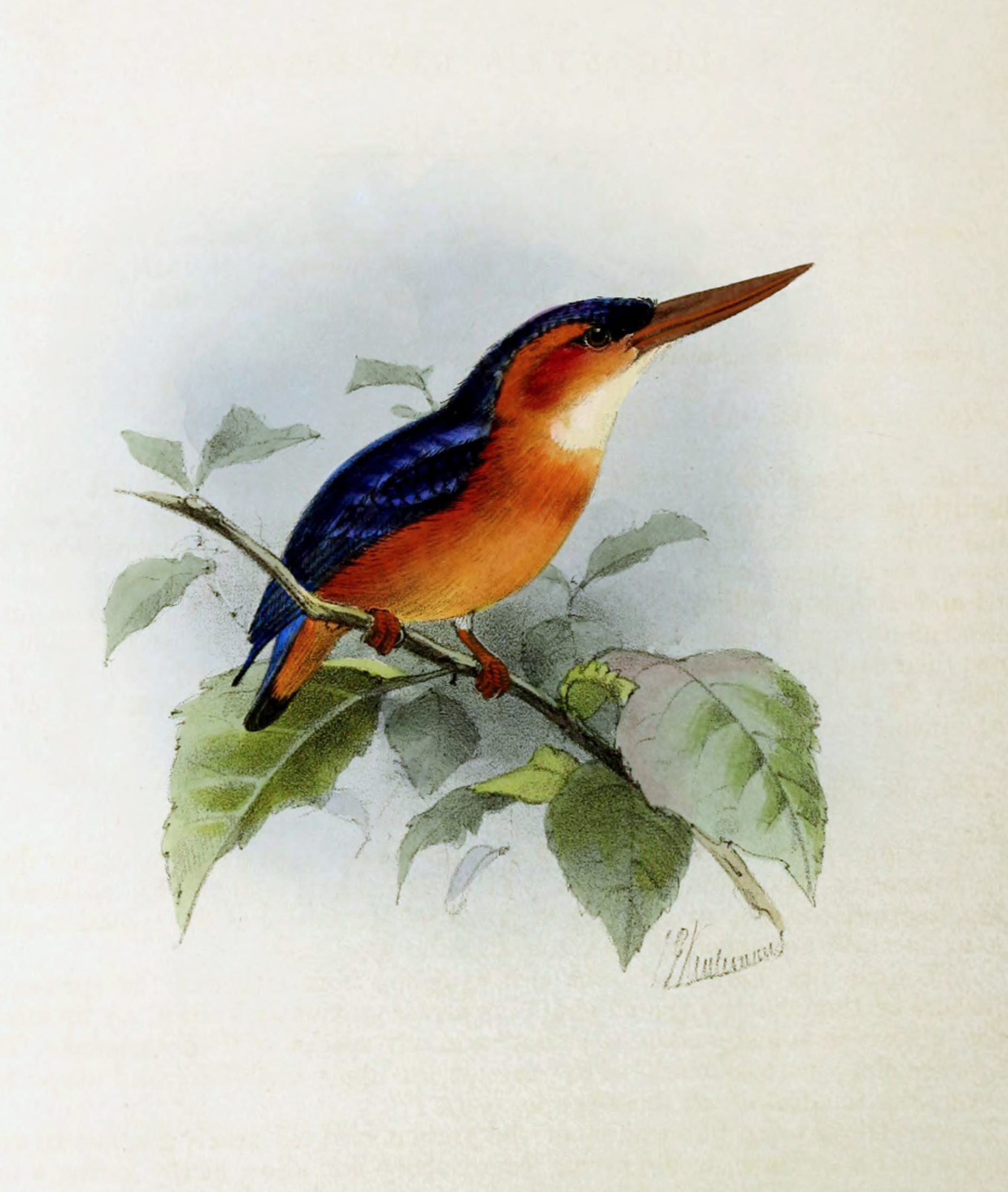
- illustration by John Gerrard Keulemans

Conservation status
- Least Concern (IUCN 3.1)

Scientific classification
- Kingdom: Animalia
- Phylum: Chordata
- Class: Aves
- Order: Coraciiformes
- Family: Alcedinidae
- Subfamily: Alcedininae
- Genus: Ispidina
- Species: I. lecontei

Binomial name
- Ispidina lecontei Cassin, 1856
- IUCN range Extant (resident)
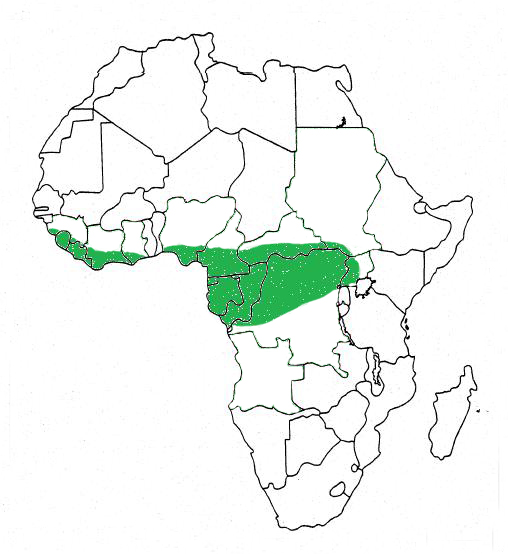

Synonyms
- Ceyx lecontei

= African dwarf kingfisher =

Species of bird

This article discusses the African dwarf kingfisher, which is distinct from the Oriental dwarf kingfisher.

The African dwarf kingfisher (Ispidina lecontei) is a species of kingfisher in the Alcedininae subfamily.

== Taxonomy ==
The African dwarf kingfisher was described in 1856 by the American ornithologist John Cassin from a specimen collected by Paul Du Chaillu. Cassin introduced the current binomial name Ispidina lecontei. The specific epithet was chosen in honour of the entomologist John Lawrence LeConte.

There are two subspecies:

- I. l. ruficeps Hartlaub, 1857 – Sierra Leone to Ghana, west of the Dahomey gap in the rainforest.
- I. l. lecontei Cassin, 1856 – south Nigeria to west South Sudan, Uganda and central Democratic Republic of the Congo; central Angola.

== Description ==
This is the world's smallest kingfisher with a length of 10 centimetres (3.9 in) and a weight of 9–12 grams (0.32–0.42 oz).

== Distribution ==
It inhabits African rainforests and is found in Angola, Cameroon, Central African Republic, Republic of the Congo, Democratic Republic of the Congo, Ivory Coast, Equatorial Guinea, Gabon, Ghana, Guinea, Liberia, Nigeria, Sierra Leone, South Sudan, and Uganda.
