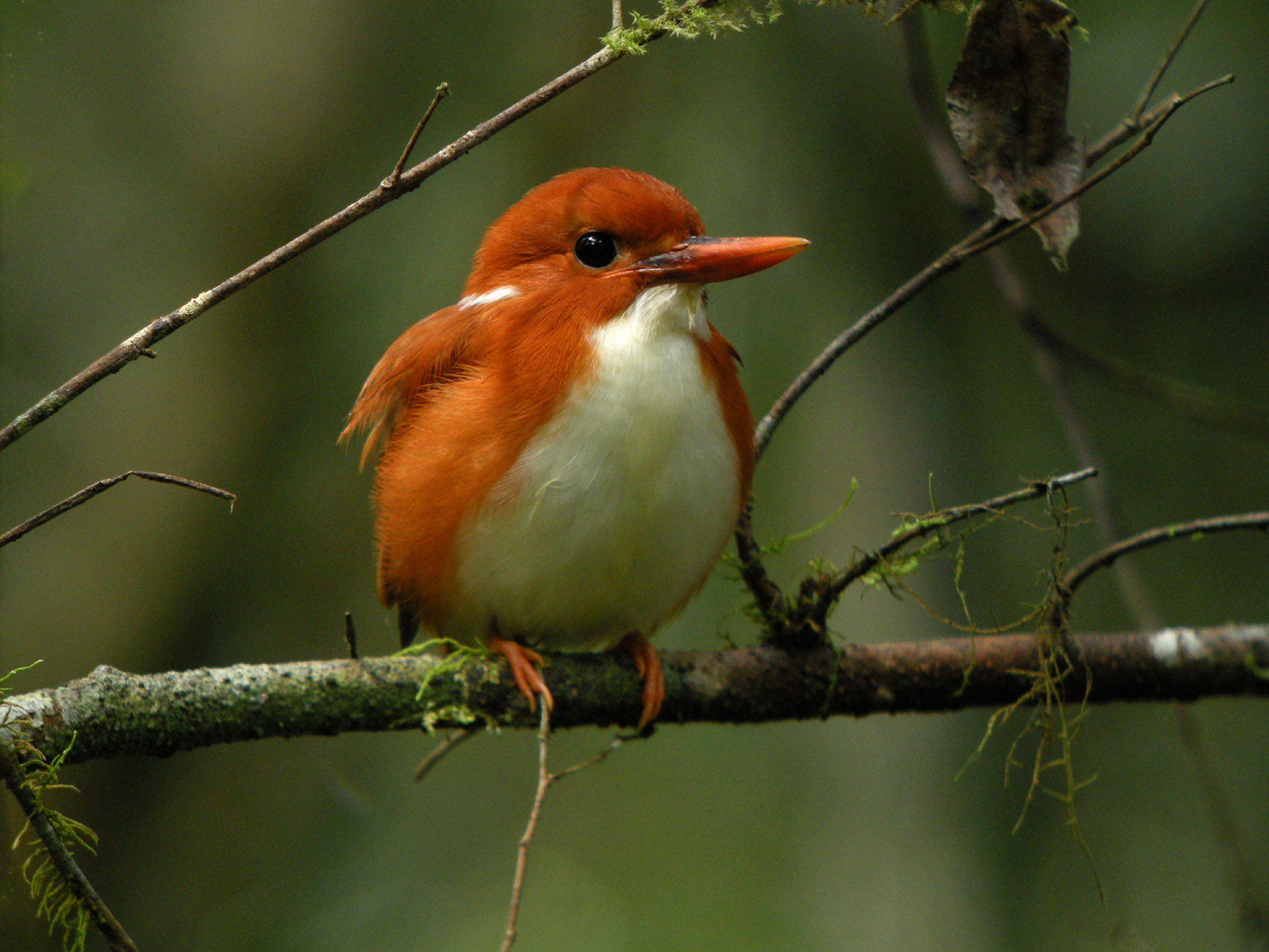
- At Mantadia National Park, Madagascar

Conservation status
- Least Concern (IUCN 3.1)

Scientific classification
- Kingdom: Animalia
- Phylum: Chordata
- Class: Aves
- Order: Coraciiformes
- Family: Alcedinidae
- Subfamily: Alcedininae
- Genus: Corythornis
- Species: C. madagascariensis

Binomial name
- Corythornis madagascariensis (Linnaeus, 1766)

Subspecies
- C. m. madagascariensis - (Linnaeus, 1766); C. m. dilutus - (Benson, 1974)

Synonyms
- Alcedo madagascariensis Linnaeus, 1766; Ceyx madagascariensis (Linnaeus, 1766); Ispidina madagascariensis (Linnaeus, 1766)

= Madagascar pygmy kingfisher =

Species of bird

The Madagascar pygmy kingfisher (Corythornis madagascariensis) is a species of bird in the family Alcedinidae. It is endemic to Madagascar and found in western dry deciduous forests.

== Taxonomy ==
The first formal description of the Madagascan pygmy kingfisher was by the Swedish naturalist Carl Linnaeus in 1758 in the twelfth edition of his Systema Naturae under the binomial name Alcedo madagascariensis.

Although it has been placed in the genera Ceyx and Ispidina in the past, a study of its molecular phylogenetic relationships with other genera in the region suggests it is best treated as a member of the genus Corythornis.

== Description ==
The Madagascar pygmy kingfisher is not sexually dimorphic. Birds of this species have a bright, rufous-orange body with a pinkish wash on the back and head, white underparts, a prominent white spot on either side of the neck, and bluish-gray primary flight feathers. The bill and feet are a bright, almost fluorescent orange-red color.

This species grows to around 13 cm (5-6 inches) long, and weighs about 17-22 grams (0.6-0.7 ounces).
