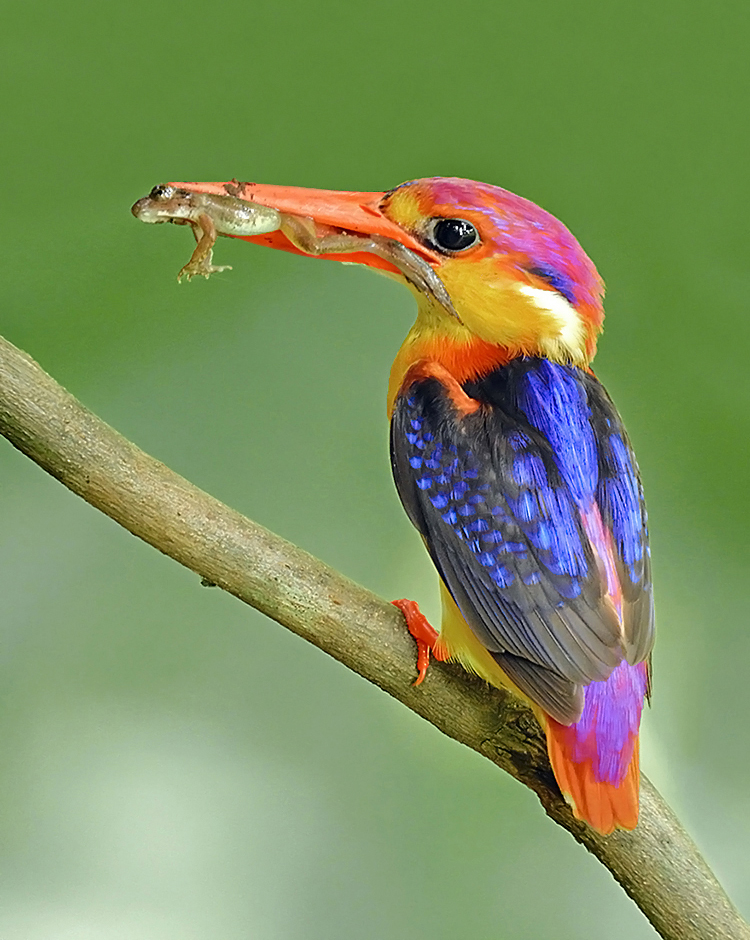
- With frog kill from Mangaon, Maharashtra, India

Conservation status
- Near Threatened (IUCN 3.1)

Scientific classification
- Kingdom: Animalia
- Phylum: Chordata
- Class: Aves
- Order: Coraciiformes
- Family: Alcedinidae
- Subfamily: Alcedininae
- Genus: Ceyx
- Species: C. erithaca

Binomial name
- Ceyx erithaca (Linnaeus, 1758)

= Black-backed dwarf kingfisher =

Species of bird

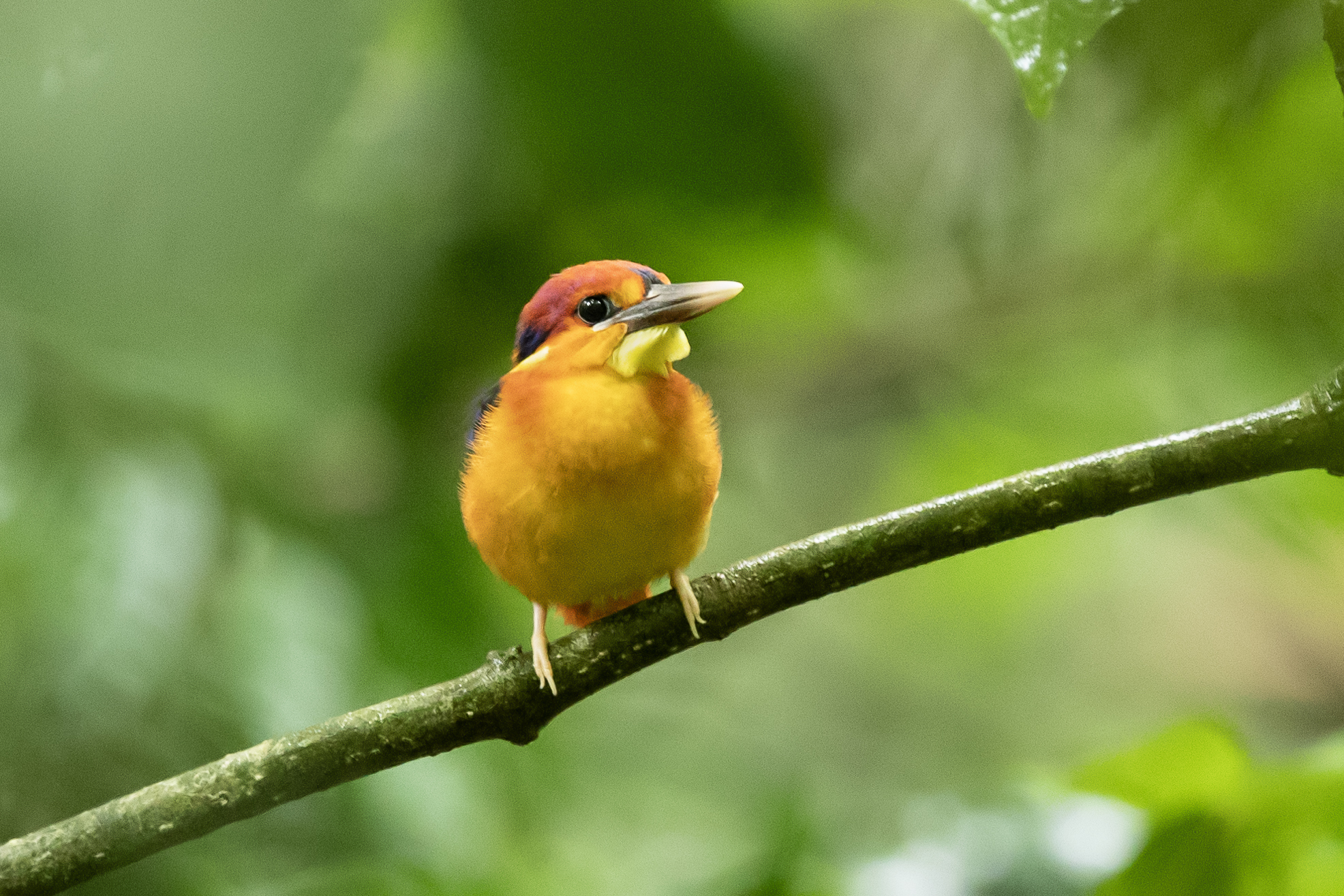
From Thattekkad Bird Sanctuary

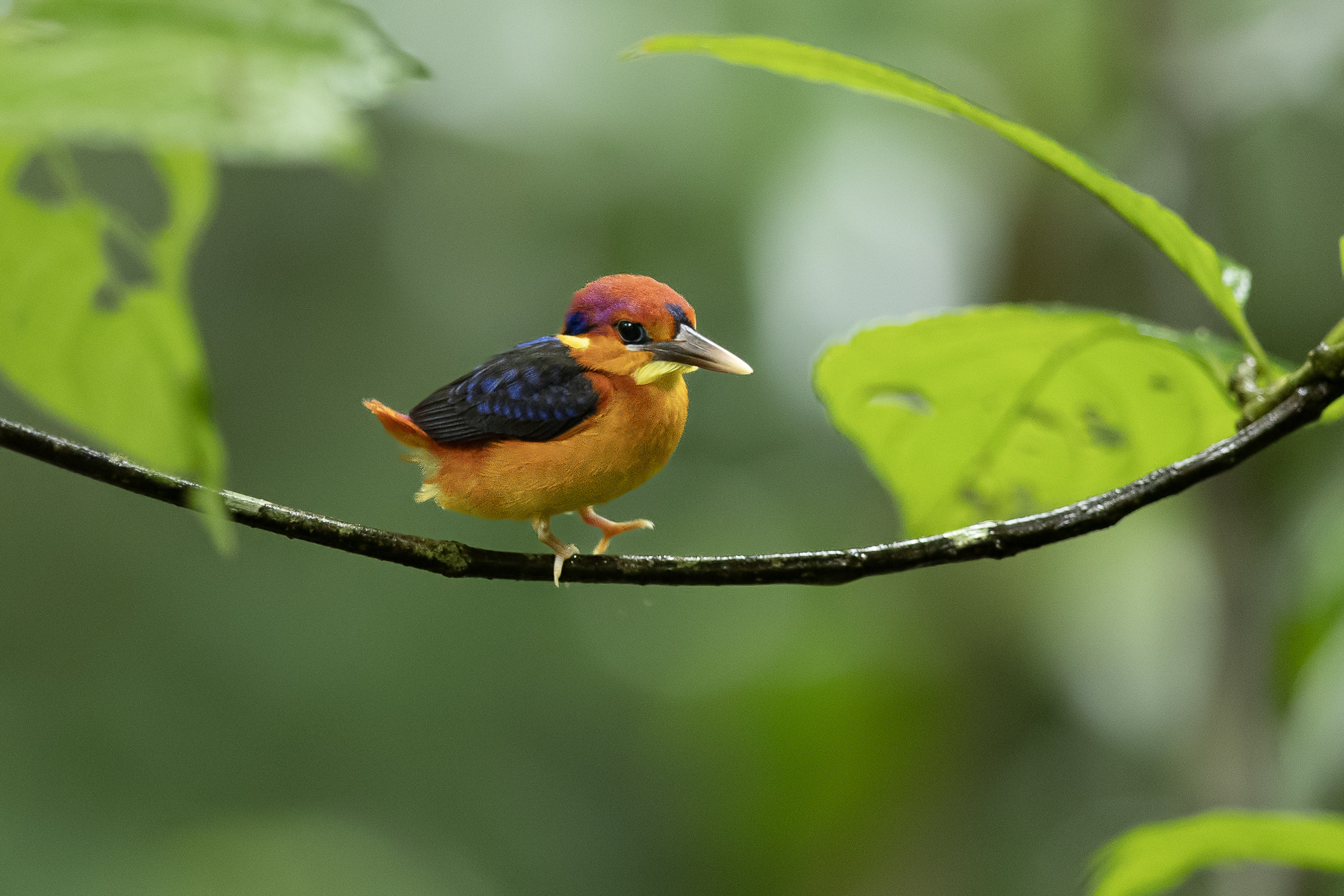
From Thattekkad Bird Sanctuary

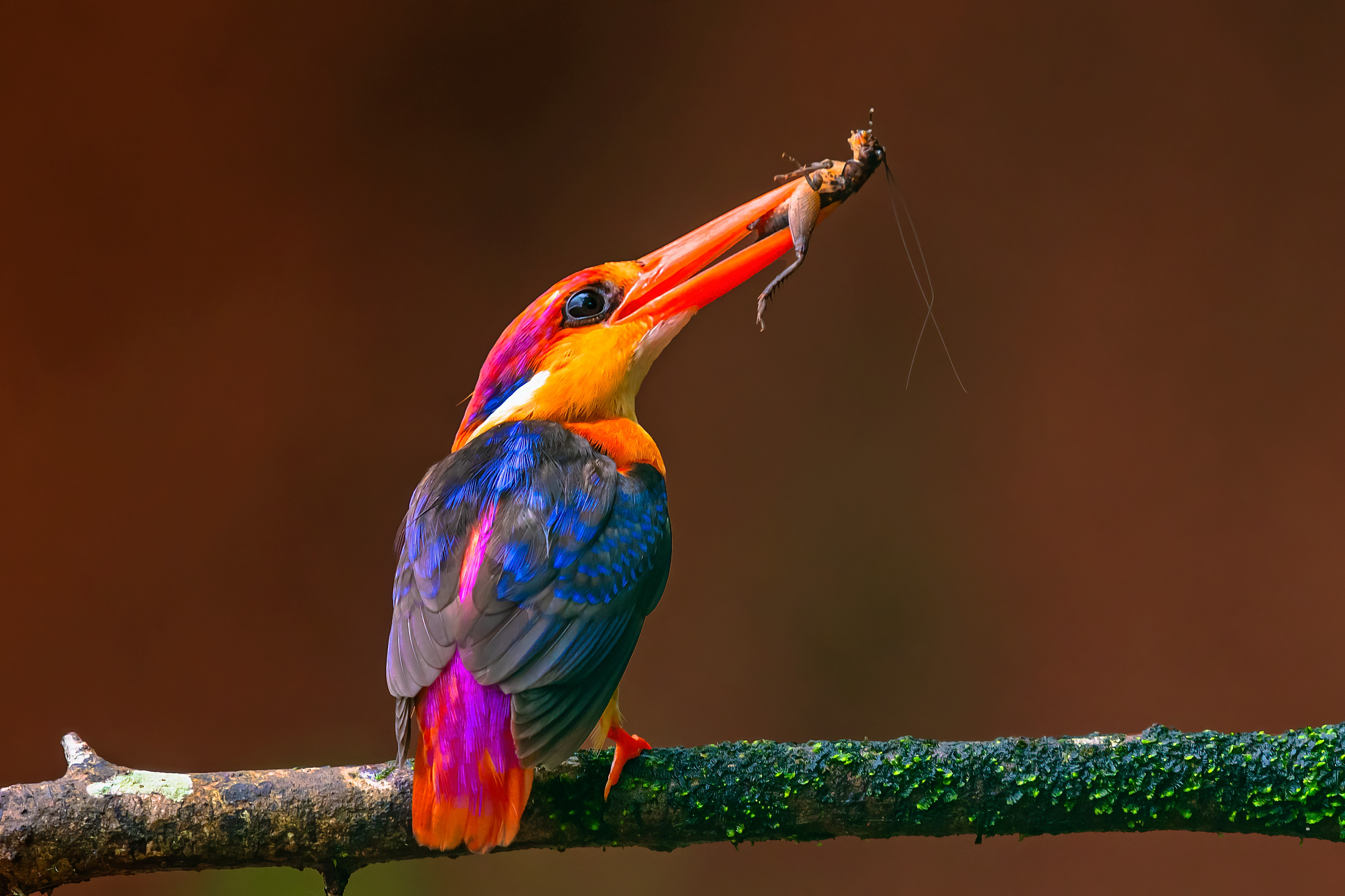
Black-backed dwarf kingfisher in Abloli, Ratnagiri, Maharashtra, India.

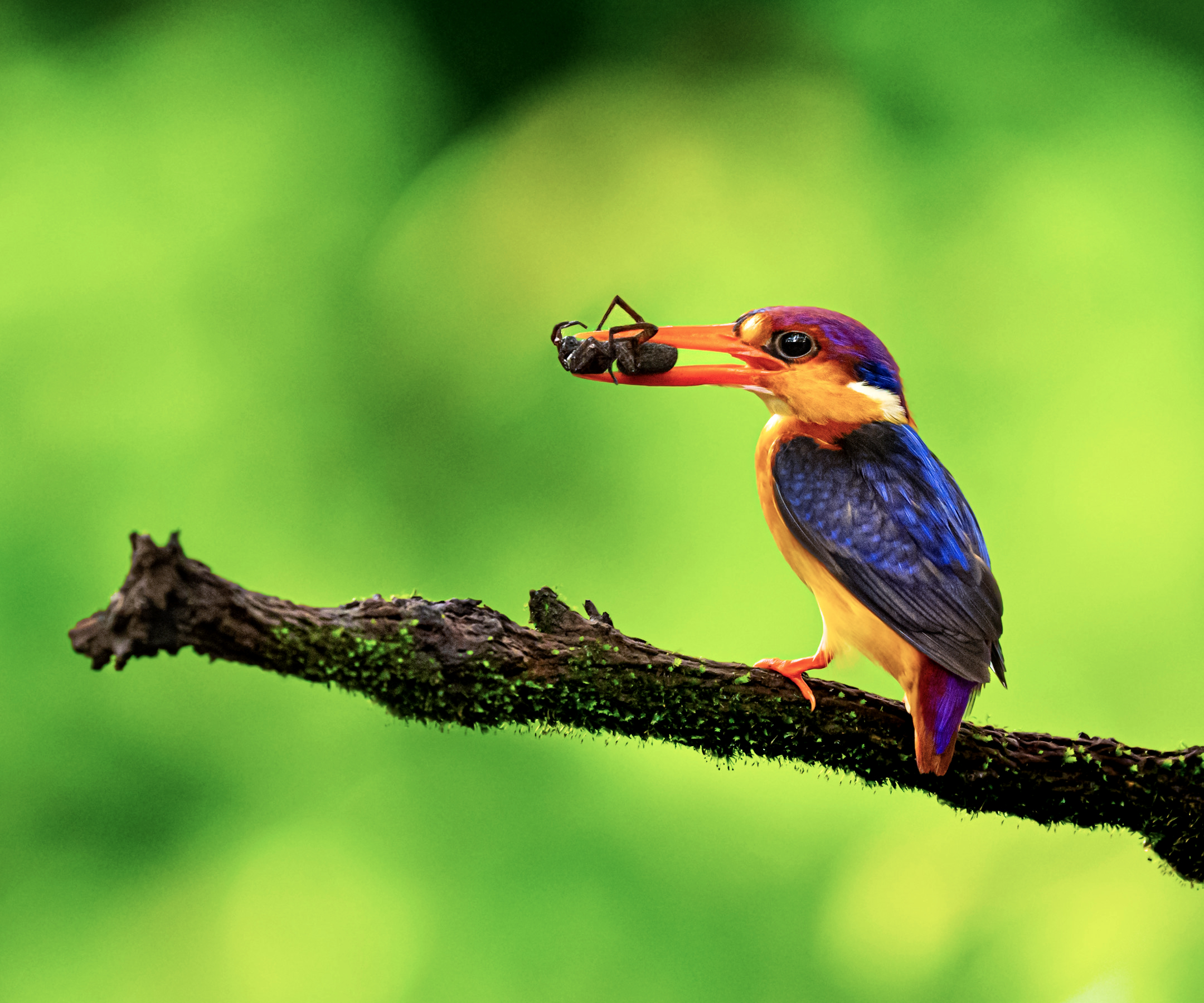
An oriental dwarf kingfisher perches on a moss-covered branch.

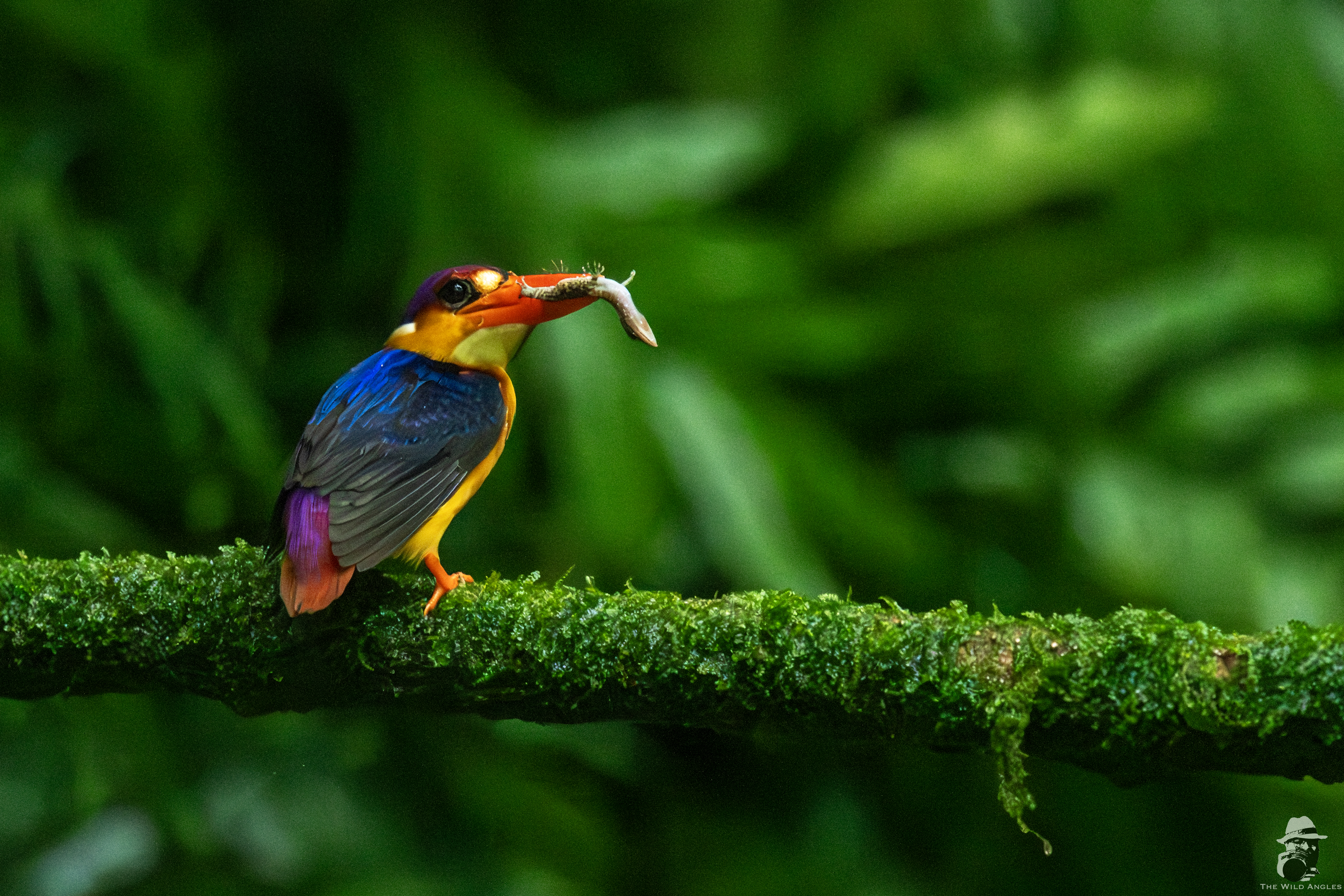
Bringing in feed for the young ones in the nest.

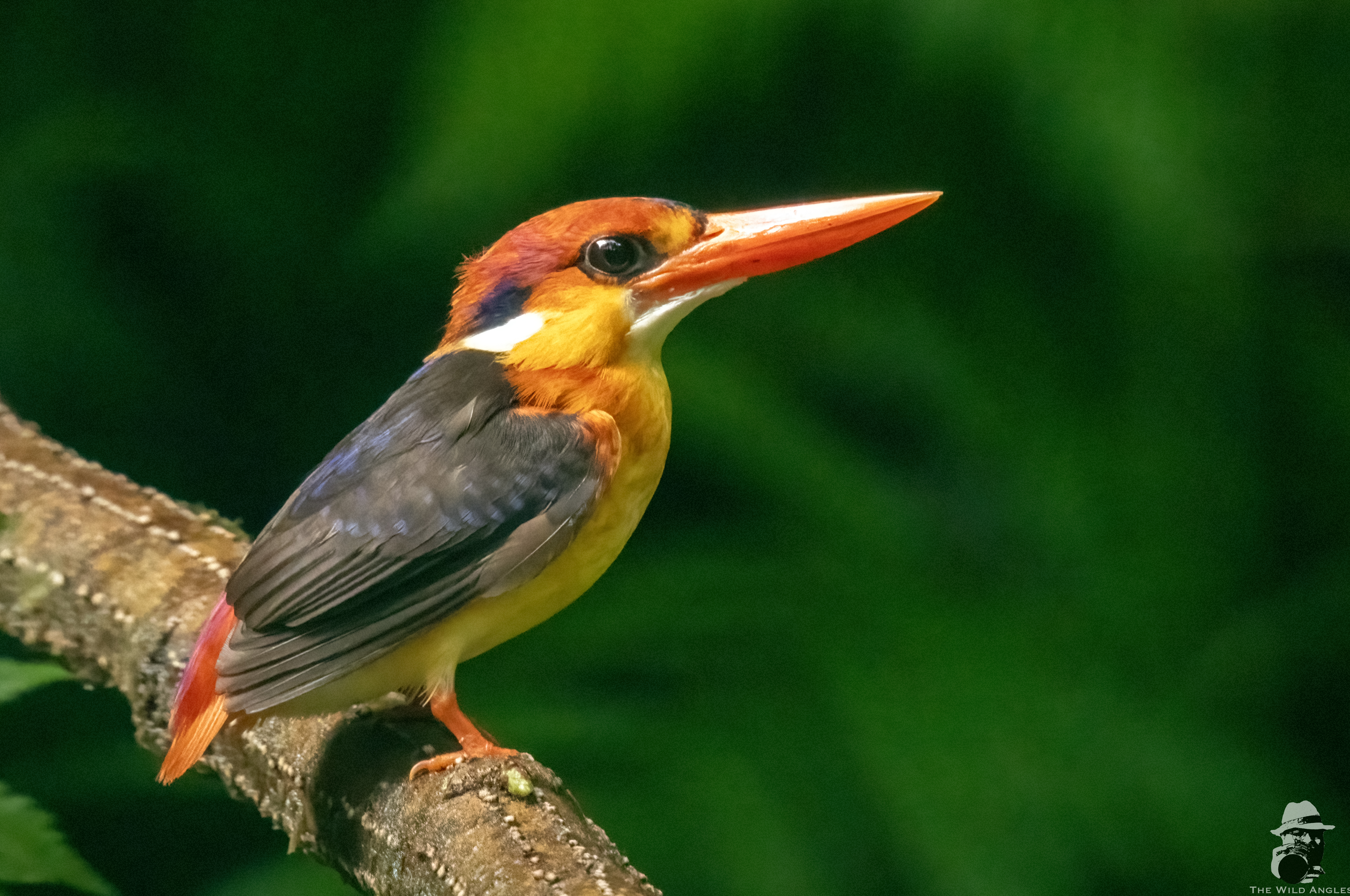
Adult from the last breeding season in August 2024 at Goa

The black-backed dwarf kingfisher (Ceyx erithaca), also known as the three-toed kingfisher, is a pocket-sized bird in the family Alcedinidae. It was formerly considered as conspecific with the rufous-backed dwarf kingfisher and together the species complex was known by the English name "oriental dwarf kingfisher".

This tropical kingfisher is a partial migrant that is endemic to parts of the Indian Subcontinent and Mainland Southeast Asia. It resides in lowland forests, typically near streams or ponds, where it feeds upon insects, spiders, worms, crabs, fish, frogs, and lizards. It is easily distinguishable from other birds in its range due to its red bill, yellow-orange underparts, lilac-rufous upperparts, and blue-black back.

== Taxonomy and systematics ==
The black-backed kingfisher was formally described in 1758 by the Swedish naturalist Carl Linnaeus in the tenth edition of his Systema Naturae. He placed it with the other kingfishers in the genus Alcedo and coined the binomial name Alcedo erithaca. The specific epithet is from Latin erithacus meaning "robin" and hence "red-breasted". Linnaeus based his account on "The small kingfisher from Bengall" that had been described and illustrated in 1738 by the English naturalist Eleazar Albin in his book A Natural History of Birds. The black-backed kingfisher is now one of 23 small kingfishers placed in the genus Ceyx that was introduced in 1799 by the French naturalist Bernard Germain de Lacépède. The binomial name has sometimes been written as Ceyx erithacus. This is incorrect as the specific epithet is a noun and its ending does not change. Under the rules of the International Commission on Zoological Nomenclature the correct spelling is Ceyx erithaca.

The rufous-backed dwarf kingfisher (Ceyx rufidorsa) was formerly considered to be a colour morph of the black-backed dwarf kingfisher. The combined species were known as the "oriental dwarf kingfisher". Molecular genetic studies have shown that Ceyx rufidorsa is a distinct taxon and that the polymorphism is the result of ancient introgression in which some genes from Ceyx erithaca were transferred to Ceyx rufidorsa around 140,000 years ago.

Two subspecies are recognised:

- C. e. erithaca (Linnaeus, 1758) – northeast India, Myanmar, Thailand, Indochina, southeast China, Indochina and Thailand south to north Malay Peninsula. Disjunctly in southwest India and Sri Lanka. In non-breeding season some birds migrate to south Malay Peninsula and Sumatra.
- C. e. macrocarus Oberholser, 1917 – Andaman and Nicobar Islands

Kingfishers (Alcedinidae) are a family of approximately 118 species belonging to the pantropical avian order Coraciiformes. Members of this family range in size from the 9g African dwarf kingfisher (Ceyx lecontei) to the 500g laughing kookaburra (Dacelo novaeguinea). Despite their name, members of this family are not all piscivorous and many are found far from water and are predators to terrestrial invertebrates and small vertebrates. This family is largely tropical, however, there are a few species which have adapted to temperate regions.

This family can be further divided into the three subfamilies: Halcyoninae, Cerylinae, and Alcedinidae (the pygmy kingfishers). The subfamily Alcedinidae is distributed across tropical Africa and Asia, south into northern Australia and Melanesia, and north into Europe and temperate Asia. As implied by their name, pygmy kingfishers are relatively tiny compared to other kingfishers. Other than their size, kingfishers in this subfamily are also characterized by their bright colours. Their habitats range from dense forest to woodland-savannah, and they can also be found along waterways in both wooded and open terrain.

Within the Alcedinidae subfamily is the genus Ceyx. Species in this genus are characterized by their terrestrial habitats, their diet which consists mostly of insects, their dorso-ventrally flattened orange bills and their more rufous upperparts. Within this genus, molecular data indicates that C. erithaca forms a well-supported clade of three-toed pygmy kingfishers that includes C. melanurus, C. lepidus, C. argentatus and C. cyanopectus.

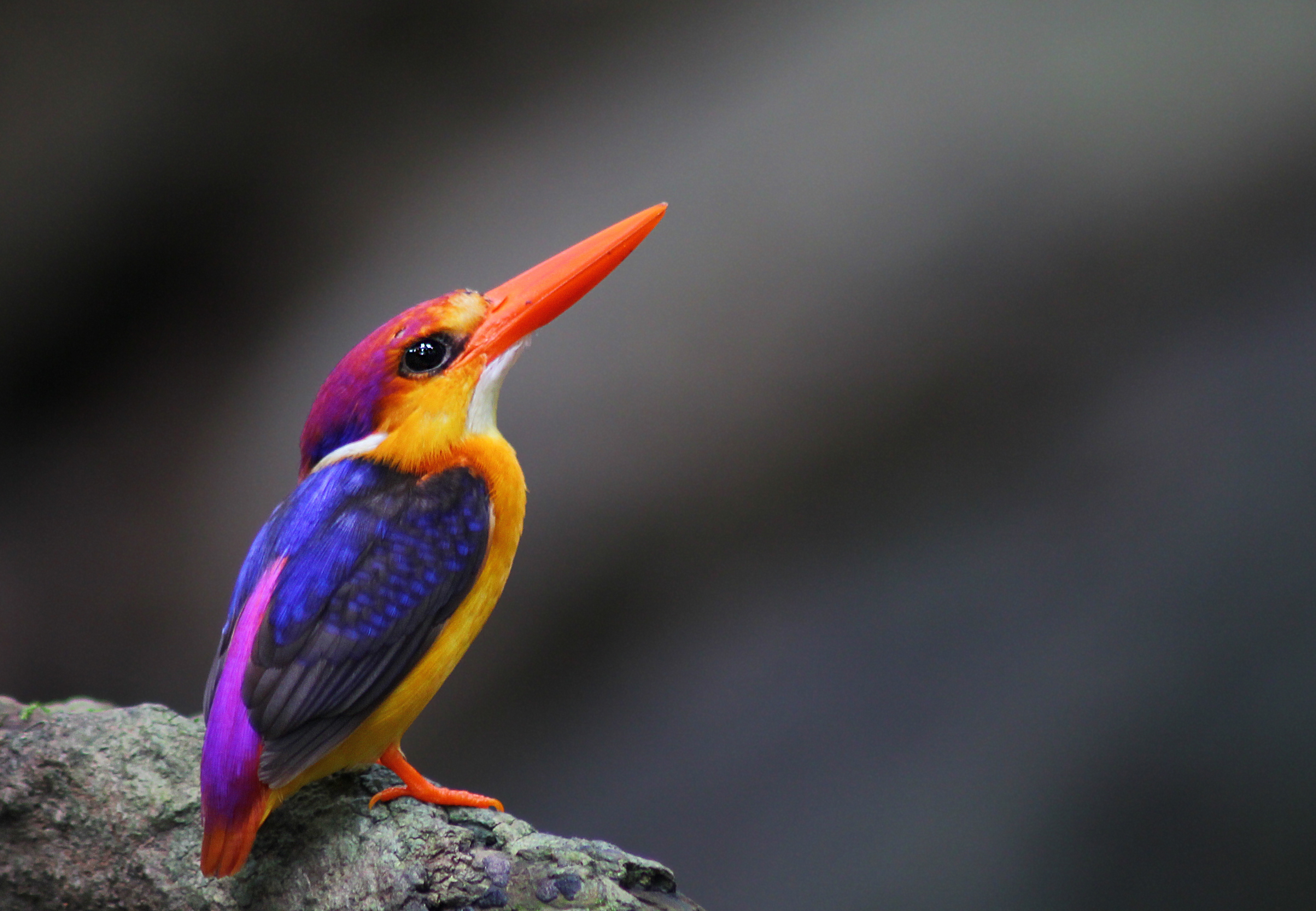
In Sanjay Gandhi National Park, Mumbai, India

== Description ==
The black-backed dwarf kingfisher is one of the smallest known kingfisher species. It is only slightly larger than a medium-sized hummingbird and measures 12.5–14 cm (4.9–5.5 in) in length (including bill and tail). Females typically weigh 14-16g and males 14-21.5g, making the males slightly larger. The two sexes are otherwise alike and sexual dimorphism is not present. Both males and females have a black spot on the forehead; blue and white patches on the side of the neck; a lilac-rufous crown, rump, and tail; a dark blue back and wings; a white chin and throat; pale yellow-orange underparts; a dark brown iris; and red legs, feet, and bill. Juveniles are duller and have less lilac colouring; a white chin, throat and belly; yellow-orange bill with pale tip; and blue scapulars and wing-coverts. This species of kingfisher has three toes, explaining why it is sometimes called the three-toed kingfisher, however, there are other kingfishers which also have three toes. The toe-count in these kingfisher species does not appear to be adaptive. The vocalization is a high pitched, shrill "tsriet-tsriet" or soft "tjie-tjie-tjie" in flight.

== Distribution and habitat ==
The black-backed dwarf kingfisher is a forest and wetland-dwelling species that is endemic to parts of the Indian subcontinent and Mainland Southeast Asia. The breeding range includes eastern Bangladesh, northeastern India, Myanmar, the extreme south of China, Laos, Cambodia and Thailand. There is a disjunct population in the Western Ghats of western India and in Sri Lanka. During winter some birds migrate south to the Malay Peninsula and Sumatra.

It is most commonly found in deciduous and evergreen primary and secondary forests, but also in alluvial forests, mangroves, overgrown rubber gardens, or in dense aggregations of palms, bamboos, or shrubs. They tend to keep near forest streams and ponds, but their nests are often well away from water. They keep low to the ground and are known to perch and fly within 1-2m of the forest floor. Their preferred habitat is densely shaded forest lowlands near small streams or ponds. The lowlands they are present in typically do not exceed 1000-1300m in elevation.

=== Migration ===
The northern populations winter in the southern parts of the breeding range and the species is defined as a partial migrant. They often migrate south towards peninsular Malaysia from August to September and return north in March. Large numbers of night-flying migrants are reported from August to December at Maxwell's Hill and at Fraser's Hill in Malaysia, as well as at light stations on many islands up to 60 km (37 mi) off the western coast. It is still uncertain whether the most northerly parts of the species' range are vacated during the winter. The black-backed dwarf kingfisher is also a breeding visitor across much of the range in India, but its movements here are still uncertain.

== Behaviour and ecology ==
=== Breeding ===
Egg laying occurs from July to September in southwest India, February to July in Sri Lanka, April to May in northeast India, March to July in peninsular Malaysia, March in Sumatra, and from December to May in Java. Nests are built in stream banks, road cuttings, terrestrial termitariums, or in soil near roots of a fallen tree, often well away from water. Together, the male and female excavate a horizontal tunnel that is 15–100 cm (5.9–39.4 in) long, 3.8–4.5 cm (1.5–1.8 in) in diameter, and ends in an unlined egg chamber. One pair dug 25 cm (9.8 in) of their burrow, in sand, in about 40 minutes. The unlined chamber is 10–15 cm (3.9–5.9 in) wide and 5–7 cm (2.0–2.8 in) high. Both the tunnel and egg chamber are inclined upwards, which is thought to minimize water entry into the chamber and to help the flow of waste material out of the nest. The generation time is approximately 4.2 years. A typical clutch size is 3-7 eggs, averaging to around 5 eggs per clutch. The eggs are laid in the morning with a one day interval in between. Incubation begins after the final egg is laid and the incubation period lasts 17–18 days. Both the male and female incubate the eggs, however, the female has a larger role in the incubation period because she is responsible for incubating the eggs at night. The fledging period is 18–20 days and chicks typically fledge out in the morning.

=== Food and feeding ===
Their diet consists primarily of insects, including mantises (Mantodea), grasshoppers (Orthoptera), flies (Diptera), water beetles (Dytiscidae), winged ants (Formicidae), mayflies (Ephemeroptera); but also includes spiders; worms (Oligochaeta); and small crabs, fish, frogs and lizards.

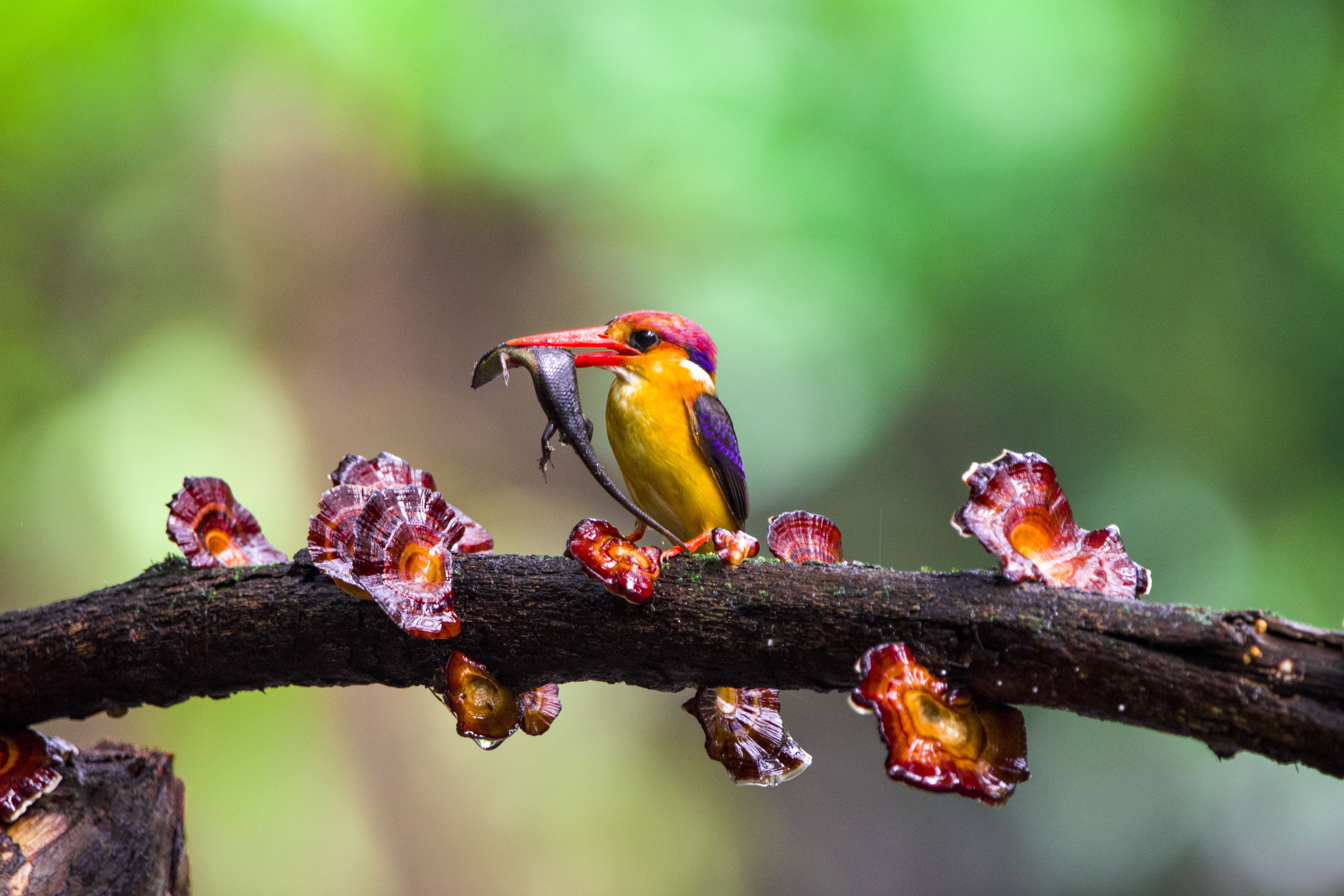
Black-backed dwarf kingfisher with skink kill

Black-backed dwarf kingfishers forage solitarily and perch in low vegetation or on rocks before flying out to capture prey from the ground or from among foliage. They can take spiders from their webs and catch insects in flight. They can also dive into water for prey at or just below the surface, without submerging themselves. Larger prey are typically brought back to a perch, where the bird will strike it repeatedly with its beak before swallowing.

== Conservation status and threats ==
C. erithaca is classified as a "Near threatened species" under the IUCN Red List and it is not globally threatened. The population trend, however, is decreasing and the number of mature individuals is unknown. It is widely distributed, but in the northern parts of the range, it is often reported as scarce. This scarcity could be due to the species being overlooked, and/or a result of its movement patterns. There are conservation sites identified over the species' entire range.

=== Threats ===
The main threat being faced by the black-backed dwarf kingfisher is the clearing of their forest habitat. Population levels are likely to decrease due to the continued loss of critical breeding habitats due to human activities.

Black-backed dwarf kingfishers may also face other threats common to kingfishers and other migrating bird species, such as:

- Pollution
- Drying of ponds and streams
- Public dislike for kingfishers (fishermen)/illegal human persecution
- Electric lines
- Climate-induced changes in timing of migration and breeding
- Collisions with artificial obstacles, like buildings, in their flight path
- Exhaustion, starvation and dehydration
- Erosion of stream banks
