= Bharadkhol =

Village in Maharashtra

- village
- Location in Maharashtra, India Bharadkhol (India)
- Coordinates: 18.16827°N 72.99034°E
- Country: India
- State: Maharashtra
- District: Raigad

Languages
  - Official: Marathi
- Time zone: UTC+5:30 (IST)
- PIN: 402404
- Nearest city: Raigad

Bharadkhol is a coastal village in the Shrivardhan Taluk in Raigad District in Maharashtra State, India. It is close to popular beach town of Diveagar known for its pristine beach.
