= Harihareshwar =

- Town
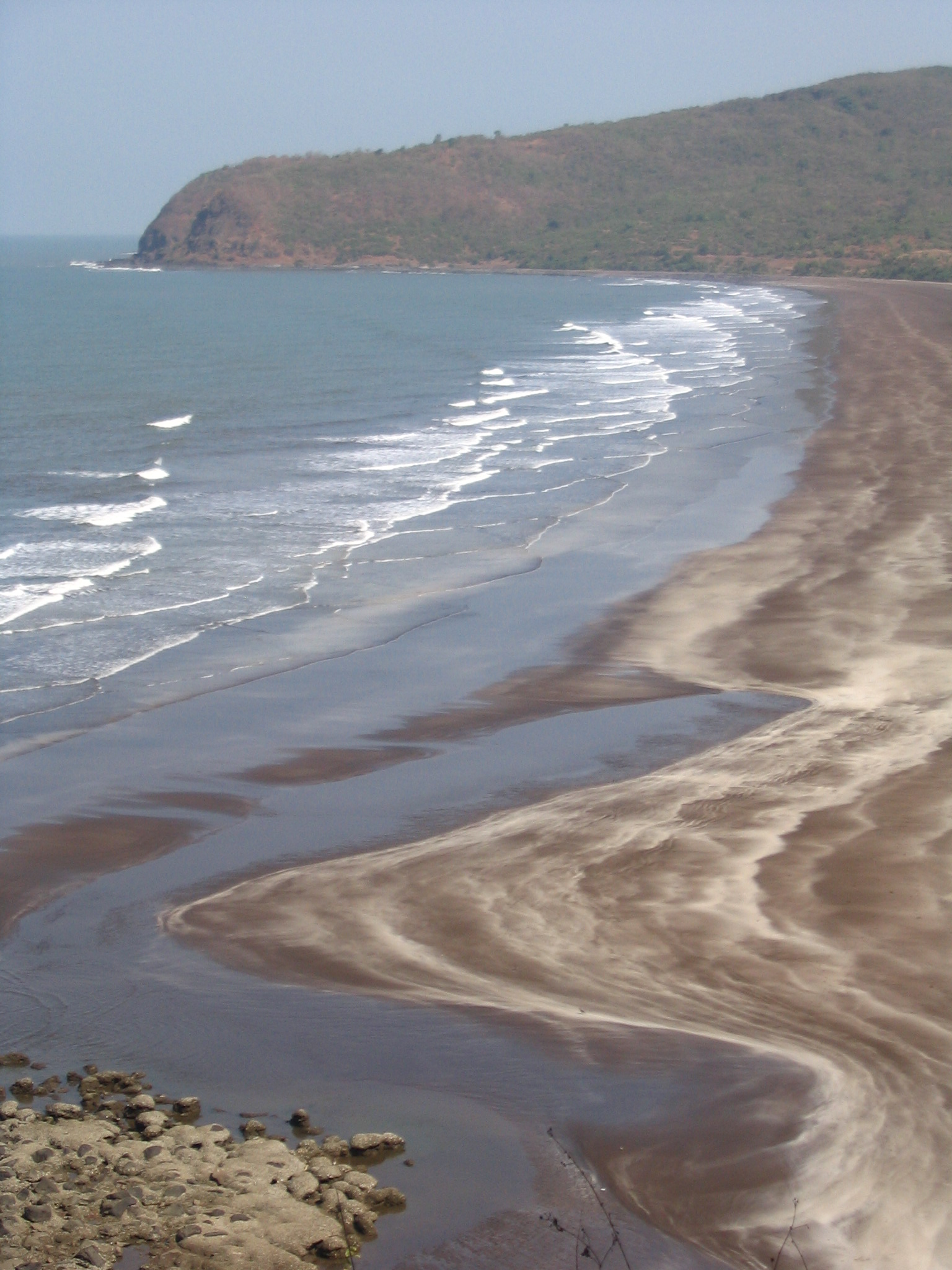
- A view of Harihareshwar beach

- Location of Harihareshwar in Maharashtra Harihareshwar (India)
- Coordinates: 17.995°N 73.025°E
- Country: India
- State: Maharashtra
- District: Raigad
- Taluka: Shrivardhan
- Elevation: 0 m (0 ft)
- Time zone: UTC+5:30 (IST)
- PIN: 402110
- Vehicle registration: MH-05
- Climate: Cwb

Harihareshwar is a town in Raigad district, in Maharashtra, India. It is surrounded by three hills named Harihareshwar, Harshinachal and Pushpadri. The river Savitri enters the Arabian Sea from the town of Harihareshwar. Towards the north of the town is the temple of Lord Harihareshwar, said to have been blessed by Lord Shiva. Hence Harihareshwar is often referred to as Dev-ghar or "house of God". It is also known as Dakshin Kashi.

Besides a major pilgrimage center, Harihareshwar is a popular beach resort with two beaches, one to the north and the other to the south of the temple. Maharashtra Tourism Development Corporation has a resort on the south beach. Harihareshwar, along with Shrivardhan and Diveagar Beach forms a popular weekend beach destination from Pune (190 km) and Mumbai (210 km).

The Kalbhairav Jayanti Utsav (Festival on Birthday of Deity Kalbhairav) was initiated by Mr. Yashawant Balawant Nagle who was Sardar of Queen of Janjira Administering Harihareshwar village. He donated quite a large part of his property for funding the Temple management.

== Harihareshwar Temple ==
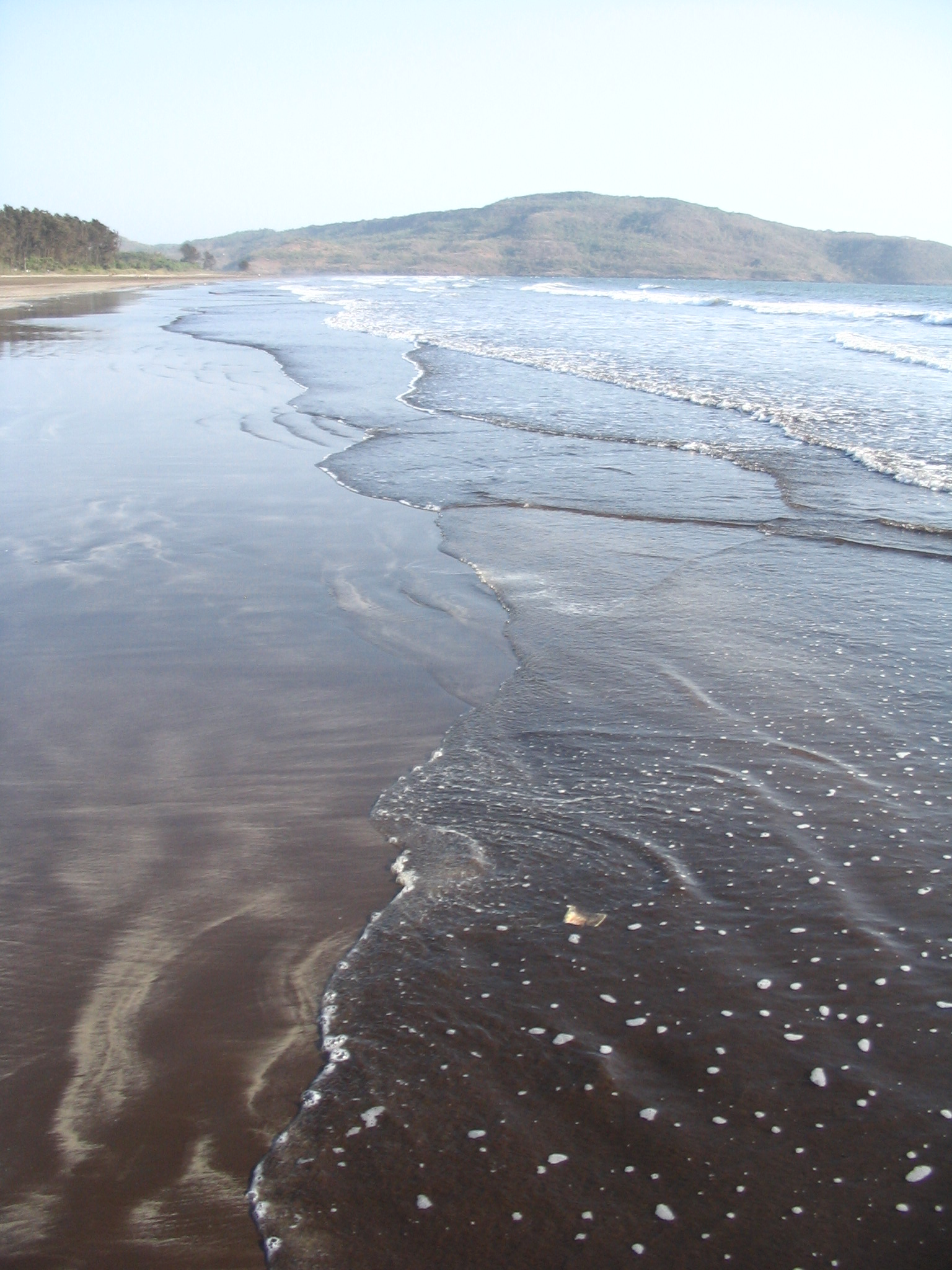
Harihareshwar south beach

Harihareshwar Temple complex has two adjacent temples. The smaller Kalbhairav temple is expected to be visited first, before entering the main Harihareshwar temple housing an ancient Shiva Linga. A Pradakshina route goes around the temple, along the sea shore. It is not advisable to go on this route during high tide.

== Harihareshwar’s ambience ==
Harihareshwar is renowned tourist spot in Konkan for its temples and beaches. Moreover, it is said as Devbhumi or Temple Town. Harihareshwar alone have two beaches − one, straight beach about 2.4 km long in front of Harihareshwar Temple, and the other beach is about 2 km in an L shape just in front of MTDC Resort. Harihareshwar is an evergreen place and one may visit it in any season. It is placed in the heart of nature and bounded with Sahyadri's hills. One can spend his three or four days of holiday easily. There is no problem staying in Harihareshwar as there are MTDC (a Governmental body) and few private resorts, also some Bed and Breakfasts that provide stays in homes. Harihareshwar Beach is a well set up beach.
