= Yashwantrao Thorat =

Military commander in 18th-century India (died 1979)

- Senakhaskhel
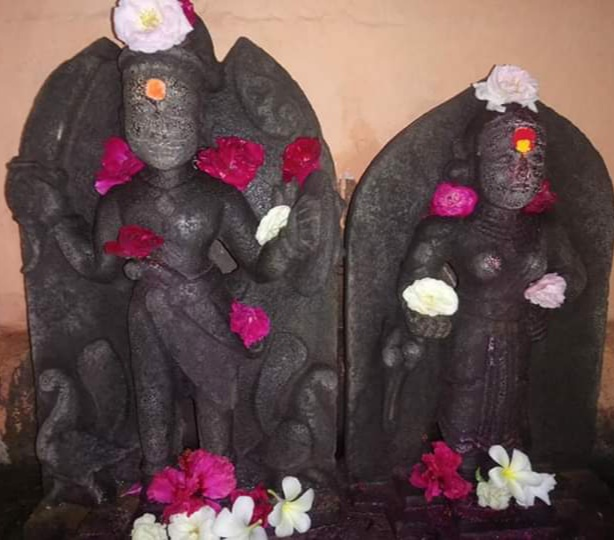
- Statues in samadhi mandir (memorial commemorating the dead) of Yashwantrao Thorat and his wife near Panhala fort.

Senakhaskhel to the Chhatrapati Sambhaji II of the Kolhapur
- Reign: 1717 - 1719
- Born: unknown
- Died: 1719; Apti, Panhala
- Spouse: Godabai
- House: Thorat
- Father: Subhanji
- Mother: Saibai
- Religion: Hindu

Yashwantrao Thorat or Yesaji (Marathi : यशवंतराव थोरात or येसाजी) was a military commander and the main supporter of Sambhaji II of Kolhapur from 1717 to 1719. Before 1717, he served Shahu for a brief period. After the battle of Vadgaon he changed sides and supported Sambhaji II. He had the title of 'Senakhaskhel'. He had jagir in the territory of Warana. He successfully launched many campaign against Shahu with the help of Udaji Chavan. Sambhaji II gave him the area of 9 lakh income as saranjam in Bijapur territory. In 1719, he died in the Battle of Panhala against Balaji Vishwanath. After his death his wife Godabai perform Sati.

== Campaign against Mughal commander Padulla Khan ==
The territory of Karad and Miraj was under the Mughal commander Padulla Khan until 1717. In 1717, Yashwantrao joined Shahu because there were misunderstandings between Yashwantrao and Sambhaji II. At that time Shahu wanted to establish his control in Karad and Miraj territory. So Shahu decided to launch a campaign against Padullakhan in 1717. Yashwantrao joined this campaign with his troops. Shahu's forces attacked on military camp of Padulla Khan in Karad. The army of Padulla Khan was dispersed by the sudden attack. But after a while, he also counterattacked. At the end of the battle Padulla Khan was defeated and he fled to Islampur. This battle is known as 'Battle of Karad'. After the battle of Karad Shahu was successful to establish his rule in Karad and Miraj territory.

== Sambhaji's Side ==
In 1717 Yashwantrao left Shahu and join Sambhaji II due to political reason. Sambhaji welcome him with the title of Senakhaskhel and give him the area of 9 lakh income as jagir in the Bijapur territory.

== Battle of Panhala ==
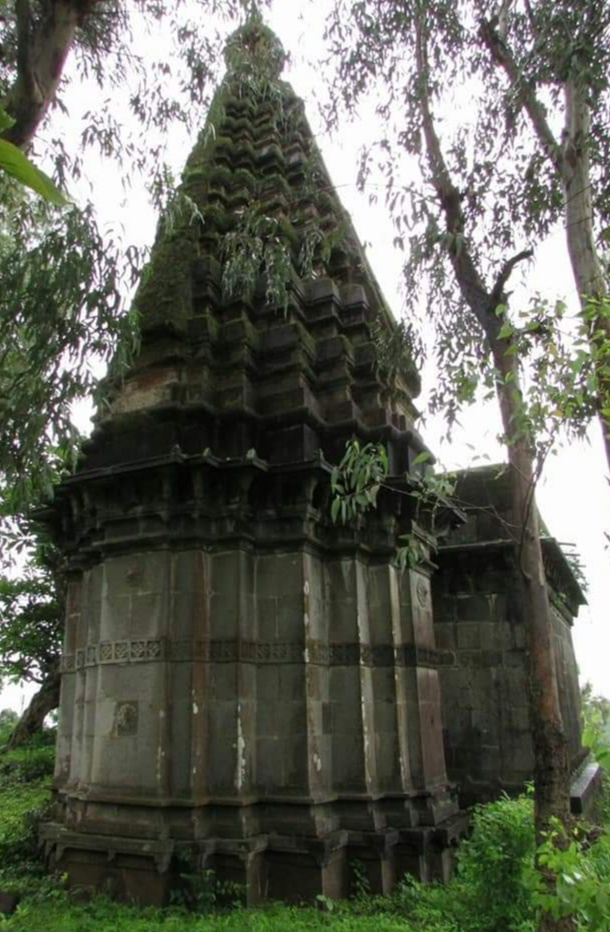
Samadhi of Yashwantrao Thorat near Panhala fort

When Shahu ordered Balaji Vishwanath to marched against Sambhaji II in 1719 due to Sambhaji's aggression in his territory. Balaji first marched towards Ashta and captured it. The Ashta was under Yashwantrao's control. At that time Yashwantrao was in Bijapur territory. When he know about Balaji he marched towards him. The army of Balaji and Yashwantrao came in front of each other near Apti. At last the battle of Panhala was fought between Balaji and Yashwantrao near fort of Panhala. In the battle Yashwantrao was injured by a spear and after a while he died in it. Balaji's troops retreat after a month. After the death of Yashwantrao in the battle, his wife Godabai perform 'Sati'. Sambhaji II made a samadhi mandir of Yashwantrao and his wife near the battle field of Panhala.
