= Balaji Vishwanath =

Peshwa of the Maratha Empire from 1713 to 1720

Shrimant Peshwa Balaji Vishwanath
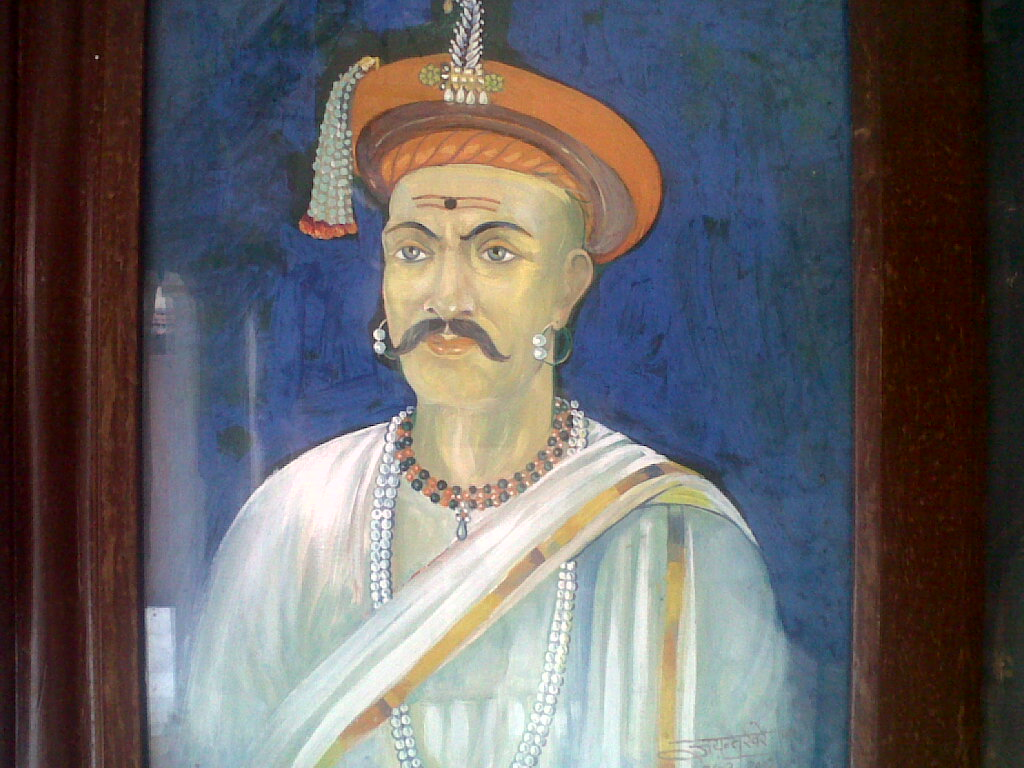
- Portrait of Balaji Vishwanath

6th Peshwa of the Maratha Empire
- In office 16 November 1713 – 12 April 1720
- Monarch: Shahu I
- Preceded by: Parshuram Pant Pratinidhi
- Succeeded by: Baji Rao I

Personal details
- Born: Balaji Vishwanath Bhat; 1 January 1662 Shrivardhan, Bijapur Sultanate (modern day Maharashtra, India)
- Died: 12 April 1720 (aged 58) Saswad, Maratha Empire (modern day Maharashtra, India)
- Spouse: Radhabai
- Children: Baji Rao I Chimaji Appa; Bhiubai Joshi; Anubai Ghorpade; Bhikaji; Ranoji
- Parents: Vishwanath Pant Bhat (Also known as Parshuram) (father); Unknown (mother)

Balaji Vishwanath Bhat (1 January 1662 – 12 April 1720) was the first of a series of hereditary Peshwas hailing from the Bhat family who gained effective control of the Maratha Confederacy and other Mughal vassals during the early 18th century. Balaji Vishwanath assisted a young Maratha king Shahu to consolidate his grip on a kingdom that had been racked by civil war and persistently intruded on by the Mughals under Aurangzeb.

== Early life and career ==
Balaji Vishwanath Bhat was born into a Marathi Konkanastha Chitpavan Brahmin family. The family hailed from the coastal Konkan region of present-day Maharashtra and were the hereditary Deshmukh for Shrivardhan under the Siddi of Janjira. According to the Purandare daftar, Balaji Vishwanath arrived in the Desh from Konkan sometime before 1692 CE. He initially worked under Ambajipant Purandare of Saswad, followed by Ramchandrapant Amatya and Shankrajipant Sachiv. From June 1699 to 1702, he served as the Sar-subhedar or head-administrator at Pune and from 1703 to 1707 as Sarsubhedar of Daulatabad. In 1703, Balaji Vishwanath first worked with Senapati Dhanaji Jadhav during the siege of Sinhagad. He subsequently led military expeditions around Dindori (near Daulatabad) in 1705, and into Gujarat in 1707. For his previous work, Balaji Vishwanath was appointed Senakarte or the maker of armies in 1708, before being awarded the position of Peshwa in 1713 CE

== Role during Maratha Civil War ==
Since the death of Shivaji, his two sons Sambhaji and Rajaram continued the Maratha war against the Mughal Empire. Aurangzeb entered the Deccan in 1686, hoping to put an end to the fledgling Maratha state. Aurangzeb spent the next 27 years in the Deccan in ceaseless warfare against the Marathas. Despite the cruel executions of Sambhaji and early death of Rajaram, Rajaram's widow Tarabai continued the resistance while Sambhaji's son Shahu was captured at a very young age and held captive of the Mughals. Aurangzeb died at Ahmednagar in 1707 at the age of eighty-eight, with the Mughal armies exhausted and the treasury empty. The ensuing war of succession in the Mughal Empire resulted in accession of the aged Prince Mu'azzam, who ascended the Mughal throne under the title of Bahadur Shah.

In the intrigues following the death of Aurangzeb, the Mughal governor of the Deccan released Shahu from captivity, hoping to keep the Marathas locked in an internecine struggle between the partisans of Shahu, and Tarabai, the widow of Rajaram who governed in the name of her son Shivaji and denounced Shahu as an impostor substituted by the Mughals for the son of Sambhaji.

Tarabai sent the Maratha Senapati Dhanaji Jadhav to attack Shahu. Contrary to popular belief, the person sent by Dhanaji to gauge whether Shahu was an imposter was Khando Ballal Chitnis, who was in the service of Dhanaji at the time.

After the death of Dhanaji Jadhav in June 1708, Shahu appointed Dhanaji's son Chandrasen Jadhav as Senapati. However, due to his inclination towards Tarabai, Chandrasen began acting against Shahu. In 1711, due to the actions of a soldier working under Balaji, an altercation occurred between Chandrasen Jadhav and Balaji Vishwanath which prompted to Shahu to side with the latter. This ultimately led to Chandrasen's complete defection, after which the post of Senapati was transferred to his half-brother, Santaji.

Balaji next turned against Tarabai and her own armory of intrigue. The fall of Tarabai at Kolhapur in 1712 was the outcome of a conspiracy hatched by Balaji Vishwanath in connivance with the disgruntled elements of Tarabai's court. Balaji Vishwanath induced Rajaram's other widow, Rajasbai to conduct a coup against Shivaji II, the son of Tarabai and install her own son, Sambhaji II, on the throne of Kolhapur. This brought the ruling house of Kolhapur under protection and subordination of Shahu at that time.

== Appointment as Peshwa ==
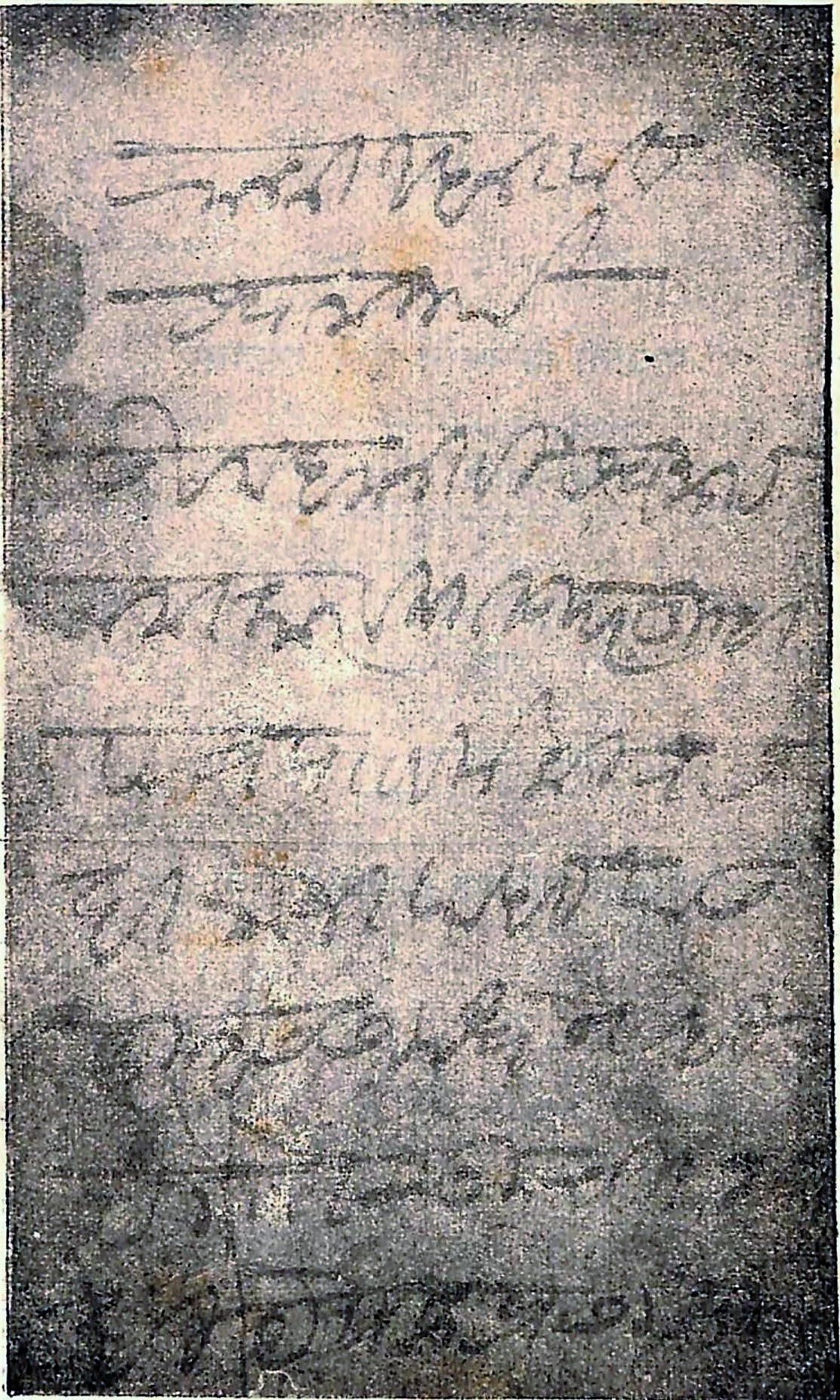
Handwritten letter of Balaji Vishwanath

Next Shahu turned to subdue the Angre clan. Tukoji Angre had commanded Chattrapati Shivaji's navy, and was succeeded in 1690 by his son Kanhoji Angre. Kanhoji received from Tarabai the title of "Sarkhel" Admiral of the Maratha fleet. The conflict between Tarabai and Shahu offered Kanhoji an opportunity to effectively free himself of the suzerainty of either. He captured the major trading center of Kalyan and the neighboring forts of Rajmachi and Lohgad. Shahu sent a large force under his Peshwa or Prime Minister, Bahiroji Pingale. Kanhoji defeated Pingale and imprisoned him at Lohagad, and started to advance towards Shahu's capital Satara. Shahu commanded Balaji again to raise another army to subdue Kanhoji. Balaji preferred the path of negotiation and was appointed as Shahu's plenipotentiary to negotiate with the admiral. Balaji and Kanhoji met at Lonavala. The newly appointed Peshwa appealed to the old sailor's patriotism for the Maratha cause. Angre agreed to become the Sarkhel (admiral) of Shahu's navy with control of the Konkan. Balaji and Angre then jointly attacked the Muslim Siddis of Janjira. Their combined forces captured most of the Konkan coast, including Balaji's birthplace of Shrivardhan, which became part of the Angre fiefdom. Delighted with Balaji's success, Shahu dismissed Bahiroji Pingale and appointed Balaji Vishwanath as Peshwa on 16 November 1713.

== Northward expansion ==
There existed a power vacuum in the Mughal Empire, caused by the death of Aurangzeb in 1707, and that of his successor Bahadur Shah, leading to continual internecine conflict within the imperial family and the leading Mughal grandees. Farrukhsiyar came to the throne in 1713 with the help of the two powerful nobles, Sayyid Hussain Ali Khan and Sayyid Abdullah Khan. Claiming descent from the Islamic prophet, Muhammad, the Sayyid Brothers had turned king-makers in the Mughal court. Soon after, differences arose between them and the Emperor Farruksiyar. And while the Mughals were intriguing in the civil war between the factions of Shahu and Tarabai, the Marathas themselves became a major factor in the quarrels between the Emperor and the Sayyids. To rid himself of the tutelage of the Sayyids in 1718, Farrukhsiyar dispatched Sayyid Hussain Ali Khan as Viceroy of the Deccan with orders to restore Mughal authority over the south. Hussain Ali Khan found himself harried by the Marathas who resorted to their traditional guerilla tactics. Unable to defeat the Marathas in a pitched battle and weary of chasing after constantly marauding Maratha horsemen, Hussain Ali Khan sought to make peace with the Marathas.

In July 1718, Balaji negotiated a Maratha-Mughal treaty with Hussain Ali Khan, demanding the Maratha right of "Chauth" (literally: 1/4th of revenues) and "Sardeshmukhi" (an additional 10% of revenues) of the old Mughal provinces of the Deccan. To this Balaji Vishwanath added the demand of Chauth and Sardeshmukhi over the rich provinces of Gujarat and Malwa, and the restoration of Chattrapati Shivaji's conquests in Karnataka, in return for which Balaji promised that Shahu would acknowledge the nominal overlordship of the Mughal Emperor, and the Marathas would provide a force of 15,000 armed horsemen to the Mughal Empire.To these demands, Sayyid Hussain Ali Khan readily agreed, with a view to utilize the Maratha soldiers to their advantage in their struggle with the Emperor. Farrukhsiyar refused to ratify this treaty, and sought to depose and murder the Sayyids. The plot was betrayed to Sayyid Abdullah Khan who was in Delhi, who succeeded in neutralizing other powerful Mughal nobles like Asaf Jah I (also known as Chin Qilich Khan and Nizam-ul-Mulk) and Sarbuland Khan (governor of Patna) with promises of rich governorships of Malwa and Kabul respectively. In September 1718, accompanied by Balaji Vishwanath, and supported by (now) sixteen thousand strong Maratha horsemen commanded by Parsoji Bhosale, Hussain Ali Khan arrived in Delhi. Most of Farrukhsiyar's supporters fled but the Emperor's partisans resisted but were overcome at the cost of two thousand Maratha soldiers.

Farrukhsiyar was dethroned, blinded and imprisoned by the Sayyid's, who substituted in his place a more pliable puppet, Rafi-ul-darjat in February 1719. This hapless prince was dying of tuberculosis and was in turn replaced after a reign of only three months by his older brother Rafi Ud-Daulah.) Rafi-ul-Darjat duly ratified the Maratha treaty. Shahu and his successors were recognized by the Mughal Emperors as the rightful heirs to Chattrapati Shivaji.

== Conflict with Sambhaji II ==
Shahu I wanted to establish his rule in the Northern part of Kolhapur territory. After he defeated Shivaji II of Kolhapur in 1714, Sambhaji II son of Rajasbai became the Chhatrapati of Kolhapur. He ruled his territory with the advice of the Ramchandra Pant Amatya. In 1716, Ramchandra Pant died in Panhala. Now, Sambhaji began to raid the territory of Shahu with the help of Udaji Chavan and Yashwantrao Thorat. The Shirol was under Chavan and the Ashta, Yelvi, Walwa and the jagir in Warana valleys was under Yashwantrao.

=== Battle of Panhala ===
After Balaji Vishwanath returned from Delhi with imperial sanads, he decided to march against Sambhaji. He captured Ashta, Yelvi and other villages in the Warana valley, and went on to attack Panhala. At that time Yashwantrao Thorat was in Bijapur territory. He got the news that Balaji Vishwanath captured his jagir in Warana valley and went to attack on Panhala fort. He immediately took some troops with him and went towards Panhala fort. The forces of Peshwa Balaji and Yashwantrao came in front of each other near Panhala fort. This battle was fought in 1719. Yashwantrao Thorat was defeated and killed in the battle. This battle is known as 'Battle of Panhala'.

== Personal life ==
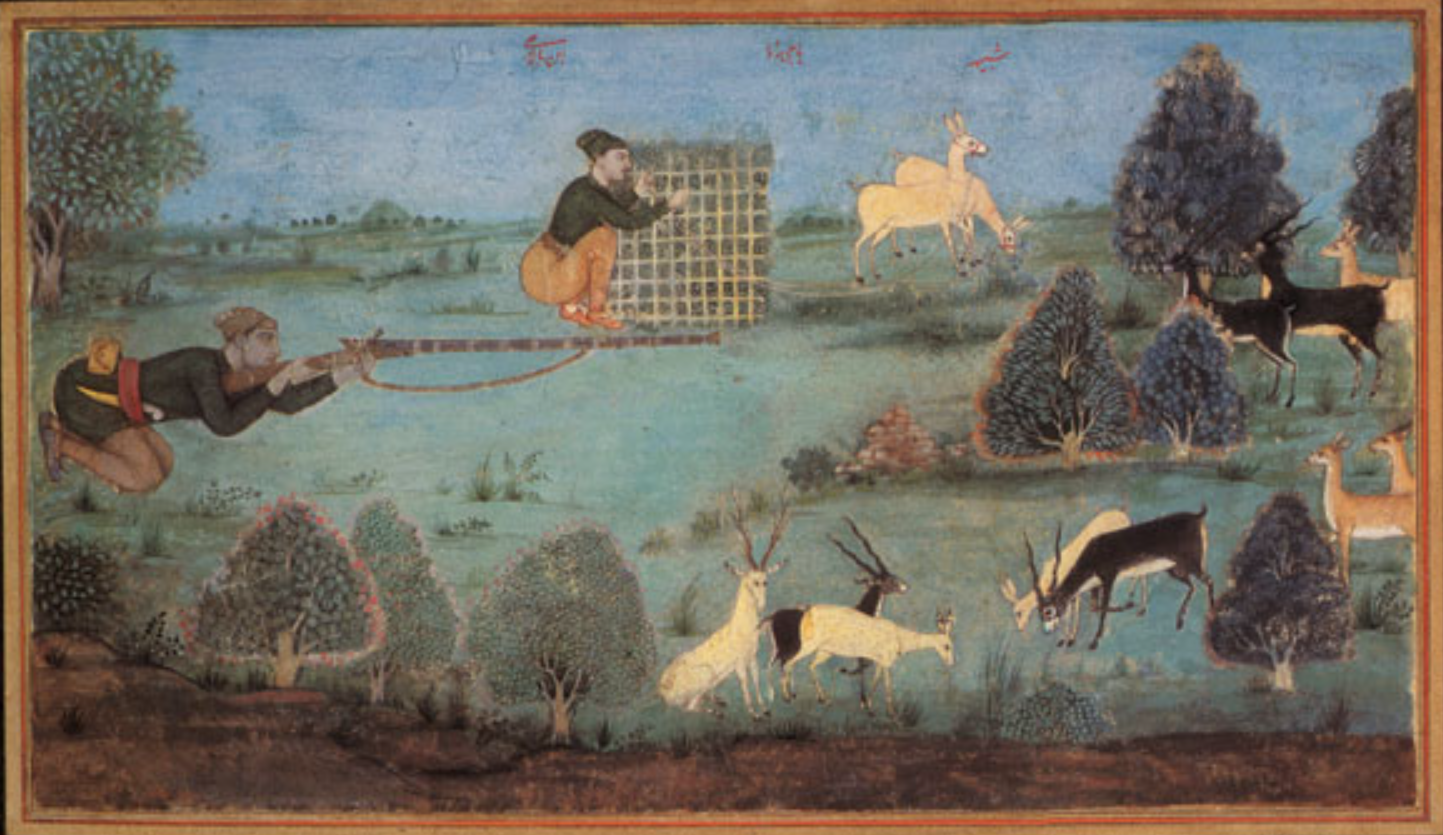
Depiction of Balaji Vishwanath hunting along with his son Bajirao

Balaji married Radhabai Barve and had two sons, Baji Rao I and Chimaji Appa. He also had two daughters. The older, Bhiubai married Abaji Joshi of Baramati, brother of the banker Balaji Naik famed as Bajirao I's most tormenting creditor. The younger, Anubai married Venkatrao Ghorpade of Ichalkaranji. Their heirs ruled the state of Ichalkaranji till 1947.

== Ancestral family ==
In the book written by Pramod Ok, पेशवे घराण्याचा इतिहास, he wrote about Peshwa's family. He creates Peshwa main family tree on page no. 19. According to him, there were 2 brothers of Peshwa Balaji Vishwanath - Antaji and Krishanaji. Their father was Parshuram Shivaji. His grandfather was Mahadaji and his great-grandfather was Visaji Bhatt.

== Death ==
Balaji returned in triumph from Delhi to Satara, having also secured the release after decades of Mughal captivity, the mother (Yesubai), wife (Savitribai) and half-brother (Madan Singh) of Shahu. Weary from his labors and the tiresome journey back from the imperial capital, Balaji Vishwanath's health began to fail. In October 1719 he obtained leave from Shahu to retire to the village of Saswad near Pune that had been granted by Shahu to the Peshwa. Balaji Vishwanath died on 12 April 1720. He was succeeded by his elder son, the celebrated Baji Rao I, who was appointed Peshwa by Chattrapati Shahu.

== Administration ==
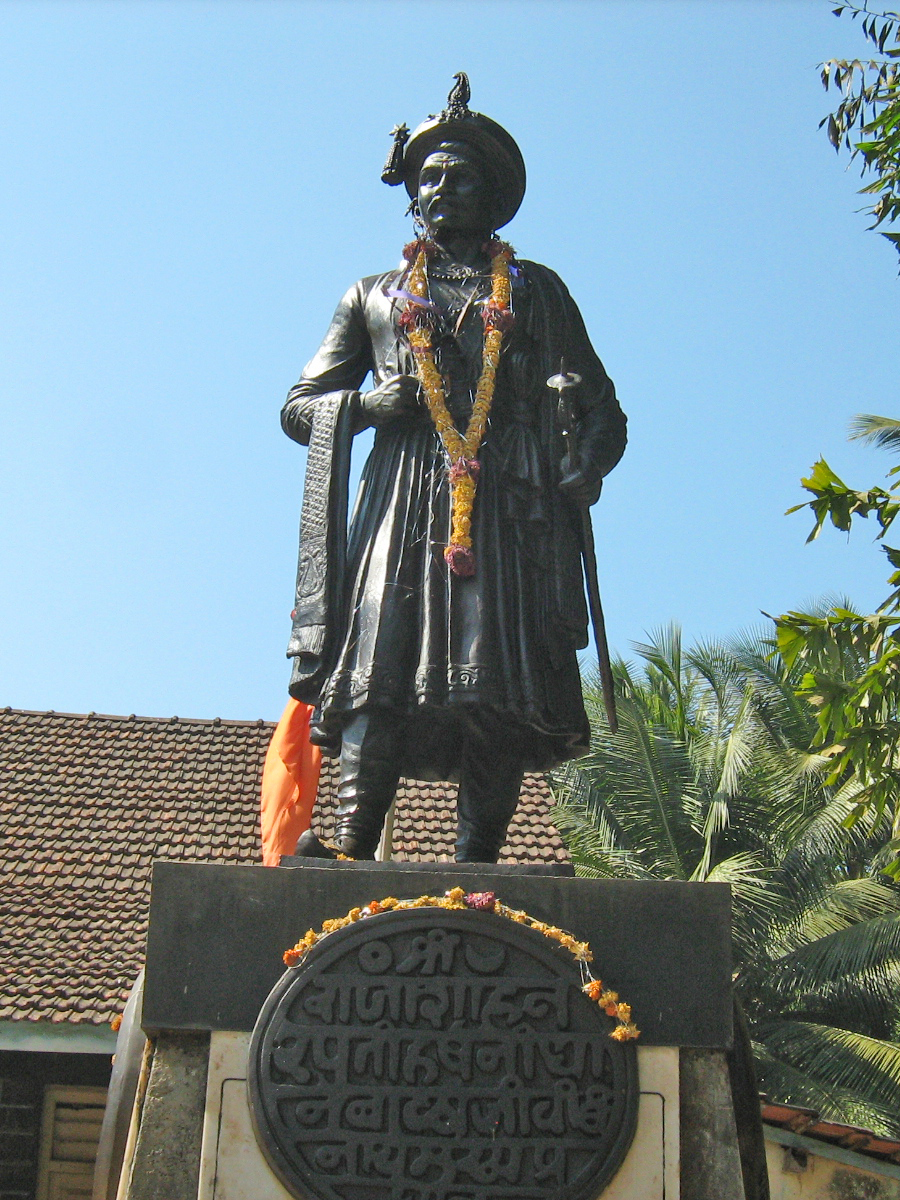
Statue of Balaji Vishwanath at Shrivardhan, Maharashtra

Balaji Vishwanath also laid the foundation for the complex administrative system of the Marathas that held sway for a century after his death. The Maratha tax collection system from a wide swathe of nominally Mughal provinces was based on a widespread network of agents and collectors. "To it as much as to their victories in the field the Marathas owed the spread of their empire". The mechanism of revenue collected was supported by credit facilities from established banking families.

== In popular culture ==
- Manish Wadhwa portrays Balaji Vishwanath in the television series Peshwa Bajirao.

Preceded by Parshuram Pant Pratinidhi	Peshwa; 1713–1720	Succeeded by Baji Rao I

== See also ==
- Peshawe Family
