= Chavan =

Maratha clan in India

Chavan or Chavhan is a Maratha clan found largely in Maharashtra, India, and neighbouring states.

== Origin ==
Chavan Maratha is a part of the 96 Maratha Clans (Chandravanshi) descendants of Prithivraj Chauhan. They were Generals and Nobles in the Swaraj of Chhatrapati Shivaji Maharaj. There are claims that they are Somvanshi, a larger category to which Agnivansh belong.

== Branches ==
Aatle, Achar, Ankushrao, Ambirrao, Esapute, Pachpute, Satpute, Kabhandh, Kalbhor, Kanojiya, Karkre, Kisab, Kaspale, Kalbhar, Kapde, Karbharee, Kedar, Kharkhare, Kharpate, Khartope, Khandekar, Khamkar, Khulale, Gund, Dhagdh, Chandawle, Chudawala, Dang, Dafle, Dhawle, Dhakle, Hambirrao, Sardesai, Tirkhunde, Titway, Tibe, Tegle, Temkar, Topsule, Tablkar, Thorad, Dare, Desai, Dhahibe, Dalpate, Dusing, Dewge, Dhadam, Dhopte, Dhoran, Prabhudesai, Prabhu, Parthe, Parwarkar, Phalke, Phage, Bache, Warge, Bhandare, Bhaykar, Bhobaskar, Bhalsinh, Bhonwar, Bhoyar, Bhorrdar, Randiwe, Langthe, Lotankar, Majalkar, Wadkar, Sinab, Hawle, Dhipule, Takwe, Dagde, Dangle, Date, Dhadpade, Dhadote, Dhekre, Zambre, Ugale.

== Notable people ==
=== Nobles ===
- Udaji Chavan (1696–1745), Senapati to Sambhaji II of Kolhapur.

=== Politicians ===
- Ashok Chavan (born 1958), 21st Chief Minister of Maharashtra, India
- Harischandra Devram Chavan (born 1951), Indian politician and Lok Sabha member
- Madhukarrao Chavan, Indian politician and a Maharashtra Vidhan Sabha Deputy Speaker
- Prithviraj Chavan (born 1946), 22nd Chief Minister of Maharashtra, India
- Shankarrao Chavan, (1920–2004), Chief Minister of Maharashtra, India during 1975–1977 and 1986–1988
- Vandana Chavan (born 1963), Indian politician and Rajya Sabha member
- Yashwantrao Chavan (1913–1984), first Chief Minister of Maharashtra, India

=== Other ===
- Ajay Chavan (born 1957), Indian cricketer
- Ankeet Chavan (born 1985), Indian cricketer
- Pushkaraj Chavan, Indian cricketer
- Nitish Chavan (born 1990), Indian actor
- Sulochana Chavan, Indian Marathi-language singer
- Usha Chavan (born 1955), Indian actress

== Sources ==
=== Marathi ===
- Balagi Nathugi Gavand; Govind Moroba Karlekar (1997). Kshytriya Marathyanchi Vanshavali and Shannavkuli aani Surya, Som, Bhramh and Sheshvant. Tukaram book Depo, Madhavbag, Mumbai 4.
- Bhramibhoot sadguru param pujya Moredada (11 July 2002). Shree Shatradharma, Prachalit and pramikh kshtravansh and tyanche gotra, pravar, kuldaivat, kuldevata a Devak. Shree Swami Samarth Seva And Adhyatmik vikas pradhan kendra District Nasik, Taluka Dindori, Maharashtra state.
- Gopal Dajiba Dalwi (1912). Maratha Kulancha Etihas. Vol. 1–6. Induprakash Press, Mumbai.

=== English ===
- Kamal K Chavan (1 September 1983). Maratha Murals Late Medieval Paintings Of The Deccan, 1650-1850 A.D. B.R. Publishing Corporation. ISBN 978-81-7018-097-5.
- Shibani Roy; S. H. M. Rizvi (1 January 2002). Encyclopaedia of Indian surnames. B.R. Pub. Corp. ISBN 978-81-7646-247-1.
- Reginald E. Enthoven (1975). The tribes and castes of Bombay. Cosmo Publ.
- Stewart Gordon (1993). The Marathas 1600-1818. Vol. Part 2, Volume 4. Cambridge University Press. ISBN 978-0-521-26883-7.
- Sir Herbert Hope Risley (1903). Census of India, 1901: Volume I. India [Part 2] Ethnographic appendices, being the data upon which the caste chapter of the Report [part 1] is based. Vol. 1. Office of the Superintendent of Govt. Print., India.
- Govind Sakharam Sardesai (1948). New History of the Marathas: The expansion of the Maratha power, 1707-1772. Phoenix Publications.
- G. T. Kulkarni (1983). The Mughal-Maratha relations: twenty five fateful years, 1682-1707. Dept. of History, Deccan College Post-Graduate Research Institute.
- K. G. Pitre (1990). The Second Anglo-Maratha War, 1802-1805: a study in military history. Dastane Ramchandra & Co. ISBN 978-81-85080-30-7.
- Edward James Rapson (1922). The Cambridge history of India. CUP Archive. p. 297. GGKEY:FP2CEFT2WJH.
- Rajaram Vyankatesh Nadkarnia (1966). The rise and fall of the Maratha Empire. Popular Prakashan.
- A. Rā Kulakarṇī (1996). Marathas and the Marathas Country: The Marathas. Books & Books.
- V. D. Divekar (1981). Survey of material in Marathi on the economic and social history of India. Bharata Itihasa Samshodhaka Mandala.
- Vishvanath Govind Dighe (1944). Peshwa Bajirao I & Maratha expansion. Karnatak publishing house.
- T. T. Mahajan (1 January 1990). Maratha administration in the 18th century. Commonwealth Publishers. ISBN 978-81-7169-081-7.
- Maharashtra State Gazetteers: Ahmadnagar, Maharashtra (India), Maharashtra (India). Gazetteers Dept.
- https://www.dailyo.in/arts/rajputs-marathas-maratha-rajputs-chhatrapati-shivaji-history-mughal-empire-kshatriyas-aurungzeb-mughals-british-maratha-warriors-30079
