= Diveagar =

Diveagar Kokan
- Village
- Location in Maharashtra, India
- Country: India
- State: Maharashtra
- District: Raigad

Population
  - Total: 4,069

Languages
  - Official: Marathi
- Time zone: UTC+5:30 (IST)
- Postal code: 402404

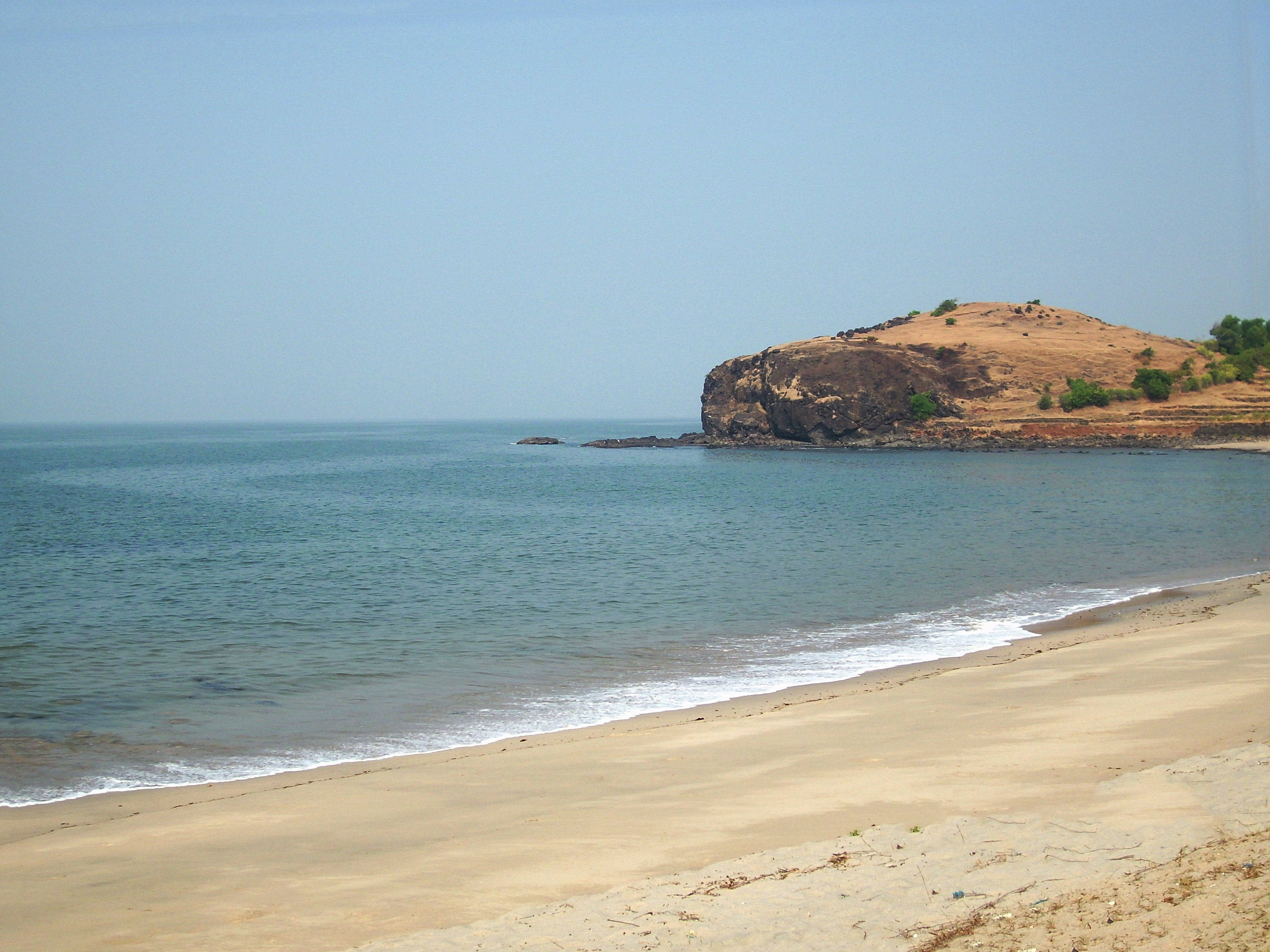
Another view of Diveagar beach

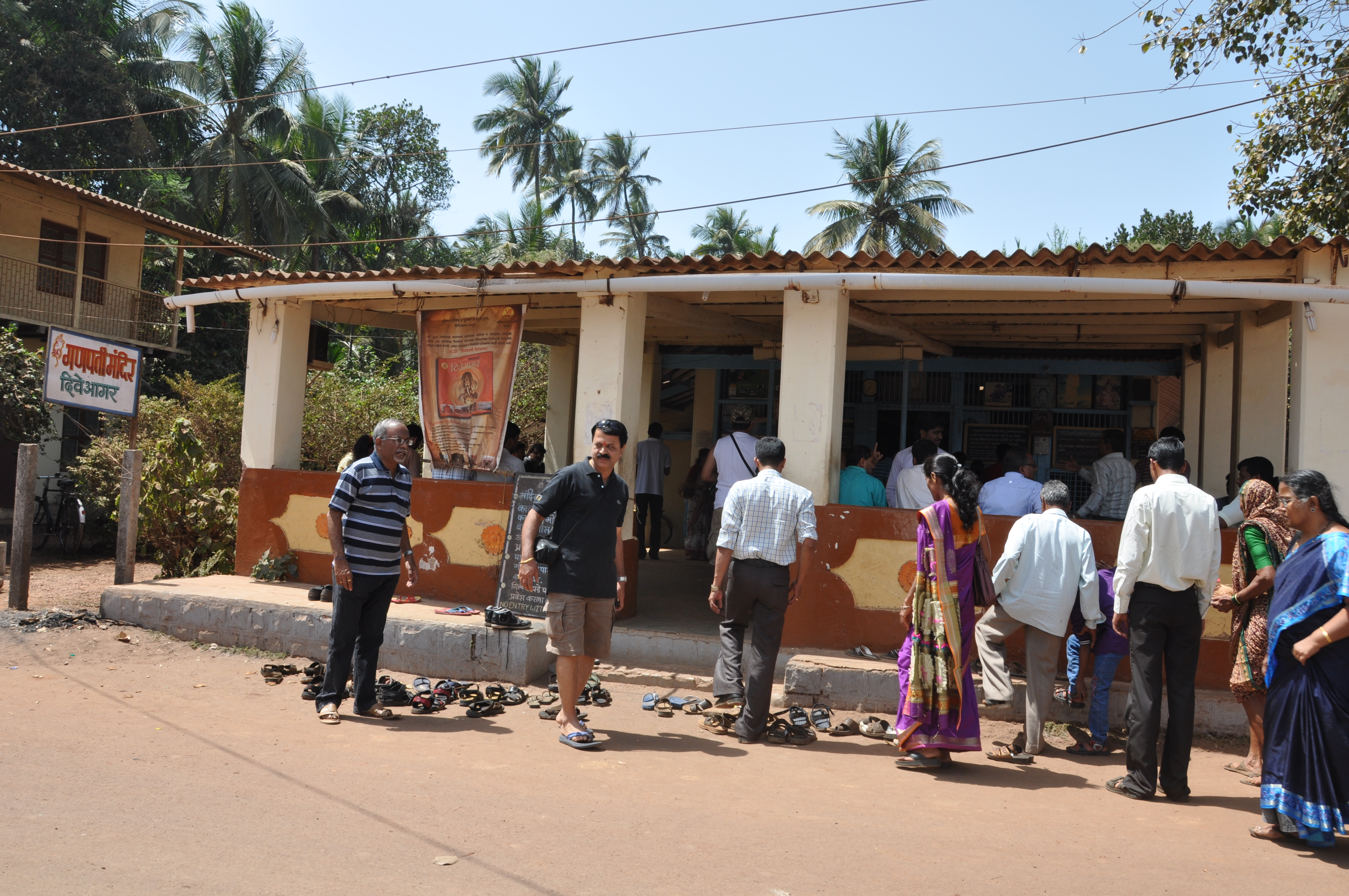
Diveagar Ganpati Temple

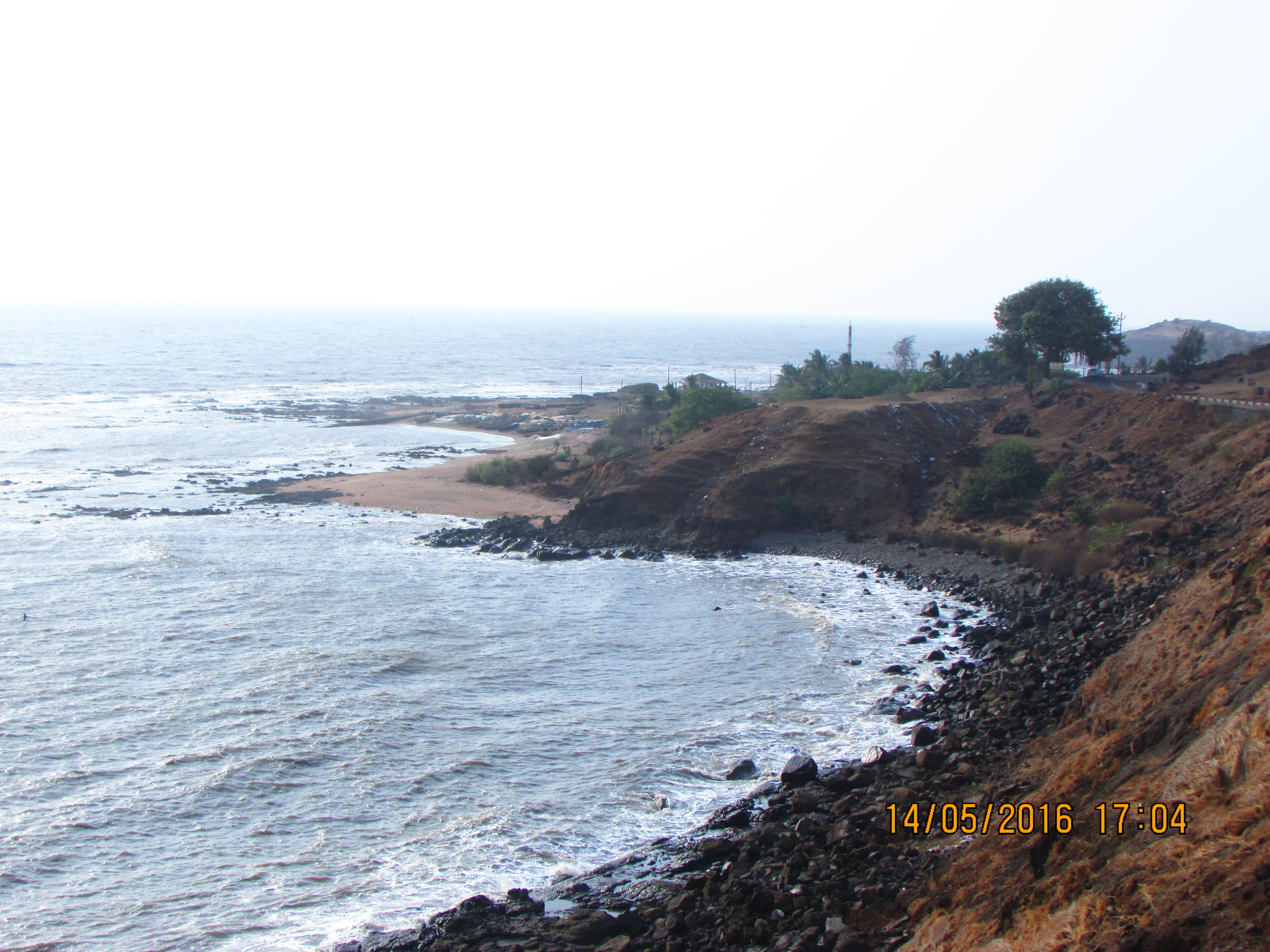

Diveagar (Dive Agar) is a village located in the Shrivardhan Taluka, Raigad district in the Indian state of Maharashtra, approximately 170 kilometers south of Mumbai. The region includes a fishing settlement, a beach, a temple, local businesses engaged in coconut and beetle nut tree farming, and some tourism businesses such as restaurants, cottage rentals and hotels, and six villages (from north to south): Velas, Musalmāndi, Agar Panchaitan, Diveagar, Borli Panchatan, and Karle. A Suvarna Ganesh Mandir with a lord Ganesh idol of gold is famous in Diveagar for tourists, the Ganesh idol was stolen on 24.3.2012 by some miscreants. The beach, facing the Arabian Sea, is approximately four kilometres long and undeveloped. At the north end of the beach, where a small stream enters the ocean there is the fishing settlement, Velas Agar, and some paddy farming, while at the south end there is a sanctuary for migratory seabirds. Nearby, there is a small fishing village, where vendors sell fresh fish, which goes by name of Bharadkhol. The beach is accessible from the Mumbai-Goa highway via Kolad or Karnala.

The beach contains a number of suru trees (Casuarina), which are common to coastal Maharashtra. The access to the beach has a dense cover of belu trees, which are otherwise uncommon in the area.
