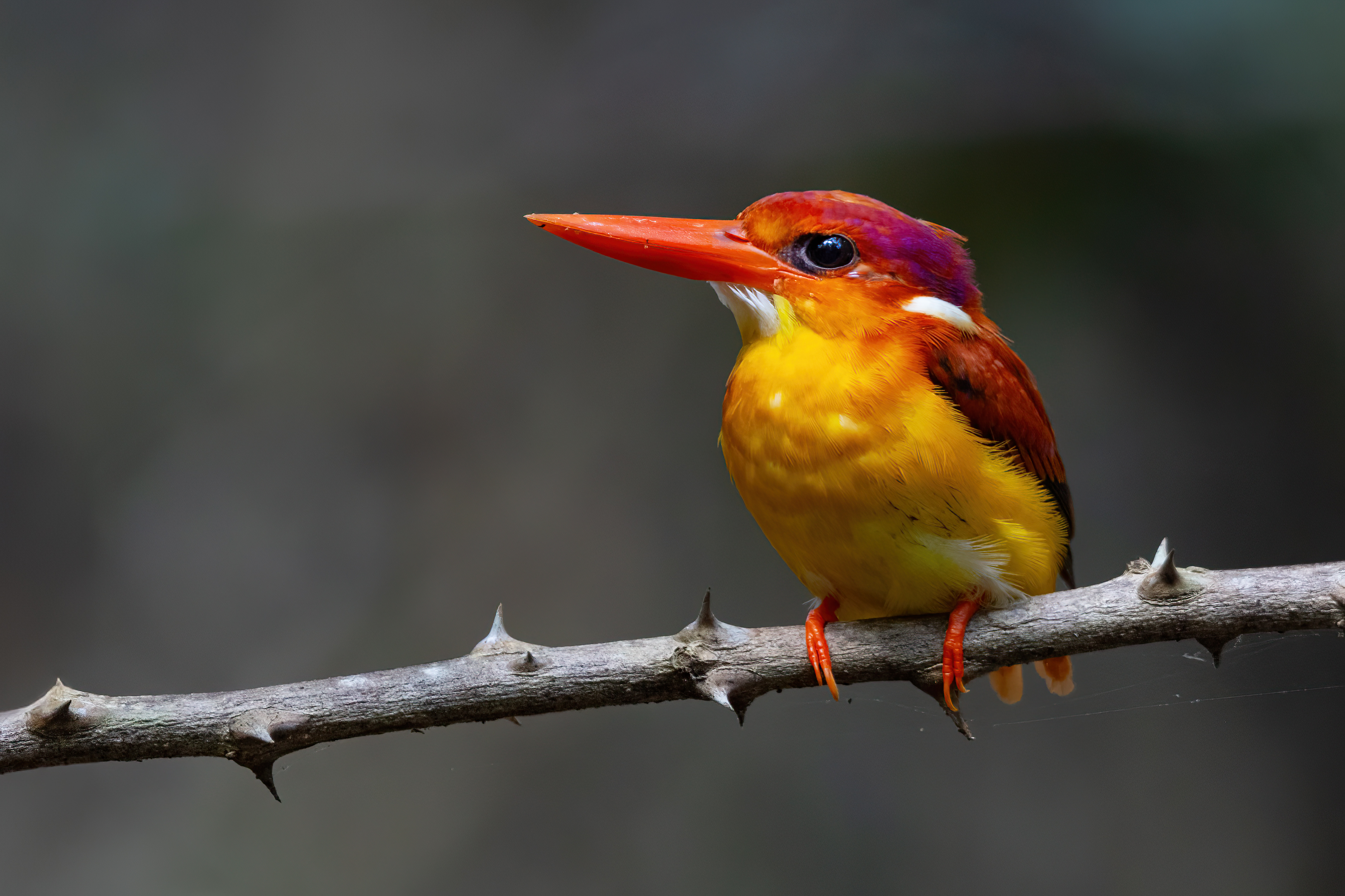
- On the island of Java in Indonesia

Conservation status
- Least Concern (IUCN 3.1)

Scientific classification
- Kingdom: Animalia
- Phylum: Chordata
- Class: Aves
- Order: Coraciiformes
- Family: Alcedinidae
- Subfamily: Alcedininae
- Genus: Ceyx
- Species: C. rufidorsa

Binomial name
- Ceyx rufidorsa Strickland, 1847

= Rufous-backed dwarf kingfisher =

Species of bird

The rufous-backed dwarf kingfisher (Ceyx rufidorsa) is a small bird in the kingfisher family Alcedinidae that is found in parts of Maritime Southeast Asia. It was formerly considered to be conspecific with the black-backed dwarf kingfisher and together the two taxa were known by the English name "oriental dwarf kingfisher".

This tropical kingfisher is easily distinguishable from other birds in its range due to its red bill, yellow-orange underparts, lilac-rufous upperparts, and rufous back. It resides in lowland forests, typically near streams or ponds, where it feeds upon insects, spiders, worms, crabs, fish, frogs, and lizards.

== Taxonomy ==
The rufous-backed dwarf kingfisher was formally described in 1847 by the English naturalist Hugh Edwin Strickland under the current binomial name Ceyx rufidorsa. He specified the type locality as Malacca at the southern end of the Malay Peninsula. The specific epithet combines Latin rufus meaning "rufous" with dorsus meaning "back".

The rufous-backed dwarf kingfisher was formerly considered to be a colour morph of the black-backed dwarf kingfisher (Ceyx erithaca). The two species complex was known as the "oriental dwarf kingfisher". Molecular genetic studies have shown that Ceyx rufidorsa is a distinct taxon and that the polymorphism is the result of ancient introgression in which some genes from Ceyx erithaca were transferred to Ceyx rufidorsa around 140,000 years ago.

Five subspecies are recognised:

- C. r. rufidorsa Strickland, 1847 – south Malay Peninsula, Sumatra, Lubang, Bangka and Belitung (east of south Sumatra), Java, Borneo (except northeast) and Lesser Sunda Islands to Flores and Pantar.
- C. r. motleyi Chasen & Kloss, 1929 – northeast Borneo (Sabah to East Kalimantan) and adjacent northern offshore islands
- C. r. captus Ripley, 1941 – Nias (west of north Sumatra)
- C. r. jungei Ripley, 1942 – Batu Islands and Simeulue (west of north Sumatra)
- C. r. vargasi Manuel, 1939 – Lubang, Mindoro (northwest, southwest Philippines),
