= Udaji Chavan =

- Himmat Bahadur

Senapati to the Chhatrapati Sambhaji II of the Kolhapur
- Reign: 1716 - 1742
- Predecessor: Piraji Ghorpade
- Born: 1692
- Died: 1762; Andur
- Issue: Vithoji II; Pritirao
- House: Chavan
- Father: Vithoji Chavan
- Religion: Hindu

Udaji Chavan (1692-1762), was one of the main supporter and Senapati of Sambhaji II of Kolhapur. He had the title of 'Himmat Bahadur'. At first he was partisan of Tarabai. Afterwards, he became the supporter of Samhaji of Kolhapur. He brought territory of Shirol, Raibag under Kolhapur's control from Gharge-Desai-Deshmukh's. He made 'Battis Shirala' on the bank of Warna his chief headquarters. He successfully launched many campaigns against Shahu with the help of Yashwantrao Thorat.

== Appointed as Senapati ==
When Sambhaji II became Chhatrapati of Kolhapur Ramchandra Pant Amatya was his chief minister. After the death of Amatya in 1716, Udaji support Sambhaji in his territory. So Sambhaji gave Udaji Chavan the saranjam of Rs.4,00,000 lakh in Shirol and make him Senapati of his territory in 1716.

== March on Shahu's territory ==
After becoming Senapati he became aggressive in Shahu's territory. He March on Shahu's territory with the help of Yashwantrao Thorat from 1718 to 1719.

== Battle of Shirol ==
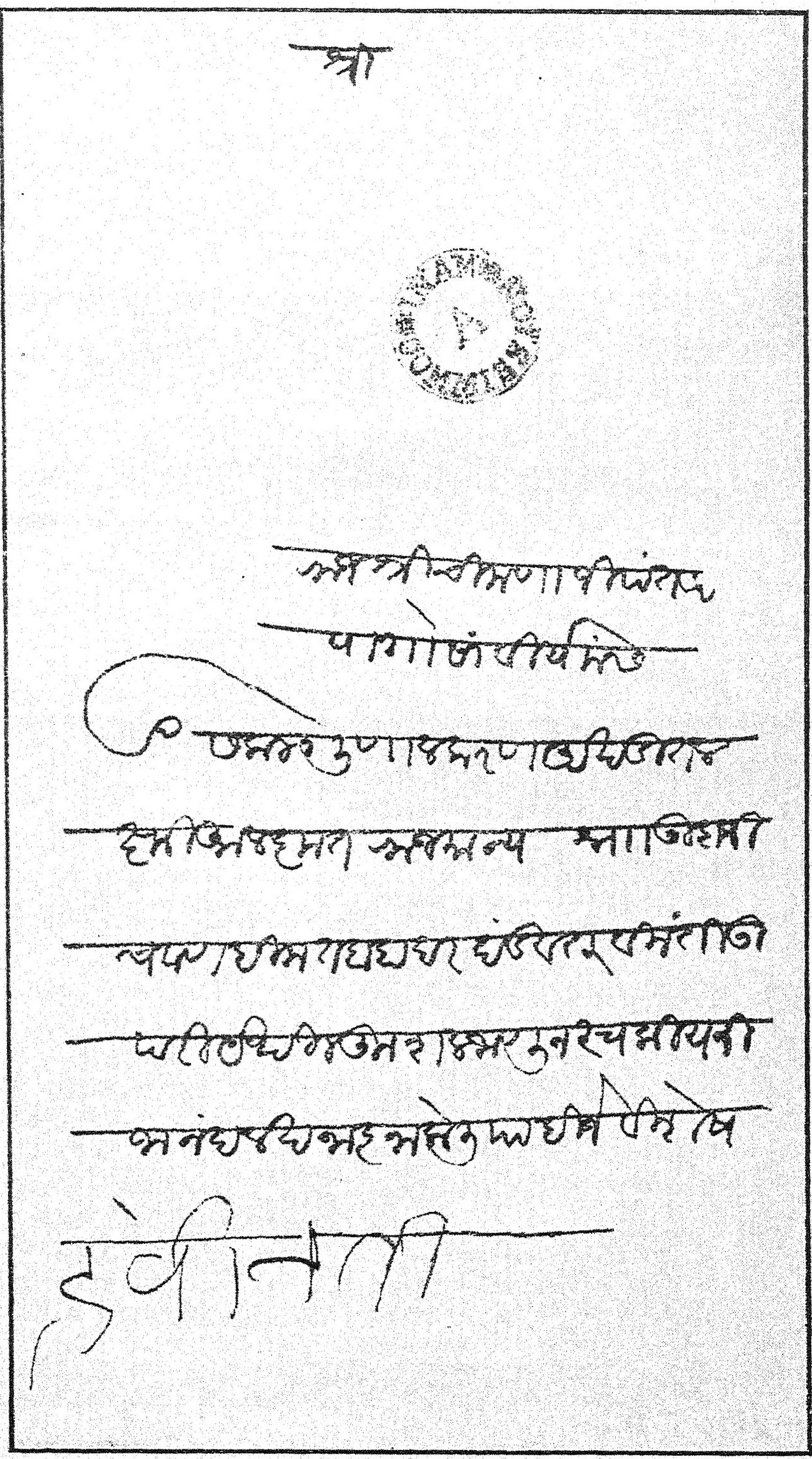
Letter wrote by Himmat Bahadur Senapati Udaji Chavan

Udaji Chavan created trouble in the territory of Shahu as per the instructions of Sambhaji and collected 'Chavan Chauthai'. So Shahu sent Shripatrao Pantpratinidhi to help Gharge-Desai-Deshmukhs with heavy artillery to Shirol. Chavan faced Shahu's troops for two and half months and afterwards wrote letter to Sambhaji II and requested him to come with his troops. Samhaji came with his troops. The battle was fought between Pratinidhi and Udaji Chavan at Shirol. At last, Udaji was defeated. So they escape to Panhala. This battle is known as the 'Battle of Shirol'.

== Attack on Rahimatpur ==
Rao Rambha (Rambhaji) Nimbalkar and his son Janoji Nimbalkar attacked on Satara territory. At that time Udaji Chavan attacked Rahimatpur in August 1726. Shahu ordered his chief Rayaji Jadhav and Jigasinghraje Gharge-Desai-Deshmukh to make a counterattack on Udaji. But Rambhaji Nimbalkar came with his troops to Udaji's help. Rayaji and Jigasinghraje was defeated and Rayaji was killed in this fight.

== Second battle of Vadgaon ==
Shahu and Sambhaji II prepared themselves for war. Shahu himself remained encamped at Umbraj. His sardar created trouble in the Sambhaji's territory. To face this situation Sambhaji and Udaji Chavan organised their troops. Bhagwantrao Amatya, Krishnaropant Pratinidhi, Vyankatrao Ghorpade Ichalkaranjikar, Torgalkar Shinde, Shidoji Ghorpade, Sidoji Thorat and others came with their troops around 25,000 troops. Sambhaji decide to march towards Satara. By crossing river Warna they besieged a thana of Shahu. Sambhaji was at Vadgaon on the bank of Warna. Pratinidhi, the commander of Shahu's force made sudden attack on Sambhaji. Udaji Chavan faced them. But, at last they was defeated by Shahu's force. Many of his troops were killed or taken as prisoners. Udaji and Sambhaji escaped to Panhala fort. This battle was fought in 1730. This battle is known as 'The Second Battle of Vadgaon'.

== After 1731 ==
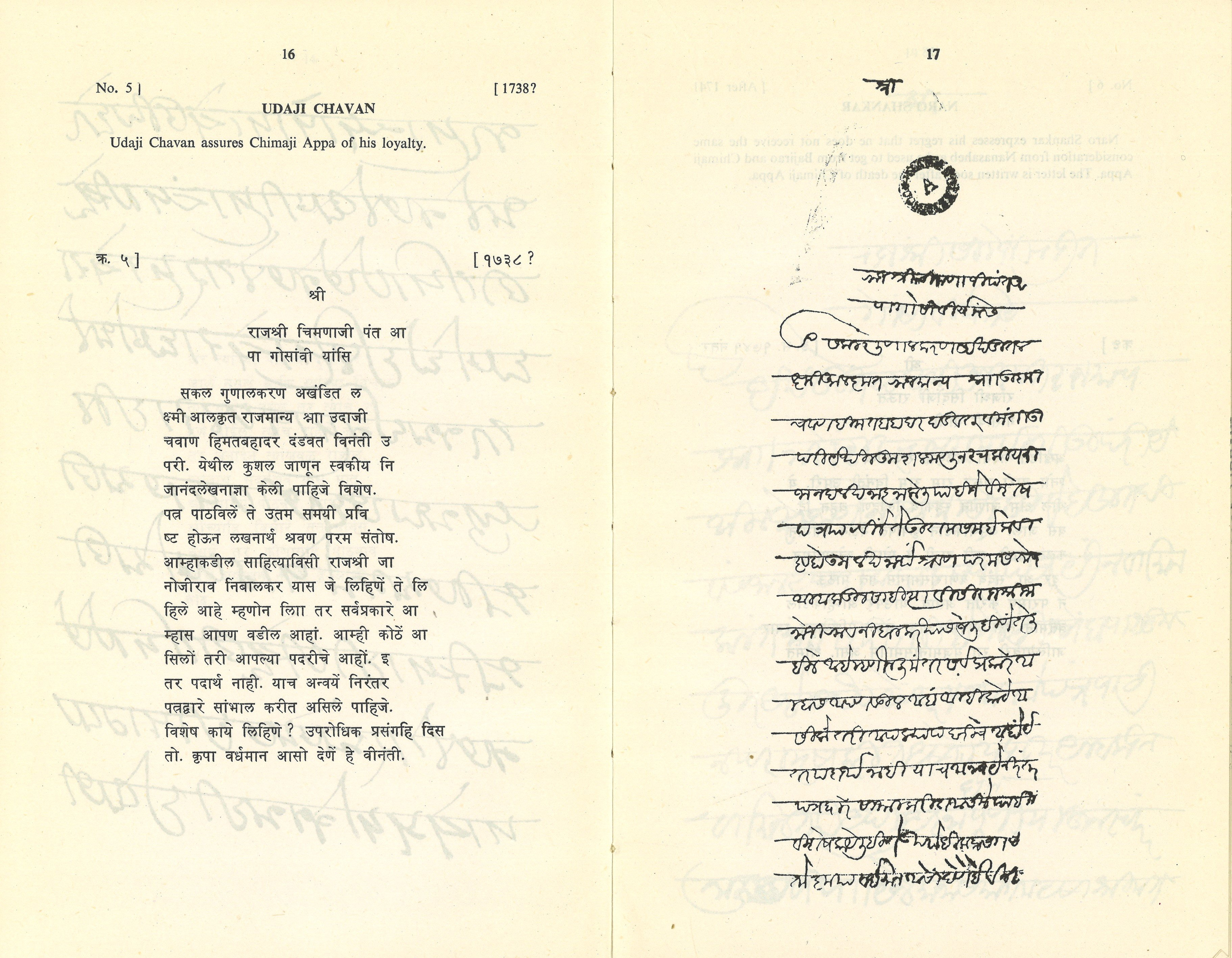
The Letter wrote by Udaji Chavan to Chimaji Appa to assures his loyalty

In 1731, the 'Treaty of Warna' was signed between Shahu I and Sambhaji II. Now the importance of Udaji was decreasing. At the end of 1737 he tried to go to Peshwa's side. In 1738 he wrote a letter to Chimaji Appa to assure him of his loyalty.

== Personal life ==
Udaji Chavan was son of Himmat Bahadur Vithoji Chavan who take important role in the war against Mughals during the reign of Chhatrapati Rajaram I. For his bravery Rajaram Maharaj gave him the title of 'Himmat Bahadur'. Vithoji Chavan worked under the Senapati Santaji Ghorpade and Dhanaji Jadhav. On 25 May 1696, Vithoji died in the battle against the Mughals near Bangluru.

== Death ==
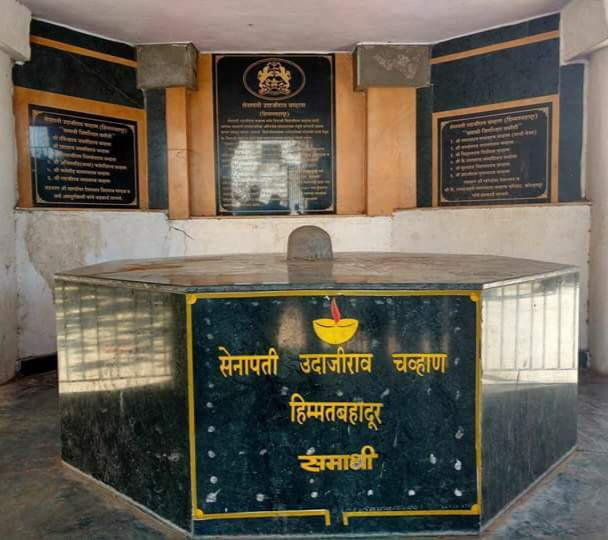
Samadhi of Himmat Bahadur Senapati Udaji Chavan

In November 1762, there was a conflict between Akkalkotkar and Udaji Chavan because of a village. In that fight Udaji Chavan died. At that time his son Vithoji II and Pritirao was at Naldurg. They take the body of Udaji to Andur at Naldurg and build a Samadhi of Udaji.
