= Senakhaskhel =

Nobility title in Maratha Empire

Senakhaskhel is a title of nobility in the Maratha Empire. This title was instated by Rajaram I, the Maratha emperor, at the end of the 17th century. It is placed after the Senapati title and is considered to a more important one. Senakhaskhel means upasenapati (sub-commander) and translates to 'a leader of the sovereign tribe' in English. A Senakhaskhel has permission to keep an army. The Chhatrapati provided a Senakhaskhel with the salary of an army, called the 'fauz saranjam' (army accouterments). In a time of war, a Senakhaskhel was obliged to come with his army by order of the Chhatrapati.
