= Shrivardhan =

Shrivardhan Shriwardhan
- City
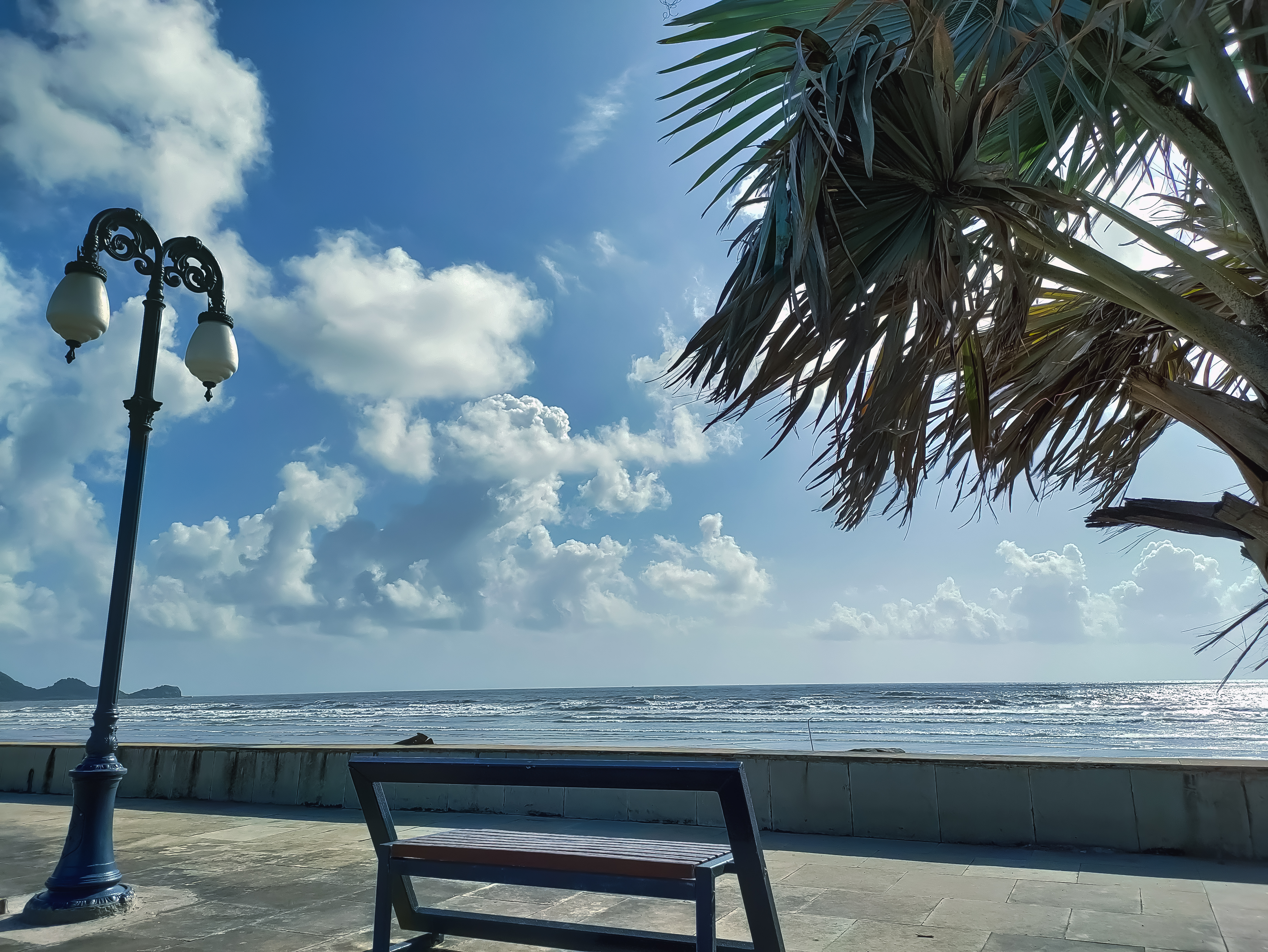
- A view of Shrivardhan beach

- Location in Maharashtra
- Coordinates: 18°02′59.977″N 73°0′48.642″E
- Country: India
- State: Maharashtra
- District: Raigad

Government
  - Type: Municipal Council

Area
  - Total: 120 km^{2} (46 sq mi)

Population (2001)
  - Total: 15,123
  - Density: 130/km^{2} (330/sq mi)
- Demonym: Shrivardhankar

Language
  - Official: Marathi
- Time zone: UTC+5:30 (IST)
- PIN: 402110
- Vehicle registration: MH 06
- Nearest city: Murud, Mangaon
- Website: divcomkonkan.gov.in/Document/en/page/ShrivardhanBeach.aspx

Shrivardhan (also spelled Shriwardhan) is a subdistrict/upazila/tehsil, city, and local governing body in the Raigad district of the Indian state of Maharashtra. It is renowned as the birthplace of Balaji Vishwanath, the first Peshwa (1713–1720) and father of Bajirao I, who held the position of Deshmukh in the town. It has developed into a seaside resort, along with the nearby town of Harihareshwar, which also has a Shiva temple. Located on a peninsula, the town itself boasts many beaches, in addition to proximity to numerous other beach destinations, such as Diveagar Beach and Kondivali Beach. People from across Maharashtra come to Shrivardhan and the nearby beaches all year round.

The taluka of Shriwardhan is an ancient place of historical importance and is mentioned as being visited by Arjuna Pandav in his pilgrimage. It was an important port in the past, well known to traders of Ahmednagar and Bijapur in the 16th and 17th centuries. It appears in the accounts of leading European travellers, for example, Ziffardan. In 1538, Dom Joao de Castro described it as having little water under the pier at low tide, but that the interior of the city was large and roomy. In 1713, Shriwardhan was one of the sixteen fortified places in the Konkan, ceded by Balaji Vishwanath Peshwa to Kanhoji Angre of Kolaba. Balaji was the first Peshwa of Maratha Empire appointed by Chhatrapati Shri Shahu Maharaj, grandson of Chhatrapati Shri Shivaji Maharaj

== Geography ==
Shrivardhan is located in Raigad District of State of Maharashtra. The distance between Shrivardhan and Harihareshwar is 18 km and they are often considered to be twin cities. Diveagar is a quieter place than both cities, which has garnered it recent notice which has initiated its transformation into a popular tourist destination. Kondivali beach is also an important tourist destination, located just 10 minutes from Shrivardhan by bike.

Most of the people are engaged in fishing and agriculture, with fish being a popular offering for tourism. Shriwardhan is mostly covered with mango and coconut trees. The city is home to many hotels and resorts, and is popular as a destination for weekend getaways and group picnics.

=== Transport ===
An availability of Maharashtra state transport buses, which provide connections to all neighbouring cities. Buses and private vehicles connect Mumbai (185 km) via the NH66 highway route, Pune (163 km), Harihareshwar (20 km) and Panvel (125 km). The nearest train station is in Mangaon, located 45 km away from Shrivardhan with strong connections throughout the Konkan coast to Pune and Mumbai.

== History ==
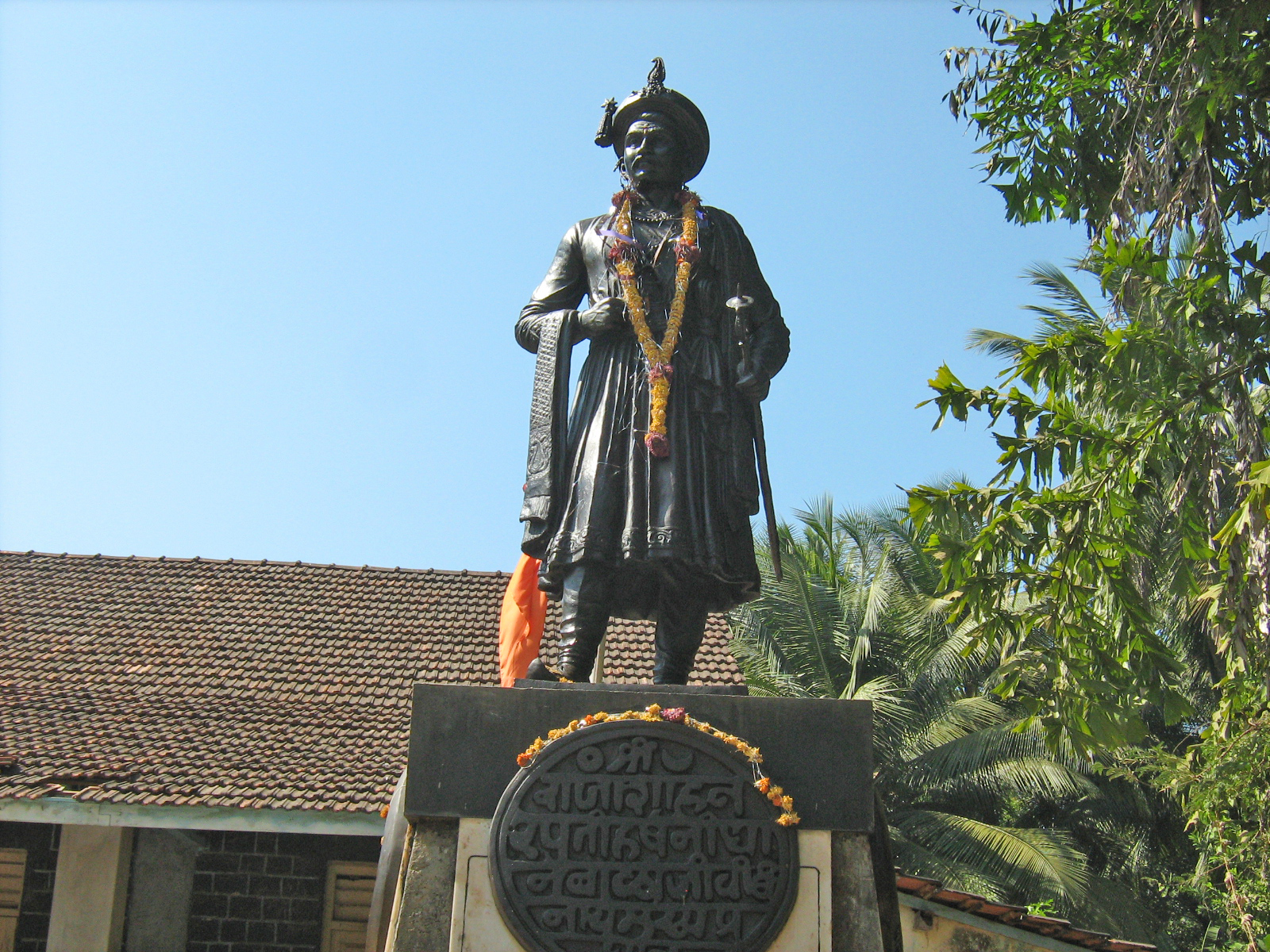
Statue of Peshwa Balaji Vishwanath in Shrivardhan

Shrivardhan is one of the oldest towns in Maharashtra. It is a town of Peshwas. The Bhat Deshmukhs of Shrivardhan - later popularly known as Peshwas - witnessed the rise and the fall of Marathas after the Chhatrapati Shivaji Maharaj period. Though the capital of Peshwas was Pune, the actual institution of Peshwa (prime-ministership under a symbolic king) was born in Shrivardhan in 1713. Balaji Vishwanath (the first Peshwa) took control of the position and gained de facto rule in the Maratha empire under the now-symbolic rule of the Chatrapati king. The Peshwas administered the Maratha Empire for more than 100 years, a period which ended in 1818 following the defeat of the last Peshwa in the Third Anglo-Maratha War. The third Peshwa, Balaji Bajirao, built a huge house here in 1750, which has recently been renovated. The statue of Balaji Vishwanath was also installed here in 1988.

The temple in the town - Shri Laxminarayan Temple - is the main temple of Peshwas. The idol in the temple is quite old and is said to be of Hoysala architecture style. The other temples in the town are of Kusumdevi, Somjai, Bhairavnath and Jivaneshwar.

== Demographics ==
As of the 2001 India census, Shrivardhan had a population of 15,187. Males constitute 49% of the population and females 51%. Shrivardhan has an average literacy rate of 74%, higher than the national average of 59.5%: male literacy is 80%, and female literacy is 68%. In Shrivardhan, 12% of the population is under 6 years of age.

=== Languages ===
Alongside Marathi, there are more or less 4 languages and/or dialects spoken in the town. Few other languages are commonly spoken other than Marathi, as Marathi is the preferred language of 99% of the town's residents. Konkani, which is part of Marathi literature, is spoken by just 25% of the town. Urdu is also spoken especially by the Muslims.

== Education ==
There are 130 primary schools in Shrivardhan Taluka, including three in the city. There is a routine school health check up organized by the National Rural Health Mission doctors to assess the health status of school going children. Schools in Shrivardhan Taluka are covered under the Mid Day Meal program, which assures good quality protein-rich food to the school going children.

== See also ==
- Shrivardhan Fort
