= Agar Panchaitan =

- village
- Location in Maharashtra, India
- Coordinates: 18.173692°N 72.988533°E
- Country: India
- State: Maharashtra
- District: Raigad

Languages
  - Official: Marathi
- Time zone: UTC+5:30 (IST)
- Vehicle registration: MH-

Agar Panchaitan is a town located in the state of Maharashtra, on the west coast of India. It is located approximately 60 miles south of Mumbai.
