= Mangaon =

- Sub District Town
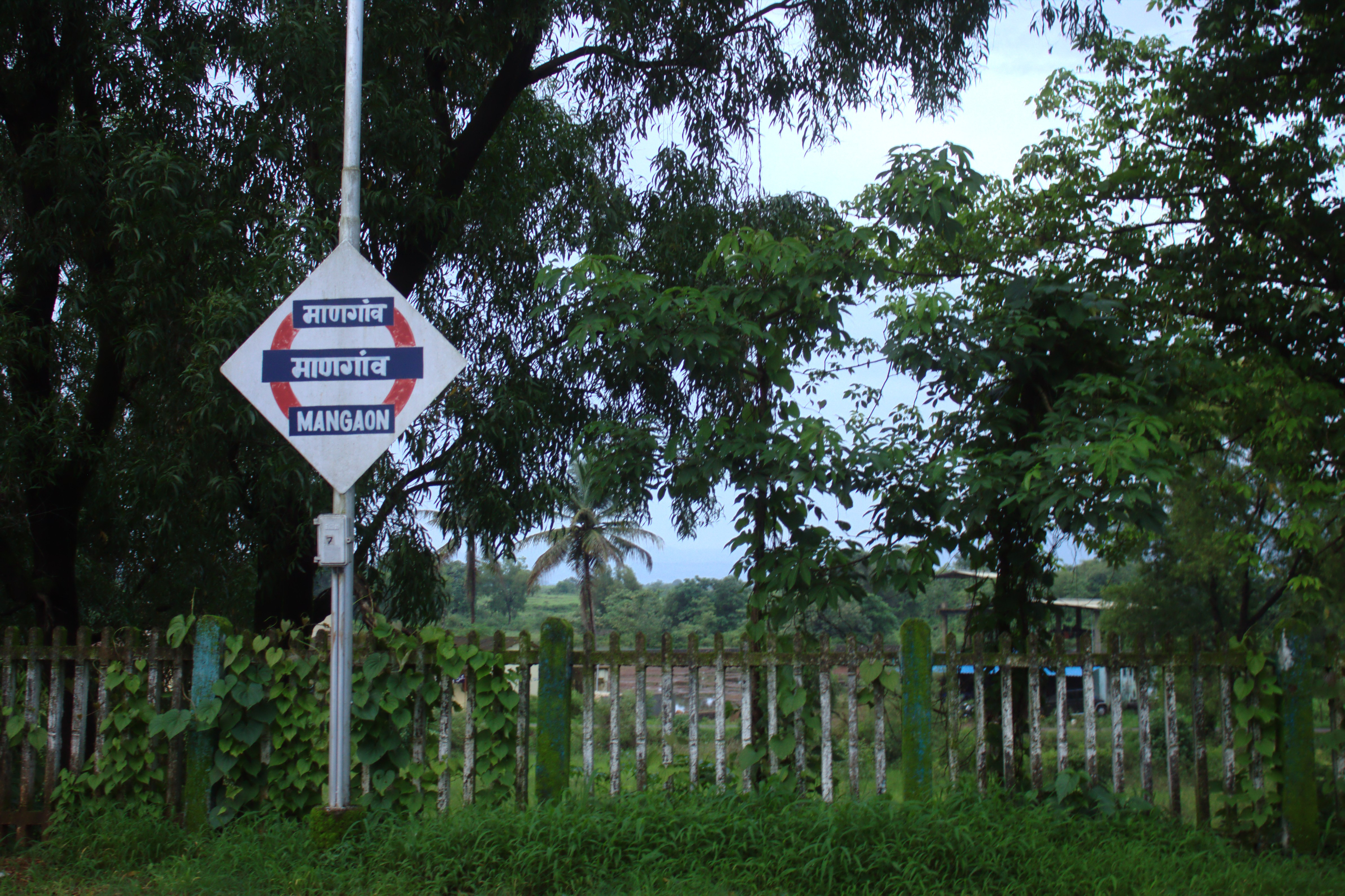
- Mangaon Railway Station

- Location in Maharashtra, India
- Coordinates: 18°14′N 73°17′E
- Country: India
- State: Maharashtra
- Division: Konkan
- District: Raigad
- Established: Upgraded to Nagar Panchayat in 2015

Government
  - Type: Nagar Panchayat

Population (2011)
  - Total: 11,380

Languages
  - Official: Marathi
  - Regional: Konkani, Agri-Koli
- Time zone: UTC+5:30 (IST)
- PIN: 402104
- Telephone code: 02140
- Vehicle registration: MH-06
- Nearest city: Mumbai (146 km), Pune (121 km), Panjim (450 km)
- Literacy: 75.30%
- Climate: Hot-humid; heavy rain during monsoon season
- Avg. summer temperature: 35 °C (95 °F)
- Avg. winter temperature: 20 °C (68 °F)
- Website: maharashtra.gov.in

Mangaon is a Village and tehsil (council) in the Konkan Division, India. It is located in the Raigad district, 80 km (49.7 mi) from Alibaug headquarters, and 139 km (86.4 mi) from the capital city of Bombay (Mumbai). The area is located towards the Panjim side of Goa.

== History ==
Mangaon has been identified with the site of the ancient village of Kothuraka, mentioned in the so-called Kothuraka grant of the 5th-century Vakataka ruler Pravarasena II. The same inscription also mentions a place called Maṇḍuki-grāma, which has been identified with the nearby village of Mandgaon, 3 km north of Mangaon.

== Industrial development ==
The Vile-Bhagad M.I.D.C. industrial zone, which is located in Mangaon, was previously in a dilapidated state due to a lack of investment. Lately, however, the zone has increased in importance and houses several steel companies, including POSCO LTD. Moreover, Tata Power Ltd.'s hydroelectric project has greatly reduced the need for additional energy generation in the Mangaon Taluka and industrial zones in Raigad. Recently 15,000 acres (6,100 ha) have been declared under MIDC acquisition in Mangaon.

=== Dr. Babasaheb Ambedkar Technical University ===
The Dr. Babasaheb Technical University, Lonere, was established in the Mangaon taluka mainly catering to industrial and technical industries and offers several courses in petroleum and chemical technology. The university primarily attracts students from Konkan, but also from other parts of Maharashtra, including Marathawada, Vidarbha and West Maharashtra, many of whom attend the university to pursue courses such as petrochemical and petroleum chemical engineering which are only taught in a few universities across India.

=== Konkan Railway ===
The development of Mangaon was boosted by the arrival of the Konkan Railway. Mangaon and Roha are the only railway stations near a taluka in Southern Raigad.

Mangaon railway station is the nearest station to Shrivardhan, Dive Agar, Hari-Hareshwar, Mhasala, Tala, Nijampur, Mahad, Raigad and Poladpur. It provides employment for several areas, including Auto-Rickshawala, Minidor, and Taxi-Van drivers who provide transport services from the Mangaon railway station to more remote locations.

== Attractions ==
Mangad fort lies in the Manjarwane Panchayat area, situated 15 km from the taluka market area of Nijampur. The fort consists of one main gate connected to a set of mountains. Nearby you can find the Kumbhe waterfall.

Raigad fort in Mahad taluka is 22 kilometres from Mangaon, making the town a convenient access point to the fort.

Tirupati temple is also considered highly important and noteworthy place in Mangaon.

The hydroelectric project at Bhira that generates power for the whole taluka is also considered a place of interest for visitors.

The AeroVillage Panheli is a famous resort where Aircraft Joyrides are offered

Other famous sites of Mangaon:

- The tunnel at Kumbhe and Kumbhe waterfall.
- The Bapuji and mahakali temple at Kadape.
- The sports centre at Khardi.
- The Ganpati and Mugawali Temples along the river Kaal.
- The temple of the local goddess Vakdai.
- Swayambhu Hanuman temple Gharoshi.
- AeroVillage Panheli Resort

== Administrative subdivisions ==
There are 187 villages in Mangaon taluka, organized into 74 panchayats.

=== Panchayats ===
- Ambarle
- Bamnoli
- Bhagad
- Bhale
- Bhandivli

Borwadi (nivachiwadi)

- Chach
- Chandore
- Chinchavali
- Dahiwali Kond
- Dahiwali Tarf Govele
- Dakhane
- Degaon
- Devali
- Dongroli
- Gangawali
- Goregaon
- Govele
- Harkol
- Hodgaon
- Jite
- Javali
- Kadape
- Kakal
- kalamaje
- Karambeli
- Kavilvahal Kh.
- Kavilvahal
- Kharavali
- Koshimble
- Koste Kh.
- Kumbhe
- Kumshet
- Kurvade
- Lakhapale
- Lonere
- Lonshi
- Madhegaon
- Mangaon
- Mangrul
- Manjarwane
- Marjurne
- Maktigaon
- Morba
- Muthavali Tarf Tale
- Nagaon
- nagaroli
- Nandavi
- Nhave
- Nijampur
- Nilaj
- Pahel
- Palasgaon Bk.
- Palsap
- Panalghar Kh
- Panhalghar Bk.
- Pansai
- Patnus
- Pen Tarf Tale
- Phalani
- Potner
- Purar
- Ratwad
- Rawalje
- Rudrol
- Sai
- Saje
- Sale
- Salve
- Sanaswadi
- Shirawali Tarf. Nijampur
- Shirsad
- Surav Tarf. Tale
- Talashet
- Talegaon Tarf Goregaon
- Tol budruk
- Tol khurd
- Unegaon
- Vanimalaikond
- Vihule
- Vile
- Wadawali
- Wadgaon
- Warachiwadi
- Warak
- Wave Diwali
