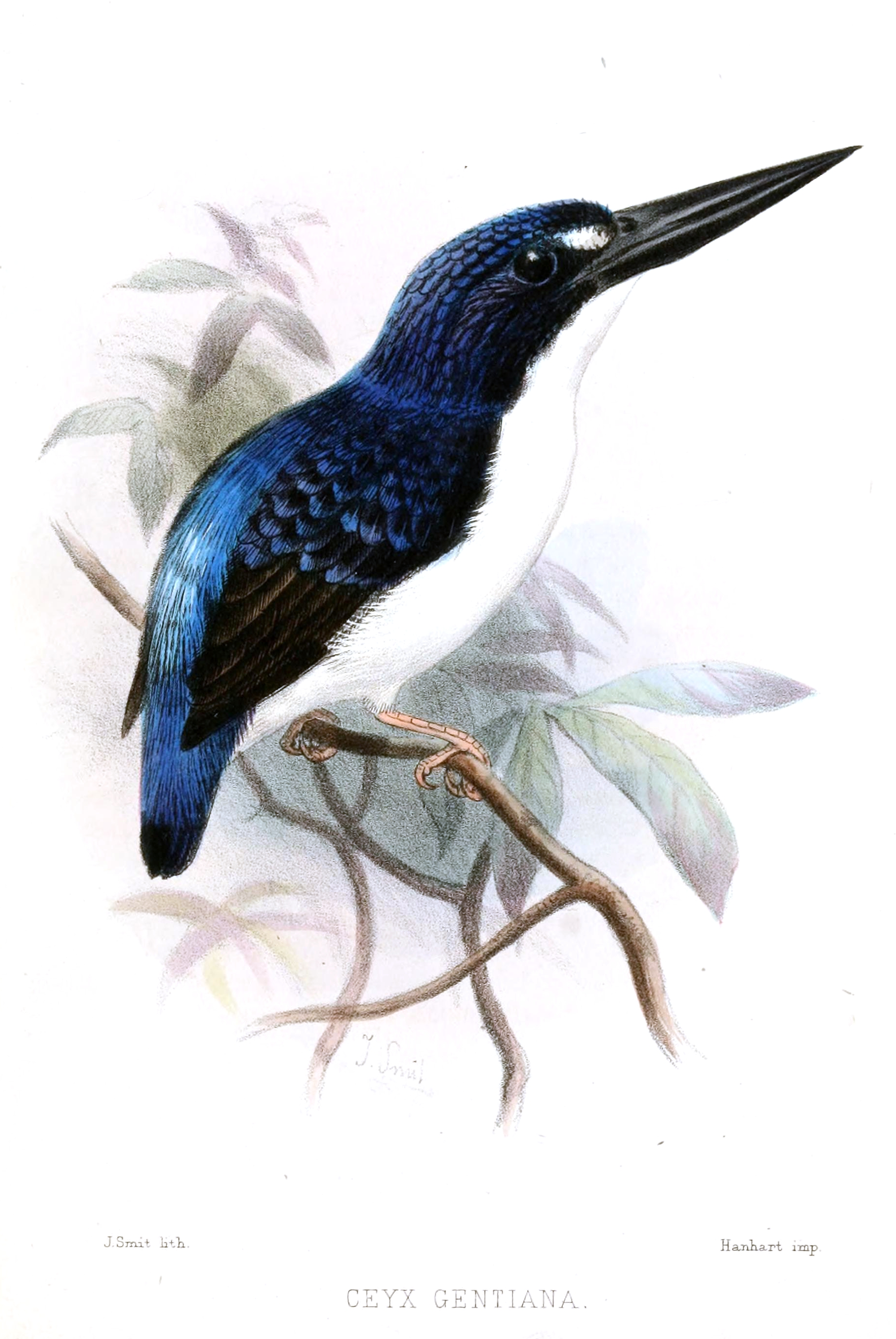

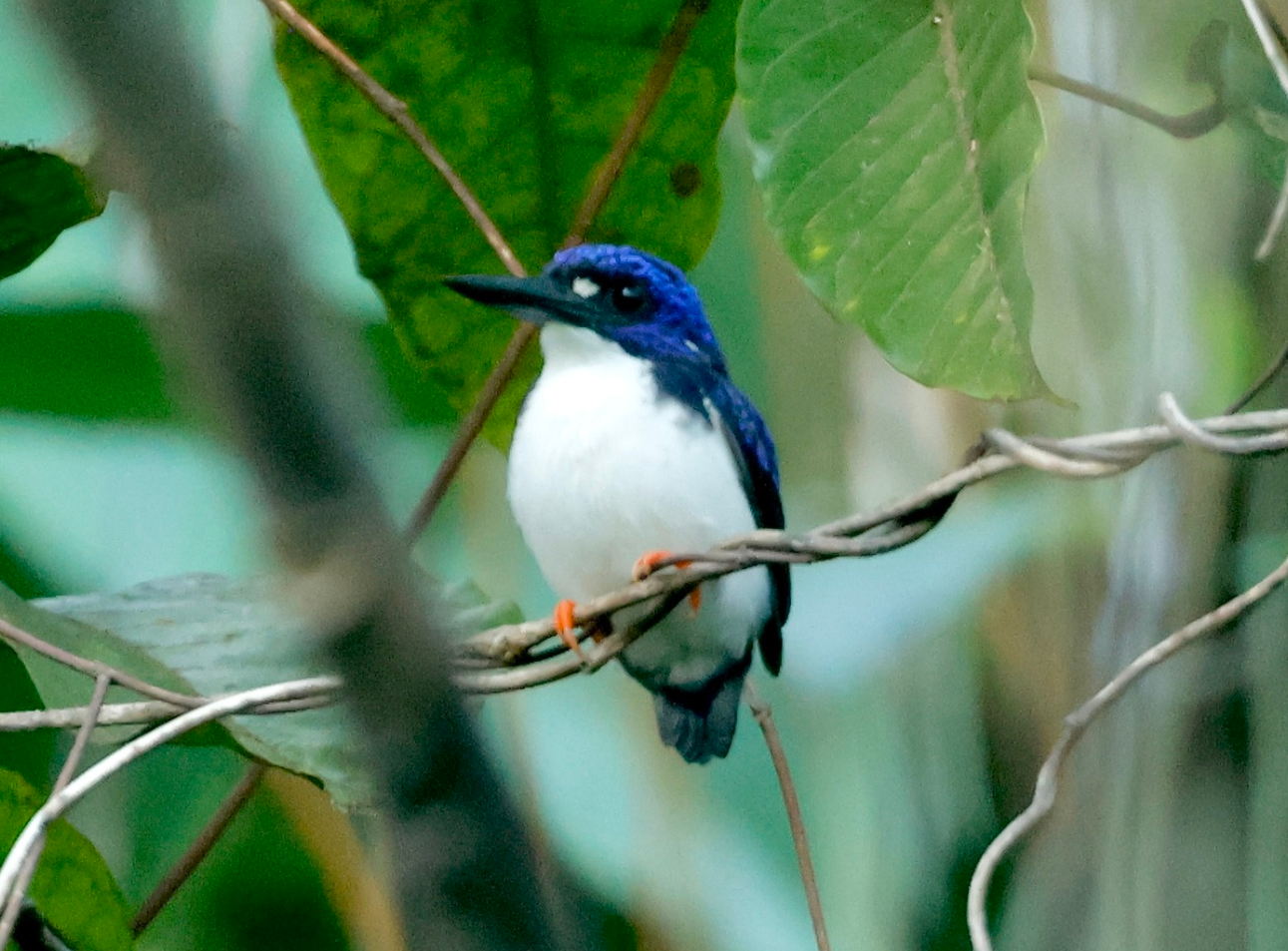

Conservation status
- Least Concern (IUCN 3.1)

Scientific classification
- Kingdom: Animalia
- Phylum: Chordata
- Class: Aves
- Order: Coraciiformes
- Family: Alcedinidae
- Subfamily: Alcedininae
- Genus: Ceyx
- Species: C. gentianus

Binomial name
- Ceyx gentianus Tristram, 1879

= Makira dwarf kingfisher =

Species of bird

The Makira dwarf kingfisher (Ceyx gentianus) is a species of bird in the family Alcedinidae that is endemic to Makira Island. Its natural habitat is subtropical or tropical moist lowland forests.

This species was formerly considered one of the 15 recognised subspecies of what was then known as the variable dwarf kingfisher (Ceyx lepidus or Alcedo lepidus). A molecular phylogenetic study published in 2013 found that most of the insular subspecies had substantially diverged from one another. The variable dwarf kingfisher was therefore split and 12 of the subspecies, including the Makira dwarf kingfisher, were promoted to species status. The name of the variable dwarf kingfisher was simultaneously changed to the Moluccan dwarf kingfisher.

== Taxonomy ==
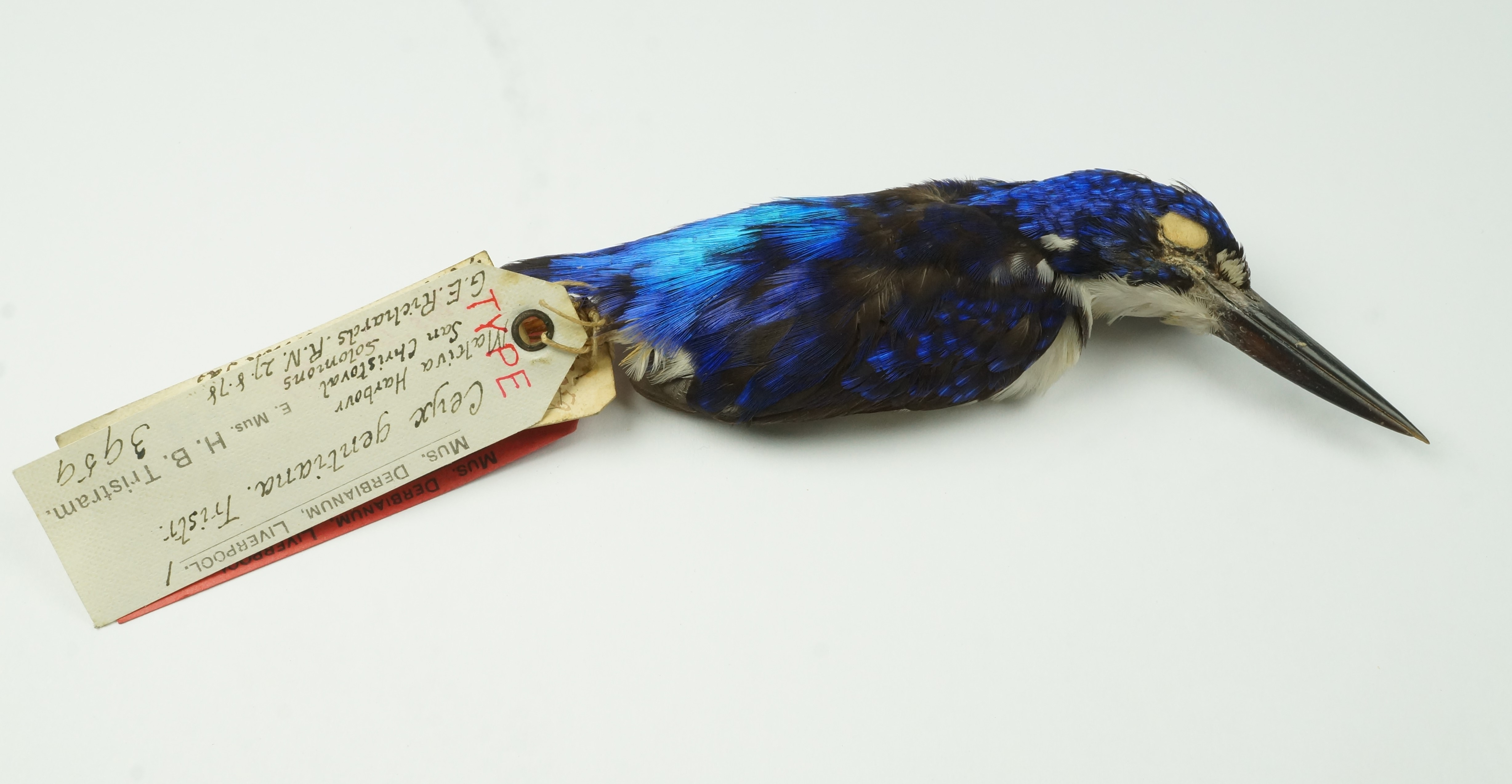
Holotype of Cexy gentiana Tristram (NML-VZ T3959) held at World Museum, National Museums Liverpool.

The holotype of Ceyx gentiana Tristram (Ibis, 1879, p. 438, pl. 11.) is held in the vertebrate zoology collection of National Museums Liverpool at World Museum, with accession number NML-VZ T3959. The specimen was collected in Makira Harbour, San Crisobel (Makira), Solomon Islands, on 27 August 1878 by G. E. Richards. The specimen came to the Liverpool national collection via Henry Baker Tristram's collection which was purchased by the museum in 1896.
