= Malaita dwarf kingfisher =

Scientific classification
- Kingdom: Animalia
- Phylum: Chordata
- Class: Aves
- Order: Coraciiformes
- Family: Alcedinidae
- Subfamily: Alcedininae
- Genus: Ceyx
- Species: C. nigromaxilla
- Subspecies: C. n. malaitae

Trinomial name
- Ceyx nigromaxilla malaitae Mayr, 1935

Subspecies of bird

The Malaita dwarf kingfisher (Ceyx nigromaxilla malaitae), is a subspecies of bird in the family Alcedinidae that is endemic to Malaita Island. Its natural habitat is subtropical or tropical moist lowland forests.

This taxon (now subspecies) was formerly considered as one of the 15 recognised subspecies of what was then known as the variable dwarf kingfisher (Ceyx lepidus or Alcedo lepidus). A molecular phylogenetic study published in 2013 found that most of the insular subspecies had substantially diverged from one another. The variable dwarf kingfisher was therefore split and 12 of the subspecies, including the Malaita dwarf kingfisher, were promoted to species status. At the same time the name of the variable dwarf kingfisher was changed to the Moluccan dwarf kingfisher. Clements and IOC have merged this taxon into the Guadalcanal dwarf kingfisher, Ceyx nigromaxilla.
