= New Ireland dwarf kingfisher =

Conservation status
- Least Concern (IUCN 3.1)

Scientific classification
- Kingdom: Animalia
- Phylum: Chordata
- Class: Aves
- Order: Coraciiformes
- Family: Alcedinidae
- Subfamily: Alcedininae
- Genus: Ceyx
- Species: C. mulcatus

Binomial name
- Ceyx mulcatus Rothschild & Hartert, 1914

Species of bird

The New Ireland dwarf kingfisher (Ceyx mulcatus), is a species of bird in the family Alcedinidae that is endemic to New Hanover Island, New Ireland and the Lihir Islands. Its natural habitat is subtropical or tropical moist lowland forests.

This species was formerly considered as one of the 15 recognised subspecies of what was then known as the variable dwarf kingfisher (Ceyx lepidus or Alcedo lepidus). A molecular phylogenetic study published in 2013 found that most of the insular subspecies had substantially diverged from one another. The variable dwarf kingfisher was therefore split and 12 of the subspecies, including the New Ireland dwarf kingfisher, were promoted to species status. At the same time the name of the variable dwarf kingfisher was changed to the Moluccan dwarf kingfisher.
