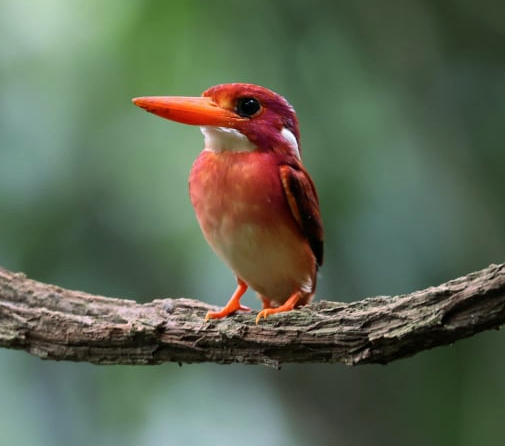

Conservation status
- Vulnerable (IUCN 3.1)

Scientific classification
- Kingdom: Animalia
- Phylum: Chordata
- Class: Aves
- Order: Coraciiformes
- Family: Alcedinidae
- Subfamily: Alcedininae
- Genus: Ceyx
- Species: C. melanurus
- Subspecies: C. m. mindanensis

Trinomial name
- Ceyx melanurus mindanensis Steere, 1890

= South philippine dwarf kingfisher =

Subspecies of bird

The South philippine dwarf kingfisher (Ceyx melanurus mindanensis) is a subspecies of bird in the family Alcedinidae that is endemic to the Philippines found in the islands of Mindanao and Basilan. Its natural habitat is tropical moist lowland forests. It is threatened by habitat loss. It is treated as a separate species by the International Union for Conservation of Nature.

== Taxonomy and description ==
The Philippine dwarf kingfisher is a small mostly orange kingfisher with a red beak and legs, and a white belly. It has a light lilac hue which is more intense in the southern subspecies and has more plain orange wings compared to the dark blue of the other two subspecies of this bird

The Philippine kingfisher was formally described by the German naturalist Johann Jakob Kaup in 1848 under the binomial name Alcedo melanura. The specific epithet is from the Ancient Greek melanouros meaning "with a black tail". The Philippine dwarf kingfisher is now placed in the genus Ceyx that was introduced by the French naturalist Bernard Germain de Lacépède in 1799.

The subspecies C. m. mindanensis is sometimes treated as a separate species, the south Philippine dwarf kingfisher (Ceyx mindanensis), with the nominate and samarensis classified by the Handbook of the Birds of the World as the north Philippine dwarf kingfisher. The two proposed species are differentiated by color and size: north Philippine dwarf kingfishers have dark blue spotted wings and ears and are slightly smaller than south Philippine dwarf kingfishers, which have a more noticeable lilac hue and are overall more uniform orange.

In March 2020 a fledgling of the C. m. mindanensis subspecies was photographed for the first time by the Robert S. Kennedy Conservation Society led by Miguel David De Leon in Cagayan de Oro.

== Habitat and conservation status ==
It is found in lowland primary and secondary forest up to 750 metres (2,460 ft) above sea level. It prefers areas with high rainfall.

As the International Union for Conservation of Nature recognizes it as its own species it has been assessed as a vulnerable species. The Southern subspecies has a lower estimated population of 2,500 to 9,999 mature individuals. This species' main threat is habitat loss with wholesale clearance of forest habitats as a result of logging, agricultural conversion and mining activities occurring within the range.

There are currently no targeted conservation plans for the species. It occurs in a few protected areas throughout its range like the Pasonanca Natural Park and Mount Kitanglad National Park but protection and enforcement from loggers and hunters is still lax.
