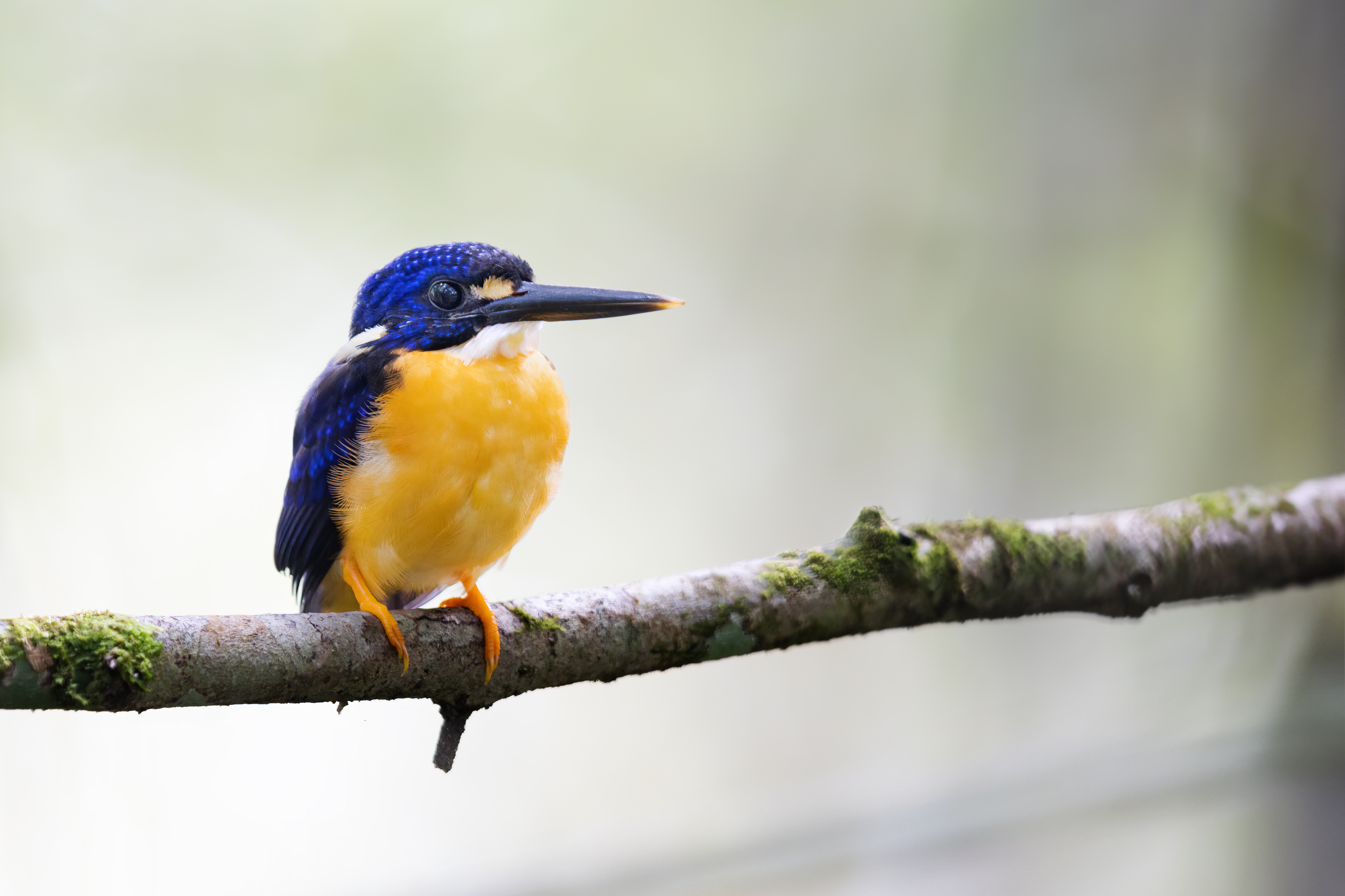

Conservation status
- Least Concern (IUCN 3.1)

Scientific classification
- Kingdom: Animalia
- Phylum: Chordata
- Class: Aves
- Order: Coraciiformes
- Family: Alcedinidae
- Subfamily: Alcedininae
- Genus: Ceyx
- Species: C. solitarius

Binomial name
- Ceyx solitarius Temminck, 1836

= Papuan dwarf kingfisher =

Species of bird

The Papuan dwarf kingfisher (Ceyx solitarius), is a species of bird in the family Alcedinidae that is endemic to the western Papuan islands, New Guinea, Aru Islands and the D'Entrecasteaux Archipelago. Its natural habitat is subtropical or tropical moist lowland forests.

This species was formerly considered one of the 15 recognised subspecies of what was then known as the variable dwarf kingfisher (Ceyx lepidus or Alcedo lepidus). A molecular phylogenetic study published in 2013 found that most of the insular subspecies had substantially diverged from one another. The variable dwarf kingfisher was therefore split and 12 of the subspecies, including the Papuan dwarf kingfisher, were promoted to species status. At the same time the name of the variable dwarf kingfisher was changed to the Moluccan dwarf kingfisher.
