= Sula dwarf kingfisher =

Conservation status
- Near Threatened (IUCN 3.1)

Scientific classification
- Kingdom: Animalia
- Phylum: Chordata
- Class: Aves
- Order: Coraciiformes
- Family: Alcedinidae
- Subfamily: Alcedininae
- Genus: Ceyx
- Species: C. wallacii

Binomial name
- Ceyx wallacii Sharpe, 1868

Species of bird

The Sula dwarf kingfisher (Ceyx wallacii), is a species of bird in the family Alcedinidae that is endemic to the Sula Islands in Indonesia. Its natural habitat is subtropical or tropical moist lowland forests. It was formerly considered to be a subspecies of the variable dwarf kingfisher.

This species was formerly considered one of the 15 recognised subspecies of what was then known as the variable dwarf kingfisher (Ceyx lepidus or Alcedo lepidus). A molecular phylogenetic study published in 2013 found that most of the insular subspecies had substantially diverged from one another. The variable dwarf kingfisher was therefore split and 12 of the subspecies, including the Sula dwarf kingfisher, were promoted to species status. At the same time the name of the variable dwarf kingfisher was changed to the Moluccan dwarf kingfisher.
