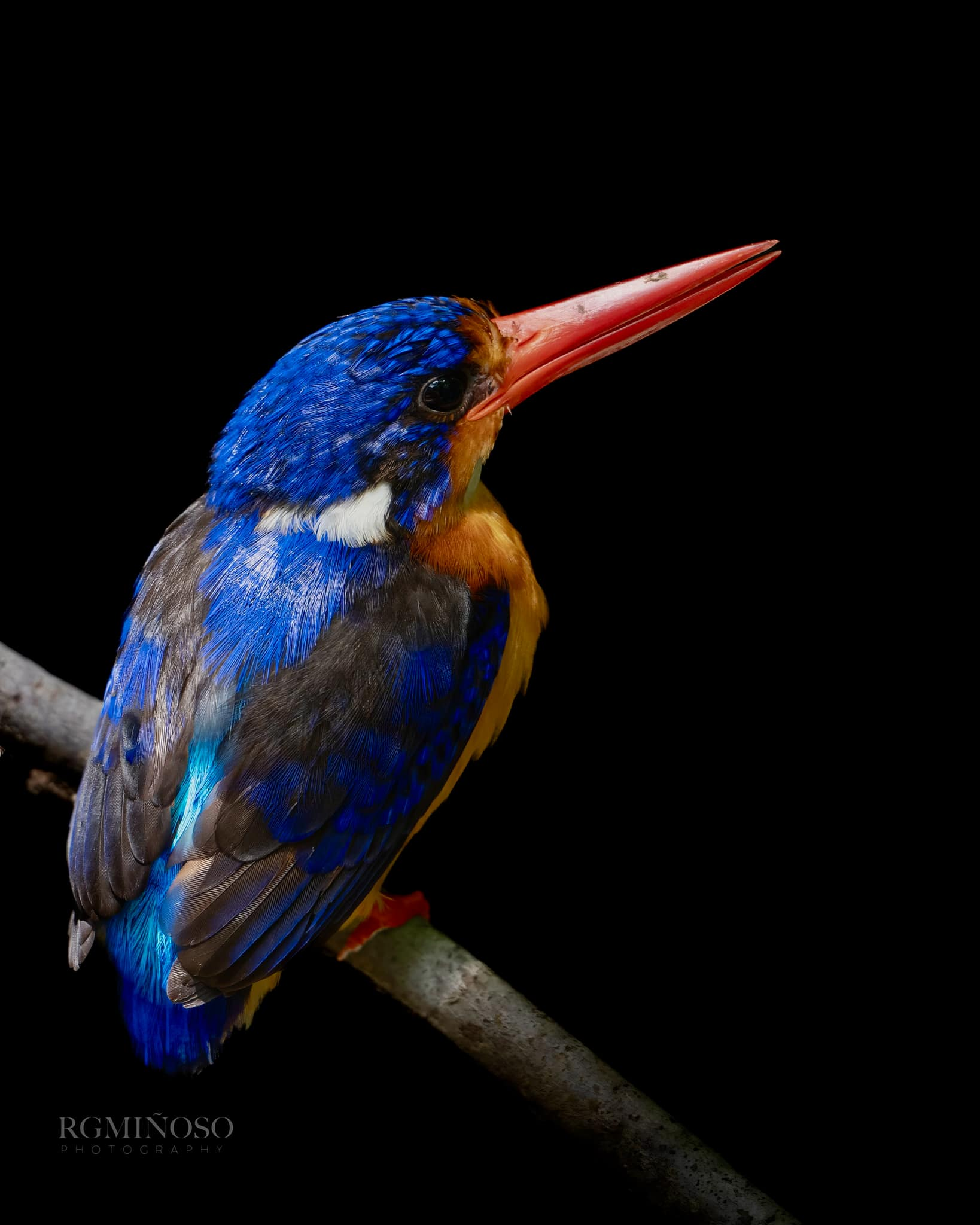
- Dark Morph
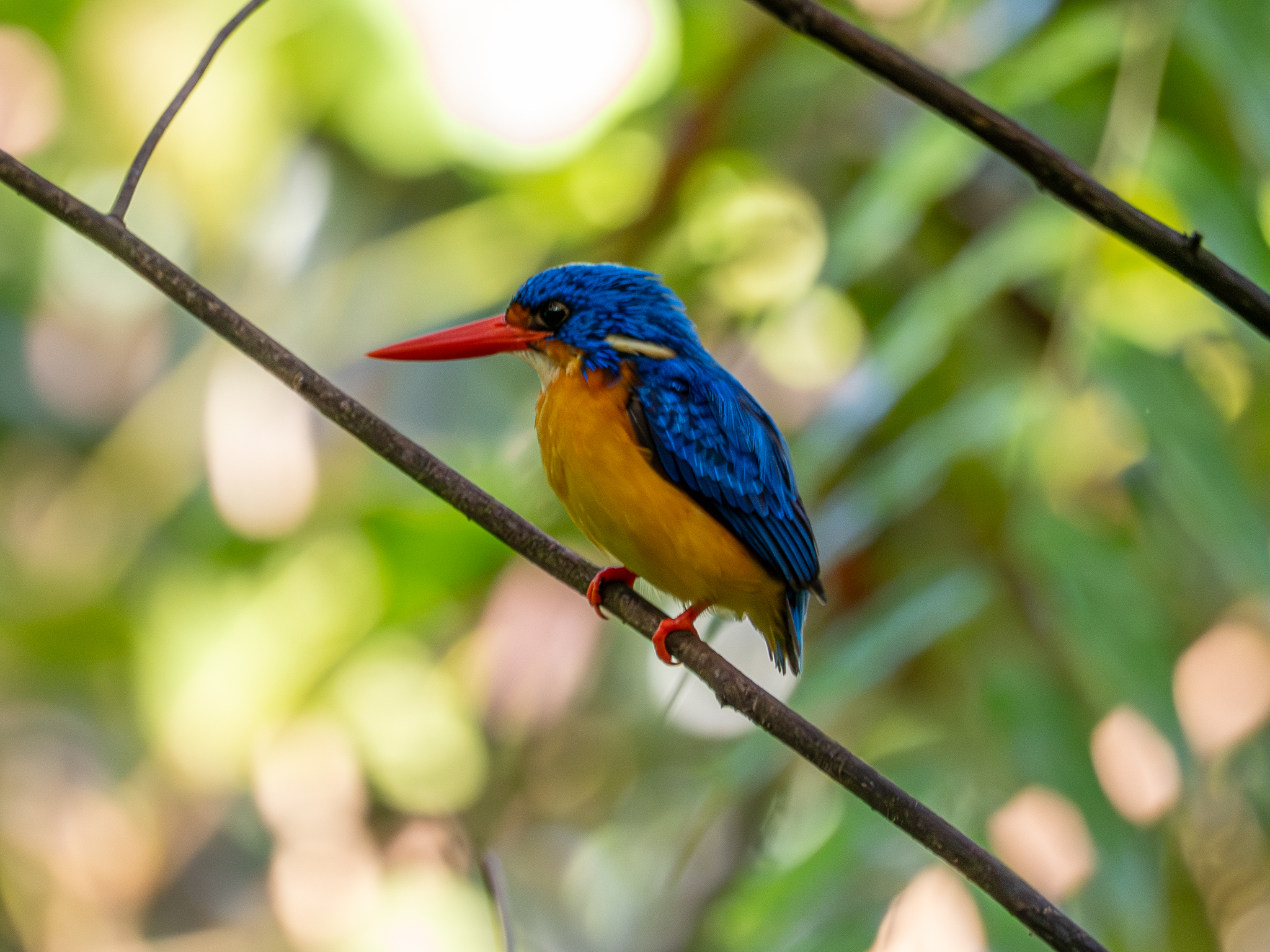
- Light Morph

Conservation status
- Least Concern (IUCN 3.1)

Scientific classification
- Kingdom: Animalia
- Phylum: Chordata
- Class: Aves
- Order: Coraciiformes
- Family: Alcedinidae
- Subfamily: Alcedininae
- Genus: Ceyx
- Species: C. margarethae

Binomial name
- Ceyx margarethae Blasius, W, 1890
- Dimorphic dwarf kingfisher range

= Dimorphic dwarf kingfisher =

Species of bird

The dimorphic dwarf kingfisher (Ceyx margarethae) is a species of bird in the family Alcedinidae that is endemic to the central and southern Philippines. Its natural habitat is tropical moist lowland forests.

== Description and taxonomy ==
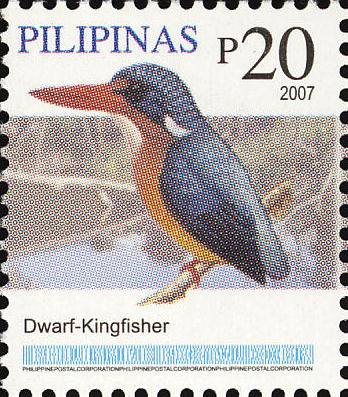
A Dimorphic Dwarf Kingfisher depicted in a 2007 Philippine stamp

This species was formerly considered as one of the 15 recognised subspecies of what was then known as the variable dwarf kingfisher (Ceyx lepidus or Alcedo lepidus). A molecular phylogenetic study published in 2013 found that most of the insular subspecies had substantially diverged from one another. The variable dwarf kingfisher was therefore split and 12 of the subspecies, including the dimorphic dwarf kingfisher, were promoted to species status. At the same time the name of the variable dwarf kingfisher was changed to the Moluccan dwarf kingfisher.

== Ecology and behavior ==
It is presumed to feed on invertebrates, small reptiles and fish. Typically observed alone or as a pair.

Not much is known about their breeding habits. In 2024, a nest was observed on Panay built on the side of a clay cliff. Clutch size was 4 and took 21 days to fledge.

== Habitat and conservation status ==
Its natural habitat is tropical moist lowland forests. To be precise, it inhabits islands such as Negros, Cebu, Camiguin Sur, Mindanao and many other small islands in the central and southern Philippines

IUCN has assessed this bird as least-concern species but the population is decreasing. This species' main threat is habitat loss with wholesale clearance of forest habitats as a result of logging, agricultural conversion and mining activities occurring within the range.
