= Guadalcanal dwarf kingfisher =

Conservation status
- Least Concern (IUCN 3.1)

Scientific classification
- Kingdom: Animalia
- Phylum: Chordata
- Class: Aves
- Order: Coraciiformes
- Family: Alcedinidae
- Subfamily: Alcedininae
- Genus: Ceyx
- Species: C. nigromaxilla

Binomial name
- Ceyx nigromaxilla Rothschild & Hartert, 1905

Species of bird

The Guadalcanal dwarf kingfisher (Ceyx nigromaxilla), is a species of bird in the family Alcedinidae that is endemic to Guadalcanal Island. Its natural habitat is sub-tropical or tropical moist lowland forests.

This species was formerly considered one of the 15 recognised subspecies of what was then known as the variable dwarf kingfisher (Ceyx lepidus or Alcedo lepidus). A molecular phylogenetic study published in 2013 found that most of the insular subspecies had substantially diverged from one another. The variable dwarf kingfisher was therefore split and 12 of the subspecies, including the Guadalcanal dwarf kingfisher, were promoted to species status. At the same time the name of the variable dwarf kingfisher was changed to the Moluccan dwarf kingfisher.

In 2023 the Malaita dwarf kingfisher (Ceyx malaitae) was made a subspecies of the Guadalcanal dwarf kingfisher.
