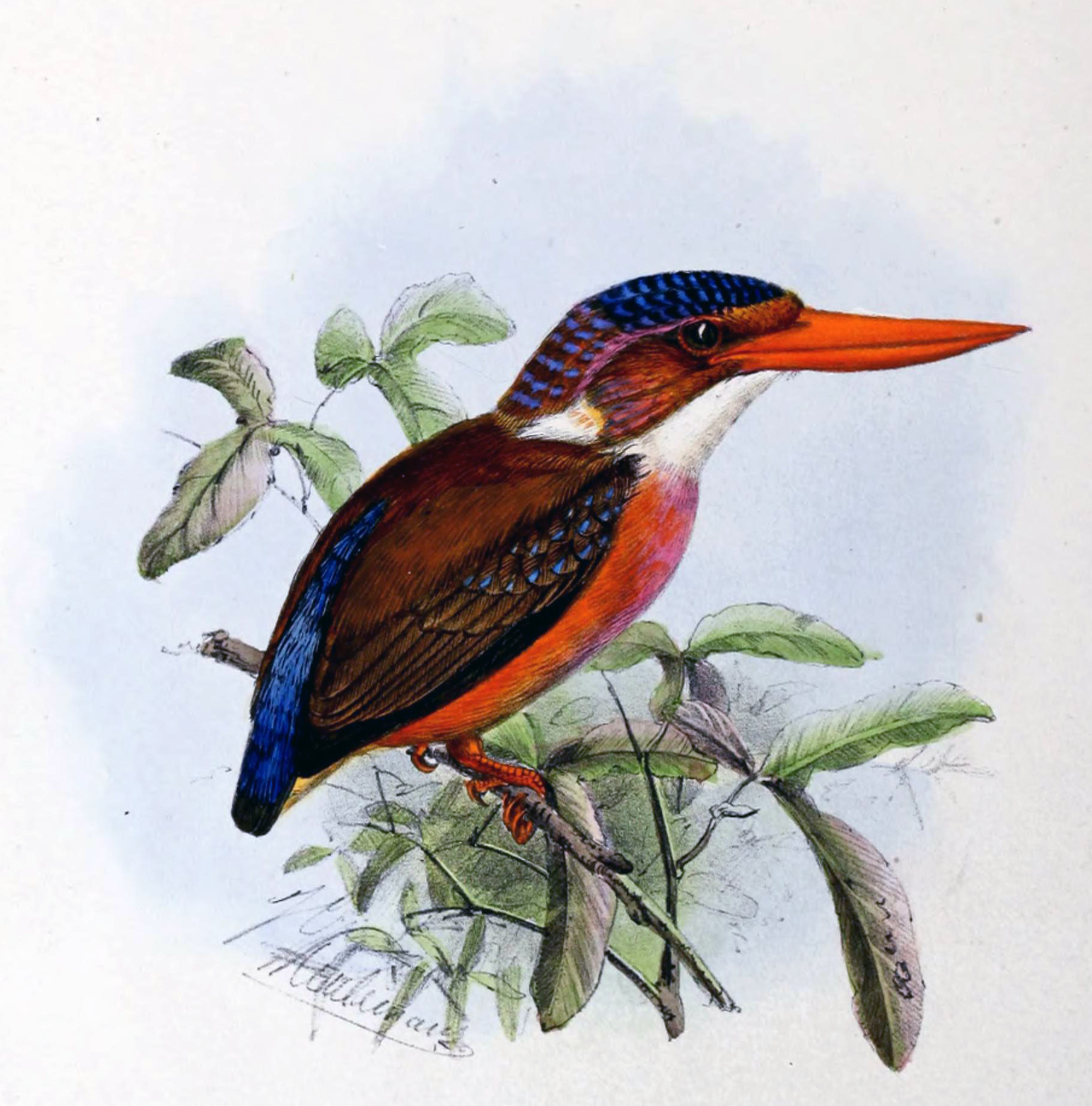

Conservation status
- Critically Endangered (IUCN 3.1)

Scientific classification
- Kingdom: Animalia
- Phylum: Chordata
- Class: Aves
- Order: Coraciiformes
- Family: Alcedinidae
- Subfamily: Alcedininae
- Genus: Ceyx
- Species: C. sangirensis

Binomial name
- Ceyx sangirensis (Meyer, AB & Wiglesworth, 1898)

= Sangihe dwarf kingfisher =

Species of bird

The Sangihe dwarf kingfisher (Ceyx sangirensis) is a species of bird in the family Alcedinidae that is endemic to the Sangihe Islands, Indonesia. Its natural habitat is subtropical or tropical dry forests. It is threatened by habitat loss.

Only six specimens are known, and it has not been definitively recorded since the 1870s, so it has been suggested to be probably extinct.
