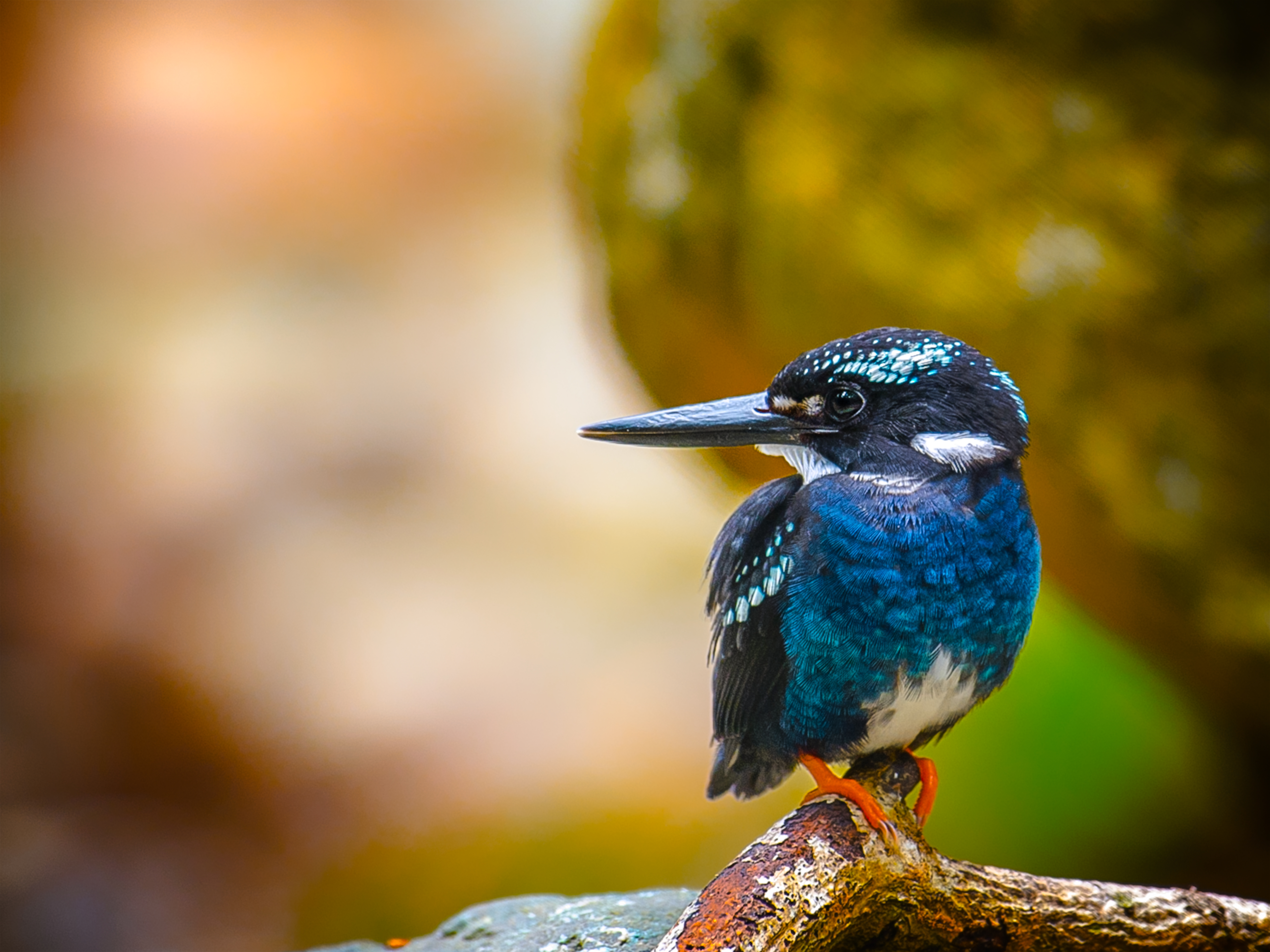

Conservation status
- Near Threatened (IUCN 3.1)

Scientific classification
- Kingdom: Animalia
- Phylum: Chordata
- Class: Aves
- Order: Coraciiformes
- Family: Alcedinidae
- Subfamily: Alcedininae
- Genus: Ceyx
- Species: C. argentatus

Binomial name
- Ceyx argentatus Tweeddale, 1877

Synonyms
- Alcedo argentata

= Southern silvery kingfisher =

Species of bird

The southern silvery kingfisher (Ceyx argentatus) is a species of bird in the family Alcedinidae that is endemic to the Philippines found in Mindanao and Basilan. This species and the northern silvery kingfisher, found in the Visayas, were formerly considered conspecific and called the silvery kingfisher.Its natural habitats are tropical moist lowland forests, streams and rivers. It is threatened by habitat loss.

In the Philippines, it is called kasay-kasay, and figures in the legend concerning the discovery of the Catholic image of Our Lady of Caysasay.

== Description and taxonomy ==
This species is described as a small and dashing kingfisher that is primarily dark blue. It has a bright siilvery-white throat, vent and ear and back with white spots on its wings, head and lores. It has an all black bill and eyes and red feet.

It is differentiated from its northern counterpart by its bluish-white throat, cheek and belly versus the cream-coloured parts of the Northern silvery kingfisher. It also is greenish blue on belly and flanks and is slightly larger. This species is monotypic and has no subspecies.

== Ecology and behavior ==
Diet consists of small fish and crabs. Has also been recorded feeding on insects. Perches on a low branch beside a stream and dives in to catch its prey then returns to its perch.

Not much is known about its breeding behaviour but juveniles and nests have been seen from February to May. Nests in streamside banks.

== Habitat and conservation status ==
It appears to be reliant upon forested streams below 1,000 m and will tolerate secondary and selectively logged forest and even streamside vegetation within coconut plantations, close to forest edge.

IUCN has assessed this bird as near threatened with the population being estimated at 1,500 to 7,000 mature individuals. This species' main threat is habitat loss with wholesale clearance of forest habitats as a result of logging, agricultural conversion and mining activities occurring within the range.

Extensive lowland deforestation throughout its range is the chief threat. Most remaining lowland forest is leased to logging concessions or mining applications. Watercourses with high siltation loads, resulting from deforestation, appear not to hold the species, and riverine pollution is likely to have a similar impact. Forest at Bislig (Mindanao) is being cleared under concession and re-planted with exotic trees for paper production. Conversion of terminalia forest into rice fields and oil palm plantation is driving habitat loss elsewhere.
