= Variable dwarf kingfisher =

Variable dwarf kingfisher is a common name of a group of kingfishers in the genus, Ceyx.

The variable dwarf kingfisher (Ceyx lepidus or Alcedo lepidus) formerly included 15 subspecies. A molecular phylogenetic study published in 2013 found that most of the insular subspecies had substantially diverged from one another. The variable dwarf kingfisher was therefore split and 12 of the subspecies were promoted to species status. At the same time the name of the variable dwarf kingfisher was changed to the Moluccan dwarf kingfisher.

The species in the group are:

- Moluccan dwarf kingfisher, Ceyx lepidus
- Dimorphic dwarf kingfisher, Ceyx margarethae
- Sula dwarf kingfisher, Ceyx wallacii
- Buru dwarf kingfisher, Ceyx cajeli
- Papuan dwarf kingfisher, Ceyx solitarius
- Manus dwarf kingfisher, Ceyx dispar
- New Ireland dwarf kingfisher, Ceyx mulcatus
- New Britain dwarf kingfisher, Ceyx sacerdotis
- North Solomons dwarf kingfisher, Ceyx meeki
- New Georgia dwarf kingfisher, Ceyx collectoris
- Malaita dwarf kingfisher, Ceyx malaitae
- Guadalcanal dwarf kingfisher, Ceyx nigromaxilla
- Makira dwarf kingfisher, Ceyx gentianus
