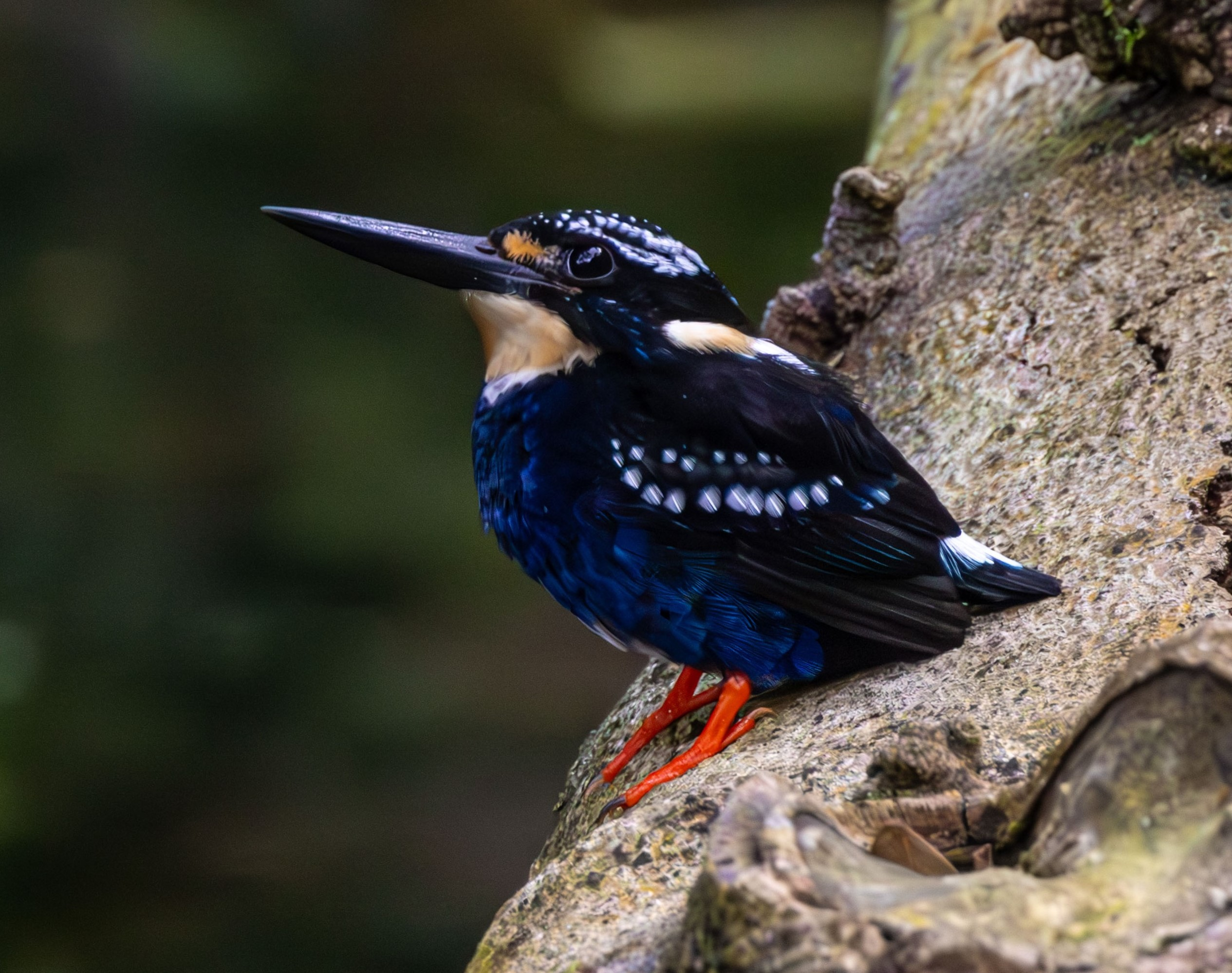

Conservation status
- Near Threatened (IUCN 3.1)

Scientific classification
- Kingdom: Animalia
- Phylum: Chordata
- Class: Aves
- Order: Coraciiformes
- Family: Alcedinidae
- Subfamily: Alcedininae
- Genus: Ceyx
- Species: C. flumenicola

Binomial name
- Ceyx flumenicola Steere, 1890
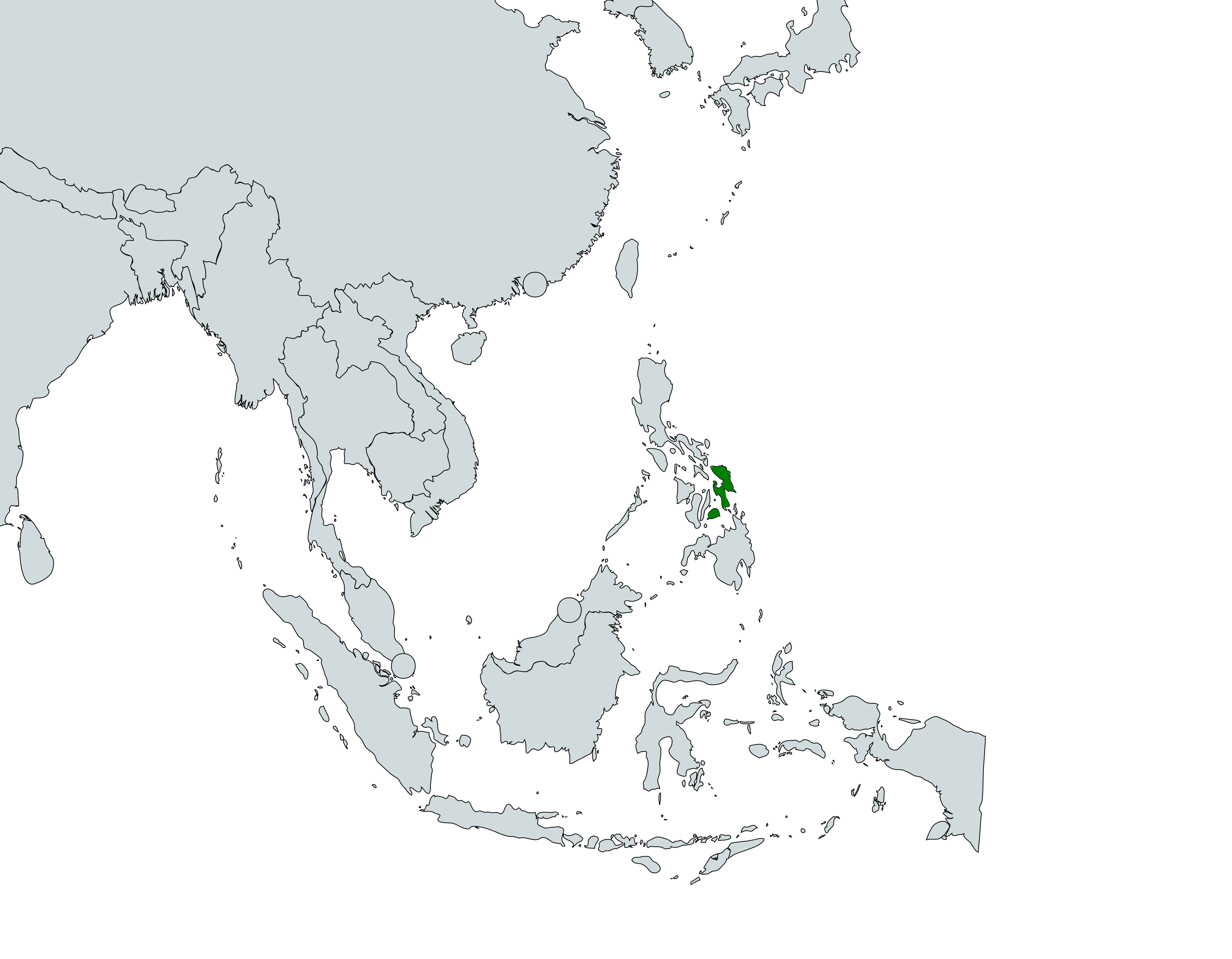

Synonyms
- Alcedo argentatus flumencola

= Northern silvery kingfisher =

Species of bird

The northern silvery kingfisher (Ceyx flumenicola) is a species of bird in the family Alcedinidae that is endemic to the Philippines being found in the Visayas on the islands of Bohol, Leyte and Samar. This species and the southern silvery kingfisher, which is found on Mindanao, were formerly considered conspecific and called the silvery kingfisher. Its natural habitats are tropical moist lowland forests, streams and rivers. It is threatened by habitat loss.

== Description and taxonomy ==
This species is described as a small and dashing kingfisher that is primarily dark blue with purplish underparts. It has a bright siilvery-white belly and back with white spots on its wings and head, It has a cream or buffy throat and chin, ear and lores. It has an all black bill and red feet.

It is differentiated from its southern counterpart by its cream colored throat, cheek and belly versus the bluish-white parts of the Southern silvery kingfisher. It also is rich royal blue on breast and flanks and is slightly smaller. This species is monotypic and has no subspecies.

== Ecology and behavior ==
Diet consists of small fish and crabs. Has also been recorded feeding on insects. Perches on a low branch beside a stream and dives in to catch its prey then returns to its perch.

Not much is known about its breeding behaviour but juveniles and nests have been seen from February to May. Nests in streamside banks.

== Habitat and conservation status ==
It appears to be reliant upon forested streams below 1,000 m and will tolerate secondary and selectively logged forest and even streamside vegetation within coconut plantations, close to forest edge.

IUCN has assessed this bird as near threatened with the population being estimatesd at 1,500 to 7,000 mature individuals. This species' main threat is habitat loss with wholesale clearance of forest habitats as a result of logging, agricultural conversion and mining activities occurring within the range.

Extensive lowland deforestation throughout its range is the chief threat. Only 4% forest cover is estimated to remain on Bohol. Most remaining lowland forest is leased to logging concessions or mining applications. Watercourses with high siltation loads, resulting from deforestation, appear not to hold the species, and riverine pollution is likely to have a similar impact. Tree-cutting, agricultural expansion, including pesticide (specifically Carbofuran) contamination from commercial growing of banana, and soil erosion are all threats to Rajah Sikatuna National Park (Bohol), a key sites for the species. Conversion of terminalia forest into rice fields and oil palm plantation is driving habitat loss elsewhere. Current laws protecting riverine habitats are weak and require revision.

It is found in the Rajah Sikatuna Protected Landscape in Bohol, Samar Island Natural Park on Samar, Kuapnit Balinsasayao National Park on Leyte but actual protection from deforestation are lax.
