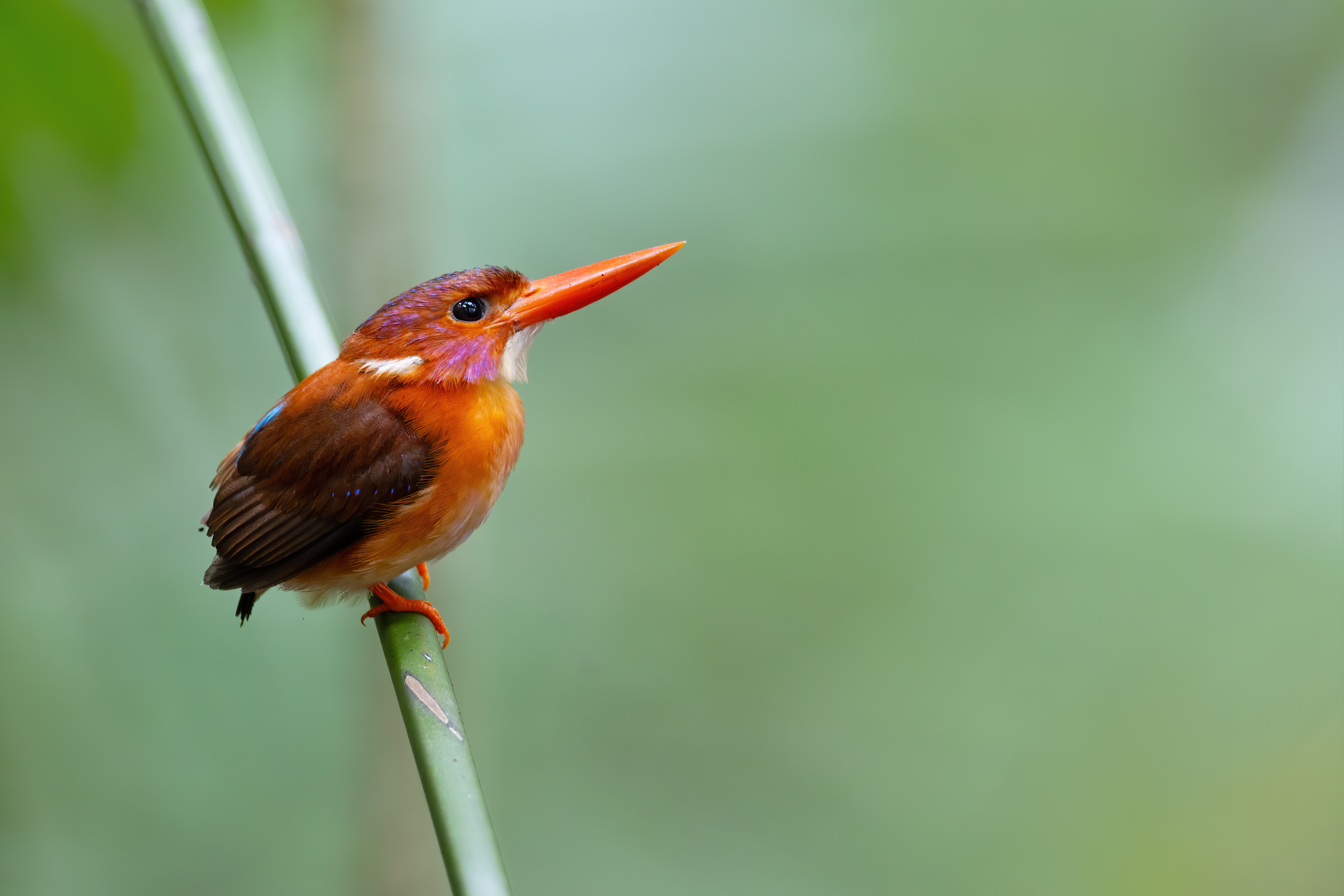

Conservation status
- Least Concern (IUCN 3.1)

Scientific classification
- Kingdom: Animalia
- Phylum: Chordata
- Class: Aves
- Order: Coraciiformes
- Family: Alcedinidae
- Subfamily: Alcedininae
- Genus: Ceyx
- Species: C. fallax

Binomial name
- Ceyx fallax (Schlegel, 1866)

= Sulawesi dwarf kingfisher =

Species of bird

The Sulawesi dwarf kingfisher (Ceyx fallax) is a species of bird in the family Alcedinidae that is endemic to Sulawesi island, Indonesia. The species has numerous common names such as Celebes forest kingfisher, blue-crowned kingfisher, Celebes dwarf-kingfisher, and Celebes pygmy-kingfisher.

Its natural habitat is subtropical or tropical dry forests. It is threatened by habitat loss.
