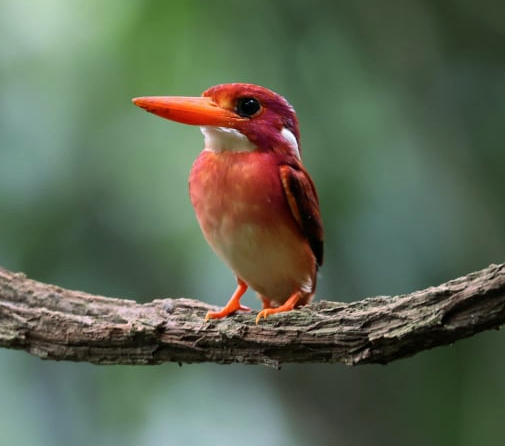
- C. m. mindanensis subspecies in Cagayan de Oro; South Philippine dwarf kingfisher
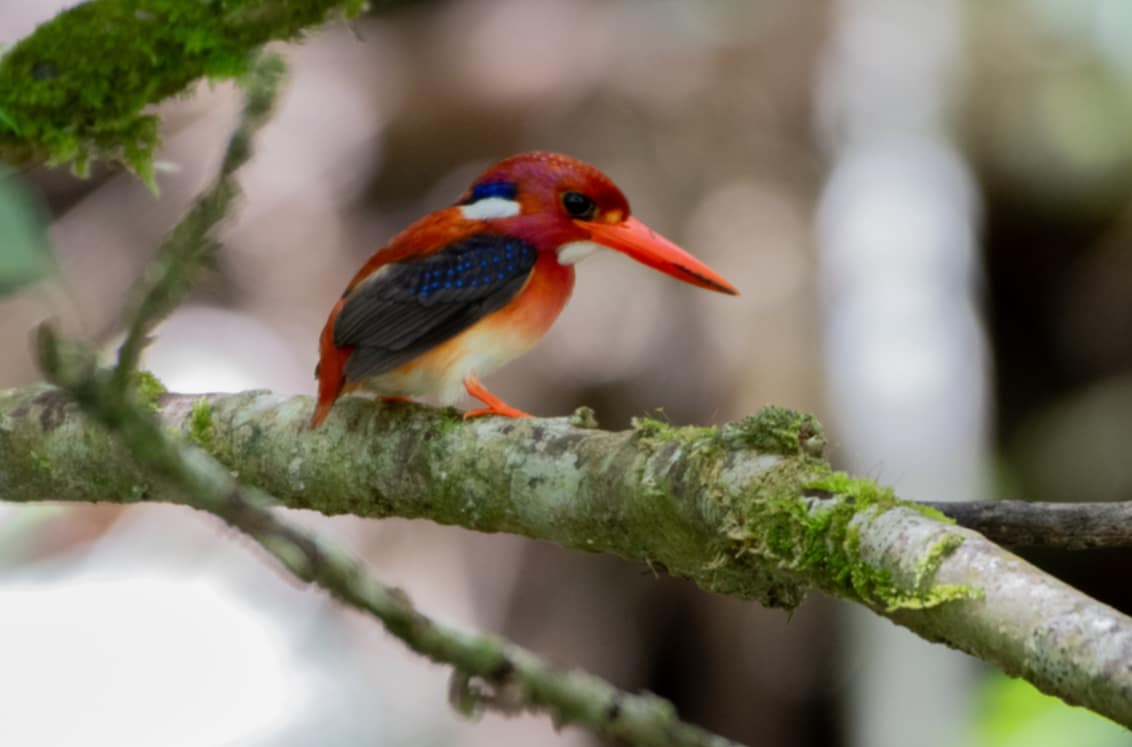
- C. m. melanarus in Quezon; North Philippine dwarf kingfisher

Conservation status
- Least Concern (IUCN 3.1)

Scientific classification
- Kingdom: Animalia
- Phylum: Chordata
- Class: Aves
- Order: Coraciiformes
- Family: Alcedinidae
- Subfamily: Alcedininae
- Genus: Ceyx
- Species: C. melanurus

Binomial name
- Ceyx melanurus (Kaup, 1848)

= Philippine dwarf kingfisher =

Species of bird

The Philippine dwarf kingfisher (Ceyx melanurus) is a species of bird in the family Alcedinidae that is endemic to the Philippines found in the islands of Luzon, Polillo Islands, Catanduanes, Basilan, Samar, Leyte and Mindanao. Its natural habitat is tropical moist lowland forests. Due to differences in plumage, It is recognized by the International Union for Conservation of Nature as two distinct species with the birds from Basilan and Mindanao classified as the South Philippine dwarf kingfisher and the North Philippine dwarf kingfisher for the rest of its range. It is threatened by habitat loss.

The North Philippine dwarf kingfisher (Ceyx melanurus) is a species of bird that is endemic to the Philippine islands. The Philippine dwarf kingfisher is in the Alcedindae family. Its bright red beak and mostly orange feathers make it stand out in the Philippine rainforest.The International Union for Conservation of Nature recognizes this bird as two distinct species. They are classified as regions where their habitat is located. These two species are called the North Philippine dwarf kingfisher and the South Philippine dwarf kingfisher.

== Taxonomy and description ==
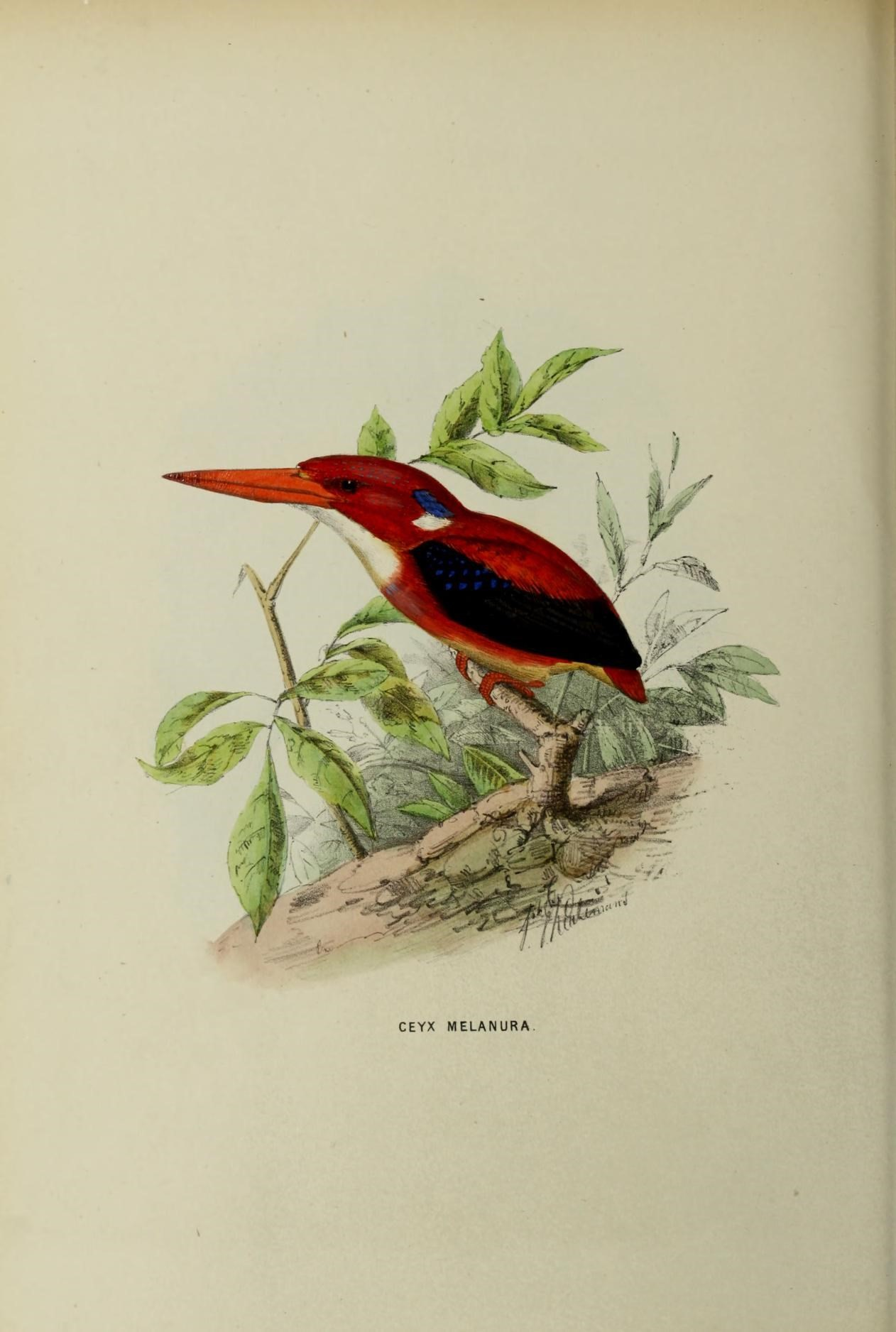
Illustration of the nominate subspecies by John Gerrard Keulemans

This bird was first described by German naturalist Johann Jakob in 1848 during expeditions to the Philippine Islands. The North Philippine Dwarf kingfisher is small with a bright red beak. Its colors consist of orange and white belly with red legs. It has a light lilac hue which is more vibrant in the southern species than the northern species. The northern species of this bird has dark blue spotted wings. The legs are bright orange or reddish with a long sharp red bill. When calling, their voice is high pitched and sharp.

=== Subspecies ===
Three subspecies are recognised:

- C. m. melanurus (Kaup, 1848) – Luzon, Polillo, Alabat and Catanduanes (north Philippines)
- C. m. samarensis Steere, 1890 – Samar and Leyte (east central Philippines)
- C. m. mindanensis Steere, 1890 – Mindanao and Basilan (south Philippines)

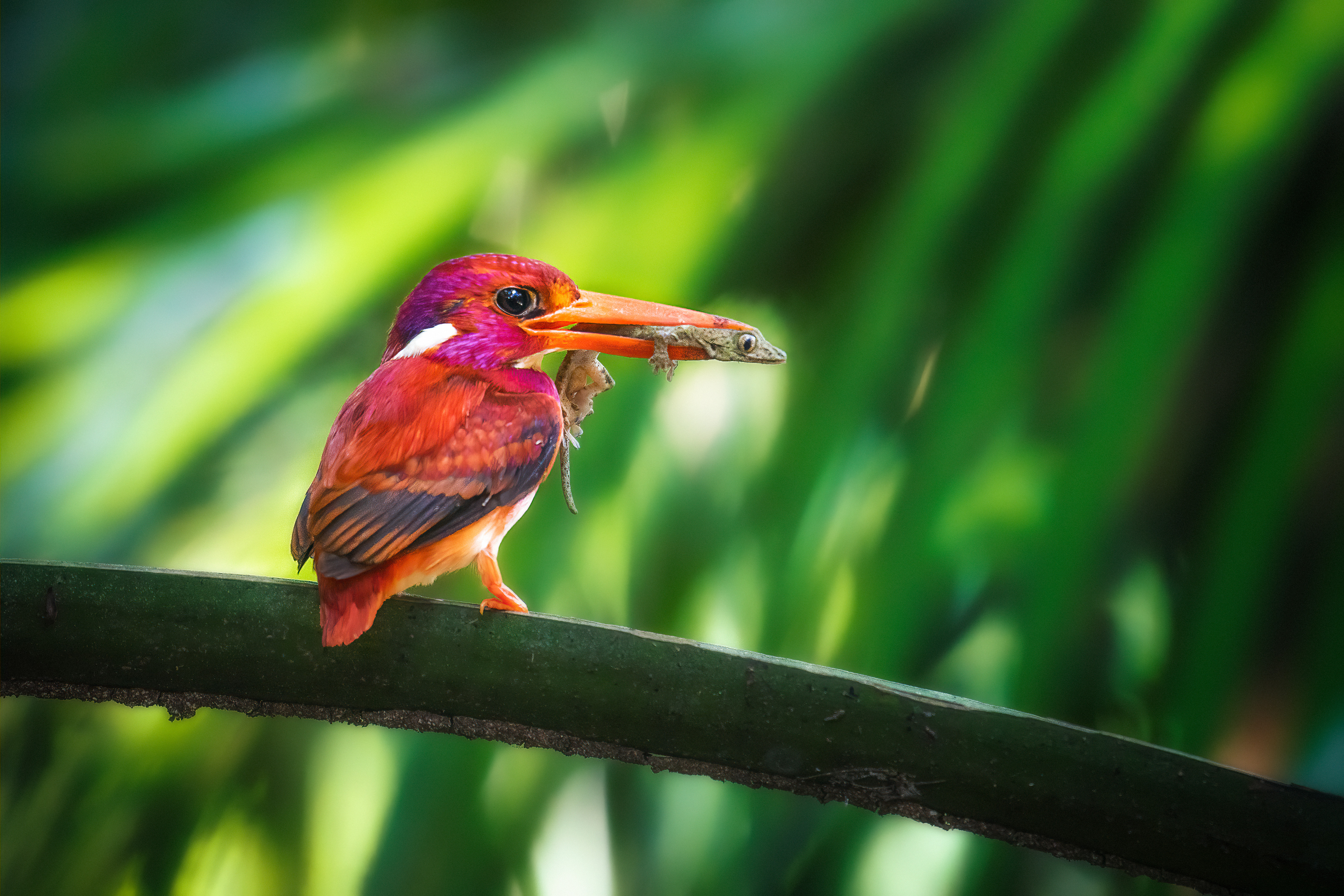
The subspecies mindandanensis with a gecko to be fed to its fledglings.

The subspecies C. m. mindanensis is sometimes treated as a separate species, the south Philippine dwarf kingfisher (Ceyx mindanensis), with the nominate and samarensis classified by the Handbook of the Birds of the World as the north Philippine dwarf kingfisher. The two proposed species are differentiated by color and size: north Philippine dwarf kingfishers have dark blue spotted wings and ears and are slightly smaller than south Philippine dwarf kingfishers, which have a more noticeable lilac hue and are overall more uniform orange.

== Ecology ==
The North Philippine Dwarf kingfisher have an elongated beak due to them living in the dense rainforest. Over Time, The North Philippine Dwarf kingfisher has evolved to have an elongated beak to make foraging for food in the dense rainforest easier. They hunt on the forest floor and have to pick through the dense rainforest to eat. This bird's main source of nutrition comes from leaf litter, small worms, insects, and spiders. As a predator to many small insects and to aquatic organisms it helps regulate population levels and prevent outbreaks from pests that could harm local vegetation. Another benefit the elongated beak proposes is the ability to strike at prey with speed and precision. The North Philippine Dwarf kingfisher is quick and agile, but it is not immune to predators like snakes, raptors, and lizards that also call the rainforest of the Philippines home. The thing that endangers this bird the most is the habitat loss due to deforestation, illegal logging, and agricultural expansion into the rainforest.

== Habitat ==
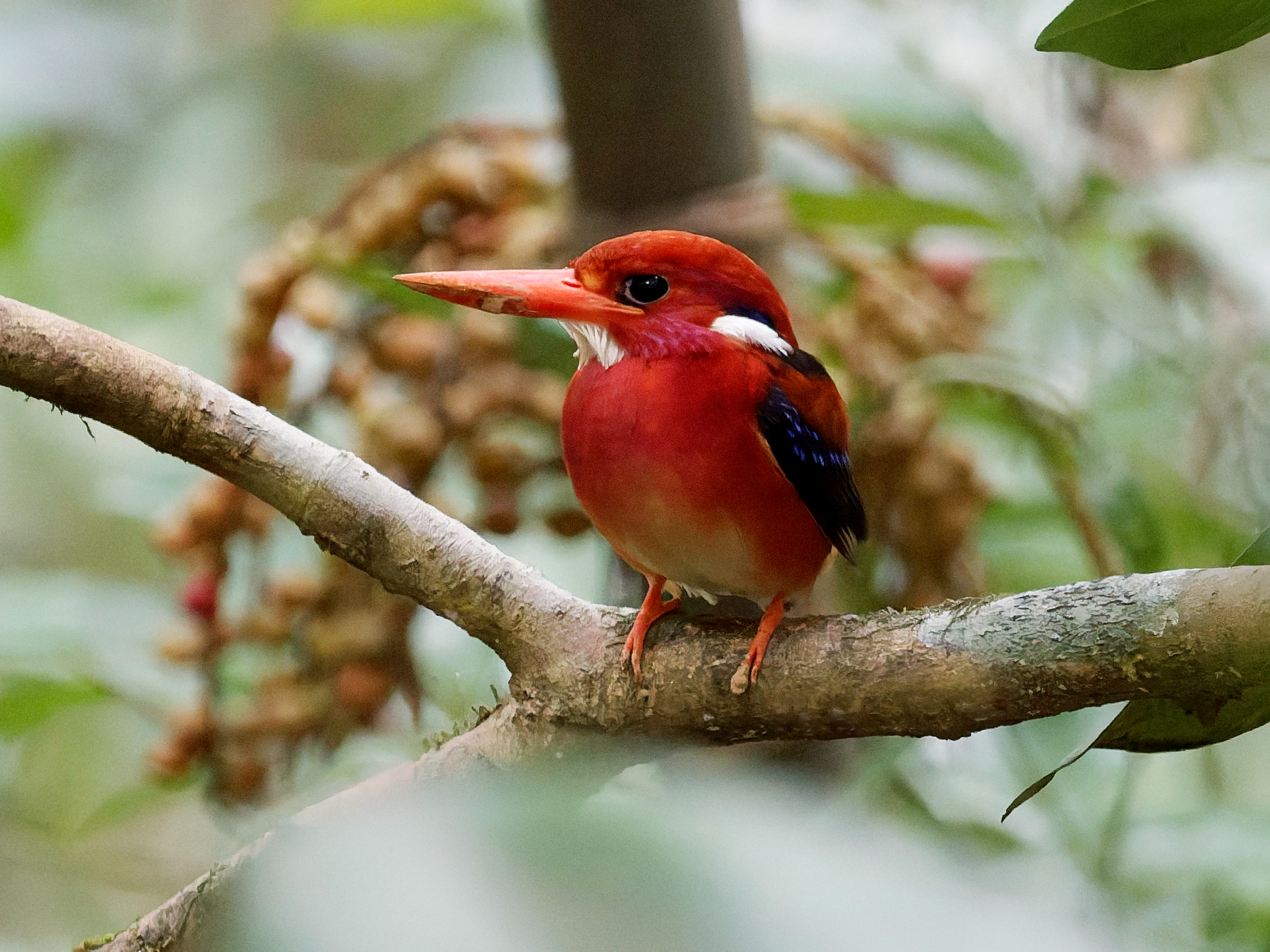
The subspecies samarensis in Samar.

The North Philippine Dwarf kingfisher species has a combined occurrence area of around 400,000 km. The areas where this species occurs are mainly the Philippine islands of Luzon, Polillo Islands, Catanduanes, Samar Leyte, and Mindanao. The North Philippine Dwarf kingfisher prefers areas of high rainfall for a habitat. They are seen near some waterways and low lying areas of water but are most seen in the dense rainforest.

== Conservation ==
Currently the IUCN red list has this species listed as least concerned. However, this species is currently facing a breeding endemic that is driving the loss of population numbers. The North Philippine Dwarf kingfisher has seen an unprecedented population loss of around 20% over the last decade. This is due to deforestation and unregulated logging taking place in the rainforest. As a forest dependent species The North Philippine Dwarf kingfisher has seen an increasing challenge to find suitable living conditions and easy access to nutrition.
