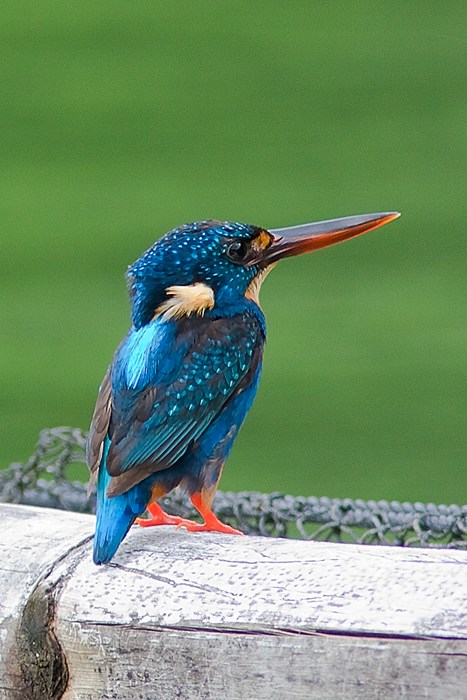
- A male Northern indigo-banded kingfisher

Conservation status
- Least Concern (IUCN 3.1)

Scientific classification
- Kingdom: Animalia
- Phylum: Chordata
- Class: Aves
- Order: Coraciiformes
- Family: Alcedinidae
- Subfamily: Alcedininae
- Genus: Ceyx
- Species: C. cyanopectus

Binomial name
- Ceyx cyanopectus Lafresnaye, 1840

Subspecies
- C. c. cyanopectus - Lafresnaye, 1840; C. c. nigrirostris - Bourns & Worcester, 1894

Synonyms
- Alcedo cyanopecta Lafresnaye, 1840 [orth. error]; Alcedo cyanopectus

= Indigo-banded kingfisher =

Species of bird

The Indigo-banded kingfisher (Ceyx cyanopectus) is a species of bird in the family Alcedinidae. It is endemic to the Philippines found on the islands of Luzon, Mindoro, Masbate and the Western Visayas region. Some authorities consider this to be two separate species namely the birds from Western Visayas as the South indigo banded kingfisher and the birds from Luzon, Mindoro and Masbate as the North indigo banded kingfisher. Its habitat are in streams in tropical moist lowland forest. It is declining in population due to habitat loss and degradation.

== Description and taxonomy ==
=== Subspecies ===
Two subspecies are recognized:

- C. c. cyanopectus — Known as the Northern Indigo banded Kingfisher; Found on Luzon, Polillo, Mindoro, Sibuyan, Masbate and Ticao,
- C. c. nigriostris -— Known as the Southern Indigo banded Kingfisher; Found on Panay, Negros and Cebu, though possibly extinct on Cebu or was listed as an error.

Southern birds have an all-black bill, while northern ones have a red lower bill and more blue on the sides. The Handbook of the Birds of the World considers them as separate species.

== Ecology and behaviour ==
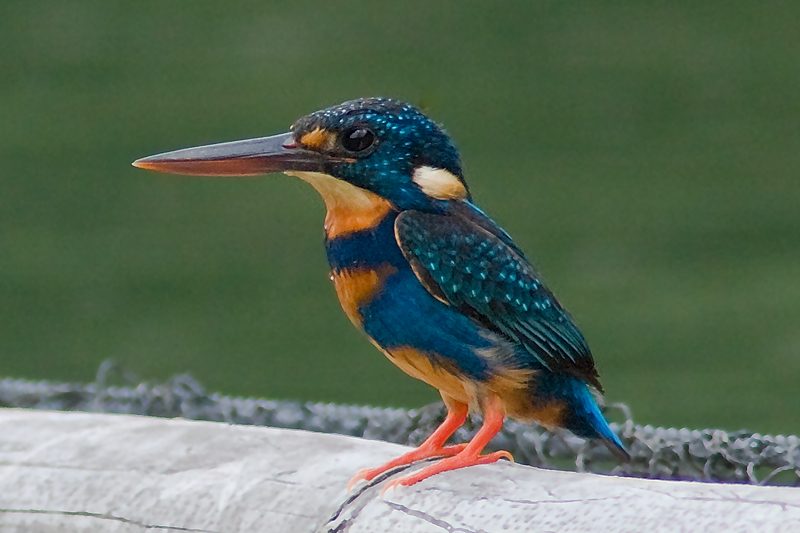
A male Northern indigo-banded kingfisher

The indigo-banded kingfisher feeds on fish and aquatic insects. It perches on rocks and overhanging branches and foliage and dives steeply into the water to catch its prey. Once caught, it returns the prey to the perch where it is beaten and swallowed. Little is known about its breeding behaviour, although it is known to nest in tunnels dug into the banks of streams and rivers.

== Habitat and conservation status ==
Its natural habitat is tropical moist lowland forests up to 1,500 meters above sea level but usually much lower. It prefers streams and rivers with densely forested banks. It is somewhat tolerant of secondary forests.

The International Union for Conservation of Nature recognizes the Northern and Southern indigo-banded kingfisher as separate species thus has an assessment for each.

=== Northern indigo-banded kingfisher (C. c. cyanopectus) ===
The global population size has not been quantified, but the species is described as generally rather common. It is classified as a Least-concern species with the population believed to be decreasing.

=== Southern Indigo-banded kingfisher (C. c. nigrirostris) ===
Southern indigo-banded kingfisher

Conservation status
- Near Threatened (IUCN 3.1)

Scientific classification
- Kingdom: Animalia
- Phylum: Chordata
- Class: Aves
- Order: Coraciiformes
- Family: Alcedinidae
- Subfamily: Alcedininae
- Genus: Ceyx
- Species: C. amethystinus
- Subspecies: C. a. nigrirostris

Trinomial name
- Ceyx amethystinus nigrirostris Bourns & Worcester, 1894

Considered uncommon in its range. Negros is one of the most deforested islands in the country with just 4% remaining forest cover in 1988 and is only found in the remnant forests. Range in Panay has not been fully surveyed but they may persist in larger numbers. IUCN estimates the population to be 1,000 - 2,499 mature individuals with the population continuing to decline.

Both subspecies are declining due to habitat loss and deforestation. There are no targeted conservation programs for either sub-species.

Conservation actions proposed is further surveys especially for the more threatened Southern subspecies to be able to better understand its population and biology.
