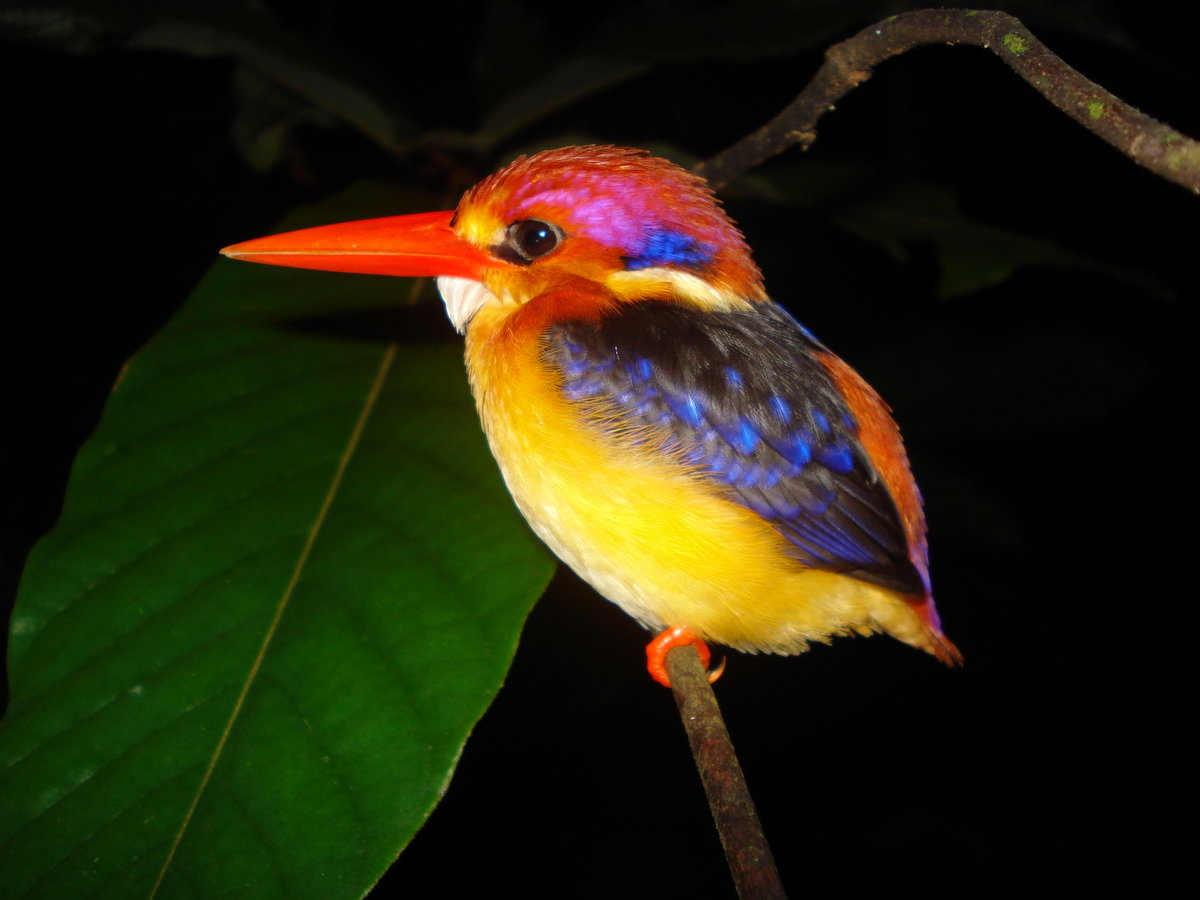
- Oriental dwarf kingfisher (Ceyx erithaca)

Scientific classification
- Kingdom: Animalia
- Phylum: Chordata
- Class: Aves
- Order: Coraciiformes
- Family: Alcedinidae
- Subfamily: Alcedininae
- Genus: Ceyx; Lacépède, 1799

Type species
- Alcedo tridactyla Pallas, 1769

Species
- see text

= Ceyx (bird) =

Genus of birds

Ceyx (from Ancient Greek: Κήυξ, romanized: Kḗux) is an Old World genus of river kingfishers. These kingfishers are found from South East Asia to the Solomon Islands.

== Taxonomy ==
The genus Ceyx was introduced by the French naturalist Bernard Germain de Lacépède in 1799, and derives its name from the Greek myth of Alcyone and Ceyx. The type species is the black-backed dwarf kingfisher (Ceyx erithaca).

A molecular phylogenetic study of the alcedinine kingfishers published in 2007 found that the genera as then defined did not form monophyletic groups. The species were subsequently rearranged into four monophyletic genera. The little kingfisher, azure kingfisher, Bismarck kingfisher, southern silvery kingfisher and Indigo-banded kingfisher were moved from Alcedo to Ceyx. All except one of the birds in the reconstituted genus have three rather than the usual four toes. The exception is the Sulawesi dwarf kingfisher which retains a vestigial fourth toe.

The Moluccan dwarf kingfisher (Ceyx lepidus) was previous named the variable dwarf kingfisher and included 15 recognised subspecies. A genetic study published in 2013 found that most of the subspecies had substantially diverged from one another. The species was therefore split and 12 of the subspecies were promoted to species status. At the same time the name was changed from the variable dwarf kingfisher to the Moluccan dwarf kingfisher.

The two African species in the genus Ispidina were sometimes placed in this genus. Compared to the related species in the genus Alcedo they are more terrestrial.

== Species ==
There are 23 species in the genus:

Genus Ceyx – Lacépède, 1799 – twenty three species
Common name	Scientific name and subspecies	Range	Size and ecology	IUCN status and estimated population
Black-backed dwarf kingfisher	Ceyx erithaca (Linnaeus, 1758) Two subspecies: C. e. erithaca (Linnaeus, 1758); C. e. macrocarus Oberholser, 1917	Indian Subcontinent and Mainland Southeast Asia.	Size: Habitat: Diet:	NT
Rufous-backed dwarf kingfisher	Ceyx rufidorsa Strickland, 1847 Five subspecies: C. r. rufidorsa Strickland, 1847; C. r. motleyi Chasen & Kloss, 1929; C. r. captus Ripley, 1941; C. r. jungei Ripley, 1942; C. r. vargasi Manuel, 1939	Southeast Asia (Malay peninsula, Indonesian archipelago, Lubang & Mindoro in the Philippines)	Size: Habitat: Diet:	LC
Philippine dwarf kingfisher	Ceyx melanurus (Kaup, 1848) Three subspecies: C. m. melanurus (Kaup, 1848); C. m. samarensis Steere, 1890; C. m. mindanensis Steere, 1890	Philippines (Luzon, Polillo Islands, Catanduanes, Basilan, Samar, Leyte and Mindanao)	Size: Habitat: Diet:	VU
Celebes forest kingfisher, blue-crowned kingfisher, Celebes dwarf-kingfisher, and Celebes pygmy-kingfisher.	Ceyx fallax (Schlegel, 1866)	Sulawesi, Indonesia.	Size: Habitat: Diet:	LC
Sangihe dwarf kingfisher	Ceyx sangirensis (Meyer, AB & Wiglesworth, 1898)	Sangihe Islands, Indonesia	Size: Habitat: Diet:	CR
Moluccan dwarf kingfisher	Ceyx lepidus Temminck, 1836 Two subspecies: C. l. uropygialis - Gray, GR, 1861; C. l. lepidus - Temminck, 1836	The Moluccas	Size: Habitat: Diet:	LC
Dimorphic dwarf kingfisher	Ceyx margarethae Blasius, W, 1890	Central and Southern Philippines (On islands such as Negros, Cebu, Camiguin Sur & Mindanao)	Size: Habitat: Diet:	LC
Sula dwarf kingfisher	Ceyx wallacii Sharpe, 1868	Sula Islands in Indonesia.	Size: Habitat: Diet:	LC
Buru dwarf kingfisher	Ceyx cajeli (Wallace, 1863)	Buru Island in Indonesia	Size: Habitat: Diet:	NT
Papuan dwarf kingfisher	Ceyx solitarius Temminck, 1836	New Guinea, Aru Islands and the D'Entrecasteaux Archipelago.	Size: Habitat: Diet:	LC
Manus dwarf kingfisher	Ceyx dispar Rothschild & Hartert, 1914	Admiralty Islands	Size: Habitat: Diet:	NT
New Ireland dwarf kingfisher	Ceyx mulcatus Rothschild & Hartert, 1914	New Hanover Island, New Ireland and the Lihir Islands	Size: Habitat: Diet:	LC
New Britain dwarf kingfisher	Ceyx sacerdotis Ramsay, EP, 1882	New Britain and Umboi Island.	Size: Habitat: Diet:	LC
North Solomons dwarf kingfisher	Ceyx meeki Rothschild, 1901 Two subspecies: C. m. meeki - Rothschild, 1901; C. m. pallidus - Mayr, 1935	west and central Solomon Islands	Size: Habitat: Diet:	LC
New Georgia dwarf kingfisher	Ceyx collectoris (Rothschild & Hartert, 1901)	west central Solomon Islands	Size: Habitat: Diet:	LC
Guadalcanal dwarf kingfisher	Ceyx nigromaxilla (Rothschild & Hartert, 1905) Two subspecies: C. n. malaitae - Mayr, 1935; C. n. nigromaxilla	Guadalcanal Island.	Size: Habitat: Diet:	LC
Makira dwarf kingfisher	Ceyx gentianus Tristram, 1879	Makira Island	Size: Habitat: Diet:	LC
Indigo-banded kingfisher	Ceyx cyanopectus Lafresnaye, 1840 Two subspecies: C. c. cyanopectus - Lafresnaye, 1840; C. c. nigrirostris - Bourns & Worcester, 1894	Philippines (Luzon, Mindoro, Masbate and the Western Visayas)	Size: Habitat: Diet:	LC
Southern silvery kingfisher	Ceyx argentatus Tweeddale, 1877	Philippines (Mindanao and Basilan.)	Size: Habitat: Diet:	NT
Northern silvery kingfisher	Ceyx flumenicola Steere, 1890	Philippines (the Visayas on the islands of Bohol, Leyte and Samar.)	Size: Habitat: Diet:	NT
Azure kingfisher	Ceyx azureus (Latham, 1801) Seven subspecies: C. a. azureus Latham, 1801; C. a. ruficollaris (Bankier, 1841); C. a. diemenensis (Gould, 1846); C. a. lessonii (Cassin, 1850); C. a. affinis (G.R. Gray, 1860); C. a. yamdenae (Rothschild, 1901); C. a. ochrogaster (Reichenow, 1903)	northern and eastern Australia and Tasmania, as well as the lowlands of New Guinea	Size: Habitat: Diet:	LC
Bismarck kingfisher	Ceyx websteri (Hartert, 1898)	Papua New Guinea.	Size: Habitat: Diet:	VU
Little kingfisher	Ceyx pusillus Temminck, 1836 Nine subspecies: C. p. halmaherae Salomonsen, 1934; C. p. pusillus Temminck, 1836; C. p. laetior Rand, 1941; C. p. masauji Mathews, 1941; C. p. bougainvillei Ogilvie-Grant (, 1914); C. p. richardsi Tristam, 1882; C. p. aolae Ogilvie-Grant, 1914; C. p. ramsayi North, 1912; C. p. halli Mathews, 1912	Australia (northern Queensland and coastal Northern Territory), Indonesia, Papua New Guinea, and the Solomon Islands	Size: Habitat: Diet:	LC

== Sources ==
- Fry, C. Hilary; Fry, Kathie; Harris, Alan (1992). Kingfishers, Bee-eaters, and Rollers. London: Christopher Helm. ISBN 978-0-7136-8028-7.
