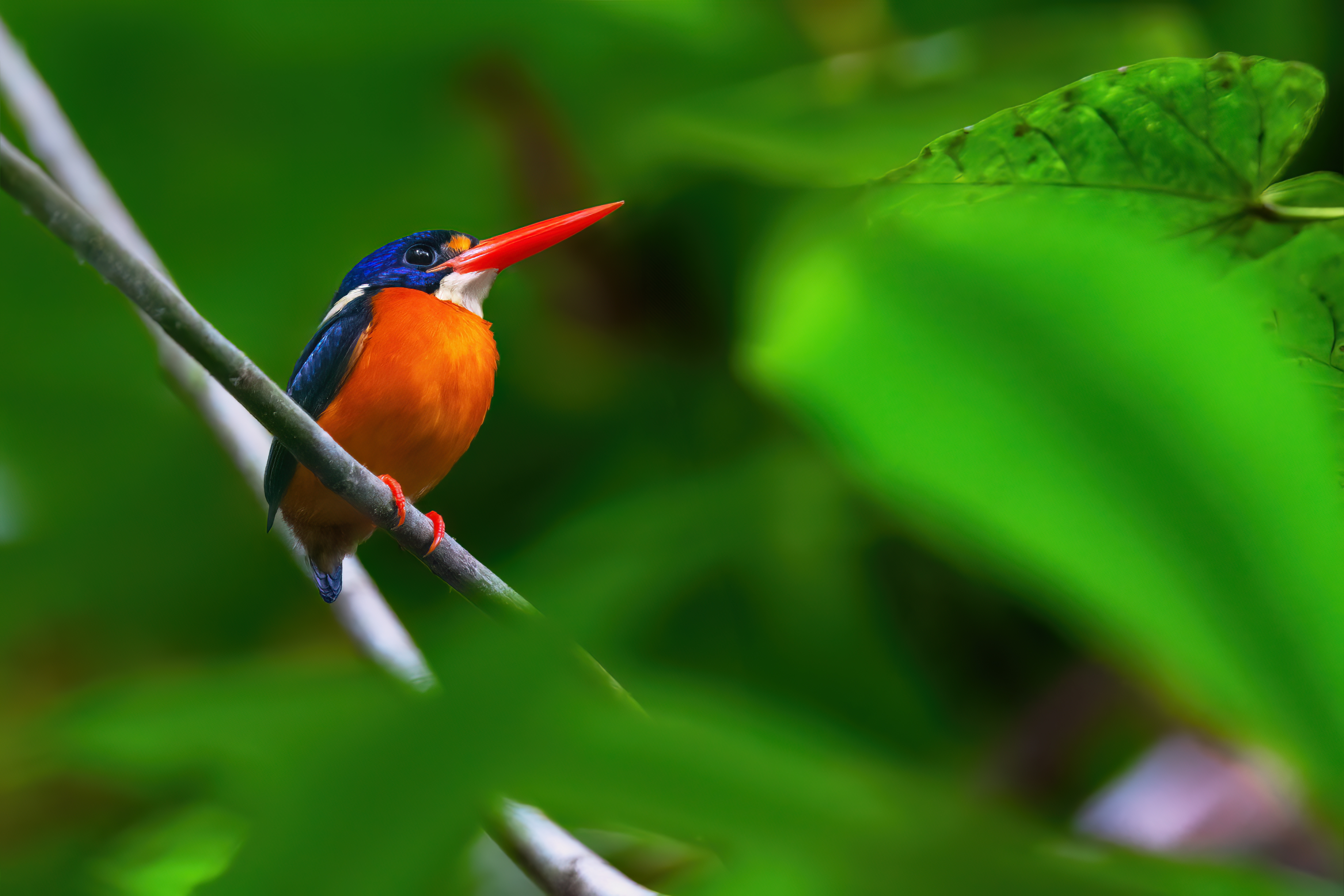
- Ceyx lepidus

Conservation status
- Least Concern (IUCN 3.1)

Scientific classification
- Kingdom: Animalia
- Phylum: Chordata
- Class: Aves
- Order: Coraciiformes
- Family: Alcedinidae
- Subfamily: Alcedininae
- Genus: Ceyx
- Species: C. lepidus

Binomial name
- Ceyx lepidus Temminck, 1836

Subspecies
- C. l. uropygialis - Gray, GR, 1861; C. l. lepidus - Temminck, 1836

= Moluccan dwarf kingfisher =

Species of bird

Moluccan Dwarf-Kingfisher with prey

The Moluccan dwarf kingfisher (Ceyx lepidus), formerly known as the variable dwarf kingfisher, is a species of bird in the family Alcedinidae.

== Taxonomy ==
This species was previous named the variable dwarf kingfisher and had 15 recognised subspecies. A molecular phylogenetic study published in 2013 found that most of the taxa had substantially diverged from each other. The species was therefore split and 12 of the subspecies were promoted to species status. At the same time the name was changed to the Moluccan dwarf kingfisher. Some taxonomic authorities further split this species into the Seram dwarf kingfisher, and refer to the other group as the North Moluccan dwarf kingfisher. The Seram dwarf kingfisher is then limited to the southern Moluccas.

== Distribution ==
This species is endemic to the Moluccas.

== Habitat ==
It is a sylvan species. Its natural habitats are subtropical or tropical moist lowland forests, shrubland, wetlands, abandoned plantations and dense vegetation along streams.

== Description ==
Ceyx lepidus can reach a body length of about 14 cm (5.5 in). These small birds show a brilliant blue-black basic color. Juveniles show a slightly less blue color than adults. In adult the forehead is marked with an orange spot surrounded by black. A white triangle is present on the side of the neck. The throat is usually white or yellowish-white, The bill is orange-red and the eyes are dark brown. The entire underside is bright orange. The end of the tail is black. The yellow-orange legs consist of only three toes (tridactyl feet). The appearance is similar in males and females.

== Biology ==
These birds are solitary and insectivorous. They usually prey dragonflies and other insects by means of a rapid, direct flight over the forest pools. The coupled pair dig a short gallery in an embankment, a bank or between the roots of an overturned tree. The gallery leads to a laying chamber in which the female lays two eggs.
