= List of Coraciiformes by population =

This is a list of Coraciiformes species by global population. While numbers are estimates, they have been made by the experts in their fields. For more information on how these estimates were ascertained, see Wikipedia's articles on population biology and population ecology.

This list is incomprehensive, as not all Coraciiformes have had their numbers quantified.

The IOC World Bird List (version 15.1) recognizes 186 species of Coraciiformes. This list follows IUCN classifications for species names. Where IUCN classifications differ from other ornithological authorities, alternative names are noted.

== Species by global population ==
Common name	Binomial name	Population	Status	Trend	Notes	Image
Guam kingfisher	Todiramphus cinnamominus	0	EW	NA	Last wild individual was observed in 1988. There are approximately 135 individuals currently held in captivity.	
Sangihe dwarf kingfisher	Ceyx sangirensis	1-249	CR	▼		
Javan blue-banded kingfisher	Alcedo euryzona	50-249	CR	▼	Note that IOC taxonomy splits an additional species, the Malaysian blue-banded kingfisher, from this species. IUCN/BirdLife International maintain both species within A. euryzona.	
Tuamotu kingfisher (Mangareva kingfisher)	Todiramphus gambieri	100-150	CR	Steady	Surveys in 2019 estimated 173 individuals in total. Note that IOC taxonomy splits an additional species, the Niau kingfisher, from this species. IUCN/BirdLife International maintain both species within T. gambieri.	
Marquesas kingfisher (Marquesan kingfisher)	Todiramphus godeffroyi	350	CR	▼	Numbered 695 in 2003. Numbered approximately 350 mature individuals in 2014.	
Kofiau paradise kingfisher	Tanysiptera ellioti	350 - 1,500	NT	▼	Population is considered "very unlikely to number fewer than 1,000 mature individuals."	
Sula dwarf kingfisher	Ceyx wallacii	580-5,800	NT	▼	Best estimate for number of mature individuals is 2,500-5,000.	
Southern indigo-banded kingfisher	Ceyx nigrirostris	1,000-2,499	NT	▼	Note that IOC taxonomy maintains this species as a single species with the Northern indigo-banded kingfisher under C. cyanopectus, as indigo-banded kingfisher.	
Manus dwarf kingfisher	Ceyx dispar	1,100-5,600	NT	▼	Best estimate for number of mature individuals is 2,500-5,000. Total population is estimated to be 1,700-8,500 individuals.	
Northern silvery kingfisher	Ceyx flumenicola	1,200-6,000	NT	▼	Best estimate for number of mature individuals is 2,500-5,000. Total population is estimated to be 1,800-9,000 individuals.	
Moustached kingfisher	Actenoides bougainvillei	1,300-7,000	LC	▼	Best estimate for number of mature individuals is 2,500-5,000.	
Southern silvery kingfisher	Ceyx argentatus	1,300-13,000	NT	▼	Best estimate for number of mature individuals is 2,500-9,999. Total population is estimated to be 2,000-20,000 individuals.	
Keel-billed motmot	Electron carinatum	1,500-7,000	VU	▼		
Scaly ground-roller	Geobiastes squamiger	1,500-7,000	VU	▼		
Azure dollarbird	Eurystomus azureus	1,500-7,000	NT	▼	Possibly up to 2,500-9,999 individuals based on an assessment of known records, descriptions of abundance and range size.	
Palau kingfisher (Rusty-capped kingfisher)	Todiramphus pelewensis	2,100-3,300	NT	?	Best estimate for number of mature individuals is 2,700. Total population is estimated to be ~ 4,100 individuals.	
Mangaia kingfisher (Mewing kingfisher)	Todiramphus ruficollaris	2,100-3,500	LC	Steady	Best estimate for number of mature individuals is 2,700. May have been underestimated in previous surveys.	
Bismarck kingfisher	Ceyx websteri	2,500-9,999	VU	▼		
Rufous-lored kingfisher (Winchell's kingfisher)	Todiramphus winchelli	2,500-9,999	VU	▼	Values given are a preliminary estimate from this species' 2016 assessment. Current 2025 assessment lists the population as "unknown."	
New Britain kingfisher (White-mantled kingfisher)	Todiramphus albonotatus	2,500-9,999	NT	▼		
Numfor paradise-kingfisher	Tanysiptera carolinae	2,500-9,999	NT	▼		
Blue-black kingfisher	Todiramphus nigrocyaneus	2,500-9,999	NT	▼		
Chattering kingfisher	Todiramphus tutus	2,500-9,999	NT	▼		
Blyth's kingfisher	Alcedo hercules	2,500-9,999	NT	▼		
Talaud kingfisher	Todiramphus enigma	3,000-15,000	NT	▼		
Buru dwarf kingfisher	Ceyx cajeli	4,000-20,000	NT	▼	Best estimate for number of mature individuals is 4,000-9,999. Total population is estimated to be 6,000-30,000 individuals.	
Cinnamon-banded kingfisher	Todiramphus australasia	9,250-18,500	LC	▼	Best estimate for number of mature individuals is 12,000-18,000. Total population is estimated to be 14,000-28,000 individuals.	
Long-tailed ground-roller	Uratelornis chimaera	9,487-32,687	VU	▼	Values given are a 95% confidence interval around the estimate of 21,124 mature individuals.	
Pohnpei kingfisher	Todiramphus reichenbachii	10,000-19,999	VU	▼		
Short-legged ground-roller	Brachypteracias leptosomus	10,000-25,000	VU	▼		
Sombre kingfisher	Todiramphus funebris	10,000-25,000	LC	▼	Best estimate for number of mature individuals is 15,000-25,000. Total population is estimated to be 15,000-35,000 individuals.	
San Cristobal dwarf kingfisher (Makira dwarf kingfisher)	Ceyx gentianus	10,000-30,000	LC	Steady		
Blue-capped kingfisher (Hombron's kingfisher)	Actenoides hombroni	10,000 - 99,999	LC	▼	"The population size of this species is unknown. The population probably still numbers tens of thousands of individuals."	
Lazuli kingfisher	Todiramphus lazuli	12,000 - 18,000	LC	Steady	Best estimate for number of mature individuals is 15,000.	
Vanuatu kingfisher	Todiramphus farquhari	14,000-94,000	NT	▼		
Blue-throated motmot	Aspatha gularis	20,000-49,999	LC	▼		
Tody motmot	Hylomanes momotula	20,000-49,999	LC	▼		
Blue-capped motmot (Blue-crowned motmot)	Momotus coeruliceps	20,000-49,999	LC	▼		
Sangihe lilac kingfisher	Cittura sanghirensis	21,000-78,000	LC	Steady	Total population is estimated to be 42,200–97,400 individuals.	
Brown-winged kingfisher	Pelargopsis amauroptera	25,000-35,000	NT	▼		
Russet-crowned motmot	Momotus mexicanus	50,000-499,999	LC	▼		
Whooping motmot	Momotus subrufescens	50,000-499,999	LC	Steady		
Tahiti kingfisher (Society kingfisher)	Todiramphus veneratus	100,000-199,999	NT	▼		
European roller	Coracias garrulus	100,000-499,999	LC	▼		
Blue-cheeked bee-eater	Merops persicus	150,000-400,000	LC	▲		
Broad-billed motmot	Electron platyrhynchum	500,000-4,999,999	LC	▼		
Turquoise-browed motmot	Eumomota superciliosa	500,000-4,999,999	LC	▼		
Blue-diademed motmot (Lesson's motmot)	Momotus lessonii	500,000-4,999,999	LC	▼		
Amazon kingfisher	Chloroceryle amazona	500,000-4,999,999	LC	▼		
American pygmy-kingfisher	Chloroceryle aenea	500,000-4,999,999	LC	▼		
Green-and-rufous kingfisher	Chloroceryle inda	500,000-4,999,999	LC	▼		
Rainbow bee-eater	Merops ornatus	670,000	LC	Steady	Estimated to number at least 1 million individuals in 2008.	
Common kingfisher	Alcedo atthis	716,000-1,760,000	LC	▼		
Belted kingfisher	Megaceryle alcyon	1,800,000	LC	Steady		
Rufous motmot	Baryphthengus martii	5,000,000-49,999,999	LC	▼		
European bee-eater	Merops apiaster	18,400,000-28,000,000	LC	Steady		
Green kingfisher	Chloroceryle americana	20,000,000	LC	▼		
Ringed kingfisher	Megaceryle torquata	20,000,000	LC	Steady		

== Species without population estimates ==
Common name	Binomial name	Population	Status	Trend	Notes	Image
North Philippine dwarf kingfisher (Philippine dwarf kingfisher)	Ceyx melanurus	unknown	LC	▼	"Range covers nearly 80,000 km^{2}... global population size is unlikely to be small."	
Amazonian motmot	Momotus momota	unknown	LC	▼		

== See also ==
- Lists of birds by population
- Lists of organisms by population
