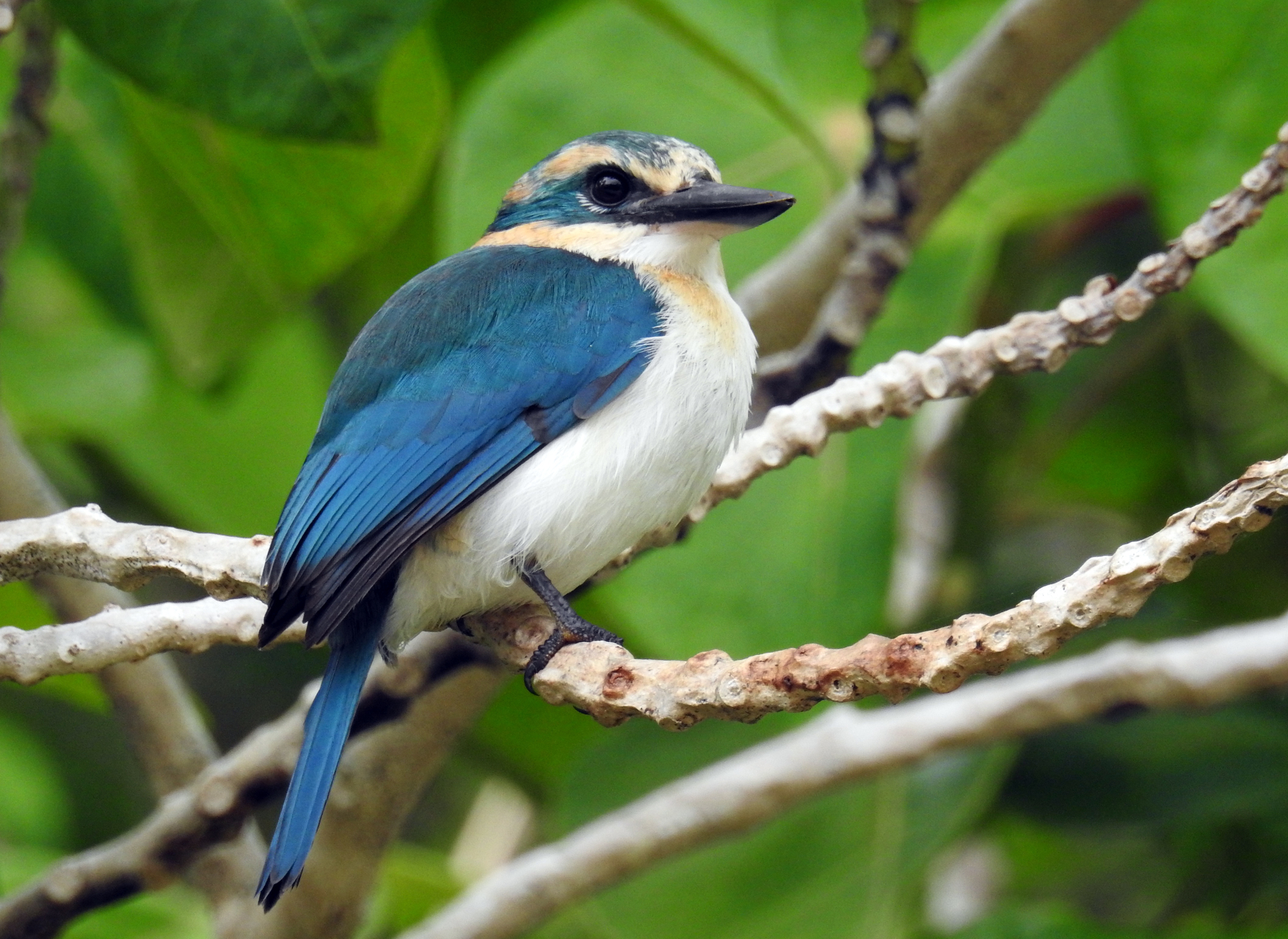

Conservation status
- Least Concern (IUCN 3.1)

Scientific classification
- Kingdom: Animalia
- Phylum: Chordata
- Class: Aves
- Order: Coraciiformes
- Family: Alcedinidae
- Subfamily: Halcyoninae
- Genus: Todiramphus
- Species: T. ruficollaris

Binomial name
- Todiramphus ruficollaris (Holyoak, 1974)

Synonyms
- Todirhamphus ruficollaris (Holyoak, 1974) [orth. error]; Halcyon mangaia; Halcyon ruficollaris; Halcyon tuta ruficollaris; Todirhamphus tuta ruficollaris

= Mewing kingfisher =

Species of bird

The mewing kingfisher or Mangaia kingfisher (Todiramphus ruficollaris), known locally as the tanga'eo, is a species of bird in the Alcedinidae, or kingfisher family. It is endemic to Mangaia in the Cook Islands. Its natural habitats are subtropical or tropical moist lowland forests and plantations.

== Description ==
The mewing kingfisher is 22 cm (8.7 in) in length, with blue-green forehead and crown; light turquoise ear-coverts; orange-buff superciliary buff, nape, and upper mantle; deep turquoise back, rump, and uppertail-coverts; deep blue tail (underside blackish); entirely white underparts (except for orange-buff across upper chest); mostly black bill and iris; mostly black legs with light yellow soles. The orange-buff suffusion across the upper chest is more pronounced in females.

Similar to many birds on islands with low species richness, the mewing kingfisher has evolved smaller flight muscles and longer legs, giving it an extraordinarily low forelimb-hindlimb index.

== Behavior ==
The mewing kingfisher feeds upon worms, caterpillars, grubs, termites, grasshoppers, stick insecks, cockroaches, moths, spiders, and lizards, with lizards being especially valued during courtship feeding. Breeding season begins in early October with last fledglings in early February.

Polygamous behavior has been documented in the mewing kingfisher, with polyandrous trios (two males, one female) being more common although polygynous behavior (one male, two females) was also observed.

Its song is heard as a brief series of "tangar-eeoOO", from which its Maori name is derived, also represented as "ki-wow". Other calls of the Mangaia kingfisher include "kek-kek-kek-kek" during contact with a mate or as a territorial call, "scrark" when chasing off intruders, "chucka-chucka" when reestablishing contact with a mate, and "tui-tui" during copulation.

Like its relatives the Marquesan kingfisher, Sombre kingfisher, and Niau kingfisher, the mewing kingfisher makes frequent use of coconut agriculture for its habitat. It has also been observed nesting in Barringtonia asiatica, Albizia, and Hernandia moerenhoutiana.

== Conservation ==
As the mewing kingfisher is endemic to a single island, it was previously viewed as a vulnerable species. In 2008, the IUCN expressed concerns over human-related habitat loss and disturbance from introduced species such as the common myna In the early 2000s, the Taporoporo'anga Ipukarea Society proposed a program to eradicate the common myna from Mangaia.

However, further study determined that despite its restricted range, the population of the mewing kingfisher remains stable. Thacker et al suggested in 2020 that previous studies might have undercounted the mewing kingfisher and that the common myna does not pose a significant threat to the kingfisher's numbers. They further suggested that the IUCN should not list the species as vulnerable.

As of 2021, the mewing kingfisher is listed as a species of least concern.
