= Micronesian kingfisher =

Micronesian kingfisher is a common name used to refer to several species of bird of the genus Todiramphus found in neighboring island countries of the western Pacific Ocean.

- Guam kingfisher, Todiramphus cinnamominus
- Pohnpei kingfisher, Todiramphus reichenbachii
- Rusty-capped kingfisher, Todiramphus pelewensis
