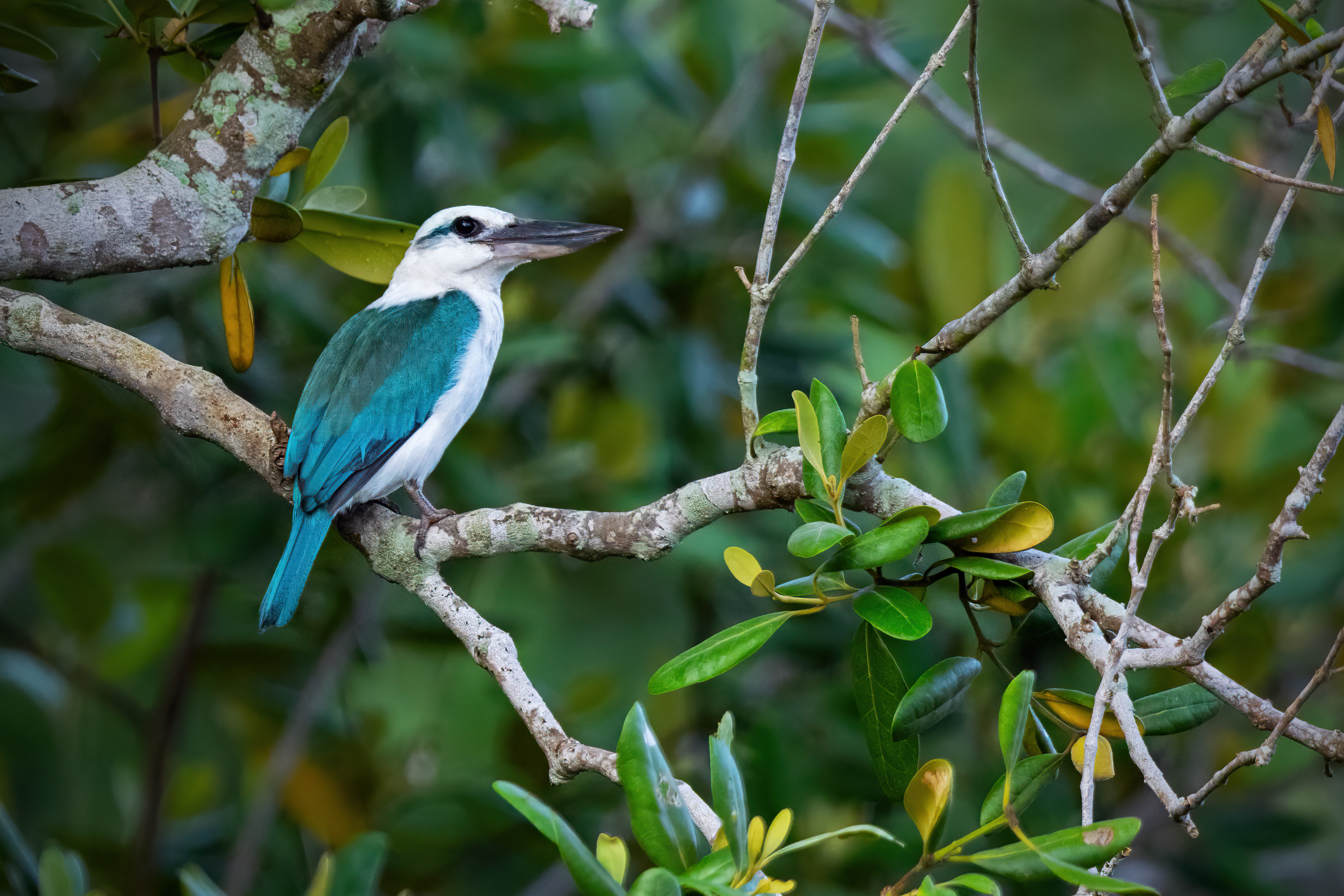

Conservation status
- Least Concern (IUCN 3.1)

Scientific classification
- Kingdom: Animalia
- Phylum: Chordata
- Class: Aves
- Order: Coraciiformes
- Family: Alcedinidae
- Subfamily: Halcyoninae
- Genus: Todiramphus
- Species: T. saurophagus

Binomial name
- Todiramphus saurophagus (Gould, 1843)

Subspecies
- T. s. saurophagus - (Gould, 1843); T. s. admiralitatis - (Sharpe, 1892)

Synonyms
- Todiramphus saurophaga

= Beach kingfisher =

Species of bird

The beach kingfisher (Todiramphus saurophagus) is a species of bird in the kingfisher family Alcedinidae. It is closely related to members of the collared kingfisher species complex, specifically the Melanesian kingfisher, but it is twice the size of members of that complex found close to it. The beach kingfisher has two subspecies, the widespread nominate race and T. s. admiralitatis of the Admiralty Islands.

The beach kingfisher is found from North Moluccan Islands in Indonesia, along the northern and southwestern coasts and islands of New Guinea, around New Britain and New Ireland and Solomon Islands from Bougainville to Makira. Within its range it is found on beaches, cliffs and headlands, as well as mangrove forests, more rarely inland in coconut plantations and gardens. During the dry season some birds are partially migratory, moving from offshore islands to the mainland of New Guinea.

The beach kingfisher is a large kingfisher, 30 cm (12 in) in length and weighing between 90–146 g (3.2–5.1 oz) (with the smallest males being smaller than the smallest females). The plumage of the sexes are the same, with the head, neck and underparts are all white, except for a small black line behind the eye, and the back, wings and uppertail are gree-blue. The subspecies T. s. admiralitatis is the same as the nominate, except it has variable amounts of green-blue feathers in the crown.

The beach kingfisher takes a variety of prey, with the tides influencing its foraging habits. During low tide it will forage for crabs from beaches, but when the tide is high it takes lizards and insects from under trees just off the coast. Beach kingfishers typically hunt from an exposed perch, swooping down when prey is found, but can also hover and dive for fish up to 100 m (330 ft) from shore. Beach kingfishers nest in holes in tree trunks of branches, 3–5 m (9.8–16.4 ft) off the ground. They apparently have a nesting season of between August and December in New Guinea, and pairs lay between two to four eggs.
