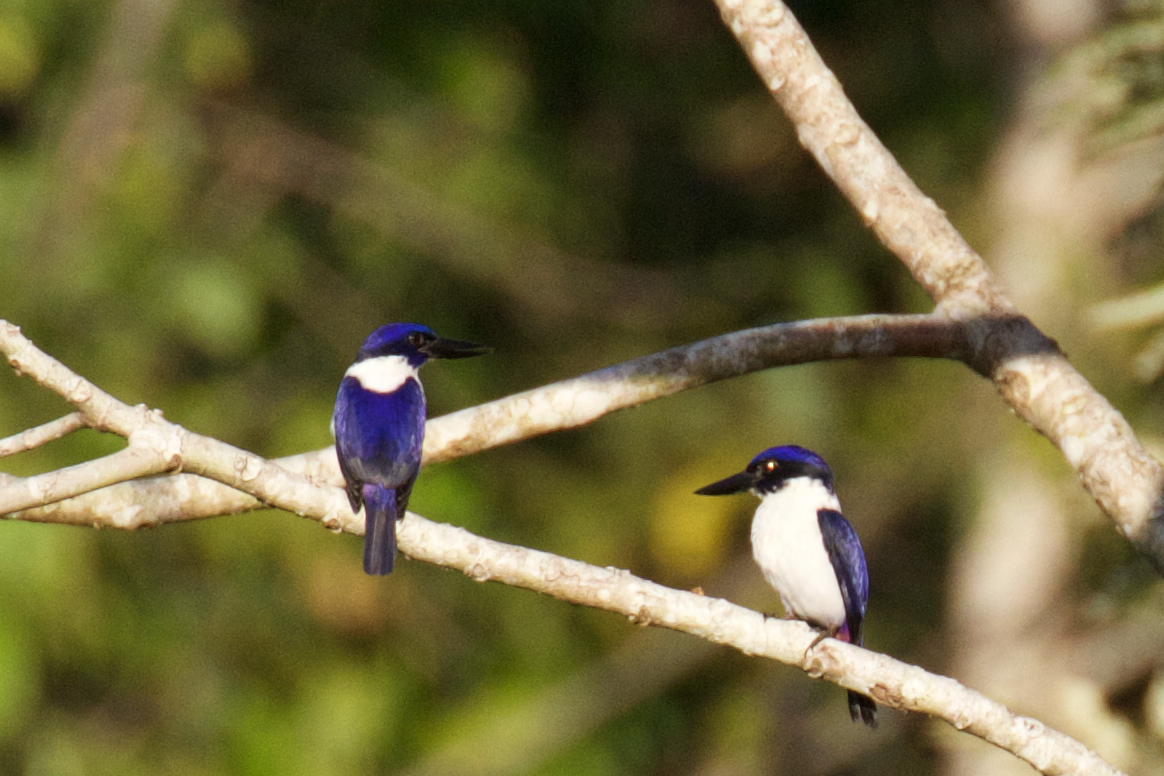

Conservation status
- Least Concern (IUCN 3.1)

Scientific classification
- Kingdom: Animalia
- Phylum: Chordata
- Class: Aves
- Order: Coraciiformes
- Family: Alcedinidae
- Subfamily: Halcyoninae
- Genus: Todiramphus
- Species: T. leucopygius

Binomial name
- Todiramphus leucopygius (Verreaux, 1858)

= Ultramarine kingfisher =

Species of bird

The ultramarine kingfisher (Todiramphus leucopygius) is a species of bird in the family Alcedinidae.

== Habitat ==
It is native to the Solomon Islands archipelago. Its natural habitat is subtropical or tropical moist lowland forests.
