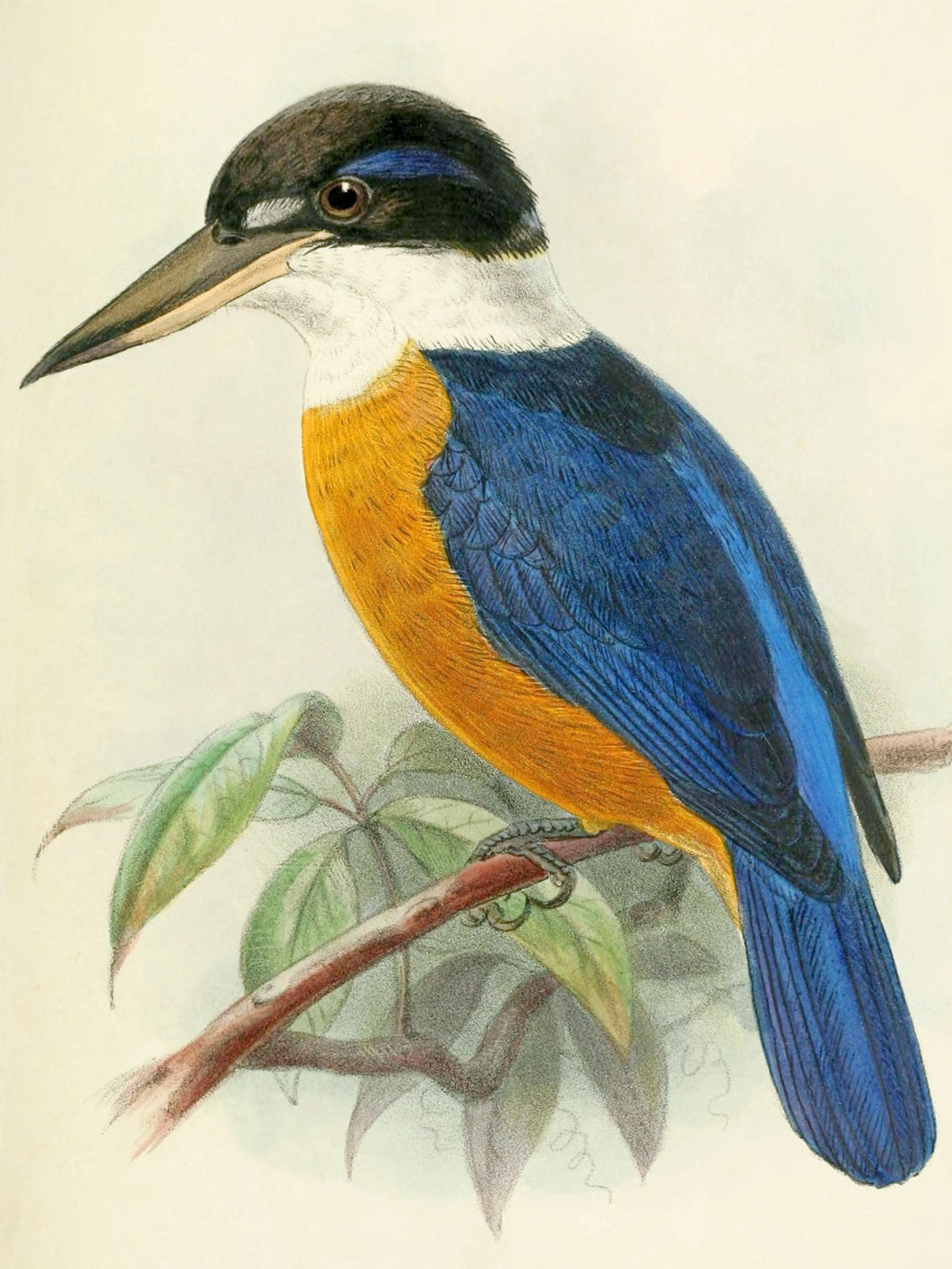

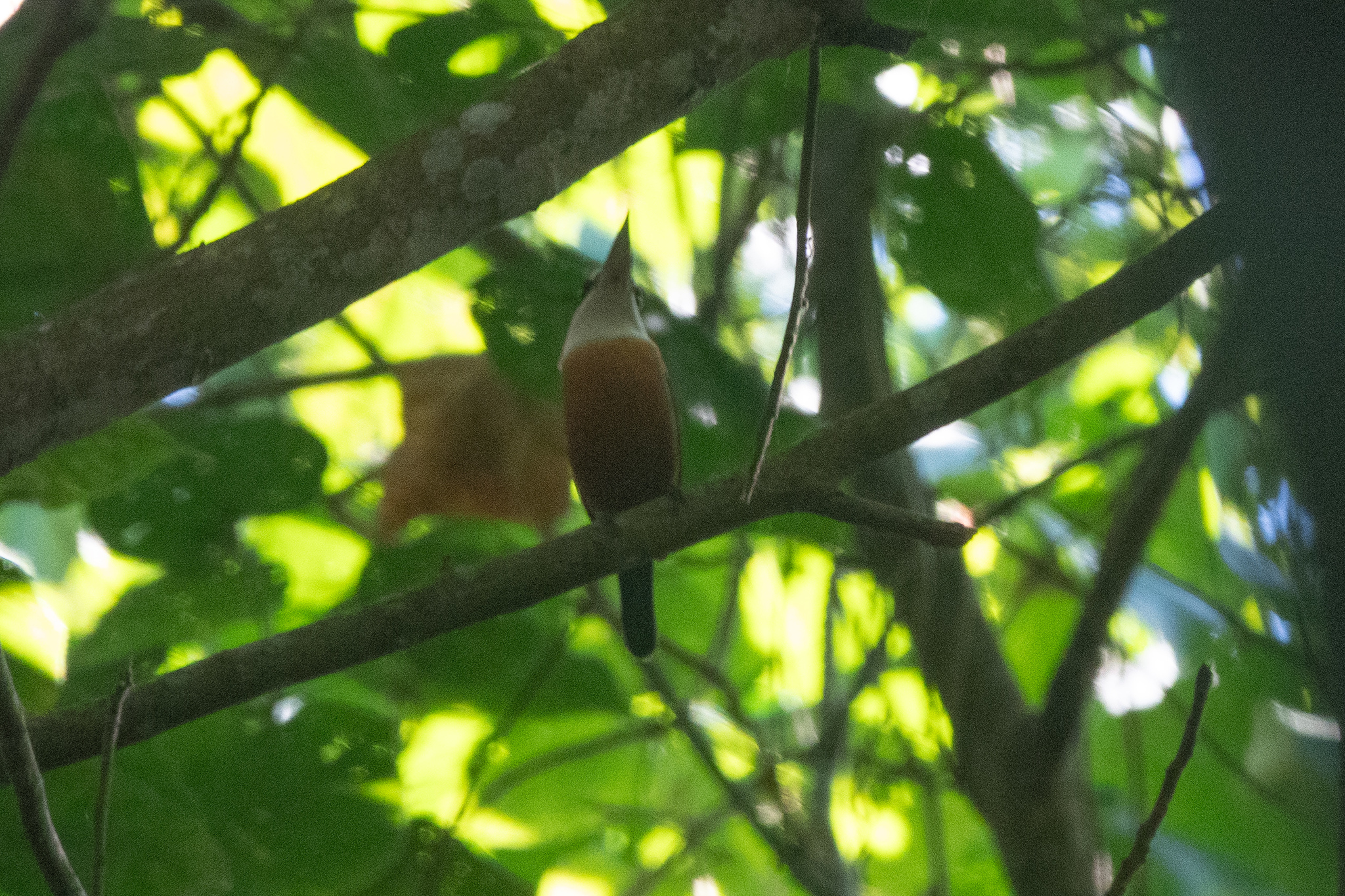

Conservation status
- Near Threatened (IUCN 3.1)

Scientific classification
- Kingdom: Animalia
- Phylum: Chordata
- Class: Aves
- Order: Coraciiformes
- Family: Alcedinidae
- Subfamily: Halcyoninae
- Genus: Todiramphus
- Species: T. farquhari

Binomial name
- Todiramphus farquhari (Sharpe, 1899)

= Vanuatu kingfisher =

Species of bird

The Vanuatu kingfisher or chestnut-bellied kingfisher (Todiramphus farquhari) is a medium-sized kingfisher found only on the islands of Espiritu Santo, Malo and Malakula in Vanuatu.

It is dark blue above with richly coloured orange underparts. There is a white spot in front of the eye and a broad black band on the side of the head. It has a white throat and collar. It measures 19–21 cm (7.5–8.3 in) in length and weighs 32–42 grams (1.1–1.5 oz). Its call is a series of loud, shrill, piping notes. The only other kingfisher in Vanuatu is the Pacific kingfisher, which has paler blue-green upperparts, whiter underparts and a buff stripe above the eye.

The Vanuatu kingfisher mainly eats insects, especially beetles, and will also take spiders and small lizards. It usually hunts by perching on a branch and waiting for prey to appear. When it spots something it flies into the air or dives down to the ground or a tree trunk to catch it.

The nest is sometimes built in a hole in a palm tree or tree fern, but usually a pair will excavate a burrow in a termite mound in a tree. They dig with their large bill and clear out material with their feet. After about fifteen days the burrow is completed and the termites seal off their sections. Three or four white eggs are laid. The breeding season is mostly from November to February with eggs laid in December.

The birds mainly inhabit dense rainforests in the interior of the islands, particularly above 200 m (660 ft). They are believed to be declining due to loss and degradation of the forest.
