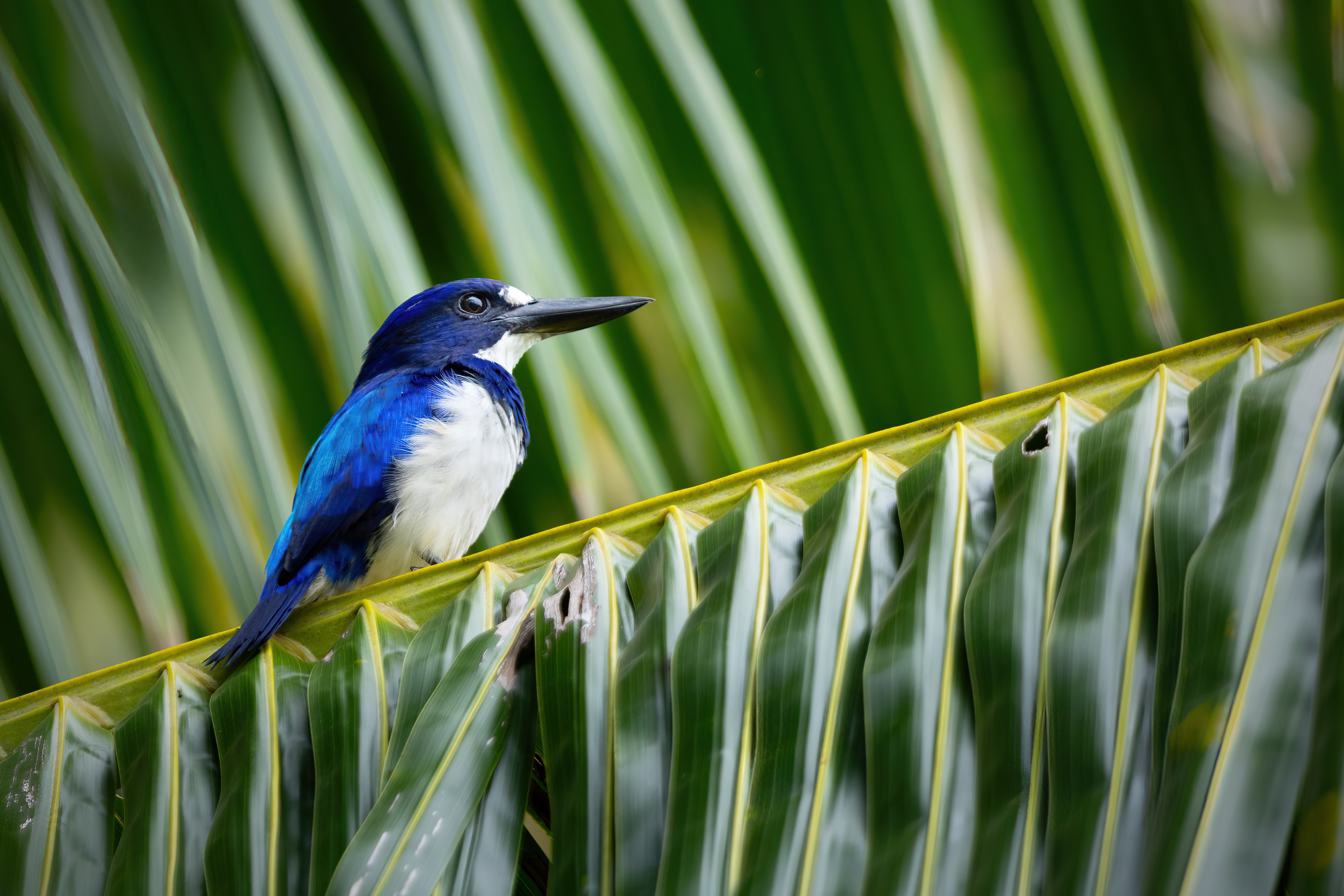

Conservation status
- Least Concern (IUCN 3.1)

Scientific classification
- Kingdom: Animalia
- Phylum: Chordata
- Class: Aves
- Order: Coraciiformes
- Family: Alcedinidae
- Subfamily: Halcyoninae
- Genus: Todiramphus
- Species: T. diops

Binomial name
- Todiramphus diops (Temminck, 1824)

= Blue-and-white kingfisher =

Species of bird

Blue-and-white Kingfisher, male with prey (lizard)

The blue-and-white kingfisher (Todiramphus diops) is a species of bird in the family Alcedinidae. It is endemic to North Maluku in Indonesia. It can be found on the islands of Morotai, Ngelengele, Halmahera, Damar, Ternate, Tidore, Moti, Bacan, Obi and Obilatu.

Its natural habitat is subtropical or tropical mangrove forests.
