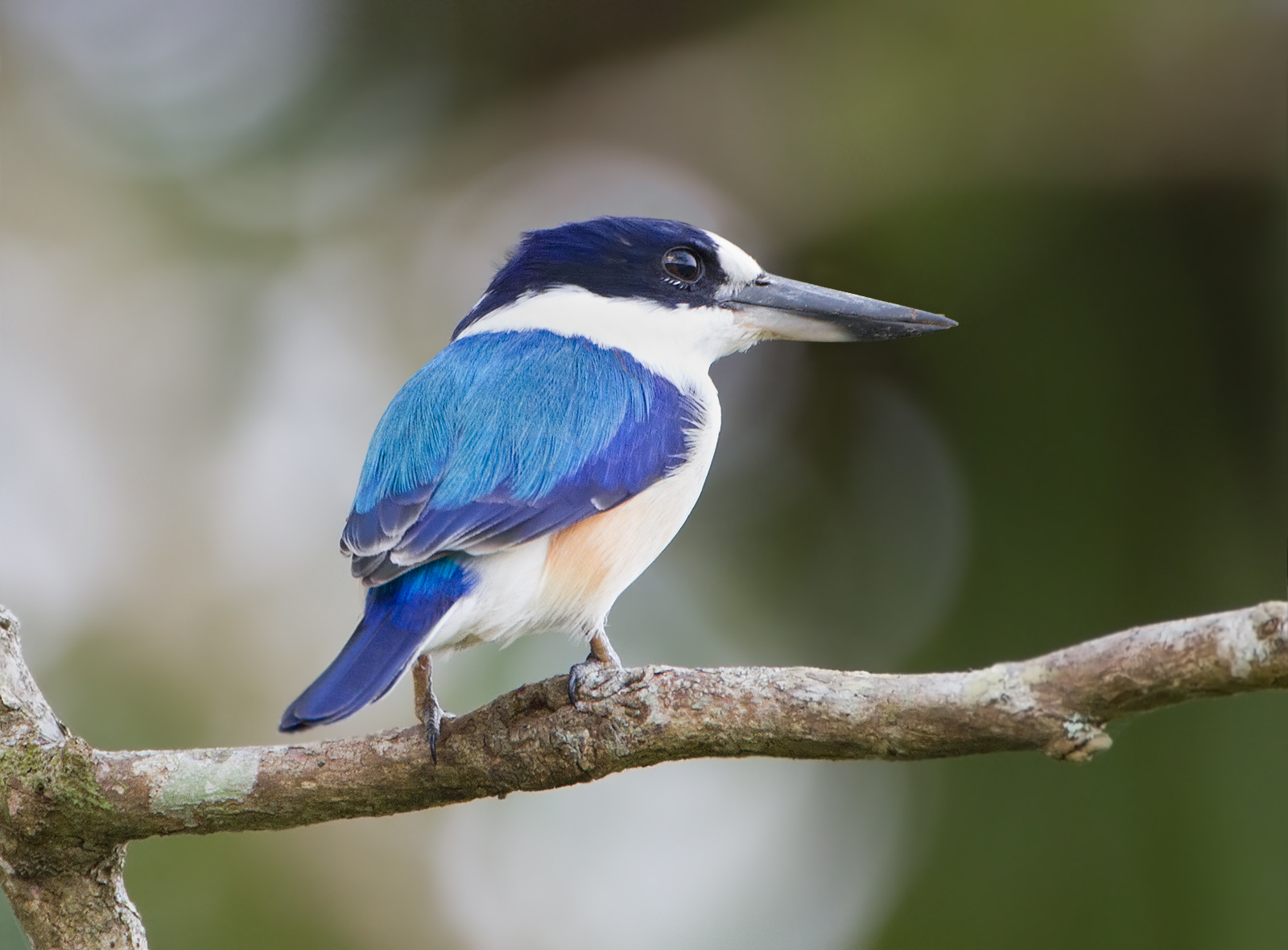
- Daintree Village, Queensland, Australia

Conservation status
- Least Concern (IUCN 3.1)

Scientific classification
- Kingdom: Animalia
- Phylum: Chordata
- Class: Aves
- Order: Coraciiformes
- Family: Alcedinidae
- Subfamily: Halcyoninae
- Genus: Todiramphus
- Species: T. macleayii

Binomial name
- Todiramphus macleayii (Jardine & Selby, 1830)

Subspecies
- T. m. elisabeth – (Heine, 1883); T. m. macleayii – (Jardine & Selby, 1830); T. m. incinctus – (Gould, 1838)

Synonyms
- Halcyon macleayii

= Forest kingfisher =

Species of bird

The forest kingfisher (Todiramphus macleayii), also known as Macleay's or the blue kingfisher, is a species of kingfisher in the subfamily Halcyoninae, also known as tree kingfishers. It is a predominantly a blue and white bird. It is found in Indonesia, New Guinea and coastal eastern and Northern Australia. Like many other kingfishers, it hunts invertebrates, small frogs, and lizards.

== Taxonomy ==
The forest kingfisher was first described by the naturalists Sir William Jardine and Prideaux John Selby in 1830. It was known for many years by its old scientific name of Halcyon macleayi before being transferred to the genus Todiramphus. The generic name is derived from the genus Todus (Brisson, 1760), 'tody' (a West Indian insectivorous bird) and Ancient Greek rhamphos, 'bill'. The specific epithet honours the Scottish entomologist and Colonial Secretary to New South Wales Alexander Macleay (1767–1848).

Three subspecies are recognised:

- T. m. macleayi, the nominate subspecies, is found across the Top End eastwards to the Gulf of Carpentaria.
- T. m. incinctus, described by John Gould, has a greener tinge to its back and is slightly larger. It is found down the east coast of Australia.
- T. m. elisabeth (Heine, 1883) is found in eastern New Guinea.

== Description ==
The forest kingfisher measures 21.5–25.5 cm (8.5–10.0 in) in length and the male weighs 32–43 g (1.1–1.5 oz) while the female weighs 29–44 g (1.0–1.6 oz). It has blue wings, head and tail with white breast, abdomen and nape. It has a white patch in front of the eyes and a black band stretching from the bill, through the eyes to the ear coverts. A white patch is visible on the wings in flight. The female is distinguished by a blue rather than white nape. The iris is dark brown and the legs and feet dark grey. Immature birds are duller with a blackish crown. The call is a shrill t-reek, repeated regularly, most often in the early morning.

== Distribution and habitat ==
The forest kingfisher is native to Indonesia, Papua New Guinea, the Solomon Islands, and Australia, where it is found on or near the Australian coastline from Port Stephens in New South Wales northwards to Cape York and westwards across the Top End. It is a summer visitor in the southern parts of its range in New South Wales and southern Queensland; elsewhere it is resident all year round.

As its name suggests, it inhabits subtropical or tropical dry forest, subtropical or tropical moist lowland forest, and subtropical or tropical mangrove forest and Melaleuca swampland.

== Behaviour ==
=== Feeding ===
The forest kingfisher hunts invertebrates, such as bugs, beetles, grasshoppers, spiders, dragonflies, cicadas, ants, adult and larval butterflies, and worms, as well as small fish, frogs and tadpoles, lizards, and snakes. The forest kingfisher watches from a high perch, dives to the ground or water to seize its prey (sally-pouncing), then returns directly to the perch. It often kills prey by hitting it against a branch after seizing it.

=== Breeding ===
Breeding season is August to February in Australia with often two broods raised. The nest is a short burrow into a round chamber within an arboreal termite nest, around 4–12 m (13–39 ft) above the ground. Three to six (usually 4 or 5) white shiny eggs are laid, measuring 25 mm × 22 mm (0.98 in × 0.87 in). Both parents (and possibly any helpers present) incubate the eggs for 18 to 21 days. The fledging period is 27 to 31 days and fledglings are fed for around a month before they leave the nest.

== Conservation status ==
Although the population trend of the forest kingfisher is decreasing, it is classed as a species of least concern on the IUCN Red List.

== Gallery ==
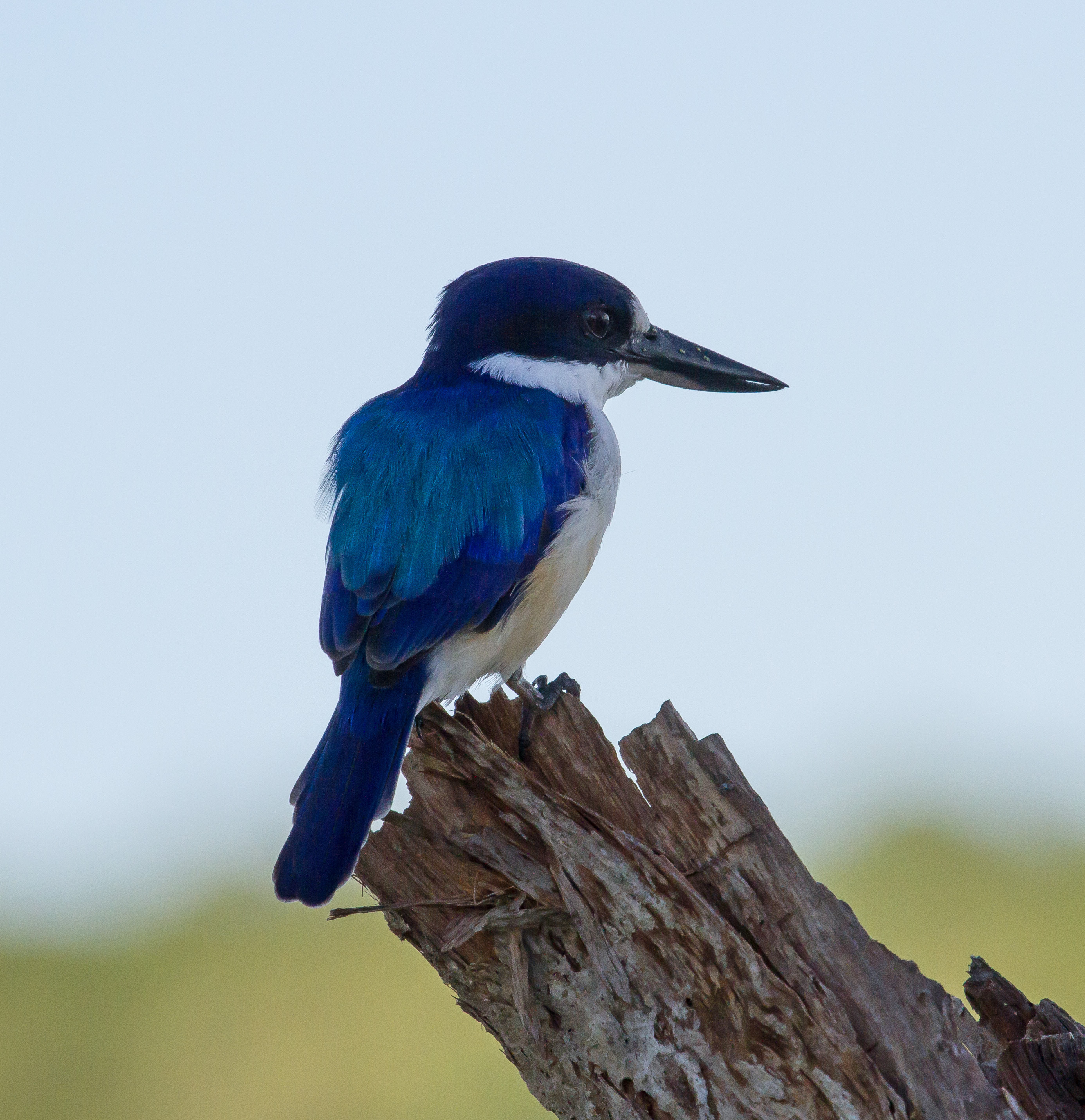
Forest kingfisher – Fogg Dam, Middle Point – Northern Territory, Australia – March 2014

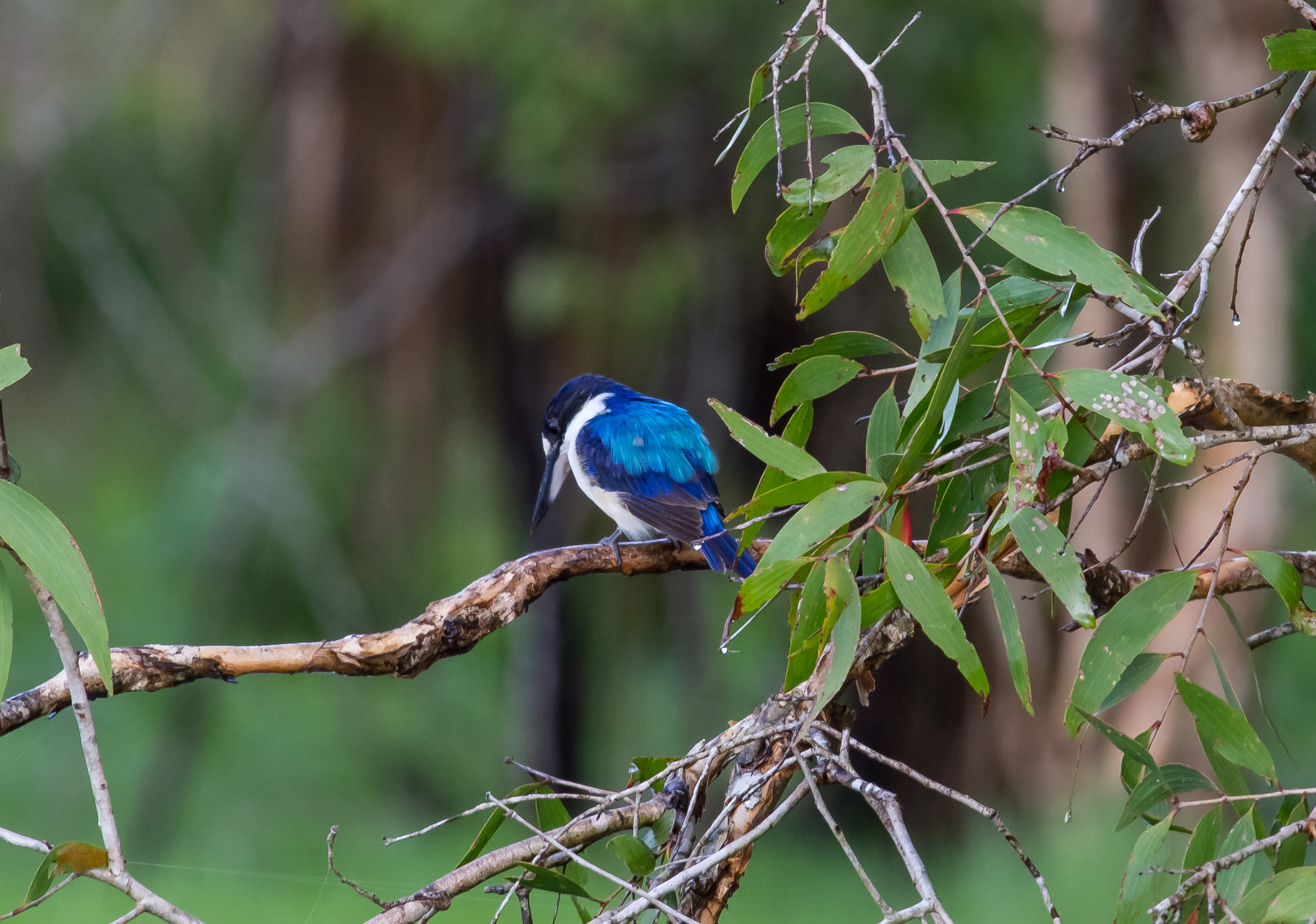
Forest kingfisher about to dive for food – Fogg Dam – Middle Point – Northern Territory – Australia

Kobble Creek, SE Queensland, Australia
