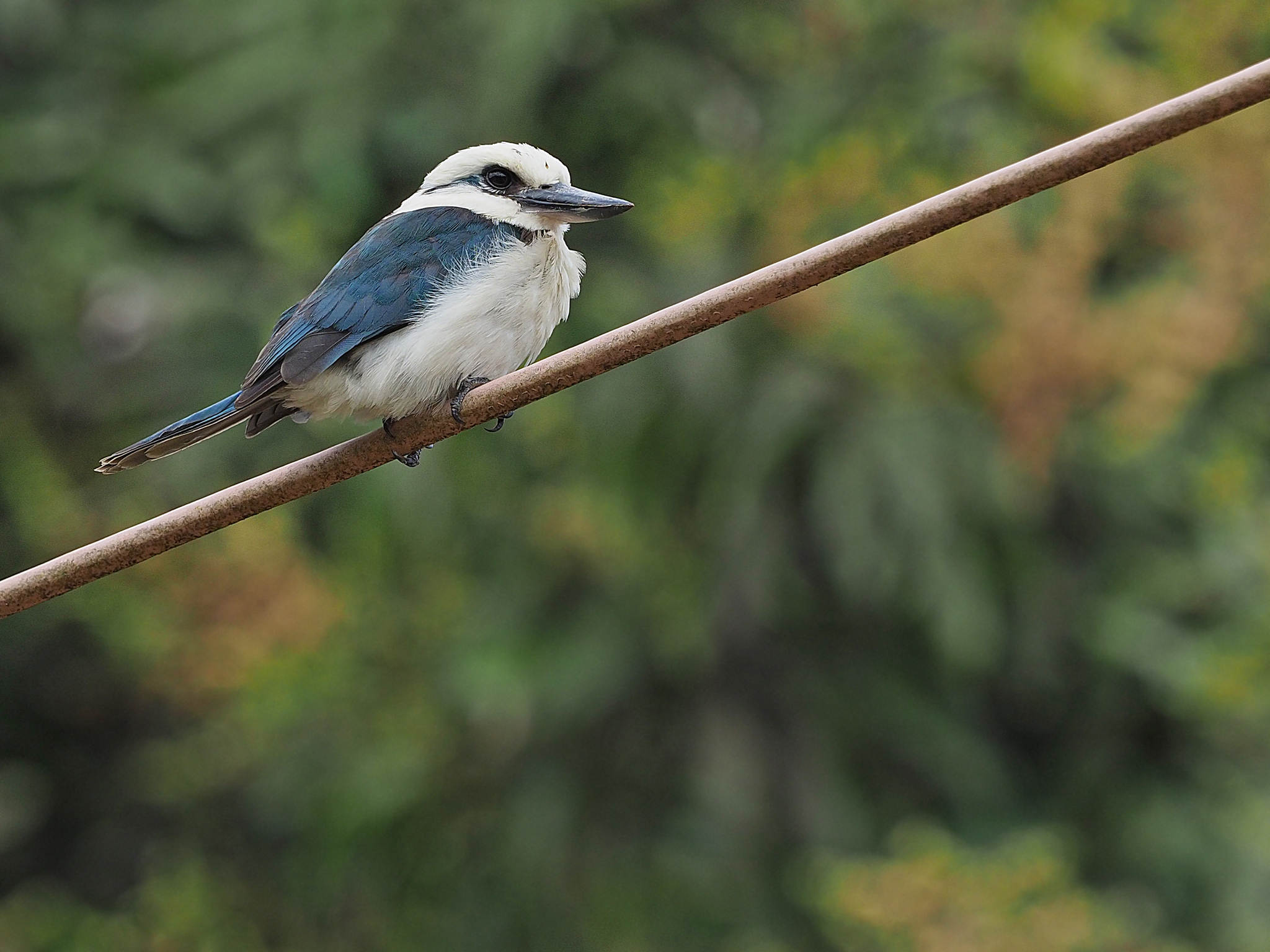

Conservation status
- Near Threatened (IUCN 3.1)

Scientific classification
- Kingdom: Animalia
- Phylum: Chordata
- Class: Aves
- Order: Coraciiformes
- Family: Alcedinidae
- Subfamily: Halcyoninae
- Genus: Todiramphus
- Species: T. tutus

Binomial name
- Todiramphus tutus (Gmelin, JF, 1788)

= Chattering kingfisher =

Species of bird

The chattering kingfisher (Todiramphus tutus) is a species of bird in the kingfisher family Alcedinidae. The species is found in the Cook Islands and the Society Islands in French Polynesia.

== Taxonomy ==
The chattering kingfisher was formally described in 1788 by the German naturalist Johann Friedrich Gmelin in his revised and expanded edition of Carl Linnaeus's Systema Naturae. He placed it with other kingfishers in the genus Alcedo and coined the binomial name Alcedo tuta. Gmelin based his description on the "respected kingfisher" that had been described in 1782 by the English ornithologist John Latham in his multi-volume A General Synopsis of Birds. Latham gave the locality as Otaheite (Tahiti) but did not specify how he had access to a specimen. Latham noted that the Polynesians revered and protected kingfishers. The specimen (or specimens) would have been collected during either James Cook's second or third voyages to the Pacific Ocean. The society kingfisher (T. veneratus) is present on Tahiti but it is doubtful whether the chattering kingfisher ever occurred on the island in historical times. The chattering kingfisher is now one of 30 species placed in the genus Todiramphus that was introduced in 1827 by René Lesson. The word Todiramphus combines the genus name Todus with the Ancient Greek rhamphos meaning "bill". The specific epithet tutus is Latin meaning "revered".

A molecular phylogenetic study published in 2015 found that the chattering kingfisher was closely related to two other species that are endemic to islands in eastern Polynesia: the Niau kingfisher (T. gertrudae) and the society kingfisher (T. veneratus).

Three subspecies are recognised:

- T. t. tutus (Gmelin, JF, 1788) – central Society Islands (east Polynesia)
- T. t. atiu (Holyoak, 1974) – Atiu (east Cook Islands)
- T. t. mauke (Holyoak, 1974) – Mauke (east Cook Islands)

== Description ==
It resembles the collared kingfisher but is smaller and lacks any rust colour in the plumage. The breast and throat is white, and the back, wings and crown are blue-green (although the crown of the Atiu subspecies is almost entirely white). It can be told from the Tahiti kingfisher by the complete white collar.

== Habitat ==
Its natural habitats are tropical moist lowland forests and tropical moist montane forest. The species prefers primary forest in montane valleys, but will move into secondary growth and old plantations. The species has an uneven distribution. Nevertheless, it is not considered threatened with extinction by the IUCN.

== Behaviour ==
The chattering kingfisher lives singly or in pairs and feeds on insects and lizards taken on the wing or from the ground. The species nests in tree cavities.
