= Te Ipukarea Society =

Environmental NGO in the Cook Islands

Te Ipukarea Society (TIS) is an environmental non-government organisation based in the Cook Islands of Polynesia in the south-western Pacific Ocean. The original name was Taporoporo'anga Ipukarea Society, but it was shortened to make it easier to pronounce. An approximate translation of the name from Cook Islands Māori is "looking after our heritage". It is the BirdLife International partner organisation for the Cook Islands, and also a member of the International Union for Conservation of Nature.

== History ==
Following a restructure of the government-funded Environmental Service, TIS was set up in 1996 both as an environmental watchdog, and to promote harmony between Cook Islanders and their environment through the raising of awareness, initiation of projects, and liaison with the government and other NGOs. Activities that TIS has been involved in include:

- A recovery program for the endangered Rarotonga monarch (Pomarea dimidiata), a bird endemic to the Cook Islands which had declined to a population low of about 38 individuals in 1987
- The successful "Save Our Suwarrow" campaign, which opposed a proposal to farm black-lip oysters (Pinctada margaritifera) for pearls in the pristine lagoon of Suwarrow, an uninhabited atoll important for breeding seabirds which had been declared a national park in 1978

In 2018, a team from Te Ipukarea Society completed a rat eradication of the whole of Suwarrow, with the baiting of Motu Tou, and the two smaller motus Kena 1 and 2. However, a monitoring mission is still needed to verify there are no more rats, and that they have not been reintroduced by, for example, visiting inter island boats, foreign fishing boats, or yachts.

- A project proposal to eradicate an invasive bird, the common myna (Acridotheres tristis), from the island of Mangaia, where it is posing a threat to the endemic Mangaia kingfisher (Todiramphus ruficollaris)
