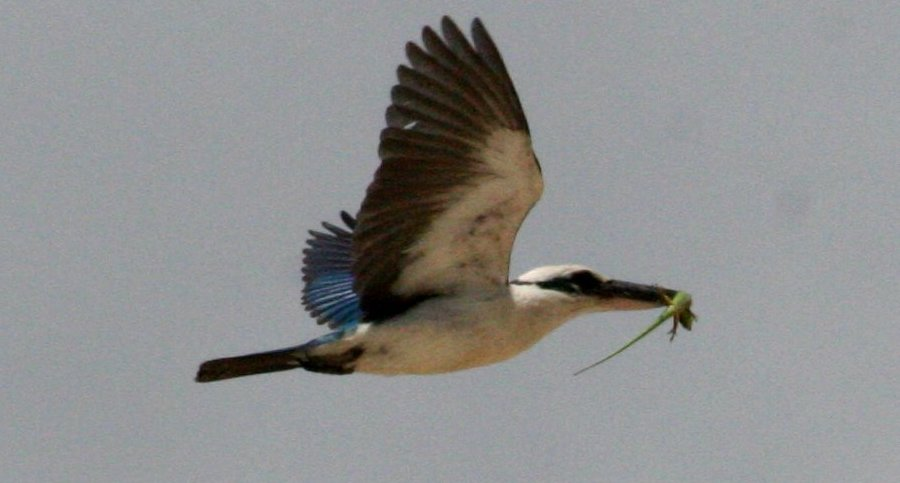

Scientific classification
- Domain: Eukaryota
- Kingdom: Animalia
- Phylum: Chordata
- Class: Aves
- Order: Coraciiformes
- Family: Alcedinidae
- Subfamily: Halcyoninae
- Genus: Todiramphus
- Species: T. albicilla

Binomial name
- Todiramphus albicilla (Dumont, 1823)

= Mariana kingfisher =

Species of bird

The Mariana kingfisher (Todiramphus albicilla) is a species of bird in the family Alcedinidae. It is endemic to the Northern Mariana Islands. Its natural habitats are subtropical or tropical moist lowland forests and plantations. It was formerly considered a subspecies of the collared kingfisher.

== Subspecies ==
- T. a. owstoni (Rothschild, 1904) – northern Mariana Islands
- T. a. albicilla (Dumont, 1823) – southern Mariana Islands
- T. a. orii (Taka-Tsukasa & Momiyama, 1931) – Rota

== See also ==
- List of birds of the Northern Mariana Islands
