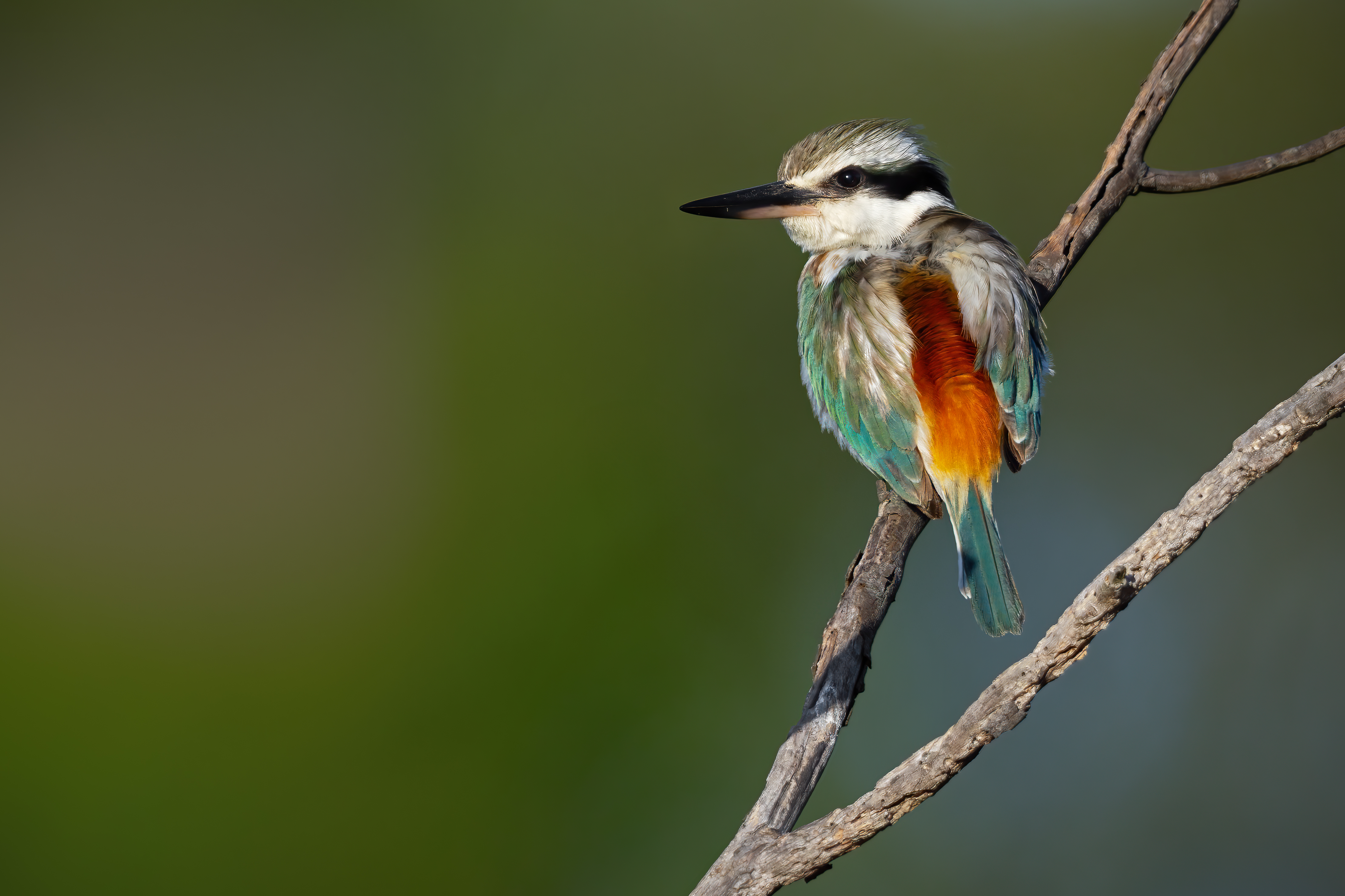

Conservation status
- Least Concern (IUCN 3.1)

Scientific classification
- Kingdom: Animalia
- Phylum: Chordata
- Class: Aves
- Order: Coraciiformes
- Family: Alcedinidae
- Subfamily: Halcyoninae
- Genus: Todiramphus
- Species: T. pyrrhopygius

Binomial name
- Todiramphus pyrrhopygius (Gould, 1841)

Synonyms
- Halcyon pyrrhopygia

= Red-backed kingfisher =

Species of bird

The red-backed kingfisher (Todiramphus pyrrhopygius) is a species of kingfisher in the subfamily Halcyoninae, also known as tree kingfishers. It is a predominantly blue-green and white bird with a chestnut rump. It is found across the continent of Australia, mainly inhabiting the drier regions.

== Taxonomy ==
The red-backed kingfisher was first described by the English ornithologist and bird artist John Gould in 1841. He coined the binomial name Halcyon pyrrhopygia. It was known for many years by this scientific name before being transferred to the genus Todiramphus. The generic name is derived from the genus Todus (Brisson, 1760), 'tody' (a West Indian insectivorous bird) and Ancient Greek rhamphos, 'bill'. Its specific epithet is derived from the Ancient Greek words pyrrho-/πυρρο- 'flame-coloured' or 'red' and pyge/πυγή 'rump'. The species is monotypic.

== Description ==
The red-backed kingfisher measures 20 to 24 cm (7.9 to 9.4 in); the male weighs 45–70 g (1.6–2.5 oz) and the female 41–62 g (1.4–2.2 oz). It has a streaked green and white crown, bluish-green wings and tail, and lower back, rump and upper tail coverts chestnut with white breast, abdomen, and nape. It has a black band stretching from the bill, through the eyes and to the ear coverts. The female is duller overall in coloration, with the crown more heavily streaked, dull turquoise in wings, and more buff in areas of white. The iris is dark brown and the legs and feet dark grey. Immature birds are like female, but with dull green back and mantle and speckling on their breasts.

=== Voice ===
The call is a descending, mournful whistle "kee-ip", repeated every few seconds in a long series from a tree-top or telephone wire. The red-backed kingfisher is noisy when mating with a harsh alarm calls and parrot-like chatter given by birds near the nest.

== Distribution and habitat ==
The red-backed kingfisher is native to most of Australia, except Tasmania and the extreme southwest and southeast of the mainland. It is a summer visitor to the southeast of the country; elsewhere it is resident all year round. It inhabits dry forests, mulga and mallee country, to spinifex and almost treeless country, often far from water. During breeding season, the red-backed kingfisher will move to river courses to make use of the earthy banks to dig nesting burrows. It appears to be partly migratory to the south of the continent for the breeding season, returning north in winter. It is moderately common to uncommon, due to its irregular nomadic movements, probably depending on the occurrence of erratic rainfall.

== Behaviour ==
=== Breeding ===
The breeding season is August to February, often with a double brood, although birds may not breed in times of drought. The nest is a burrow 0.5–1.25 m (18–50 in) into the top third section of a steep sloping bank overlooking a dry creek-bed or dam, or occasionally in an abandoned mine-shaft or hollow branch. They may vacate the site if the riverbed becomes inundated. Occasionally, nests may be situated in termite mounds in the north of the country. Two to six white, rounded, shiny eggs are laid, measuring 25 mm × 22 mm (0.98 in × 0.87 in). The eggs are incubated by both adults for 20–23 days, and after a further 26–30 days, fledglings are able to leave the nest. Threats to the nest are flooding by sudden downpours, and being dug up and eaten by goannas, dingoes and foxes.

=== Feeding ===
The red-backed kingfisher observes from a conspicuous perch in a tree or on overhead wires, then swoops to the ground to take its prey and return directly to its perch . Its diet consists of various insects (including locusts and grasshoppers, beetles, leaf-insects, ants and caterpillars), spiders, small crustaceans, centipedes, and scorpions. It also takes vertebrates, such as fish, frogs and tadpoles, lizards, snakes, and occasionally mouse-sized mammals.

== Conservation status ==
The population trend of the red-backed kingfisher is increasing, and given its very extensive distribution, the species is classed as least concern on the IUCN Red List.

Dayboro, SE Qld, Australia, April 2008
