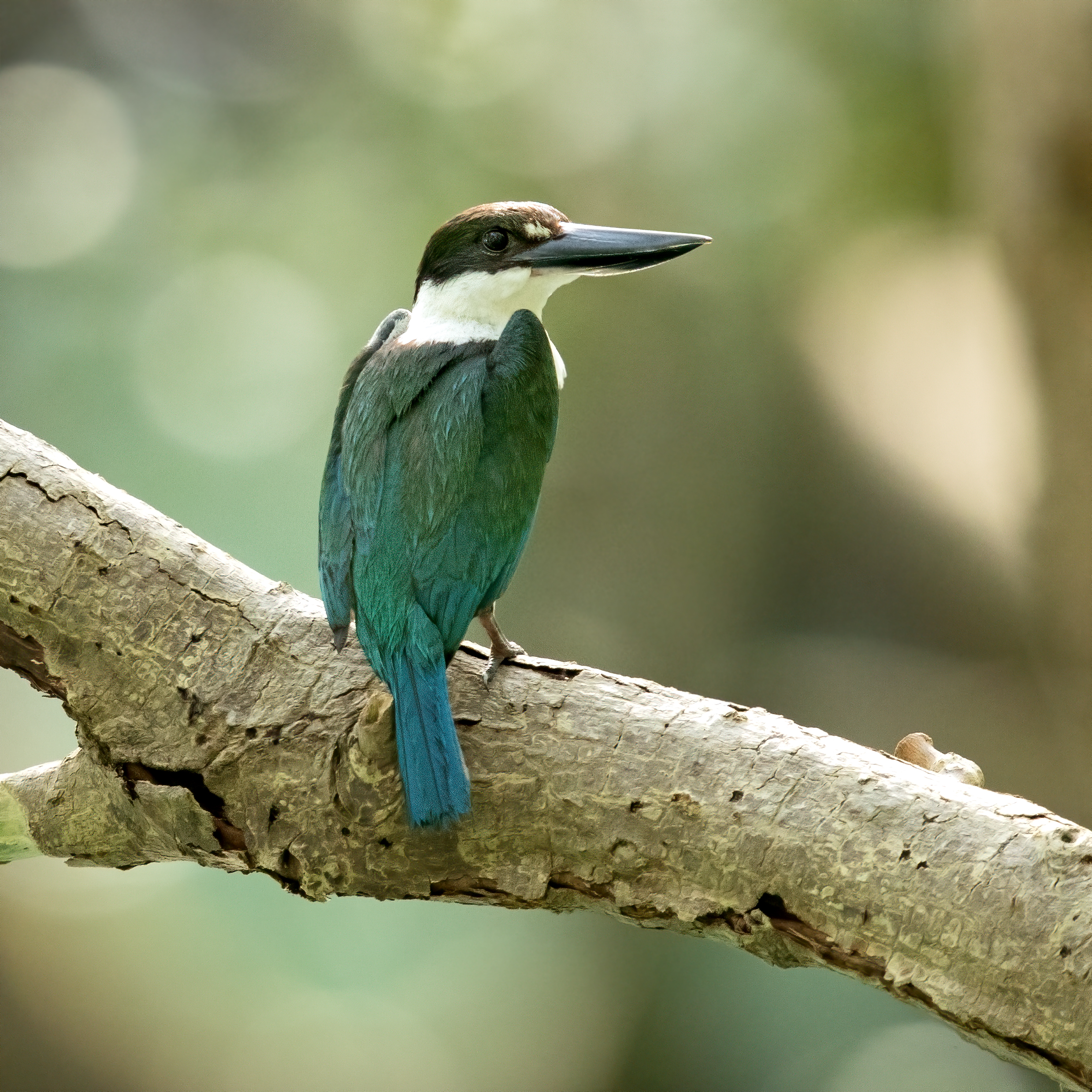

Scientific classification
- Kingdom: Animalia
- Phylum: Chordata
- Class: Aves
- Order: Coraciiformes
- Family: Alcedinidae
- Subfamily: Halcyoninae
- Genus: Todiramphus
- Species: T. sordidus

Binomial name
- Todiramphus sordidus (Gould, 1842)

= Torresian kingfisher =

Species of bird

The Torresian kingfisher (Todiramphus sordidus) is a species of bird in the family Alcedinidae. It is found in southern New Guinea and in Australia. Its natural habitats are subtropical or tropical moist lowland forests, mangroves, and plantations. It was formerly considered a subspecies of the collared kingfisher.

== Taxonomy ==
Three subspecies are recognised:

- T. s. sordidus (Gould, 1842) – Aru Islands, southern coasts of New Guinea, and northern and north-eastern coasts of Australia
- T. s. pilbara (Johnstone, 1983) – coastal north-western Australia from the De Grey River to Exmouth Gulf
- T. s. colcloughi (Mathews, 1916) – coastal east central to southeastern Queensland
