= Islet kingfisher =

Scientific classification
- Kingdom: Animalia
- Phylum: Chordata
- Class: Aves
- Order: Coraciiformes
- Family: Alcedinidae
- Subfamily: Halcyoninae
- Genus: Todiramphus
- Species: T. colonus

Binomial name
- Todiramphus colonus (Hartert, 1896)

Species of bird

The islet kingfisher (Todiramphus colonus) is a species of bird in the family Alcedinidae.

== Distribution ==
It is endemic to islands in the Louisiade Archipelago, within Papua New Guinea.

Its natural habitats are subtropical or tropical moist lowland forests and plantations.

== Taxonomy ==
It was formerly considered a subspecies of the collared kingfisher.
