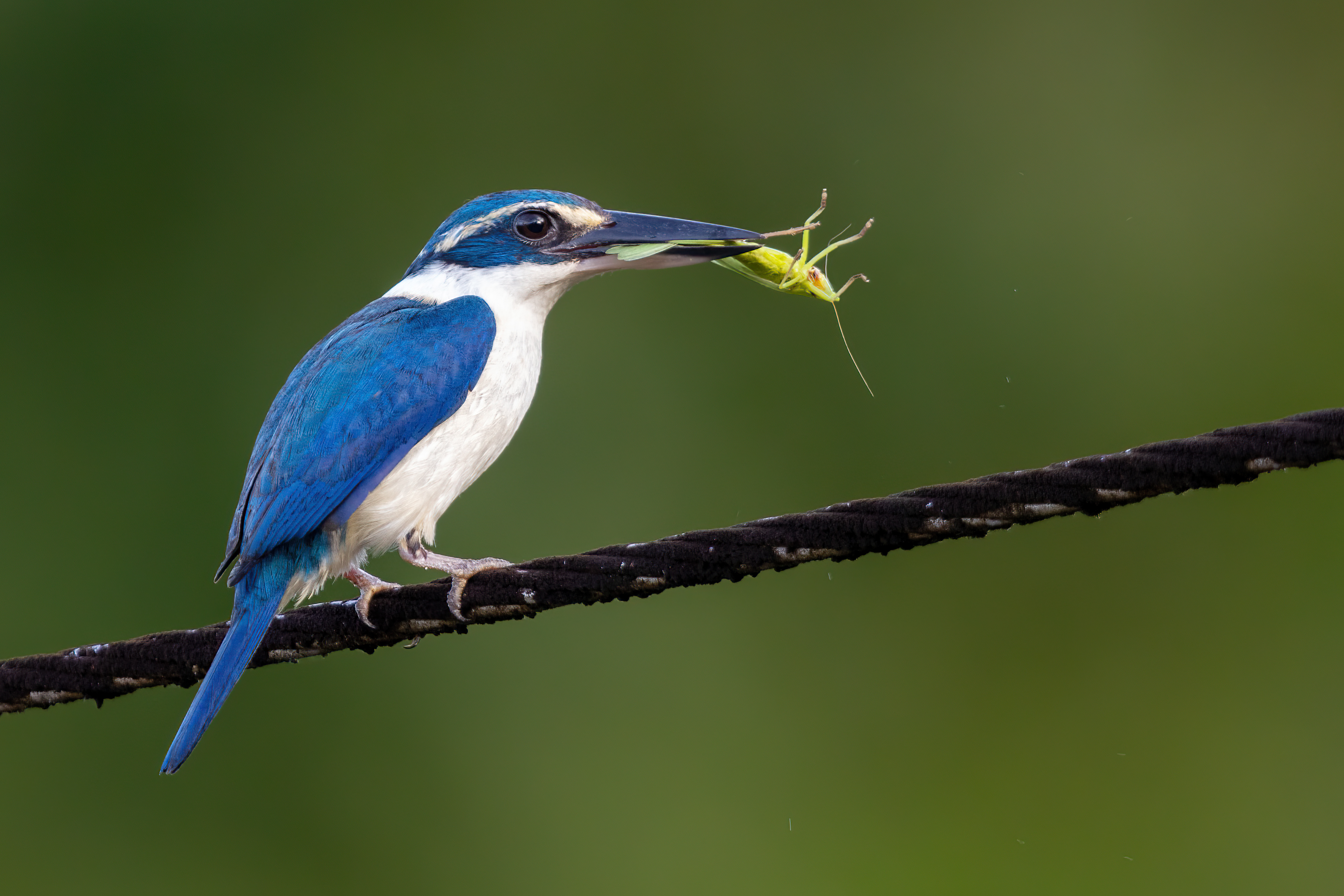

Scientific classification
- Kingdom: Animalia
- Phylum: Chordata
- Class: Aves
- Order: Coraciiformes
- Family: Alcedinidae
- Subfamily: Halcyoninae
- Genus: Todiramphus
- Species: T. sacer

Binomial name
- Todiramphus sacer (Gmelin, JF, 1788)

= Pacific kingfisher =

Species of bird

The Pacific kingfisher (Todiramphus sacer) is a medium-sized kingfisher belonging to the subfamily Halcyoninae, the tree kingfishers. It has a wide range throughout the South Pacific islands, including American Samoa, Fiji, Tonga, the Solomon Islands and Vanuatu. It was previously considered a subspecies of the collared kingfisher.

== Taxonomy ==
The Pacific kingfisher was formally described in 1788 by the German naturalist Johann Friedrich Gmelin in his revised and expanded edition of Carl Linnaeus's Systema Naturae. He placed it with the other kingfishers in the genus Alcedo and coined the binomial name Alcedo sacra. Gmelin based his description on the "sacred kingfisher" that had been described and illustrated in 1782 by the English ornithologist John Latham in his multi-volume A General Synopsis of Birds. Latham noted that the Polynesians revered and protected kingfishers. Latham had access to a specimen in the Leverian Museum in London that had been collected during James Cook's third voyage to the Pacific Ocean from 1776 to 1780. The type locality was designated as the island of Tongatabu by Alexander Wetmore in 1919. The Pacific kingfisher is now one of 30 species placed in the genus Todiramphus that was introduced in 1827 by René Lesson. The word Todiramphus combines the genus name Todus with the Ancient Greek rhamphos meaning "bill". The specific epithet sacer is Latin meaning "sacred".

The Pacific kingfisher was formerly considered as a subspecies of the collared kingfisher (Todiramphus chloris). A molecular phylogenetic study published in 2015 found that T. chloris was paraphyletic. In the changes to create monophyletic species, T. sacer was promoted to species status and many of the T. chloris subspecies were moved to T. sacer.

=== Subspecies ===
There are 22 recognised subspecies:

Vanuatu

- T. s. torresianus (Mayr, 1931) – Hiw and Lo
- T. s. santoensis (Mayr, 1931) – Banks Islands southwards to Espiritu Santo and Malo
- T. s. juliae (Heine, 1860) – Aoba and Maewo southwards to Efate
- T. s. erromangae (Mayr, 1938) – Erromango and Anatom
- T. s. tannensis (Sharpe, 1892) – Tanna

Solomon Islands

- T. s. pavuvu (Mayr, 1935) – Pavuvu
- T. s. mala (Mayr, 1935) – Malaita
- T. s. solomonis (Ramsay, EP, 1882) – Makira and adjacent islands
- T. s. sororum (Galbraith, ICJ & Galbraith, EH, 1962) – Malaupaina and Malaulalo
- T. s. amoenus (Mayr, 1931) – Rennell and Bellona
- T. s. ornatus (Mayr, 1931) – Nendo and Tinakula
- T. s. brachyurus (Mayr, 1931) – Reef Islands
- T. s. vicina (Mayr, 1931) – Duff Islands
- T. s. utupuae (Mayr, 1931) – Utupua
- T. s. melanodera (Mayr, 1931) – Vanikoro

Fiji

- T. s. vitiensis (Peale, 1849) – Vanua Levu, Taveuni, Viti Levu, Koro, Ovalau and Gau
- T. s. marinus (Mayr, 1941) – Lau Archipelago
- T. s. eximius (Mayr, 1941) – Kadavu

Polynesia

- T. s. regina (Mayr, 1941) – Futuna
- T. s. pealei (Finsch & Hartlaub, 1867) – Tutuila
- T. s. manuae (Mayr, 1941) – Ofu-Olosega and Tau
- T. s. sacer (Gmelin, JF, 1788) – central and southern Tonga

== Description ==
It has a variety of calls which vary geographically. The most typical call is loud, harsh and metallic and is repeated several times. The Pacific kingfisher (Todiramphus sacer), a medium-sized tree kingfisher, typically measures around 25 cm (9.8 in) long, with a wingspan of roughly 35 cm (14 in), weighing between 51 to 100 g (1.8 to 3.5 oz), featuring striking blue-green plumage, white underparts, and a distinct orange bill.

== Distribution and habitat ==
It is most commonly found in coastal areas, particularly in mangrove swamps. It also inhabits farmland, open woodland, grassland and gardens. It is usually seen further inland than the collared kingfisher, where it was previously considered conspecific, ranging into forest or into mountain areas. Birds often perch conspicuously on wires, rocks or bare branches.

On the Pacific islands it is usually common in a variety of coastal and inland habitats with various subspecies present on the Solomon Islands, Vanuatu, Fiji, Tonga, and American Samoa.

== Behaviour and ecology ==
=== Food and feeding ===
Small crabs are the favoured food in coastal regions but a wide variety of other animals are eaten including insects, worms, snails, shrimps, frogs, lizards, small fish and sometimes other small birds and eggs as well. The bird perches almost motionless for long periods waiting for prey. When it spots something it glides down to catch it and then flies back to the perch where larger items are pounded against the branch to subdue them. Any indigestible remains are regurgitated as pellets.

=== Breeding ===
The nest is a hole, either a natural tree hole or a burrow excavated by the birds themselves in a rotten tree, termite mound or earth bank. They will also occupy old woodpecker holes. Two to seven rounded whitish eggs are laid directly on the floor of the burrow with no nest material used. Both parents take part in incubating the eggs and feeding the chicks. The young birds leave the nest about 44 days after hatching. Two broods are often raised in a year.
