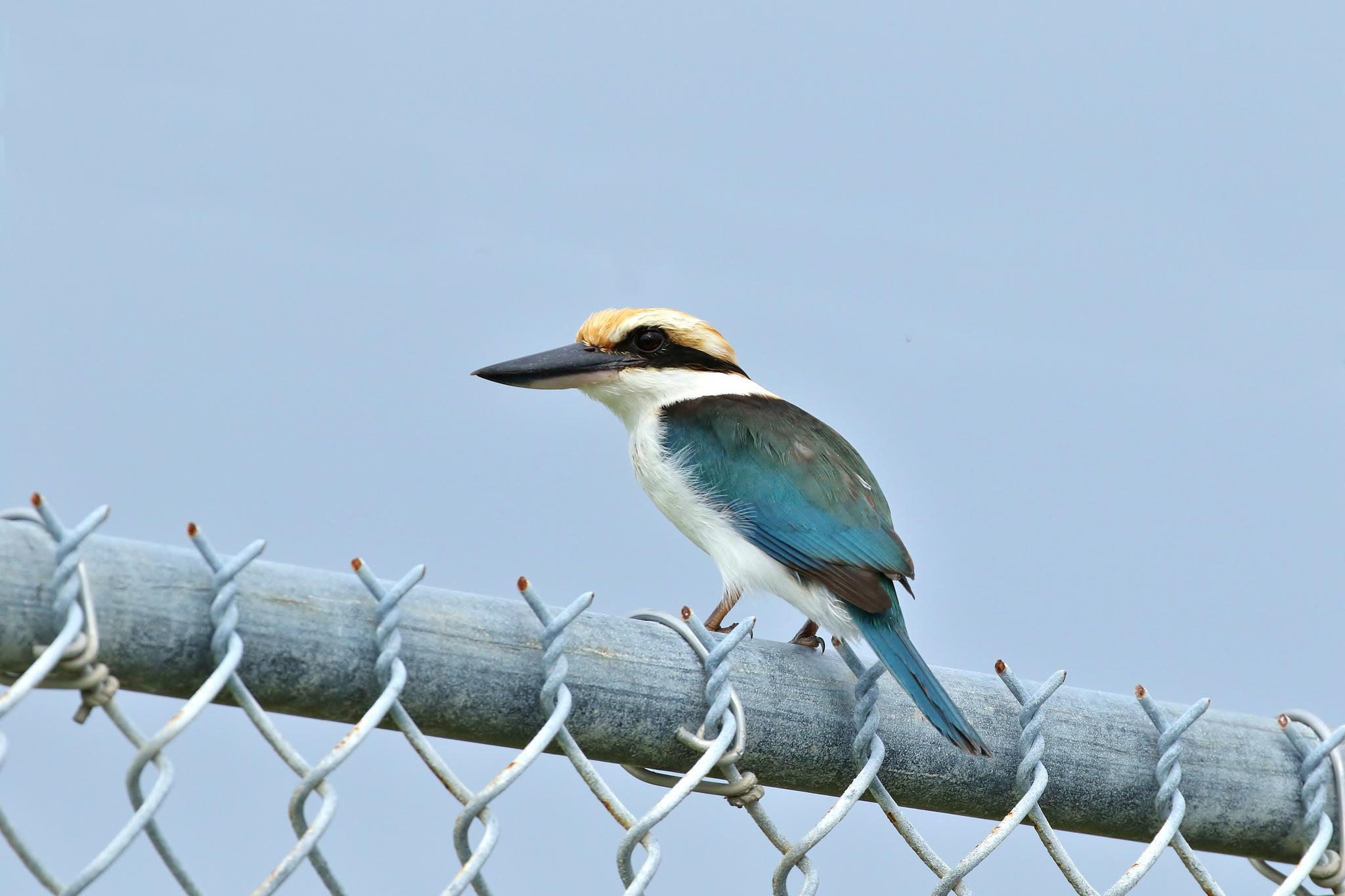

Conservation status
- Vulnerable (IUCN 3.1)

Scientific classification
- Kingdom: Animalia
- Phylum: Chordata
- Class: Aves
- Order: Coraciiformes
- Family: Alcedinidae
- Subfamily: Halcyoninae
- Genus: Todiramphus
- Species: T. reichenbachii

Binomial name
- Todiramphus reichenbachii Hartlaub, 1852

= Pohnpei kingfisher =

Species of bird

The Pohnpei kingfisher (Todiramphus reichenbachii) is a species of bird in the family Alcedinidae. It is endemic to Pohnpei. Its natural habitat is subtropical or tropical moist lowland forests. It was formerly considered to be a subspecies of the Micronesian kingfisher.

This is a brilliantly colored, medium-sized kingfisher. Adults are characterized by white underparts, while juveniles are cinnamon below. They have large laterally-flattened bills and dark legs. kingfishers defend permanent territories as breeding pairs and family groups (Kesler 2006). Both sexes care for young, and some offspring remain with parents for extended periods and through subsequent breeding attempts. (Kesler 2002). Birds apparently are obligate termitaria nesters. (Kesler and Haig 2005). Birds can be observed foraging along forest edges and from phone wires.

Like other avian species on Pohnpei island, kingfisher populations declined by 63% between 1983 and 1994 surveys (Buden 2000). The cause of Pohnpei bird declines has not yet been identified.
