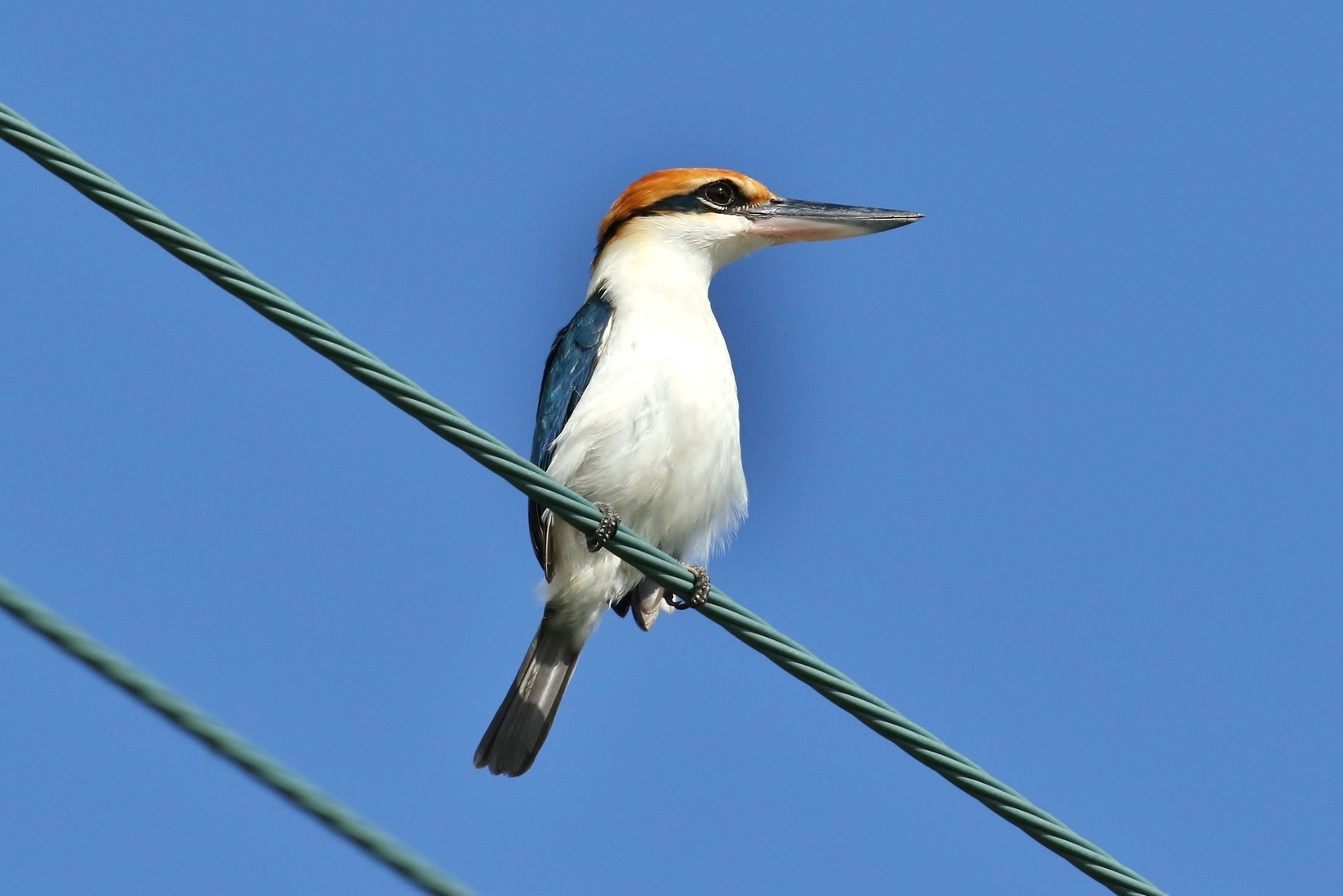

Conservation status
- Near Threatened (IUCN 3.1)

Scientific classification
- Kingdom: Animalia
- Phylum: Chordata
- Class: Aves
- Order: Coraciiformes
- Family: Alcedinidae
- Subfamily: Halcyoninae
- Genus: Todiramphus
- Species: T. pelewensis

Binomial name
- Todiramphus pelewensis (Wiglesworth, 1891)

= Rusty-capped kingfisher =

Species of bird

The rusty-capped kingfisher or Palau kingfisher (Todiramphus pelewensis) is a species of bird in the family Alcedinidae. It is endemic to Palau. The natural habitat of this species is subtropical or tropical moist lowland forests. It was formerly considered to be a subspecies of the Micronesian kingfisher.

This is a brilliantly colored, medium-sized kingfisher. Adults are characterized by white underparts with long black eyestripes, while juveniles are cinnamon below. They have large laterally-flattened bills and dark legs. Kingfishers defend permanent territories as breeding pairs and family groups. Both sexes care for young, and some offspring remain with parents for extended periods.

Little has been published about the status of rusty-capped kingfisher populations, although the US Fish and Wildlife Service has bird survey data for the region.
