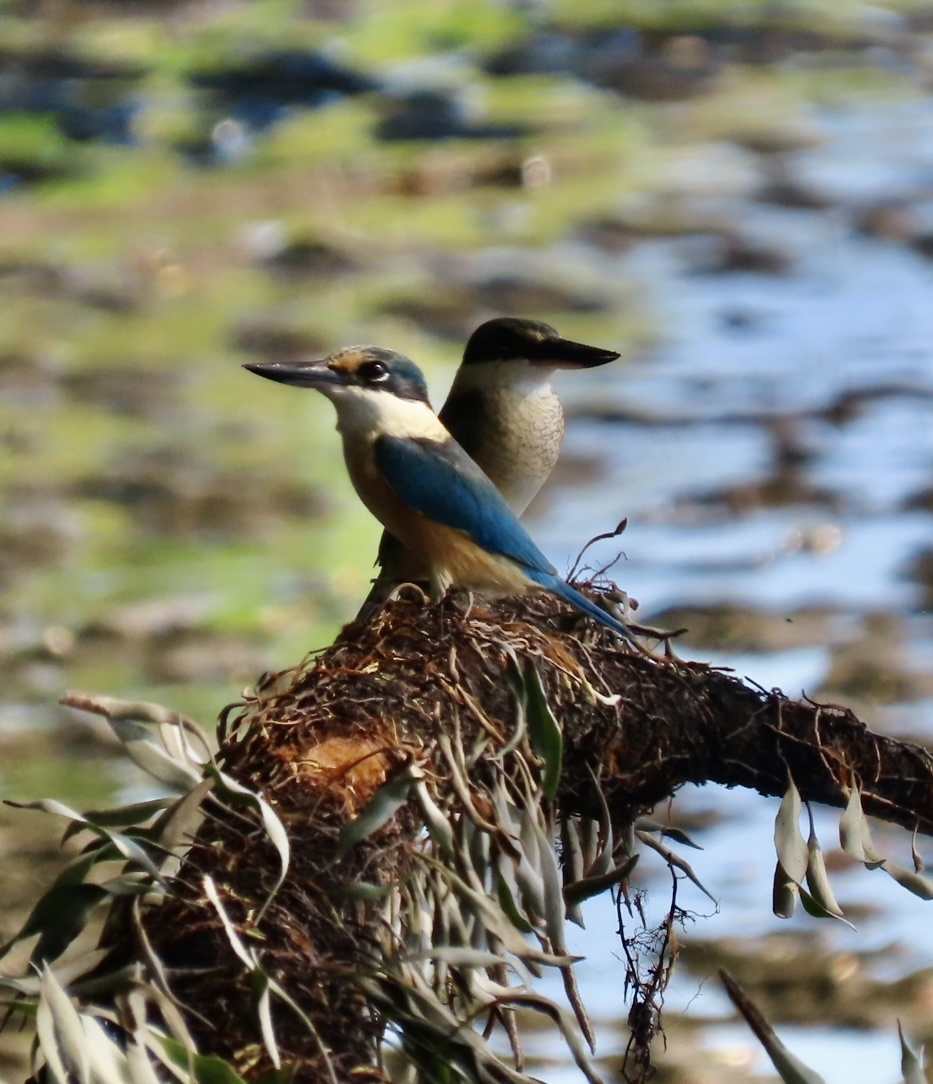

Scientific classification
- Kingdom: Animalia
- Phylum: Chordata
- Class: Aves
- Order: Coraciiformes
- Family: Alcedinidae
- Subfamily: Halcyoninae
- Genus: Todiramphus
- Species: T. tristrami

Binomial name
- Todiramphus tristrami (Layard, EL, 1880)

= Melanesian kingfisher =

Species of bird

The Melanesian kingfisher (Todiramphus tristrami) is a species of bird in the family Alcedinidae. It is endemic to the Bismarck Archipelago and the northwest and central Solomon Islands. Its natural habitats are subtropical or tropical moist lowland forests and plantations. It was formerly considered a subspecies of the collared kingfisher.

== Subspecies ==
- T. t. nusae (Heinroth, 1902) - New Hanover Island, New Ireland (except southwest), and Feni Islands
- T. t. matthiae (Heinroth, 1902) - St Matthias Islands (Bismarck Arch.)
- T. t. stresemanni (Laubmann, 1923) - islands between New Guinea and New Britain
- T. t. novaehiberniae (Hartert, 1925) - southwest New Ireland (Bismarck Arch.)
- T. t. bennetti (Ripley, 1947) Nissan Island (Bismarck Arch.)
- T. t. tristrami (Layard, EL, 1880) - New Britain (Bismarck Arch.)
- T. t. alberti (Rothschild & Hartert, 1905) Buku southeast to Guadalcanal (northwest and central Solomon Is.)
