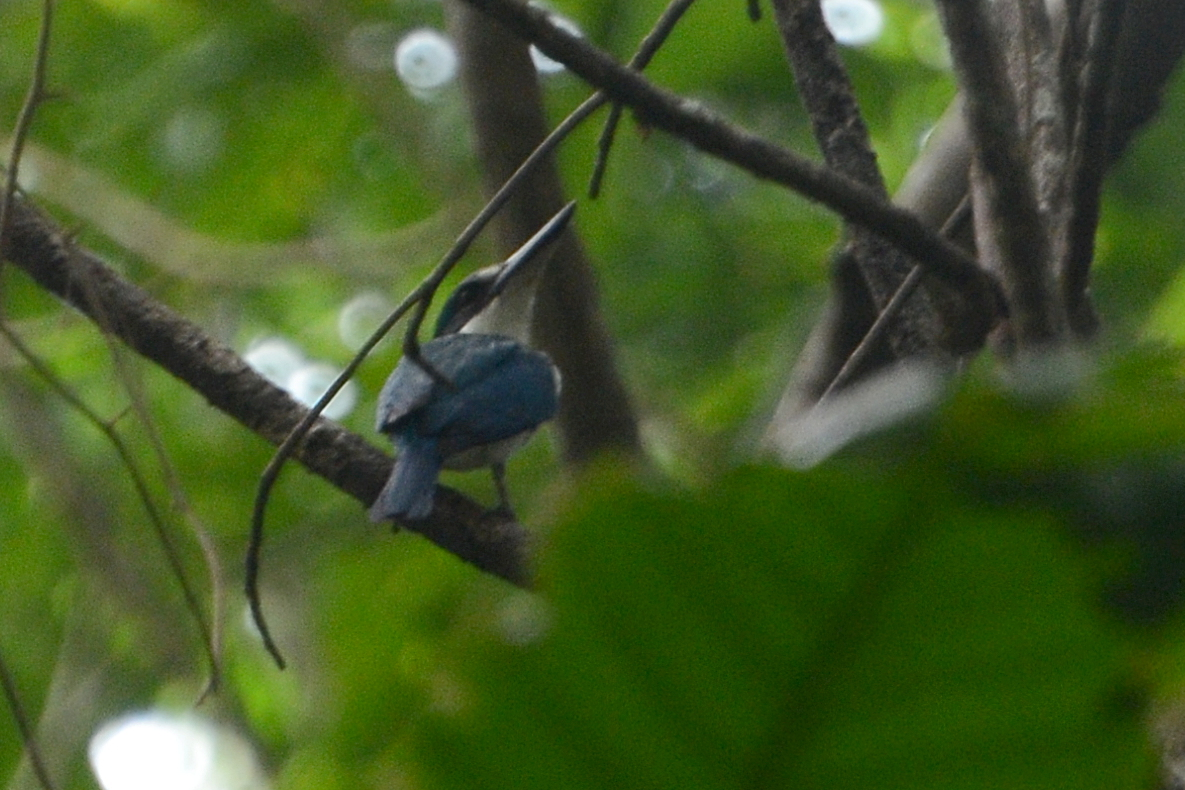

Conservation status
- Near Threatened (IUCN 3.1)

Scientific classification
- Kingdom: Animalia
- Phylum: Chordata
- Class: Aves
- Order: Coraciiformes
- Family: Alcedinidae
- Subfamily: Halcyoninae
- Genus: Todiramphus
- Species: T. enigma

Binomial name
- Todiramphus enigma (Hartert, 1904)

Synonyms
- Todirhamphus enigma (Hartert, 1904) [orth. error]

= Talaud kingfisher =

Species of bird

The Talaud kingfisher (Todiramphus enigma) is a species of bird in the family Alcedinidae.

It is endemic to the Talaud Islands north of Sulawesi in Indonesia.

Its natural habitats are subtropical or tropical moist lowland forests and rivers. It is threatened by habitat loss, but as of 2016, the population was considered stable.
