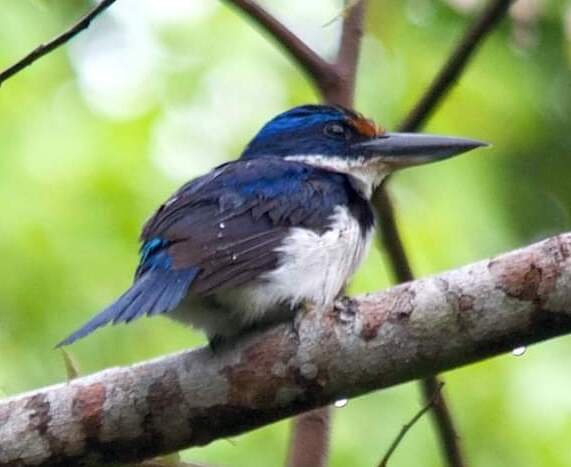

Conservation status
- Vulnerable (IUCN 3.1)

Scientific classification
- Kingdom: Animalia
- Phylum: Chordata
- Class: Aves
- Order: Coraciiformes
- Family: Alcedinidae
- Subfamily: Halcyoninae
- Genus: Todiramphus
- Species: T. winchelli

Binomial name
- Todiramphus winchelli (Sharpe, 1877)

Subspecies
- T. w. nigrorum - (Hachisuka, 1934); T. w. nesydrionetes - (Parkes, 1966); T. w. mindanensis - (Parkes, 1966); T. w. winchelli - (Sharpe, 1877); T. w. alfredi - (Oustalet, 1890)

Synonyms
- Todirhamphus winchelli (Sharpe, 1877) [orth. error] Halcyon winchelli Sharpe, 1877

= Rufous-lored kingfisher =

Species of bird

The rufous-lored kingfisher (Todiramphus winchelli), also known as Winchell's kingfisher, is a species of bird in the kingfisher family Alcedinidae. It is endemic to the Philippines, its natural habitat consists of tropical moist lowland forests. It is threatened by deforestation, and the International Union for Conservation of Nature (IUCN) has assessed it as a vulnerable species.

== Description ==
The rufous-lored kingfisher is about 25 cm (9.8 in) long. The crown is blackish-blue, with cobalt-blue edges, and the lores and neck-collar are rufous. The upperparts are mostly blackish and dark blue, with a bright azure-blue rump. The underparts are white in the male, and buff in the female. The eyes are dark brown, the beak is black, and the legs are greyish. The juvenile bird is similar to the female, but with duller plumage. The subspecies are coloured different shades of blue. A black patch on the sides of the male's breast is conspicuous in subspecies nigrorum and concealed in others, and in nesydrionetes, the female has an orange breast forming a band between the whitish throat and belly.

== Taxonomy ==
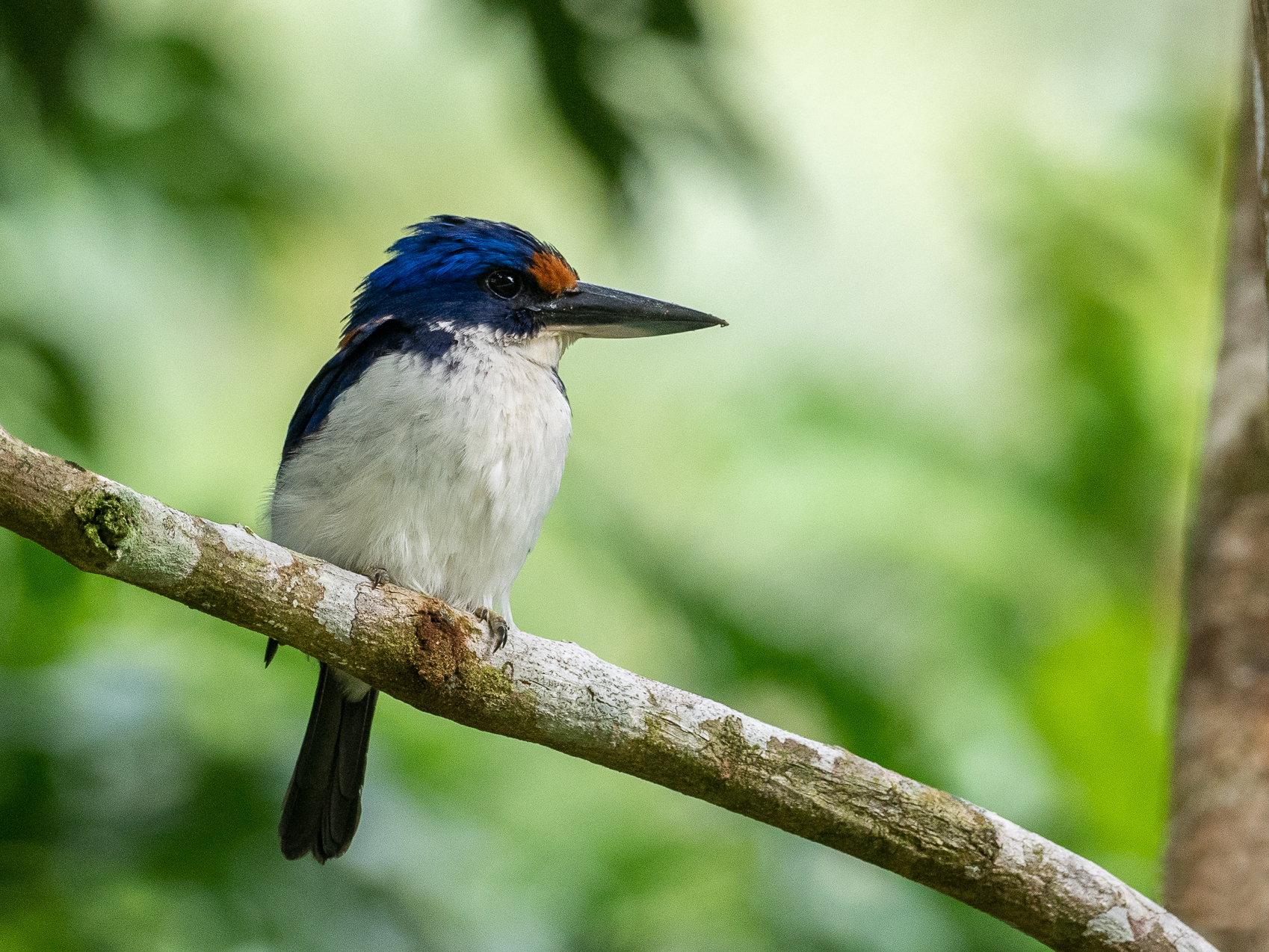
Male ssp. mindanensis

This species was described as Halcyon Winchelli by British ornithologist Richard Bowdler Sharpe in 1877, using a specimen collected by American ornithologist Joseph Beal Steere. It was named after American geologist Newton Horace Winchell, as requested by Steere. Although two subspecies were later described, they were usually considered synonymous with the nominate before 1966. That year Kenneth C. Parkes studied a series of 45 specimens and recognised five subspecies, two of which were new.

=== Subspecies ===
Five subspecies are recognized:

- T. w. winchelli– Found on Basilan
- T. w. nesydrionetes – Found on Tablas Island, Romblon and Sibuyan Island; female has orange-buff neck sides and breastband, contrasting with whitish chin/throat and belly
- T. w. nigrorum – Found on Samar, Calicoan, Biliran, Leyte, Negros, Cebu, Siquijor and Bohol; bluish-black patch at side of breast, duller and blacker upperparts
- T. w. mindanensis – Found on Mindanao and Camiguin; similar to nigorum has blue areas strongly tinged purple, female washed cinnamon or tawny-buff below
- T. w. alfredi – Found on Sulu Archipelago; male is buff below, like female of mindanensis, whereas female is even paler than that of mindanensis

== Behaviour and ecology ==
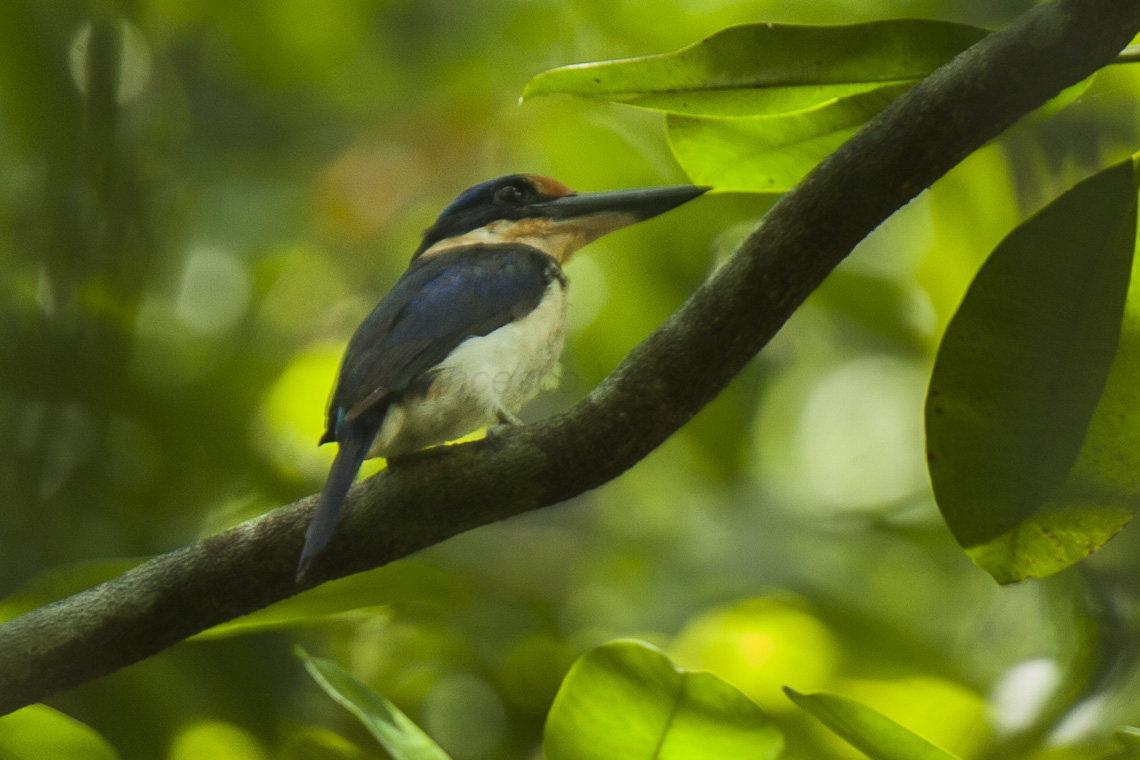

This kingfisher often perches in the canopy and sometimes descends to lower perches and to the ground, probably to feed. One of its calls is an ascending series of harsh chup and chep notes, and another consists of three rising notes and then a long descending series chu chu chu chu. Loud squawking has also been heard. It batters its prey, which consists of large insects, spiders and small vertebrates. Little is known about its breeding. Nesting in a used arboreal termite nest has been recorded.

== Habitat and Conservation status ==
This species is endemic to the Philippines, ranging from Samar and Tablas south to Mindanao, Basilan and the Sulu Archipelago. It appears to be locally common on some islands, but it is rare in other localities. It lives in forest below 1,000 m (3,300 ft) in elevation, being found in coastal lowlands and foothills. Its tolerance of degraded forest is uncertain.

The population size is estimated at 2,500–9,999 mature individuals, or 3,500–15,000 individuals in total. Forest clearance and illegal logging are causing habitat loss and a fast population decline, so the IUCN has assessed it as a vulnerable species. This species has been recorded in some protected areas, such as Mount Guiting-Guiting and Rajah Sikatuna Protected Landscape.
