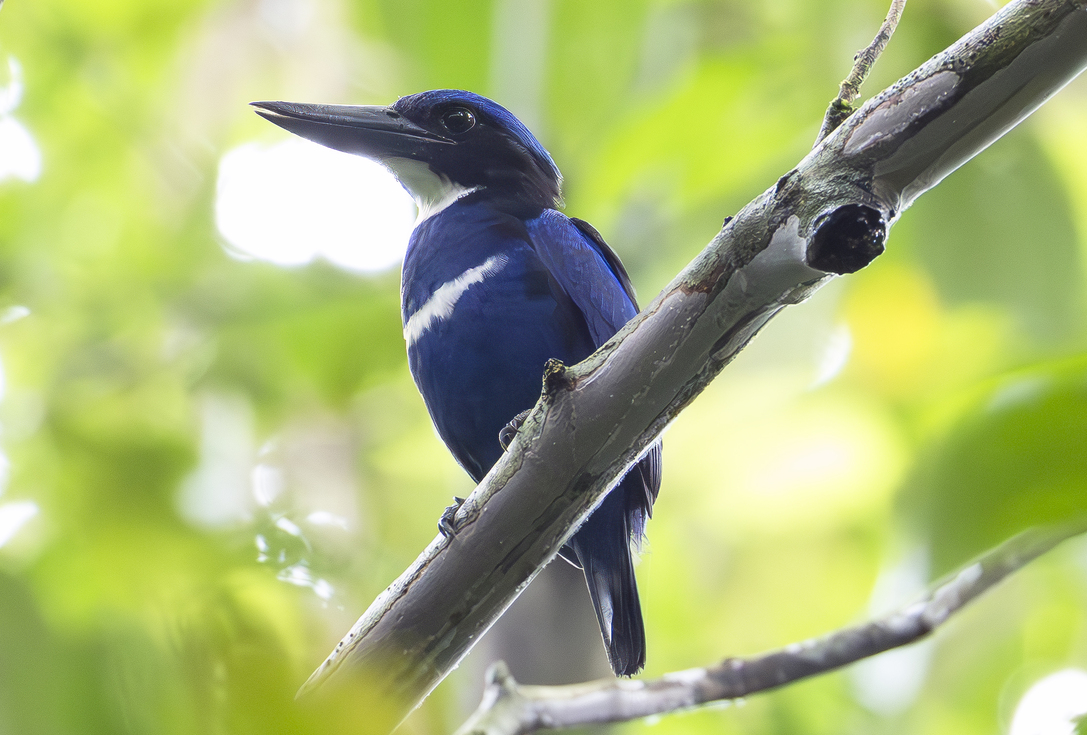

Conservation status
- Near Threatened (IUCN 3.1)

Scientific classification
- Kingdom: Animalia
- Phylum: Chordata
- Class: Aves
- Order: Coraciiformes
- Family: Alcedinidae
- Subfamily: Halcyoninae
- Genus: Todiramphus
- Species: T. nigrocyaneus

Binomial name
- Todiramphus nigrocyaneus (Wallace, 1862)

Subspecies
- T. n. nigrocyaneus - (Wallace, 1862); T. n. quadricolor - (Oustalet, 1880); T. n. stictolaemus - (Salvadori, 1876)

Synonyms
- Todirhamphus nigrocyaneus (Wallace, 1862) [orth. error]

= Blue-black kingfisher =

Species of bird

The blue-black kingfisher (Todiramphus nigrocyaneus) is a species of bird in the family Alcedinidae. A medium-sized kingfisher of mangroves and forested streams in the lowlands. It is found in New Guinea and offshore islands of Salawati, Batanta and Yapen. It is considered rare (although it may be more common in Papua) and declining with threats being logging of lowland swamp forests and declining water quality.

== Description ==
The blue-black kingfisher is 23 cm (9.1 inches) long and weighs 51–57 grams (1.8–2.0 ounces). Black face, blue crown and bright white throat are characteristic. Underparts of males vary geographically, some with rufous or dark bellies and a white crescent. Females have white belly. Perches in the understory, scanning below for its prey of fish or crabs. Very difficult to see. Somewhat similar to azure kingfisher, but blue-black kingfisher is distinctly larger with a dark chest or chest band. Call, a short nasal series "weeh-wiwiwi!" with an initial longer, rising note, then shorter falling notes.
