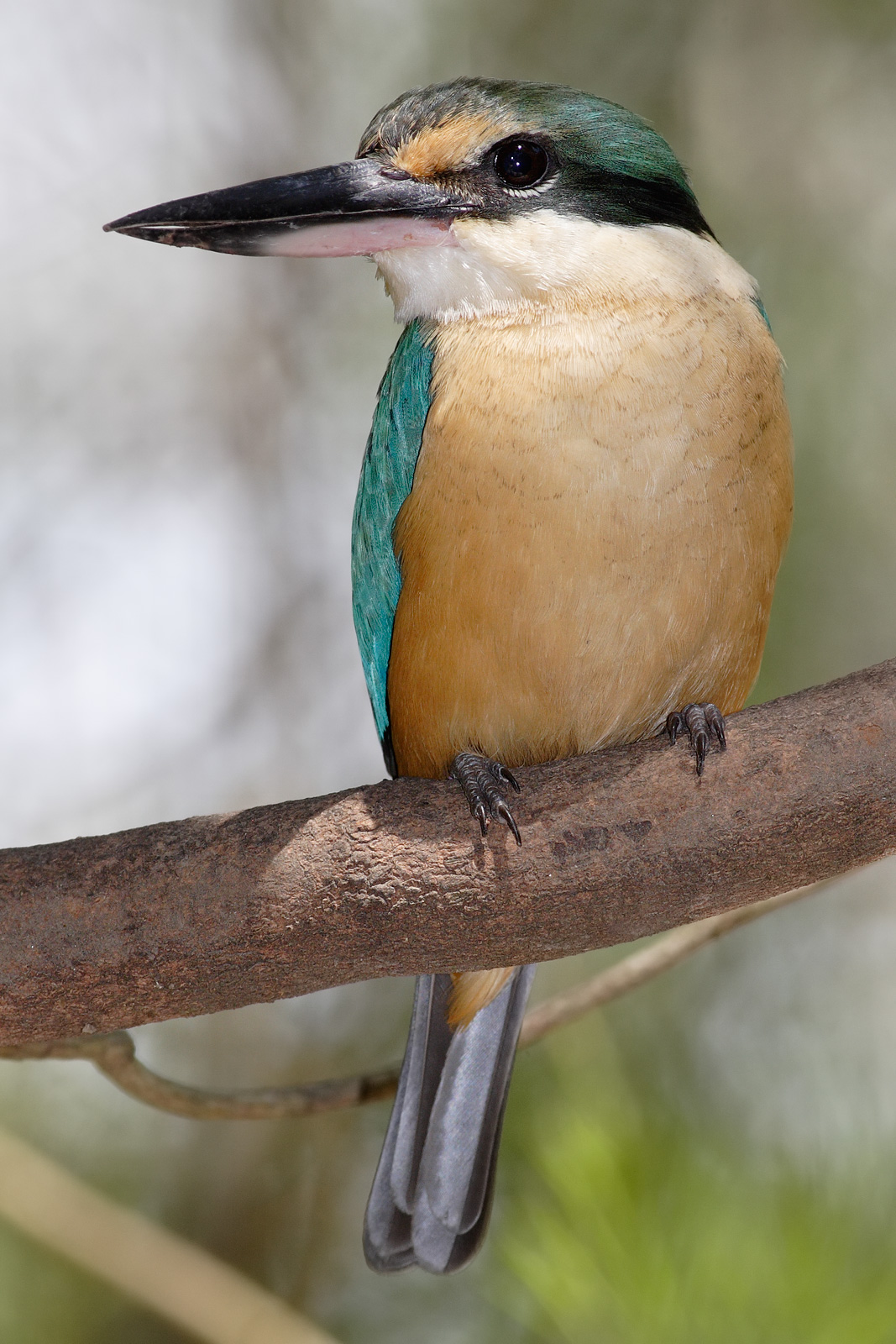
- Sacred kingfisher (Todiramphus sanctus)

Scientific classification
- Kingdom: Animalia
- Phylum: Chordata
- Class: Aves
- Order: Coraciiformes
- Family: Alcedinidae
- Subfamily: Halcyoninae
- Genus: Todiramphus; Lesson, 1827

Type species
- Todiramphus sacra Lesson, 1827

Species
- see list

= Todiramphus =

Genus of birds

Todiramphus is a genus of kingfishers in the subfamily Halcyoninae that are endemic to the Philippines, New Guinea, Australia, New Zealand and many islands in the South Pacific.

== Taxonomy ==
The genus was introduced by the French surgeon and naturalist René Lesson in 1827. The name is often spelt Todirhamphus (with rh), but Todiramphus is the original valid spelling. The name literally means "tody-bill"; tody is a relative of the kingfishers with a similar slender long bill, and the Greek rhamphos (ῥάµϕος) means "beak" or "bill".

In 1945 James Peters in his Check-list of Birds of the World placed these species in an enlarged genus Halcyon. Hilary Fry did the same in his 1992 monograph on kingfishers, but in 2001 Peter Woodall in the Handbook of the Birds of the World chose to place these Pacific flat-billed species in the resurrected genus Todiramphus. This decision was vindicated by a molecular study published in 2006 that found that the enlarged Halcyon was not monophyletic.

There are now around 30 extant species in the genus but the genus formerly contained fewer species. A molecular phylogenetic study published in 2015 found that some of the polytypic species were paraphyletic. To create monophyletic groups, some of the subspecies were promoted to species status. The most extreme case was that of the collared kingfisher (Todiramphus chloris) that was split into six species: the Pacific kingfisher, the Islet kingfisher, the Torresian kingfisher, the collared kingfisher, the Mariana kingfisher and the Melanesian kingfisher.

The range of the genus extends from the Philippines in the west to French Polynesia in the east, with the greatest diversity in Australasia.

== Description ==
Members of Todiramphus are medium-sized kingfishers with flattened beaks. They are typically blue or blue-green above with pale underparts. They often have a pale collar and stripe over the eye. Many species are commonly found well away from water and feed largely on terrestrial animals such as insects and lizards. The nest is built in a cavity, most often in a tree.

== Species ==
The genus contains 30 species:

- Blue-black kingfisher, Todiramphus nigrocyaneus
- Rufous-lored kingfisher or Winchell's kingfisher, Todiramphus winchelli
- Blue-and-white kingfisher, Todiramphus diops
- Lazuli kingfisher, Todiramphus lazuli
- Forest kingfisher, Todiramphus macleayii
- White-mantled kingfisher, Todiramphus albonotatus
- Ultramarine kingfisher, Todiramphus leucopygius
- Vanuatu kingfisher, Todiramphus farquhari
- Sombre kingfisher, Todiramphus funebris
- Collared kingfisher, Todiramphus chloris
- Torresian kingfisher, Todiramphus sordidus – split from T. chloris
- Islet kingfisher, Todiramphus colonus – split from T. chloris
- Mariana kingfisher, Todiramphus albicilla – split from T. chloris
- Melanesian kingfisher, Todiramphus tristrami – split from T. chloris
- Pacific kingfisher, Todiramphus sacer – split from T. chloris
- Talaud kingfisher, Todiramphus enigma
- Guam kingfisher, Todiramphus cinnamominus – extinct in the wild
- Rusty-capped kingfisher, Todiramphus pelewensis – split from T. cinnamominus
- Pohnpei kingfisher, Todiramphus reichenbachii – split from T. cinnamominus
- Beach kingfisher, Todiramphus saurophagus
- Sacred kingfisher, Todiramphus sanctus
- Flat-billed kingfisher, Todiramphus recurvirostris – split from T. sanctus
- Cinnamon-banded kingfisher, Todiramphus australasia
- Chattering kingfisher, Todiramphus tutus
- Mewing kingfisher, Todiramphus ruficollaris – split from T. tutus
- Society kingfisher, Todiramphus veneratus
- Mangareva kingfisher, Todiramphus gambieri
- Niau kingfisher, Todiramphus gertrudae – split from T. gambieri
- Marquesan kingfisher, Todiramphus godeffroyi
- Red-backed kingfisher, Todiramphus pyrrhopygius
