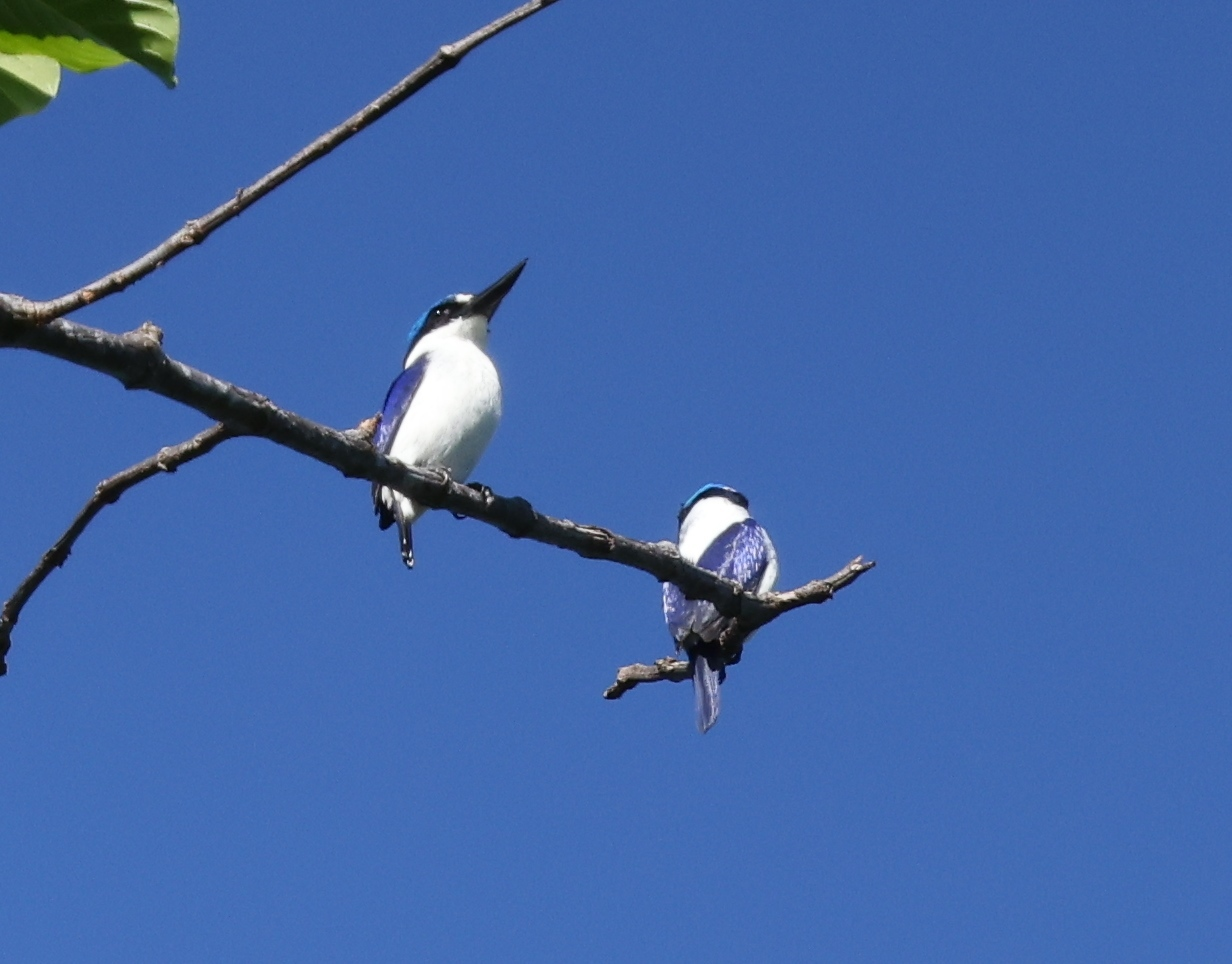

Conservation status
- Near Threatened (IUCN 3.1)

Scientific classification
- Kingdom: Animalia
- Phylum: Chordata
- Class: Aves
- Order: Coraciiformes
- Family: Alcedinidae
- Subfamily: Halcyoninae
- Genus: Todiramphus
- Species: T. albonotatus

Binomial name
- Todiramphus albonotatus (Ramsay, EP, 1884)

= White-mantled kingfisher =

Species of bird

The white-mantled kingfisher or New Britain kingfisher (Todiramphus albonotatus) is a species of bird in the family Alcedinidae. It is endemic to New Britain off Papua New Guinea. Its natural habitat is tropical moist lowland forests.

== Description ==
The white-mantled kingfisher is 16–18 cm (6.3–7.1 in) in length and has a black bill, and the plumage is mostly white in the male, with blue wings, tail, a turquoise crown, and a thick black stripe through the eye. The female is similar to the male but has blue on the lower back. The call is a rapid descending "kee-ku-ko-ko" or a trilling "ki-ki-ki-ki-ki".

It is widespread but scarce and is probably threatened by habitat loss.
