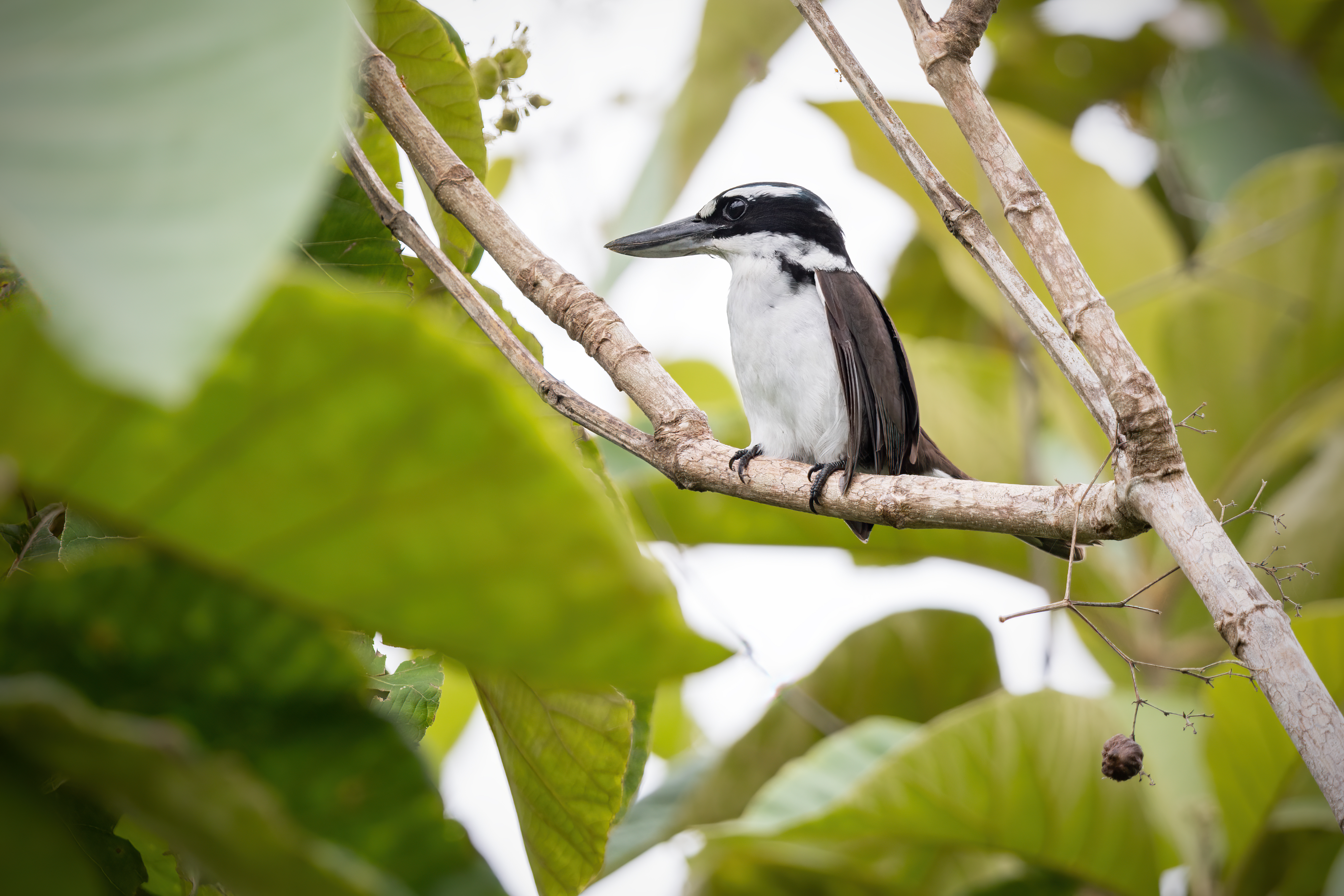

Conservation status
- Least Concern (IUCN 3.1)

Scientific classification
- Kingdom: Animalia
- Phylum: Chordata
- Class: Aves
- Order: Coraciiformes
- Family: Alcedinidae
- Subfamily: Halcyoninae
- Genus: Todiramphus
- Species: T. funebris

Binomial name
- Todiramphus funebris Bonaparte, 1850

Synonyms
- Todirhamphus funebris Bonaparte, 1850 [orth. error]

= Sombre kingfisher =

Species of bird

The sombre kingfisher (Todiramphus funebris) is a species of bird in the family Alcedinidae. It is endemic to island of Halmahera, in North Maluku, Indonesia.

Its natural habitats are subtropical or tropical moist lowland forest, subtropical or tropical mangrove forest, subtropical or tropical swamps, and plantations. It is threatened by habitat loss.

== Description ==
This is a relatively large kingfisher, measuring up to 28 cm (11 in). It has a piebald colouring with white belly and collar, and olive to black upper parts. The beak is dark. Its call is a slow 'ki-ki-ki'; it may also utter series of three loud wails.

== Distribution and habitat ==
The sombre kingfisher occurs only on Halmahera, where it inhabits primary forest (frequently close to clearings), swamp-forest, mature secondary woodland, and mangroves. It may visit cultivated areas such as plantations.

== Conservation ==
The species has been protected under Indonesian law since 1931 and benefits from several protected areas. However, it is currently classified as Least concern by the IUCN.
