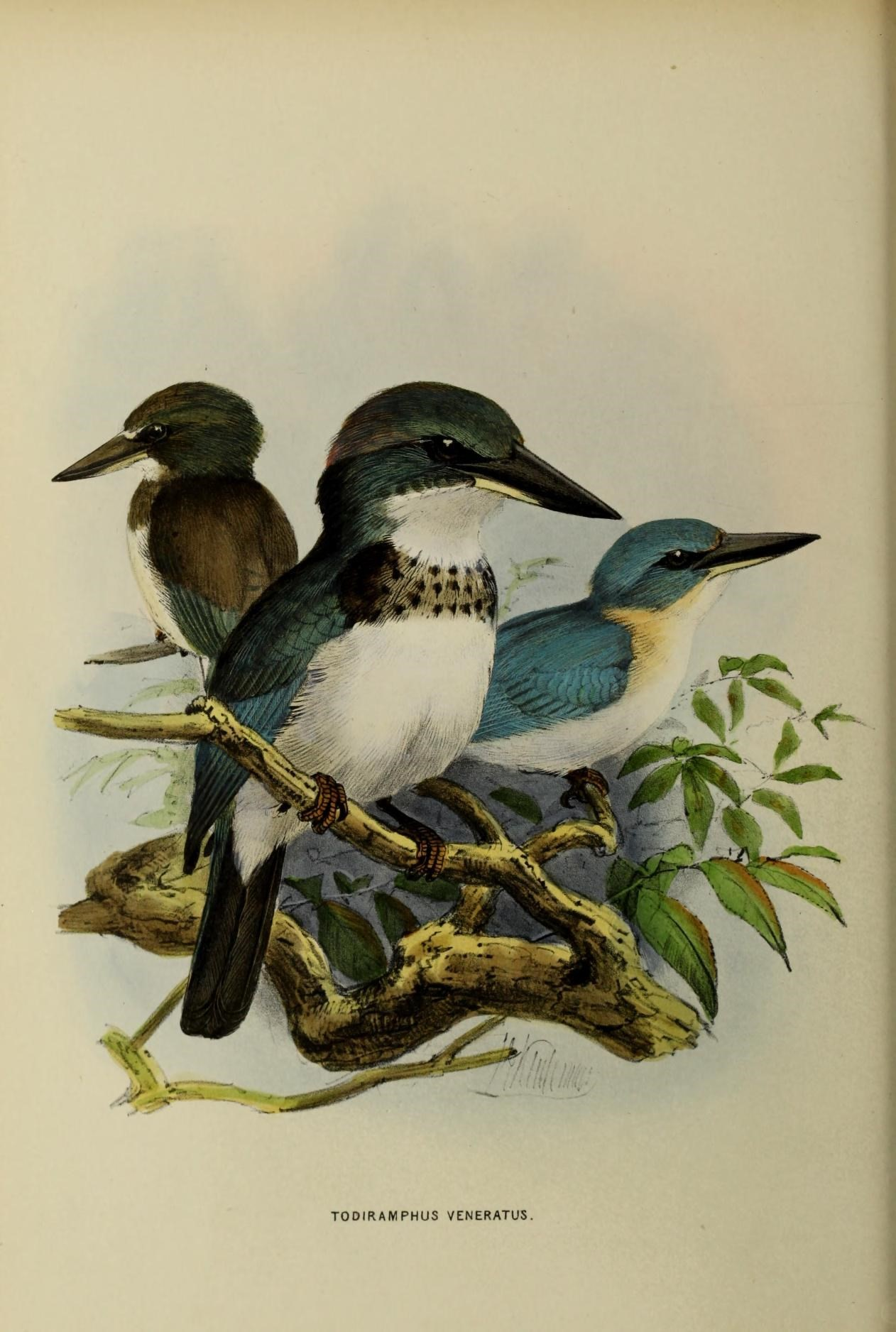
- illustration by John Gerrard Keulemans
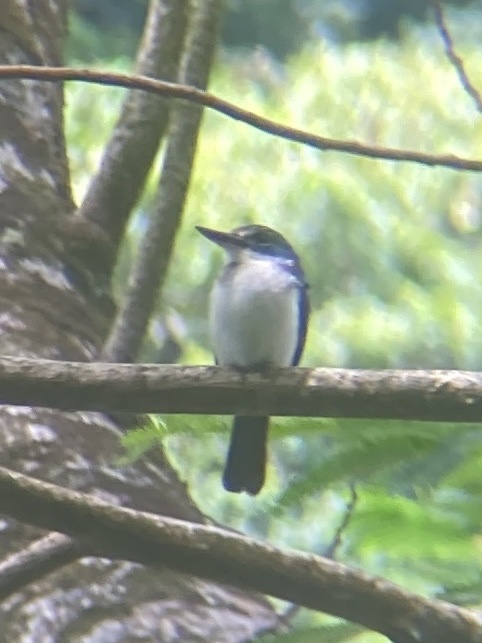

Conservation status
- Near Threatened (IUCN 3.1)

Scientific classification
- Kingdom: Animalia
- Phylum: Chordata
- Class: Aves
- Order: Coraciiformes
- Family: Alcedinidae
- Subfamily: Halcyoninae
- Genus: Todiramphus
- Species: T. veneratus

Binomial name
- Todiramphus veneratus (Gmelin, JF, 1788)

= Society kingfisher =

Species of bird

The Society kingfisher or Tahiti kingfisher (Todiramphus veneratus) is a species of bird in the family Alcedinidae. It is endemic to the Society Islands of French Polynesia. Its natural habitats are subtropical or tropical moist lowland forest and subtropical or tropical moist montane forest.

== Taxonomy ==
The Society kingfisher was formally described in 1788 by the German naturalist Johann Friedrich Gmelin in his revised and expanded edition of Carl Linnaeus's Systema Naturae. He placed it with the other kingfishers in the genus Alcedo and coined the binomial name Alcedo venerata. Gmelin based his description on the "venerated kingsfisher", which had been described in 1782 by the English ornithologist John Latham in his multi-volume A General Synopsis of Birds. Latham had access to a specimen in the Leverian Museum that he erroneously believed had come from the "Friendly Islands", now Tonga in western Polynesia. Latham noted that the Polynesians revered and protected kingfishers. The specimen would have been collected during either James Cook's second or third voyages to the Pacific Ocean. Three water-colour drawings that are believed to depict the Society kingfisher survive from Cook's voyages: one by the naturalist Georg Forster, which was painted on Cook's second voyage; one by William Wade Ellis, which was painted on Cook's third voyage; and one by the artist John Webber, which was also from the third voyage.

The Society kingfisher is now one of 30 species in the genus Todiramphus, which was introduced in 1827 by René Lesson. The word Todiramphus combines the genus name Todus with the Ancient Greek rhamphos, meaning "bill". The specific epithet veneratus is Latin meaning "venerated".

Two subspecies are recognised:

- T. v. veneratus (Gmelin, JF, 1788) – Tahiti (Society Islands, east Polynesia)
- T. v. youngi Sharpe, 1892 – Moorea (20 km (12 mi) west of Tahiti, Society Islands, east Polynesia)

== Description ==
The Society kingfisher is around 21 cm (8.3 in) in overall length. The male of the nominate subspecies on Tahiti has dull olive upperparts with a brownish blue-green head and an aquamarine area behind the eye and on the ear coverts. The underparts are white with a variable broad rusty chest-band. The female on Tahiti is dusky brown above and has a prominent brown breast-band. The male of T. v. youngi on Moorea is pale brown above.
