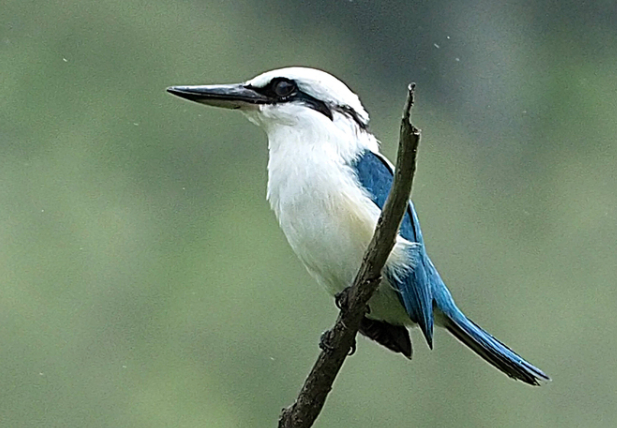

Conservation status
- Critically Endangered (IUCN 3.1)

Scientific classification
- Kingdom: Animalia
- Phylum: Chordata
- Class: Aves
- Order: Coraciiformes
- Family: Alcedinidae
- Subfamily: Halcyoninae
- Genus: Todiramphus
- Species: T. godeffroyi

Binomial name
- Todiramphus godeffroyi (Finsch, 1877)

Synonyms
- Todirhamphus godeffroyi (Finsch, 1877) [orth. error]; Halcyon godeffroyi (Collar and Andrew, 1988)

= Marquesan kingfisher =

Species of bird

The Marquesan kingfisher or Marquesas kingfisher (Todiramphus godeffroyi) is a species of bird in the family Alcedinidae. It is endemic to French Polynesia. It is threatened by habitat loss and predation by introduced species, and is currently classified as Critically endangered, with fewer than 500 individuals left in the wild.

== Description ==
This unique bird is approximately 22 cm (9 in) tall with a buff triangle on its upper back. It has completely white plumage on its crown, mantle, forehead, and center upper back along with featuring a blue eye-stripe pattern ending as broken line behind head. It also has a pale blue lower back, rump, tail and wings.

== Distribution and habitat ==
The species occurs only on the Marquesas Islands, French Polynesia. It inhabits tropical moist lowland forests, where it prefers thick, humid vegetation along mountain streams and valleys. This bird also has been observed in coconut plantations and on dry slopes covered with mango trees.

== Ecology ==
The species has been reported as nesting in mango trees and decayed hollows of pine trees. Its diet consists of a variety of insects and small vertebrates, mostly lizards.

== Conservation ==
The Marquesan kingfisher is critically endangered and currently likely numbers less than 500 individuals. The population has rapidly declined in recent decades, and it has become extinct on several smaller islands of the group, being reported only from Tahuata in 2011. Its forest habitat suffers from the presence of introduced species like feral cattle, horses, sheep, goats, and pigs. It is also subject to predation by the introduced great horned owl, the common myna and the black rat.
