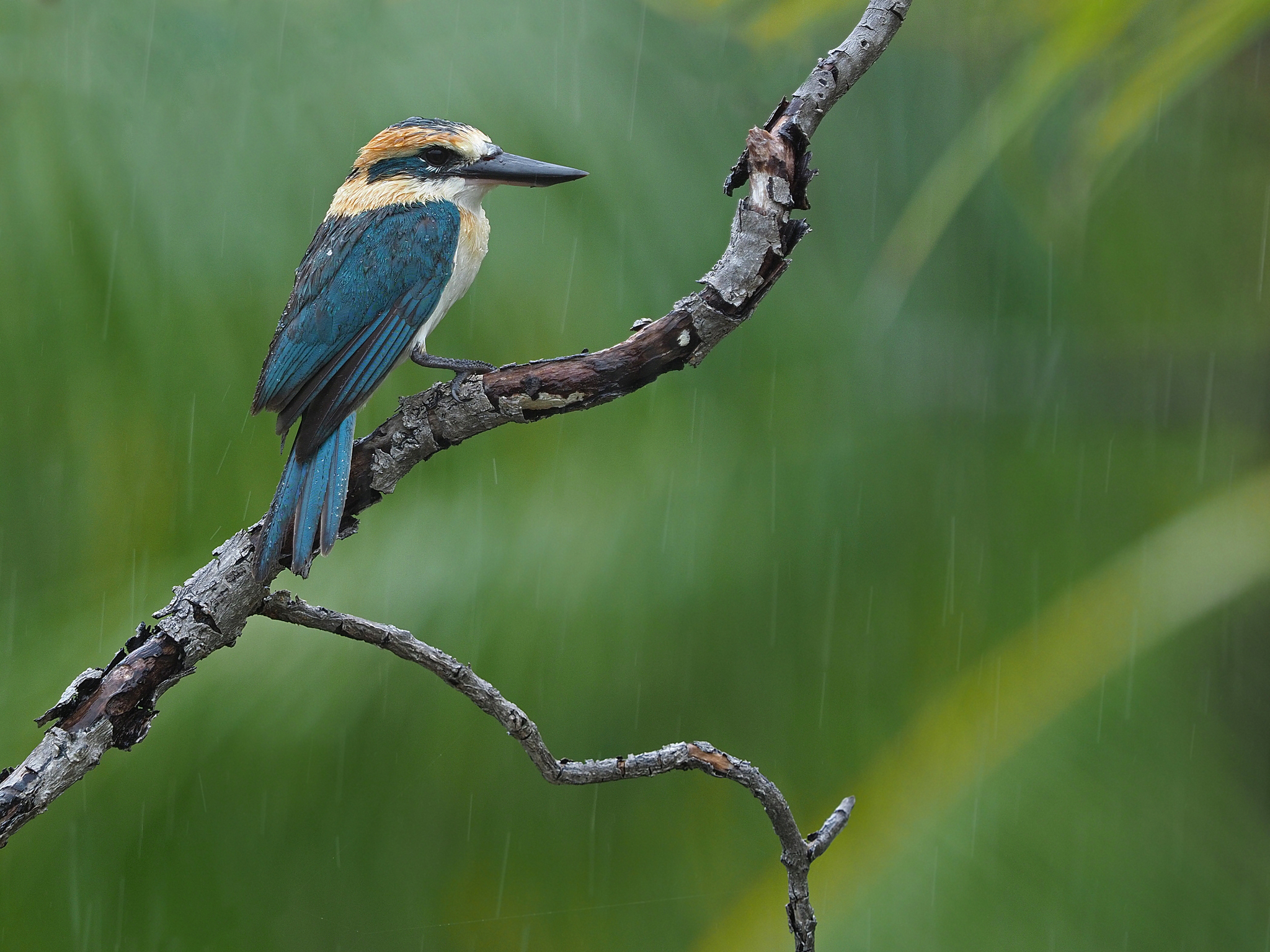

Conservation status
- Critically Endangered (IUCN 3.1)

Scientific classification
- Kingdom: Animalia
- Phylum: Chordata
- Class: Aves
- Order: Coraciiformes
- Family: Alcedinidae
- Subfamily: Halcyoninae
- Genus: Todiramphus
- Species: T. gertrudae

Binomial name
- Todiramphus gertrudae Murphy, 1924

Synonyms
- Todirhamphus gambieri gertrudae (Murphy, 1924)

= Niau kingfisher =

Species of bird

The Niau kingfisher (Todiramphus gertrudae) is a species of bird in the family Alcedinidae. It is endemic to the island of Niau in French Polynesia. Its natural habitats are subtropical or tropical dry forests, plantations and rural gardens. Only 125 individuals remain in the wild.

The introduction of other competitive species (such as Felis catus) into the kingfishers habitat led to their decrease in population because of competition for the same food sources. Removal of the new species would likely result in a recovery of the Kingfisher population, at least in the most populated areas.

Clements has merged this bird with the Mangareva kingfisher.

== Diet ==
They mainly eat terrestrial arthropods—beetles, Hymenoptera, and Dictyoptera,—and lizards—skinks and geckos. Their diet also includes decapods. They forage within coconut groves.
