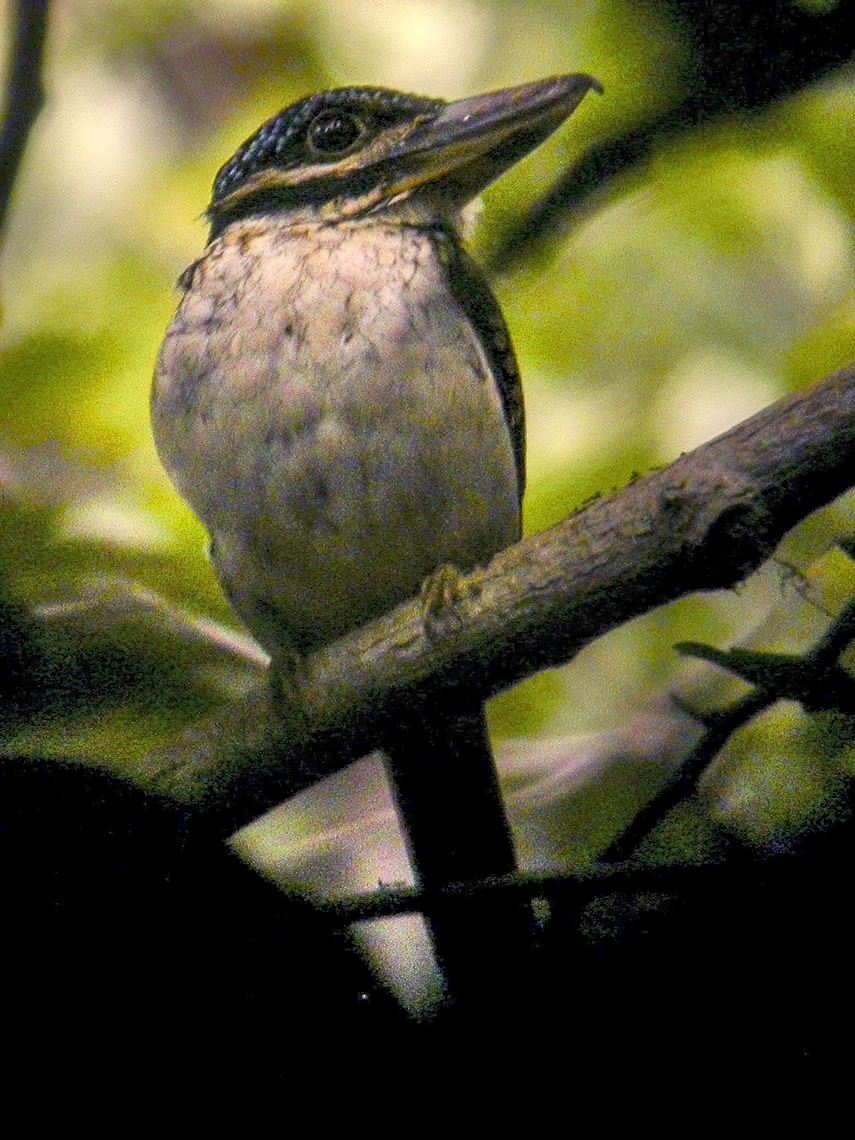

Conservation status
- Least Concern (IUCN 3.1)

Scientific classification
- Kingdom: Animalia
- Phylum: Chordata
- Class: Aves
- Order: Coraciiformes
- Family: Alcedinidae
- Subfamily: Halcyoninae
- Genus: Melidora; Lesson, 1830
- Species: M. macrorrhina

Binomial name
- Melidora macrorrhina (Lesson, 1827)

= Hook-billed kingfisher =

Species of bird

The hook-billed kingfisher (Melidora macrorrhina) is a species of kingfisher in the subfamily Halcyoninae that is resident in the lowland forested areas of New Guinea and some of the nearby islands. It is the only member of the genus Melidora.

== Taxonomy ==
The first formal description of the hook-billed kingfisher was by the French surgeon and naturalist René Lesson in 1827 under the binomial name Dacelo macrorrhina. The hook-billed kingfisher is now the only species placed within the genus Melidora which was introduced by Lesson in 1830. The name of the genus probably comes from the classical Greek mēlis for "yellow" and doru for "spear". The specific epithet macrorrhina is from the classical Greek makros for "long" and rhis for "nose".

There are three subspecies:

- M. m. waigiuensis Hartert, 1930 – Waigeo Island
- M. m. macrorrhina (Lesson, R, 1827) – west, central, and east New Guinea, Misool and Batanta Islands
- M. m. jobiensis Salvadori, 1880 – north New Guinea and Yapen Island

== Description ==
The hook-billed kingfisher is a large dumpy kingfisher with a length of 27 cm (11 in) and a weight of 85–110 g (3.0–3.9 oz). It has a long, white stripe below its eyes. Its underside is white. It has dull yellow feet.

The call and song are mainly given at night. The most common call is a long whistle followed by a series of higher pitched short notes.

== Behaviour ==
=== Breeding ===
The hook-billed kingfisher excavates a nest chamber in an active arboreal termite nest 3–6 m (10–20 ft) above the ground. The clutch is two white eggs which hatch asynchronously. The male helps to incubate the eggs and brood the young.

=== Feeding ===
It feeds on insects and frogs. It may dig into the soil searching for prey in a similar manner to the shovel-billed kookaburra.
