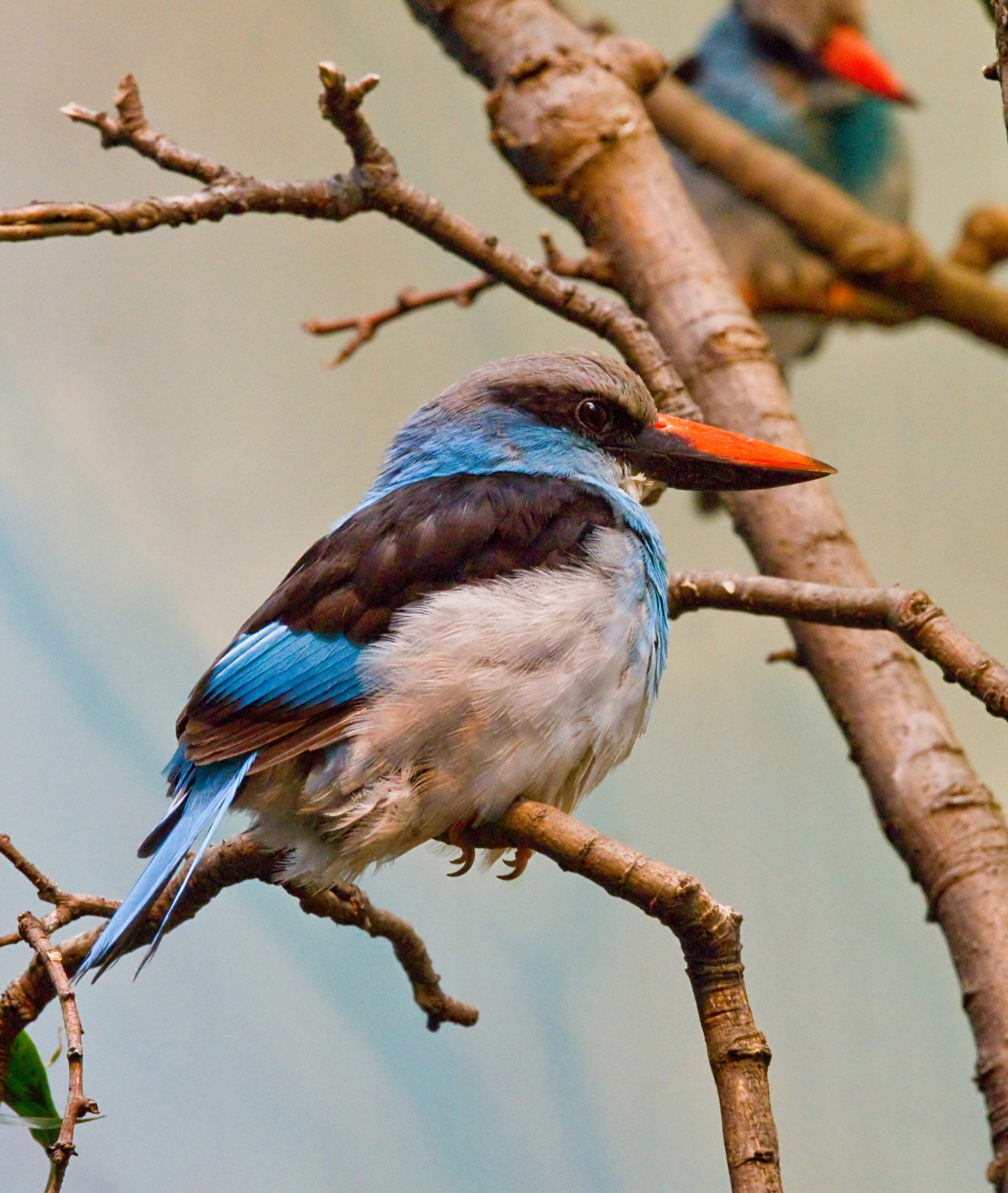
- Taken at the Cincinnati Zoo

Conservation status
- Least Concern (IUCN 3.1)

Scientific classification
- Kingdom: Animalia
- Phylum: Chordata
- Class: Aves
- Order: Coraciiformes
- Family: Alcedinidae
- Subfamily: Halcyoninae
- Genus: Halcyon
- Species: H. malimbica

Binomial name
- Halcyon malimbica (Shaw, 1812)

Subspecies
- H. m. torquata - Swainson, 1837; H. m. forbesi - Sharpe, 1892; H. m. dryas - Hartlaub, 1854; H. m. malimbica - (Shaw, 1812)

= Blue-breasted kingfisher =

Species of bird

The blue-breasted kingfisher (Halcyon malimbica) is a tree kingfisher widely distributed across Equatorial Africa. This kingfisher is essentially resident, but retreats from drier savanna areas to wetter habitats in the dry season.

This is a large kingfisher, 25 cm in length. The adult has a bright blue head, back, wing panel and tail. Its underparts are white, but it has a blue breast band. The shoulders are black. The flight of the blue-breasted kingfisher is rapid and direct. The large bill has a red upper mandible and black lower mandible. The legs are bright red.

Sexes are similar, but juveniles are duller than adults. The call of this noisy kingfisher is a whistled pu-pu-pu-pu-ku-ku-ku-ku.

The blue-breasted kingfisher is a species of a variety of well-wooded habitats. It perches quietly in deep shade whilst seeking food. It is territorial but wary. This species mainly hunts large insects, arthropods, fish and frogs, but will also eat the fruit of the Oil Palm.

It has a striking display in which the wings are spread to show the white linings. The nest is a hole in a tree termite nest. A single clutch of two round white eggs is typical.

== Subspecies ==
- H. m. malimbica: Riverine woodlands of Cameroon to Uganda and Zambia
- H. m. forbesi: Sierra Leone to East Nigeria and extreme West Cameroon; Bioko I.
- H. m. torquata: S Senegambia and Guinea-Bissau to extreme West Mali
- H. m. dryas: Príncipe Island. and (formerly) São Tomé Island, São Tomé and Príncipe
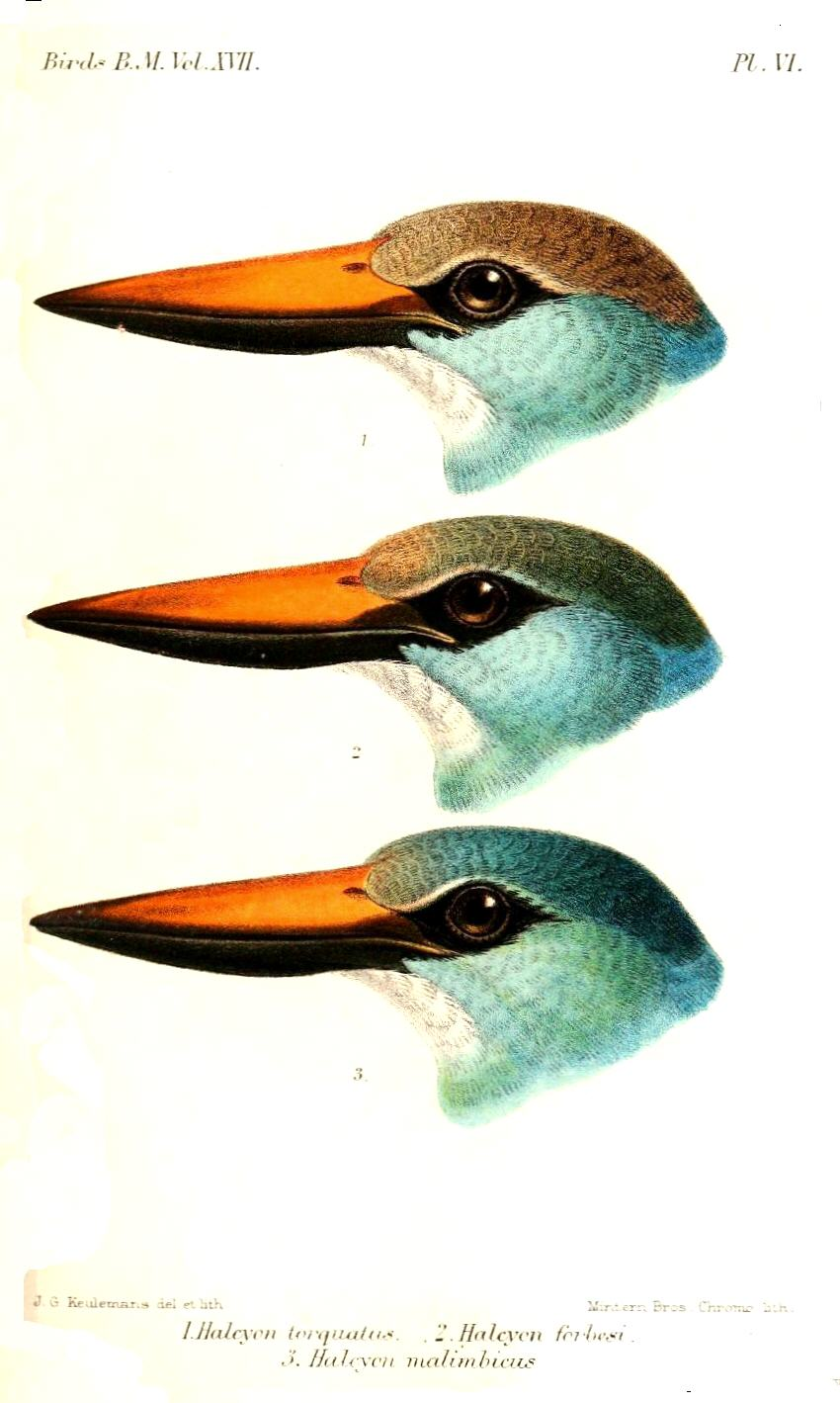
Heads of three subspecies: H. m. torquata (top); H. m. forbesi (middle); H. m. malimbica (bottom); illustration by Keulemans, 1892

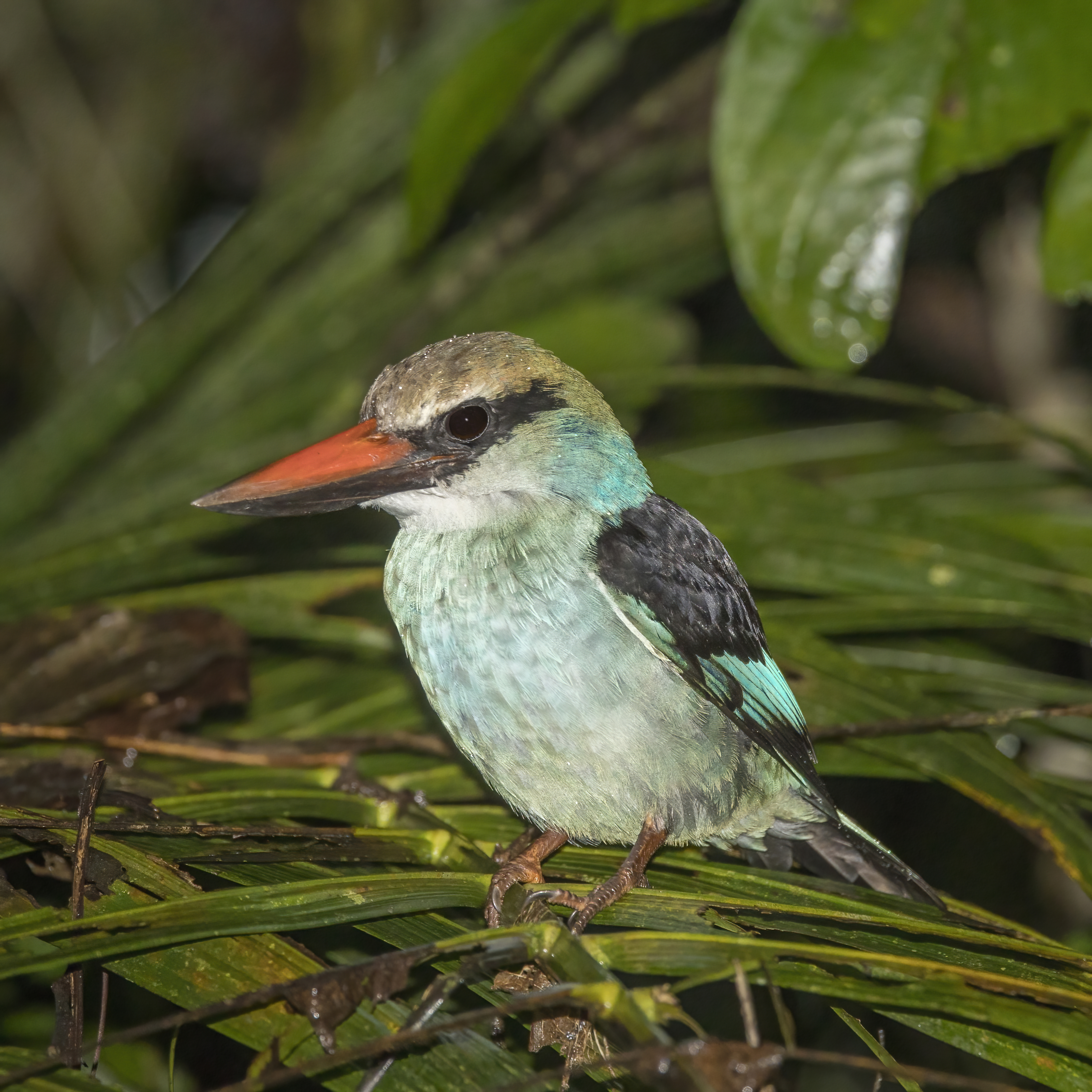
H. m. dryas
São Tomé and Príncipe
