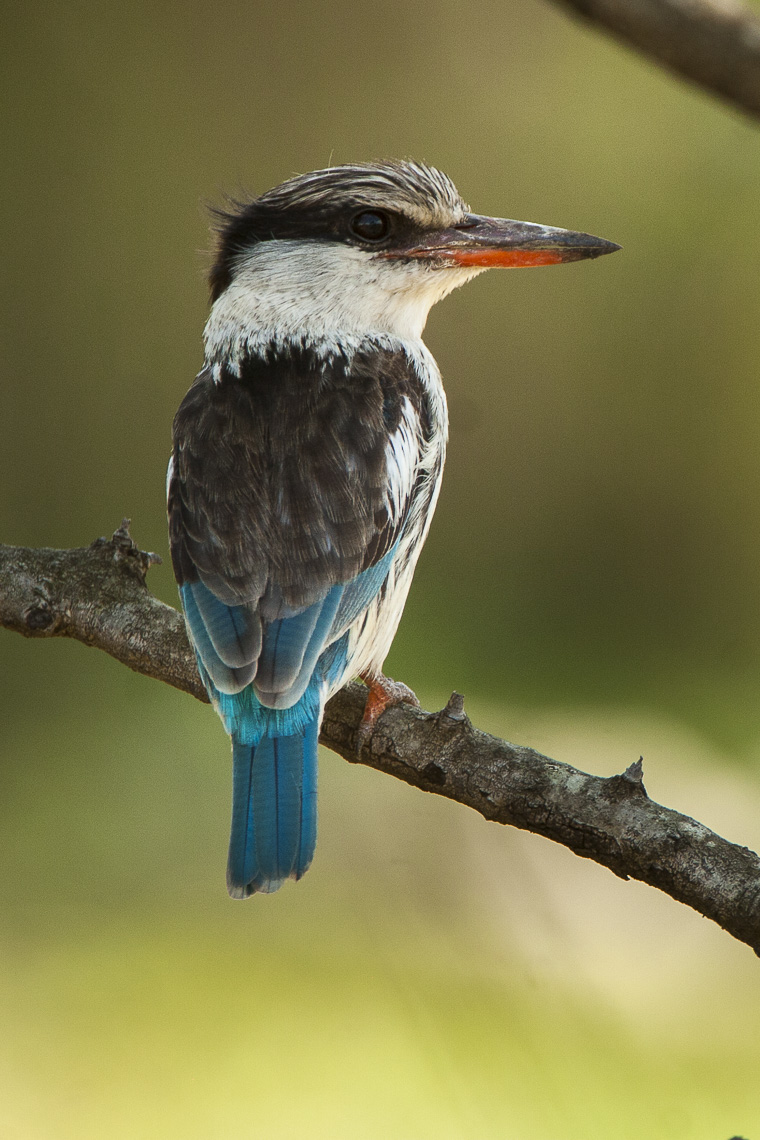

Conservation status
- Least Concern (IUCN 3.1)

Scientific classification
- Kingdom: Animalia
- Phylum: Chordata
- Class: Aves
- Order: Coraciiformes
- Family: Alcedinidae
- Subfamily: Halcyoninae
- Genus: Halcyon
- Species: H. chelicuti

Binomial name
- Halcyon chelicuti (Stanley, 1814)

Subspecies
- H. c. eremogiton - Hartert, 1921; H. c. chelicuti - (Stanley, 1814)

= Striped kingfisher =

Species of bird

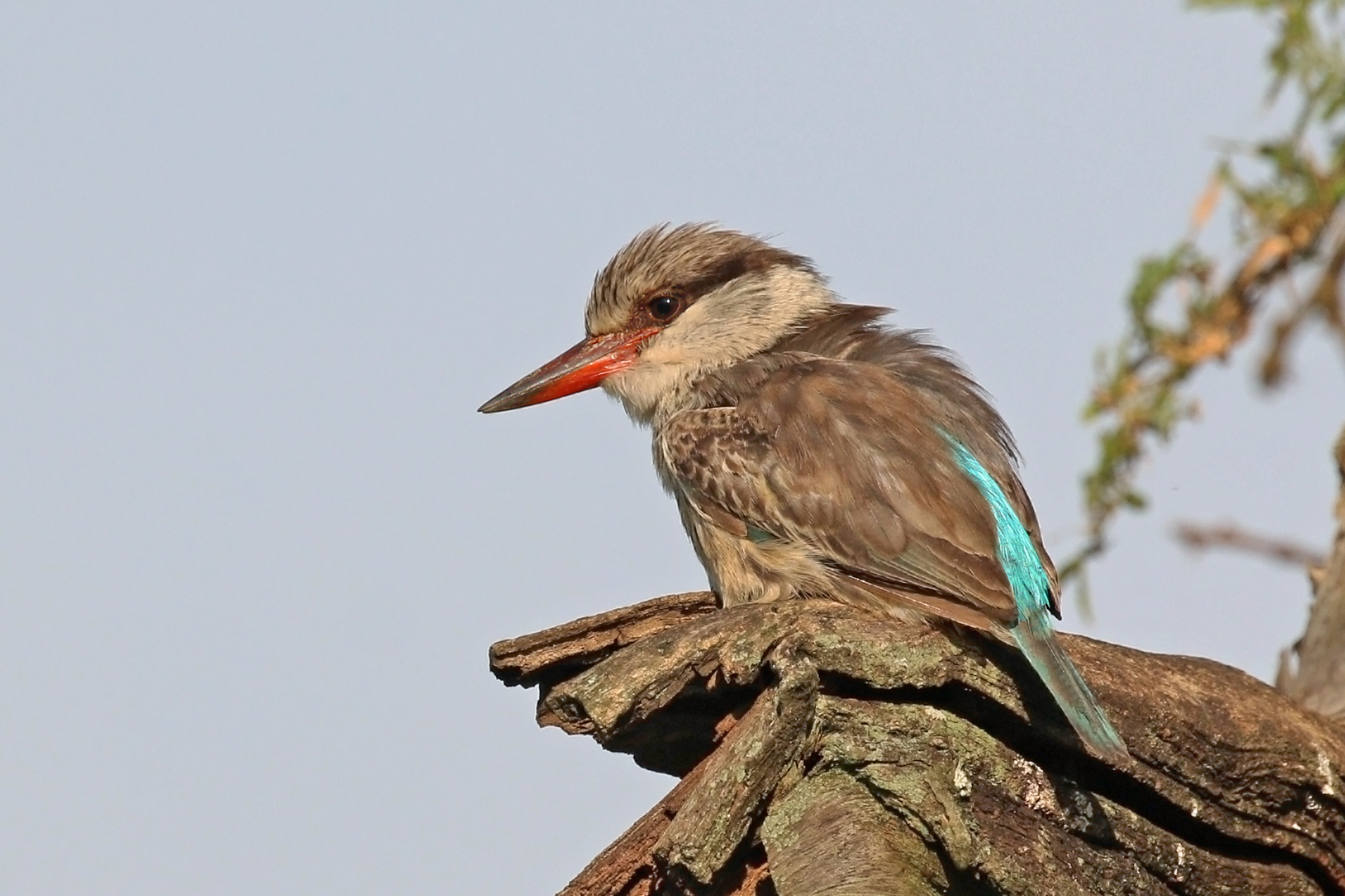
Juvenile H. c. chelicuti, Uganda

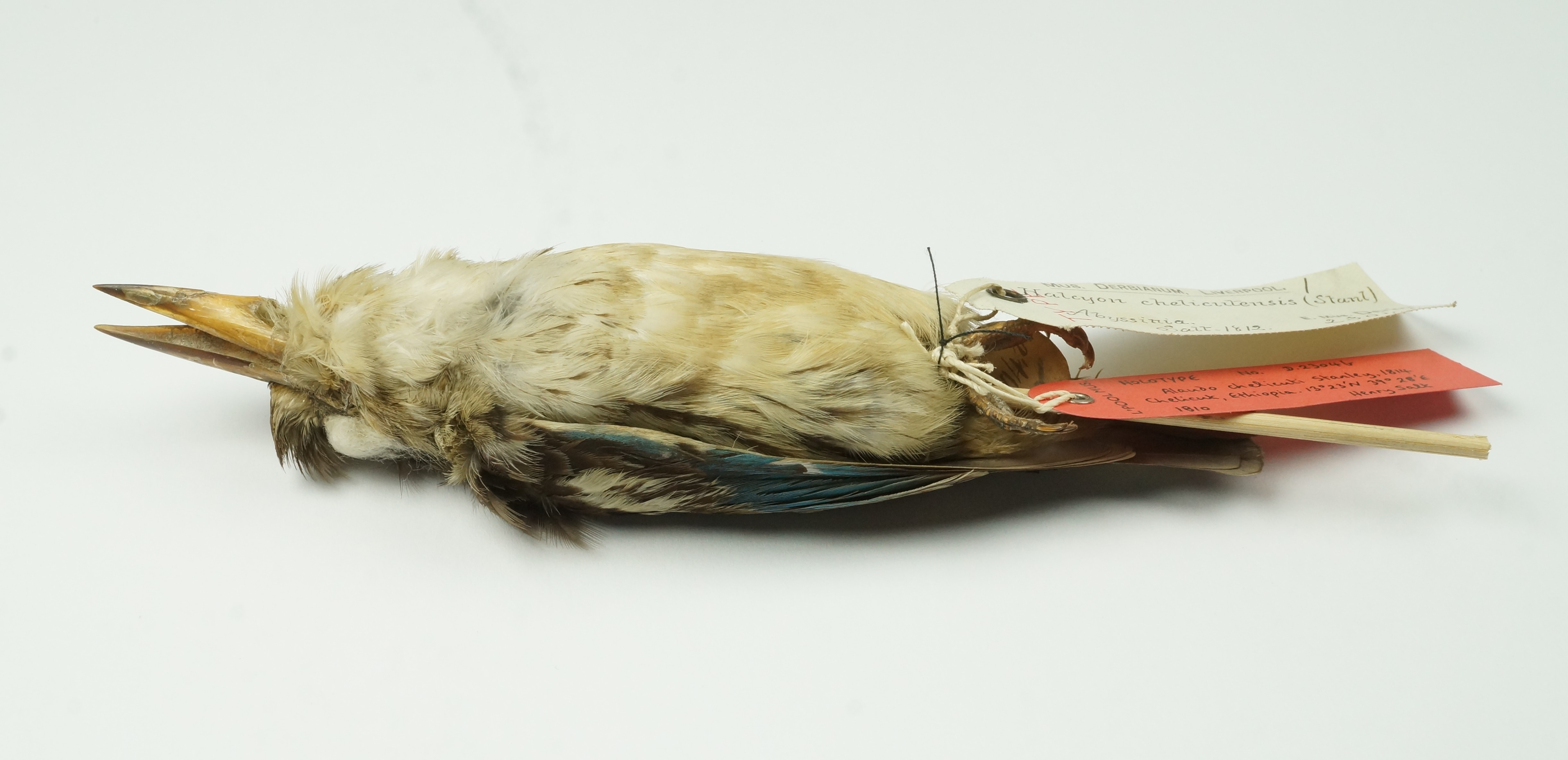
Holotype of Alaudo chelicuti Stanley (NML-VZ D2304b) held at World Museum, National Museums Liverpool

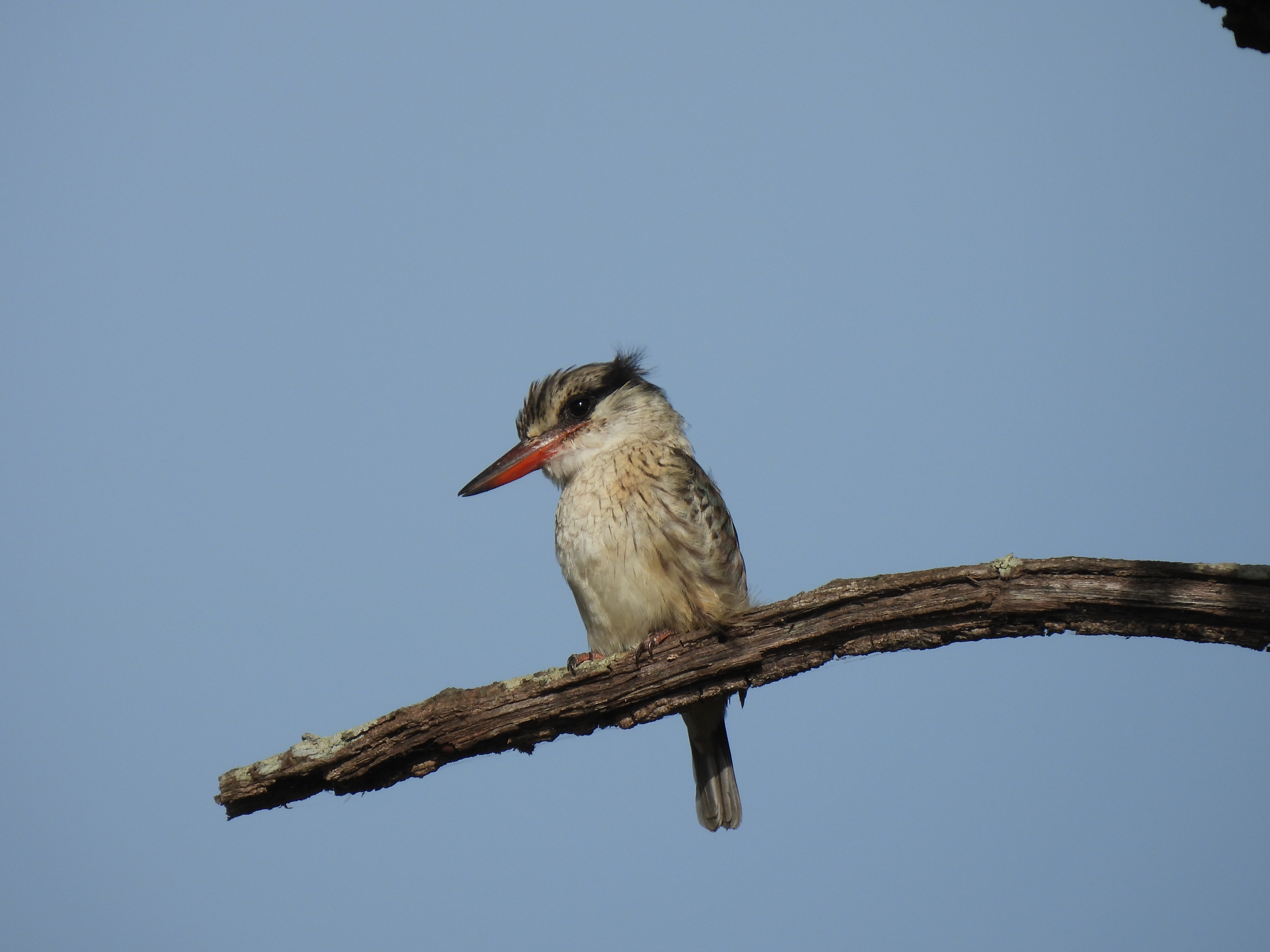
Striped Kingfisher (juv.) in The Gambia

The striped kingfisher (Halcyon chelicuti) is a species of bird in the tree kingfisher subfamily. It was first described by Edward, Lord Stanley, in Salt's Voyage to Abyssinia in 1814 as "Chelicut kingfisher" Alaudo Chelicuti.

The genus name Halcyon comes from a bird in Greek legend generally associated with the kingfisher. There was an ancient belief that the halcyon nested on the sea, which it calmed in order to lay its eggs on a floating nest. The species' name chelicuti derives from Chelicut in Ethiopia, the location at which Stanley's type specimen was obtained.

This is a highly territorial bird which will chase off not only others of the same species, but also shrikes, doves and rollers. The territory may be up to three hectares (7.4 acres) in size, and hold 100 tall trees. It is surveyed from a treetop by its owner, who sings from before dawn intermittently until after midday.

== Taxonomy ==
The holotype of Alaudo chelicuti Stanley (Salt's Voyage to Abyssinia, 1814, App. IV. p.lvi. (=56)) is held in the vertebrate zoology collection of National Museums Liverpool at World Museum, with accession number NML-VZ D2304b. The specimen was collected in Abyssinia = Ethiopia in 1809/10 by Henry Salt. The specimen came to the Liverpool national collection via the 13th Earl of Derby's collection which was bequeathed to the people of Liverpool in 1851.

== Range and habitat ==
This species occurs in Sub-Saharan Africa except in dense forests (especially near the Congo River), the Horn of Africa, the Namib Desert and South Africa. It prefers woodland, thorn scrub (thornveld), dry bush, and open savanna, but avoids intensively farmed land.

There are two subspecies: H. c. chelicuti in most of the range, and H. c. eremogiton (Hartert, 1921) in the northern desert parts of the range from central Mali to the White Nile region of eastern Sudan. They hybridize in southern Mali.

== Description ==
The striped kingfisher of the nominate subspecies H. c. chelicuti averages 16 to 18 cm (about 6.5 in) from beak to tail. Perched adults look mostly greyish brown on the upper part of the body. The lower back, secondary flight feathers, and tail are metallic blue; this colour is much more visible when the bird flies than when it is perched, as is a white patch at the base of the primary flight feathers. The wing linings are white with a black border, and in males a black bar at the base of the primaries. The underparts are off-white, buffier on the breast, with brown streaks on the sides in Kenyan birds and also on the breast in southern African birds. Also streaked dark brown is the top of the head, with the background buffy grey in males and brownish in females. The sides of the head, throat, and a collar around the back of the neck continue the off-white of the underparts. A black line goes around the back of the neck, above the white collar, and through the eyes. The bill is blackish above and at the tip, otherwise reddish-orange below.

The juvenile resembles the adult but is paler. It has less blue on the wings, a darker crown, dusky tips to the breast feathers, and dull red on the lower mandible.

The call is distinctive, "a high-pitched, piercing 'cheer-cherrrrrr'" or a far-carrying "KEW, kerrrrrrrrr" in which the rs represent a repeated descending trill lower in pitch than the first note. It is often given at dusk in a display where the bird opens its wings.

The northern subspecies H. c. eremogiton has a grey-brown crown and mantle and almost unstreaked underparts.

== Food ==
The striped kingfisher eats mostly grasshoppers followed by other large insects. Small lizards, snakes and rodents are occasionally taken. It hunts from a perch about 3 metres (10 ft) high swooping to the ground for prey up to ten times a minute. Food items are taken back to the perch and swallowed, large prey being beaten vigorously first.

Grasshoppers taken to the nest to feed the young are presented to the chicks head-first, in much the same way that aquatic kingfishers deliver fish to their offspring.

== Reproduction ==
A mated pair of striped kingfishers display by sitting facing each other in a treetop with tail cocked. The wings are flicked open and shut as the birds sing. the pee-hee song soon becomes a sequence of short trills and pauses.

The female lays eggs in a disused woodpecker or barbet hole. Both sexes incubate during the day, but only the female at night. The male feeds the female, but holds the prey items while the female tears off pieces. Lesser honeyguides and greater honeyguides parasitise up to a quarter of nests.

This species is usually monogamous, but polyandry has been recorded. The striped kingfisher is normally double-brooded.

== Status ==
The striped kingfisher has a large range, estimated at 13 million square kilometres (5 million square miles), and is believed to have a large population. The species is not considered to be approaching the IUCN Red List population criterion of declining more than 30% in ten years or three generations, and is therefore evaluated as Least Concern.
