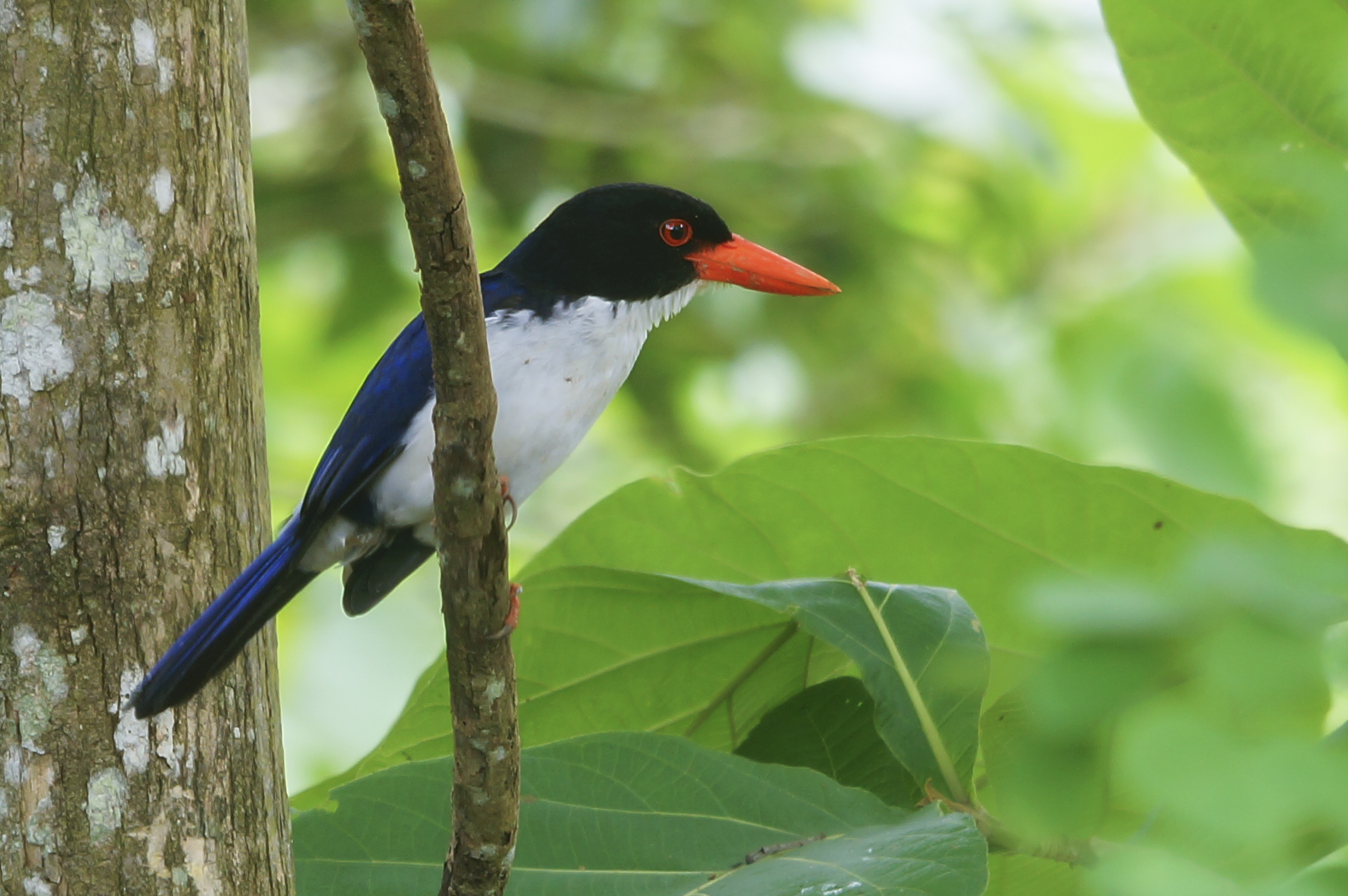

Conservation status
- Least Concern (IUCN 3.1)

Scientific classification
- Kingdom: Animalia
- Phylum: Chordata
- Class: Aves
- Order: Coraciiformes
- Family: Alcedinidae
- Subfamily: Halcyoninae
- Genus: Caridonax; Cabanis & Heine, 1860
- Species: C. fulgidus

Binomial name
- Caridonax fulgidus (Gould, 1857)

= White-rumped kingfisher =

Species of bird

The white-rumped kingfisher or glittering kingfisher (Caridonax fulgidus) is a species of bird in the family Alcedinidae. It is monotypic within the genus Caridonax. It is endemic to Indonesia, where its natural habitats are subtropical or tropical moist lowland forest and subtropical or tropical moist montane forest.

== Description ==
It is dark blue all over, except its underside and rump, which are white. It has a red bill and feet. Its eyes are dark brown.
