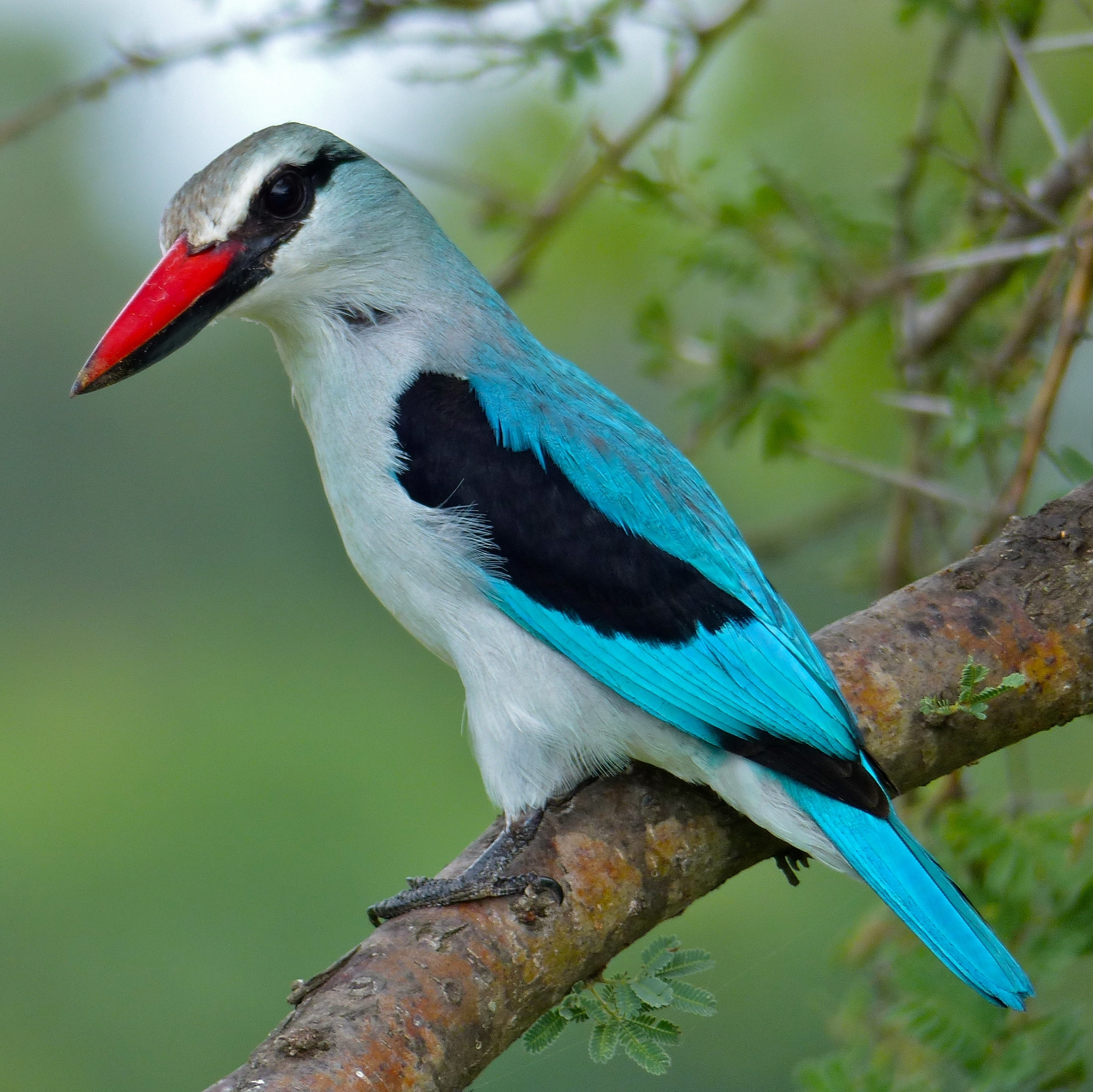
- Woodland kingfisher (Halcyon senegalensis)

Scientific classification
- Kingdom: Animalia
- Phylum: Chordata
- Class: Aves
- Order: Coraciiformes
- Family: Alcedinidae
- Subfamily: Halcyoninae
- Genus: Halcyon; Swainson, 1821

Type species
- Alcedo senegalensis Linnaeus, 1766

Species
- See text

= Halcyon (genus) =

Genus of birds

Halcyon (/ˈhælsiən/) is a genus of the tree kingfishers, birds in the subfamily Halcyoninae.

== Taxonomy ==
The genus Halcyon was introduced by the English naturalist and artist William Swainson in 1821. He named the type species as the woodland kingfisher (Halcyon senegalensis).

"Halcyon" is a name for a bird in Greek legend generally associated with the kingfisher. There was an ancient belief that the bird nested on the sea, which it calmed in order to lay its eggs on a floating nest. Two weeks of calm weather were therefore expected around the winter solstice. This myth leads to the use of halcyon as a term for peace or calmness.

The genus contains 12 species:

Image	Scientific name	Common name	Distribution
	Halcyon coromanda	Ruddy kingfisher	east and southeast Asia.
	Halcyon smyrnensis	White-throated kingfisher	from the Sinai east through the Indian subcontinent to China and Taiwan.
	Halcyon gularis	Brown-breasted kingfisher	the Philippines
	Halcyon cyanoventris	Javan kingfisher	Java and Bali
	Halcyon badia	Chocolate-backed kingfisher	western Sub-Saharan Africa.
	Halcyon pileata	Black-capped kingfisher	India east to China, Korea and Southeast Asia
	Halcyon leucocephala	Grey-headed kingfisher	Cape Verde Islands off the north-west coast of Africa to Mauritania, Senegal and Gambia, east to Ethiopia, Somalia and southern Arabia and south to South Africa.
	Halcyon albiventris	Brown-hooded kingfisher	Sub-Saharan Africa
	Halcyon chelicuti	Striped kingfisher	Sub-Saharan Africa
	Halcyon malimbica	Blue-breasted kingfisher	Equatorial Africa
	Halcyon senegalensis	Woodland kingfisher	Africa south of the Sahara.
	Halcyon senegaloides	Mangrove kingfisher	Somalia, south through Kenya, Tanzania and Mozambique, to South Africa

However, other sources, including Fry & Fry, lump the genera Pelargopsis, Syma and Todirhamphus into Halcyon to make a much larger grouping.

== Geographic distribution ==
The genus Halcyon in the current sense consists mainly of species resident in sub-Saharan Africa, with a couple of representatives in southern Asia, one of which, the white-throated kingfisher, occasionally reaches Europe. White-throated and ruddy kingfishers are at least partially migratory.

== Habitat ==
Halcyon kingfishers are mostly large birds with heavy bills. They occur in a variety of habitats, with woodland of various types the preferred environment for most. They are "sit and wait" predators of small ground animals including large insects, rodents, snakes, and frogs, but some will also take fish.

== Sources ==
- Fry, K & Fry, H.C. (2000): Kingfishers, Bee-eaters and Rollers. ISBN 0-691-08780-6.
