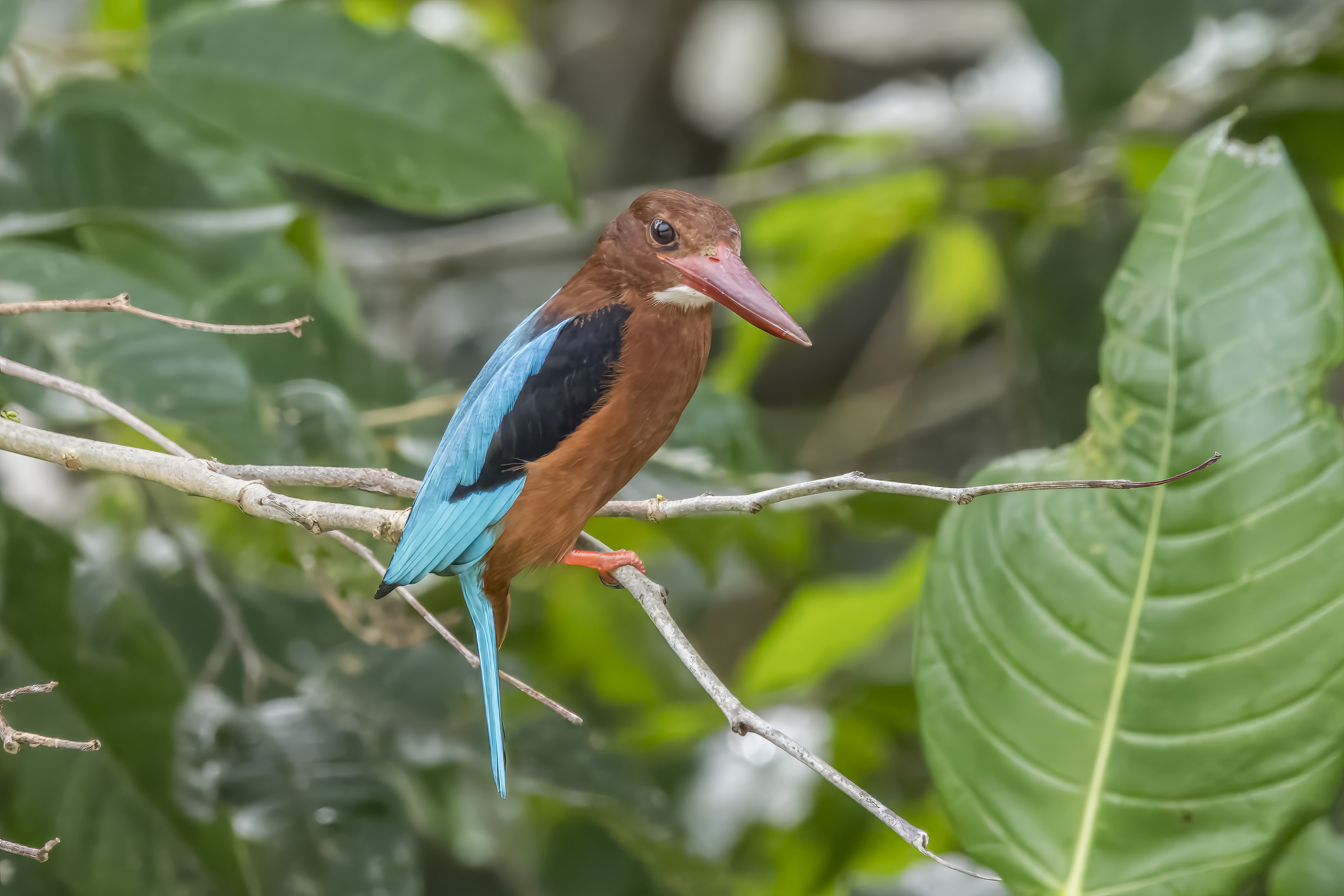

Conservation status
- Least Concern (IUCN 3.1)

Scientific classification
- Kingdom: Animalia
- Phylum: Chordata
- Class: Aves
- Order: Coraciiformes
- Family: Alcedinidae
- Subfamily: Halcyoninae
- Genus: Halcyon
- Species: H. gularis

Binomial name
- Halcyon gularis (Kuhl, 1820)

Synonyms
- Halcyon smyrnensis gularis

= Brown-breasted kingfisher =

Species of bird from Asia

The brown-breasted kingfisher (Halcyon gularis) is a tree kingfisher endemic to the Philippines, where it is widely distributed. This kingfisher is a resident over much of its range.

== Description and taxonomy ==
It was previously considered a subspecies of the white-throated kingfisher (H. smyrnensis), but was split as a distinct species by the IUCN Red List and BirdLife International in 2014, and the International Ornithological Congress followed suit in 2022.

It is differentiated by its plummage white a smaller extent of white which is restricted to the chin versus the white-throated kingfishers which white spot includes the breast, a larger white wingpatch, more black on the wings and a shorter tail.

This species is monotypic.

== Ecology and behavior ==
Feeds on insects, reptiles, amphibians, fish, small birds and mammals and even the occasional bat. Typically perches 5 to 10 meters above its hunting area and swoops down to its prey.

Season is around April to May where it typically nests in termite mounds and lays 2 to 4 eggs.

== Habitat and conservation status ==
Has a wide range of habitats that include clearings, fishponds, rivers, second growth scrubland, and forest edge. Typically found below 1,000 meters above sea level.

The IUCN has yet to classify this species as separate from white-throated kingfisher. This species is common all throughout and has well adapted and even benefited fromohuman modified habitats. While the Philippines has faced massive deforestation, this species adaptability has allowed it to survive and even thrive better than most Philippine birds.
