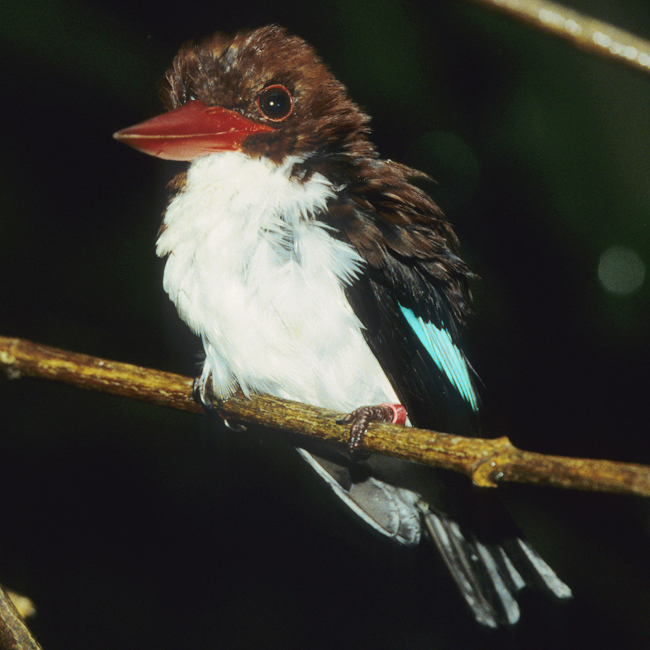

Conservation status
- Least Concern (IUCN 3.1)

Scientific classification
- Kingdom: Animalia
- Phylum: Chordata
- Class: Aves
- Order: Coraciiformes
- Family: Alcedinidae
- Subfamily: Halcyoninae
- Genus: Halcyon
- Species: H. badia

Binomial name
- Halcyon badia Verreaux & Verreaux, 1851

= Chocolate-backed kingfisher =

Species of bird

The chocolate-backed kingfisher (Halcyon badia) is a species of kingfisher in the subfamily Halcyoninae, native to the African tropical rainforest.

== Description ==
The chocolate-backed kingfisher has the typical stocky kingfisher shape with dark upper parts and pure white underparts. The head and hind neck are very dark brown, the mantle is brownish black, the back is black, the rump a brilliant iridescent blue, the upper tail coverts are black, and the tail is pale blue. The wings are dark, apart from a brilliant azure speculum formed in the outer webs of the secondary feathers. The underparts from the throat to the vent are snowy white, apart from a small blackish flank patch, and are clearly demarcated from the dark upper parts. In flight the brilliant blue rump and speculum are distinctive. The bill is red or reddish brown. Juveniles are similar to adults, except that the breast is scalloped and the bill is blackish with an orange tip.

== Voice ==
A harsh screeching alarm note is given. The song is a high pitched, barely audible introductory "pee" followed by 12-17 long flutelike pure tones which are evenly spaced and far carrying, lasting 5–7 seconds, and sometimes falling away toward the last few notes.

== Distribution ==
The chocolate-backed kingfisher occurs across the African tropical rainforest : west of the Dahomey Gap from Sierra Leone to Ghana, then from southern Nigeria east to southern Central African Republic and western Uganda, south to the Kwango River in northern Angola. It is also found on Bioko.

== Habitat ==
The chocolate-backed kingfisher is not associated with water and is a bird of primary and secondary lowland rain forest.

== Habits ==
The chocolate-backed kingfisher spends much of its time perched quietly quite high up in trees that overlook a clearing. It flies out from this perch to catch prey in the air or drops from the perch onto prey on the ground. It has been recorded attacking columns of driver ants and feeding on either the driver ants themselves or the insects their columns flush. They feed on insects, mainly grasshoppers and beetles, but also many other invertebrates as well as small lizards.

They excavate their nests in the earth nests of the arboreal termites of the genus Nasutitermes. The termites fix their nests to a liana or vine or angled branch at about 4–5 m (13–16 ft) above the forest floor. The kingfishers excavate their nest horizontally from the side and can dig out most of the termite's structure; the termites react by sealing themselves off from the cavity created by the birds. They also sometimes use hanging ant nests.
