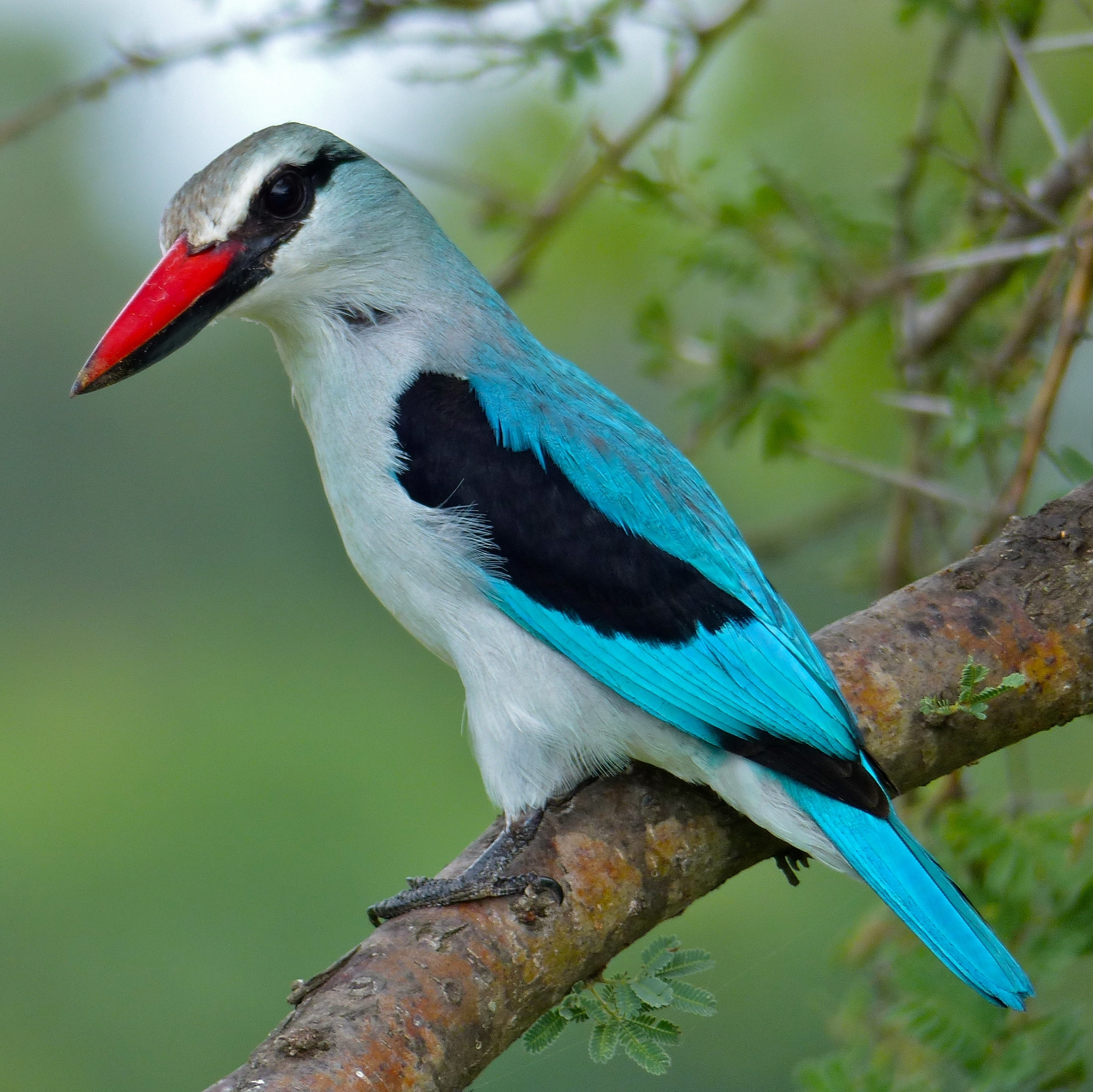
- Woodland kingfisher (Halcyon senegalensis)

Scientific classification
- Kingdom: Animalia
- Phylum: Chordata
- Class: Aves
- Order: Coraciiformes
- Family: Alcedinidae
- Subfamily: Halcyoninae; Vigors, 1825

Genera
- Actenoides; Caridonax; Cittura; Halcyon; Lacedo; Melidora; Pelargopsis; Tanysiptera; Dacelo; Syma; Todirhamphus

= Tree kingfisher =

Subfamily of birds

Phylogeny of Halcyoninae

- Halcyoninae
  - - Lacedo
    - - Pelargopsis
      - Halcyon
  - - - Cittura
      - Tanysiptera
    - - - - Melidora
          - Dacelo
        - Actenoides
      - - Syma
        - Todiramphus

Cladogram based on the molecular analysis by Andersen and colleagues published in 2017. Dacelo and Actenoides are paraphyletic. The shovel-billed kookaburra in the monotypic genus Clytoceyx sits within Dacelo; the glittering kingfisher in the monotypic genus Caridonax is within Actenoides.

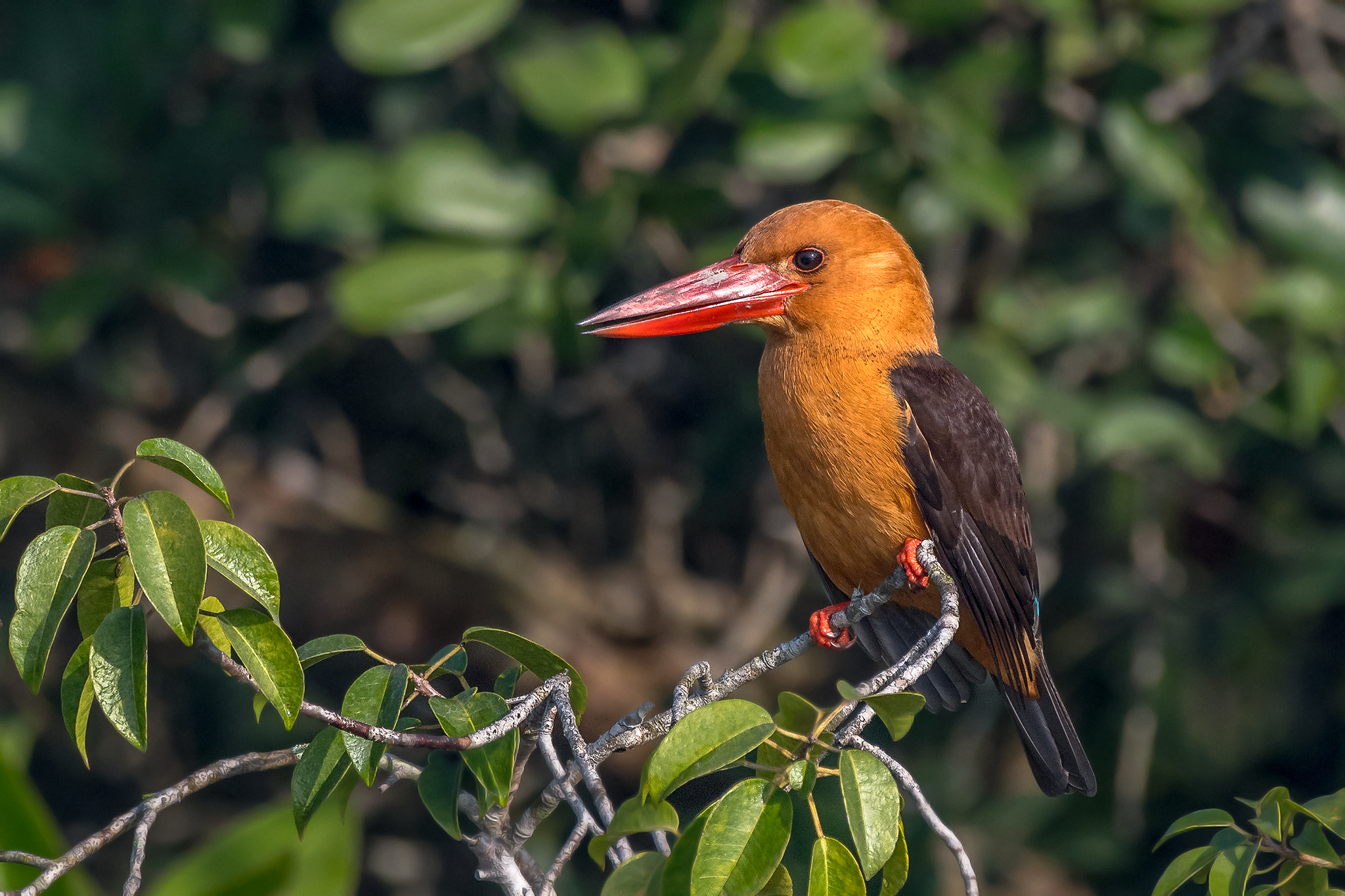
Brown-winged kingfisher, Sundarbans, West Bengal, India

The tree kingfishers, also called wood kingfishers or Halcyoninae, are the most numerous of the three subfamilies of birds in the kingfisher family, with 72 species divided into 11 genera, including several species of kookaburras. The subfamily appears to have arisen in Indochina and Maritime Southeast Asia and then spread to many areas around the world. Tree kingfishers are widespread through Asia and Australasia, but also appear in Africa and the islands of the Pacific and Indian Oceans, using a range of habitats from tropical rainforest to open woodlands.

The tree kingfishers are short-tailed, large-headed, compact birds with long, pointed bills. Like other Coraciiformes, they are brightly coloured. Most are monogamous and territorial, nesting in holes in trees or termite nests. Both parents incubate the eggs and feed the chicks. Although some tree kingfishers frequent wetlands, none are specialist fish-eaters. Most species dive onto prey from a perch, mainly taking slow-moving invertebrates or small vertebrates.

== Taxonomy ==
The tree kingfisher subfamily is often given the name Daceloninae introduce by Charles Lucien Bonaparte in 1841, but the name Halcyoninae introduced by Nicholas Aylward Vigors in 1825 is earlier and has priority.

The subfamily Halcyoninae is one of three subfamilies in the kingfisher family Alcedinidae. The other two are Alcedininae and Cerylinae. The subfamily contains around 70 species divided into 12 genera. A molecular study published in 2017 found that the genera Dacelo and Actenoides as currently defined are paraphyletic. The shovel-billed kookaburra in the monotypic genus Clytoceyx sits within Dacelo and the glittering kingfisher in the monotypic genus Caridonax lies within Actenoides.

=== List of species ===
- Genus Actenoides

- Green-backed kingfisher, Actenoides monachus
- Scaly-breasted kingfisher, Actenoides princeps
- Moustached kingfisher, Actenoides bougainvillei
- Spotted wood kingfisher, Actenoides lindsayi
- Blue-capped kingfisher, Actenoides hombroni
- Rufous-collared kingfisher, Actenoides concretus

- Genus Melidora

- Hook-billed kingfisher, Melidora macrorrhina

- Genus Lacedo

- Banded kingfisher, Lacedo pulchella

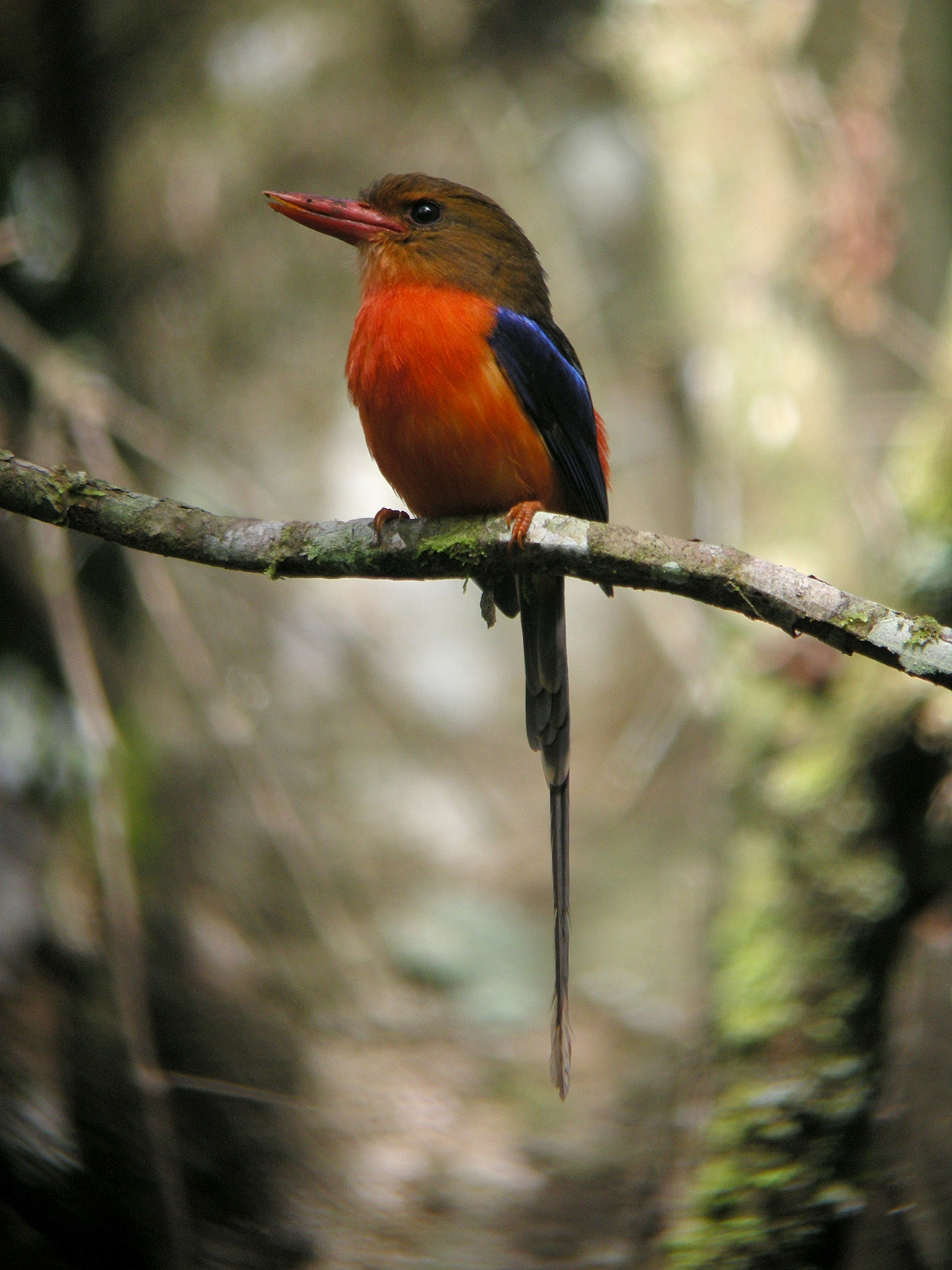
Brown-headed paradise kingfisher

- Genus Tanysiptera, paradise kingfishers

- Common paradise kingfisher, Tanysiptera galatea
- Kofiau paradise kingfisher, Tanysiptera ellioti
- Biak paradise kingfisher, Tanysiptera riedelii
- Numfor paradise kingfisher, Tanysiptera carolinae
- Little paradise kingfisher, Tanysiptera hydrocharis
- Buff-breasted paradise kingfisher, Tanysiptera sylvia
- Black-capped paradise kingfisher, Tanysiptera nigriceps
- Red-breasted paradise kingfisher, Tanysiptera nympha
- Brown-headed paradise kingfisher, Tanysiptera danae

- Genus Cittura

- Sulawesi lilac kingfisher, Cittura cyanotis
- Sangihe lilac kingfisher, Cittura sanghirensis

- Genus Dacelo, kookaburras

- Laughing kookaburra, Dacelo novaeguineae
- Blue-winged kookaburra, Dacelo leachii
- Spangled kookaburra, Dacelo tyro
- Shovel-billed kookaburra, Dacelo rex
- Rufous-bellied kookaburra, Dacelo gaudichaud

- Genus Caridonax

- White-rumped kingfisher, Caridonax fulgidus

- Genus Pelargopsis

- Stork-billed kingfisher, Pelargopsis capensis
- Great-billed kingfisher, Pelargopsis melanorhyncha
- Brown-winged kingfisher, Pelargopsis amauroptera

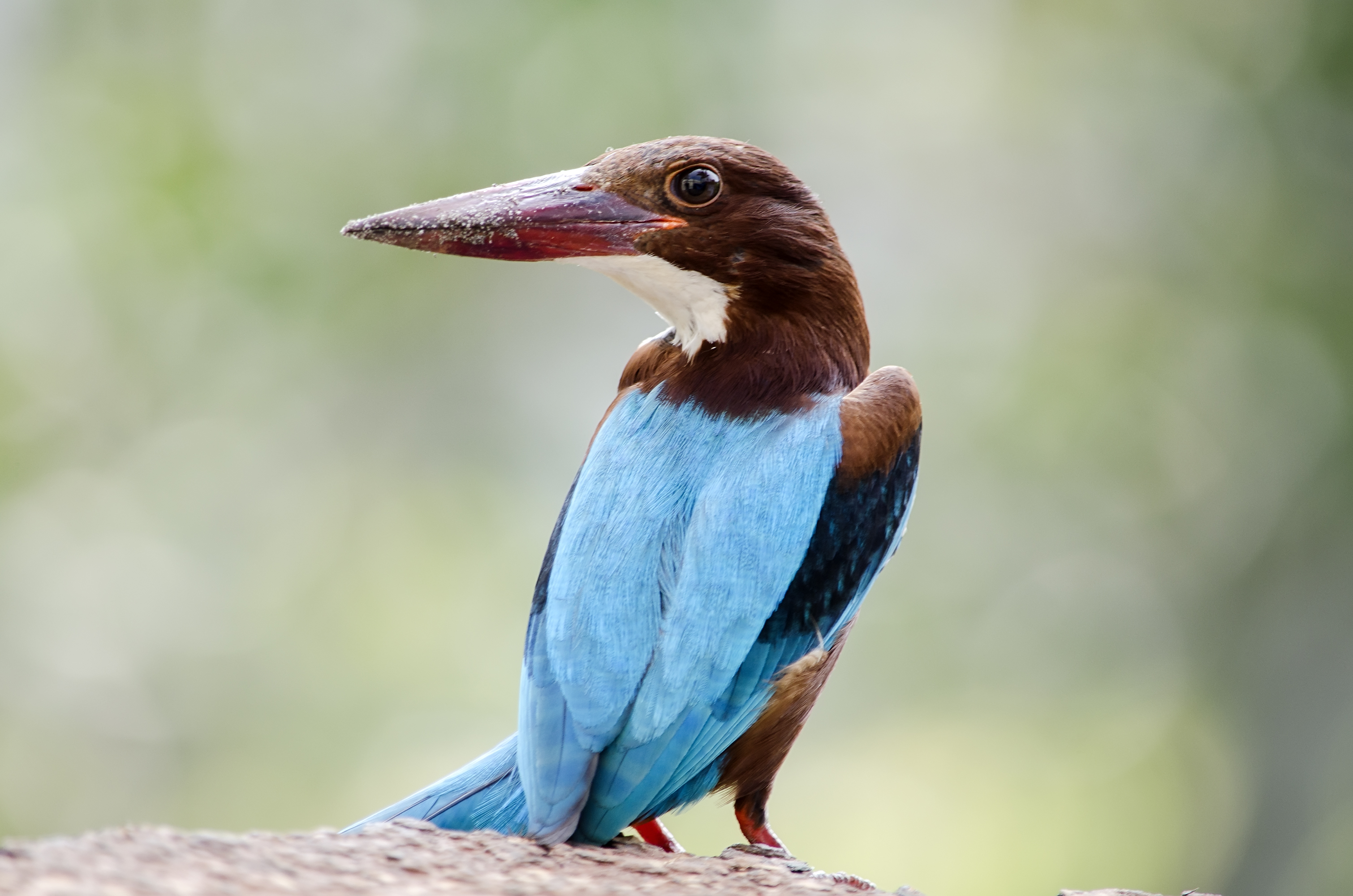
White-throated kingfisher

- Genus Halcyon

- Ruddy kingfisher, Halcyon coromanda
- White-throated kingfisher, Halcyon smyrnensis
- Brown-breasted kingfisher, Halcyon gularis
- Javan kingfisher, Halcyon cyanoventris
- Chocolate-backed kingfisher, Halcyon badia
- Black-capped kingfisher, Halcyon pileata
- Grey-headed kingfisher, Halcyon leucocephala
- Brown-hooded kingfisher, Halcyon albiventris
- Striped kingfisher, Halcyon chelicuti
- Blue-breasted kingfisher, Halcyon malimbica
- Woodland kingfisher, Halcyon senegalensis
- Mangrove kingfisher, Halcyon senegaloides

- Genus Todirhamphus

- Blue-black kingfisher, Todirhamphus nigrocyaneus
- Rufous-lored kingfisher, Todirhamphus winchelli
- Blue-and-white kingfisher, Todirhamphus diops
- Lazuli kingfisher, Todirhamphus lazuli
- Forest kingfisher, Todirhamphus macleayii
- White-mantled kingfisher, Todirhamphus albonotatus
- Ultramarine kingfisher, Todirhamphus leucopygius
- Vanuatu kingfisher, Todirhamphus farquhari
- Sombre kingfisher, Todirhamphus funebris
- Collared kingfisher, Todirhamphus chloris
- Torresian kingfisher, Todirhamphus sordidus
- Islet kingfisher, Todirhamphus colonus
- Mariana kingfisher, Todirhamphus albicilla
- Melanesian kingfisher, Todirhamphus tristrami
- Pacific kingfisher, Todirhamphus sacer
- Talaud kingfisher, Todirhamphus enigma
- Guam kingfisher, Todirhamphus cinnamominus
- Rusty-capped kingfisher, Todiramphus pelewensis
- Pohnpei kingfisher, Todiramphus reichenbachii
- Beach kingfisher, Todirhamphus saurophaga
- Sacred kingfisher, Todirhamphus sanctus
- Flat-billed kingfisher, Todirhamphus recurvirostris
- Cinnamon-banded kingfisher, Todirhamphus australasia
- Chattering kingfisher, Todirhamphus tuta
- Mewing kingfisher, Todirhamphus ruficollaris
- Society kingfisher, Todirhamphus veneratus
- Mangareva kingfisher, Todirhamphus gambieri
- Niau kingfisher, Todirhamphus gertrudae
- Marquesan kingfisher, Todirhamphus godeffroyi
- Red-backed kingfisher, Todirhamphus pyrrhopygia

- Genus Syma

- Yellow-billed kingfisher, Syma torotoro
- Mountain kingfisher, Syma megarhyncha

== Description ==
Kingfishers are short-tailed, large-headed, compact birds with long, pointed bills. Like other Coraciiformes, they are brightly coloured. The tree kingfishers are medium to large species, mostly typical kingfishers in appearance, although shovel-billed kookaburra has a huge conical bill, and the Tanysiptera paradise kingfishers have long tail streamers. Some species, notably the kookaburras, show sexual dimorphism.

== Distribution and habitat ==
Most tree kingfishers are found in the warm climates of Africa, southern and southeast Asia, and Australasia. No members of this family are found in the Americas. The origin of the family is thought to have been in tropical Australasia, which still has the most species.

Tree kingfishers use a range of habitats from tropical rainforest to open woodlands and thornbush country. Many are not closely tied to water, and can be found in arid areas of Australia and Africa.

=== Breeding ===
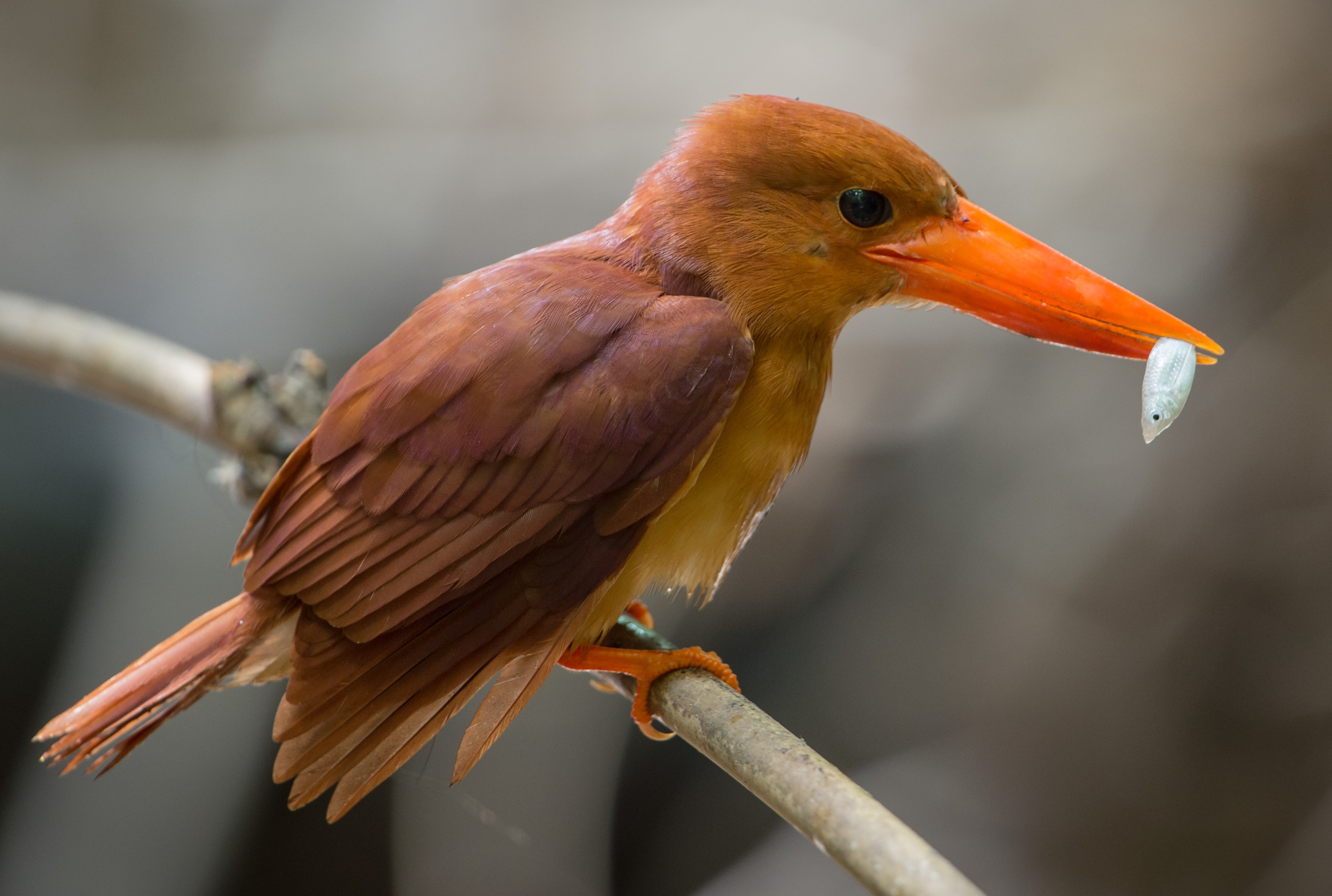
Ruddy kingfisher

Tree kingfishers are monogamous and territorial, although some species, including three kookaburras, have a cooperative breeding system involving young from earlier broods. The nest is a tree hole, either natural, and old woodpecker nest, or excavated in soft or rotting wood by the kingfishers. Several species dig holes in termite nests. No nest material is added, although litter may build up over the years. Both parents incubate the eggs and feed the chicks. Egg laying is staggered at one-day intervals so that if food is short, only the older, larger nestlings get fed. The chicks are naked, blind, and helpless when they hatch, and stand on their heels, unlike adults.

=== Feeding ===
Although some tree kingfishers, such as the black-capped kingfisher, frequent wetlands, none are specialist fishers. Most species are watch-and-wait hunters which dive onto prey from a perch, mainly taking slow-moving invertebrates or small vertebrates. The shovel-billed kookaburra digs through leaf litter for worms and other prey, and the Vanuatu kingfisher feeds exclusively on insects and spiders. Several other western Pacific species are also mainly insectivorous and flycatch for prey. As with the other kingfisher families, insectivorous species tend to have flattened, red bills to assist in the capture of insects.

== Sources ==
- Fry, C. Hilary; Fry, Kathie; Harris, Alan (1992). Kingfishers, Bee-eaters, and Rollers. London: Christopher Helm. ISBN 978-0-7136-8028-7.
