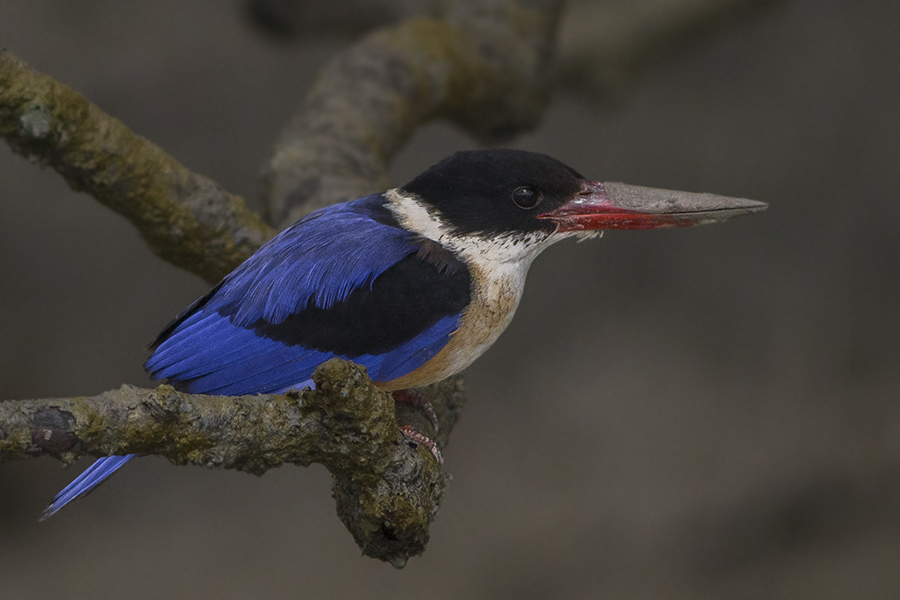
- Adult at Sundarban, West Bengal, India.

Conservation status
- Vulnerable (IUCN 3.1)

Scientific classification
- Kingdom: Animalia
- Phylum: Chordata
- Class: Aves
- Order: Coraciiformes
- Family: Alcedinidae
- Subfamily: Halcyoninae
- Genus: Halcyon
- Species: H. pileata

Binomial name
- Halcyon pileata (Boddaert, 1783)

= Black-capped kingfisher =

Species of bird

The black-capped kingfisher (Halcyon pileata) is a tree kingfisher which is widely distributed in tropical Asia from India east to China, Korea and Southeast Asia. This most northerly of the tree kingfishers is resident over much of its range, but northern populations are migratory, wintering south of their range in Sri Lanka, Thailand, Borneo and Java. It is distinctive in having a black cap that contrasts with the whitish throat, purple-blue wings and the coral red bill. The species is mainly found in coastal and mangrove habitats but can sometimes be found far inland.

== Taxonomy ==
The black-capped kingfisher was described by the French polymath Georges-Louis Leclerc, Comte de Buffon in his Histoire Naturelle des Oiseaux in 1780. The bird was also illustrated in a hand-coloured plate engraved by François-Nicolas Martinet in the Planches Enluminées D'Histoire Naturelle, which was produced under the supervision of Edme-Louis Daubenton to accompany Buffon's text. Neither the plate caption nor Buffon's description included a scientific name, but in 1783 the Dutch naturalist Pieter Boddaert coined the binomial name Alcedo pileata in his catalogue of the Planches Enluminées. The type locality is China. The present genus Halcyon was introduced by the English naturalist and artist William Swainson in 1821. Halcyon is a name for a bird in Greek mythology generally associated with the kingfisher. The specific epithet pileata is from the Latin pileatus meaning '-capped'. The species is monotypic.

== Description ==
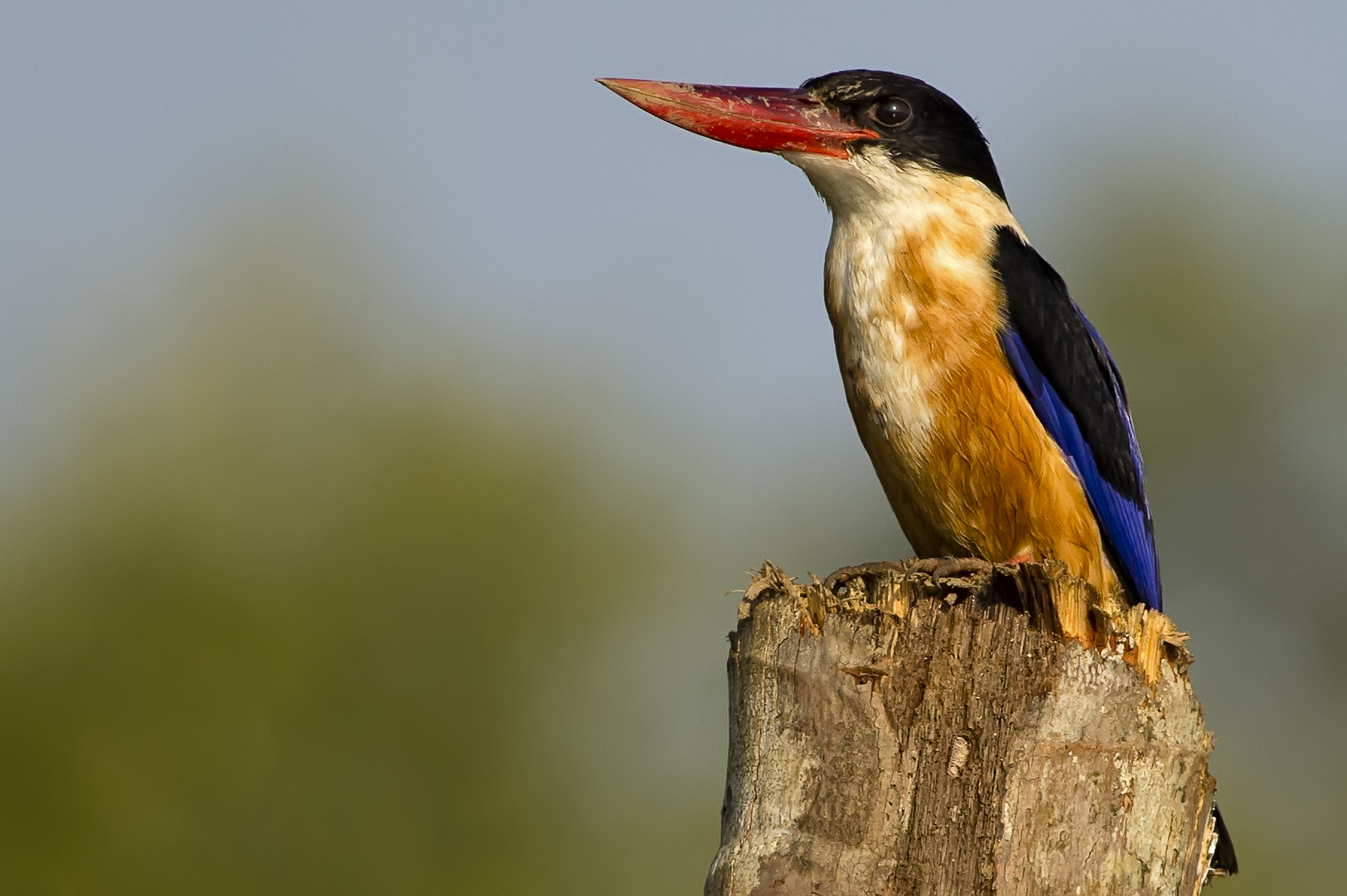
Adult along the Zuari River

This kingfisher is about 28 centimetres (11 in) long. The adult has purple-blue wings and back, black head and shoulders, white neck collar and throat, and rufous underparts. The large bill and legs are bright red. In flight, large white patches or "mirrors" at the base of the primaries are visible on the blue and black wings. Sexes are similar, but juveniles are a duller version of the adult and show streaks on the throat. The call of this kingfisher is a cackling ki-ki-ki-ki-ki.

Usually seen on coastal waters and especially in mangroves, it is easily disturbed. It perches conspicuously and dives to catch fish, and also feeds on large insects. The flight of the black-capped kingfisher is rapid and direct, the short rounded wings whirring.

The breeding season is in summer. The nest is a tunnel in an earth bank. A single clutch of 4-5 round, white eggs is typical.

A subspecies palawanensis has been described, but the species is considered to be monotypic with no clear plumage differences across its range.

== Distribution and habitat ==
The species is found mainly near the coast in mangrove forests and along estuaries and rivers. The distribution ranges from India (including the Andaman and Nicobar Islands where they occur even on remote islands like Narcondam), Sri Lanka, Kansu, Shansi, Korea, Malay Peninsula, Thailand, Burma, Ryukyu Islands, Bangladesh, Hainan, Philippines (Palawan, Balabac, Basilan, Tawi Tawi), Borneo, Sumatra east to Sulawesi where it occurs only in winter. Vagrants in winter have been recorded in Pakistan, while movements related to rainfall may lead to their being found far inland and away from their usual distribution.

== In culture ==
Like many other kingfishers, this species was much sought for the blue feathers for use in the millinery trade. Feathers were used in making fans in China. In Hong Kong, their feathers were cut and glued over ornaments used by women.
