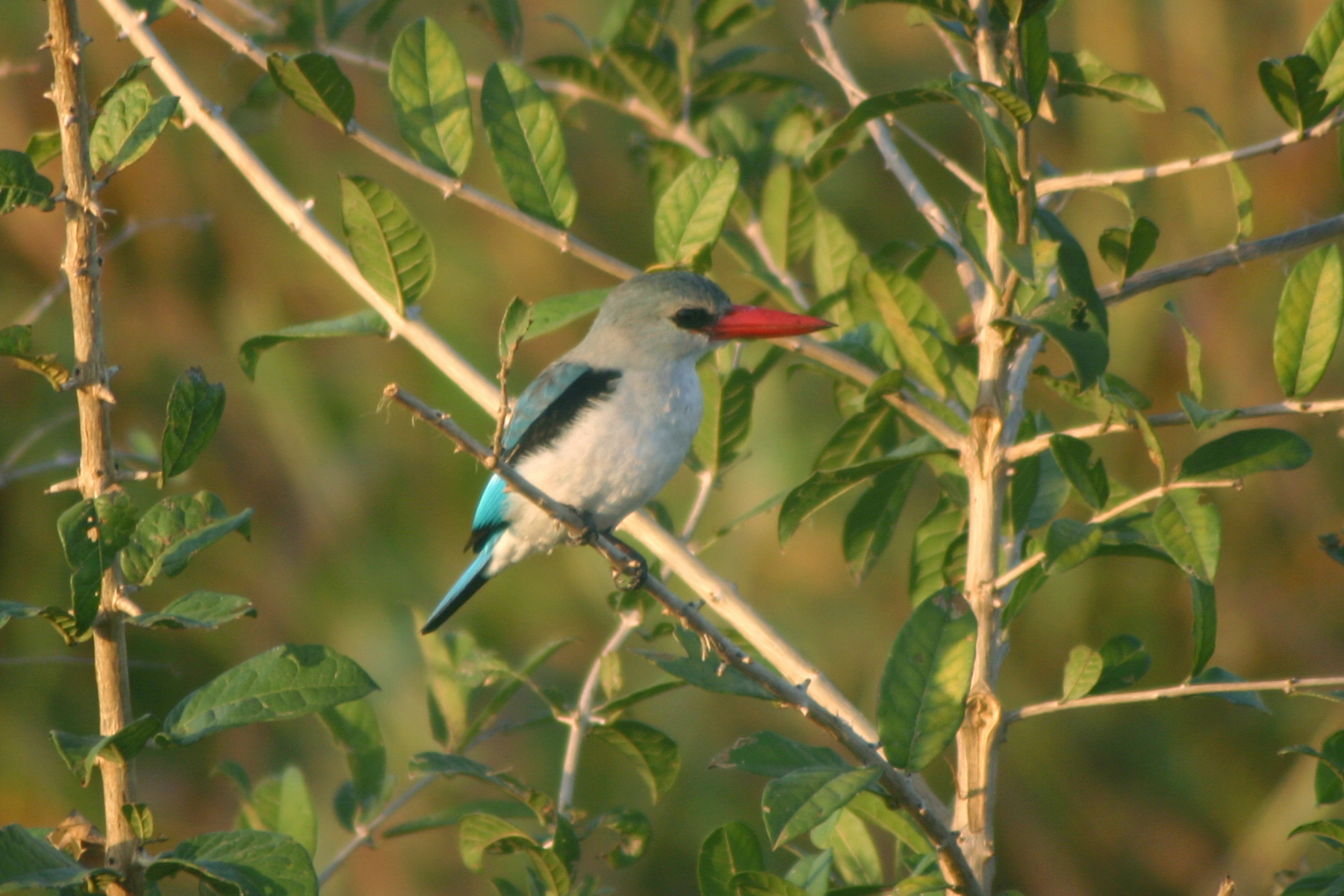
- In Saadani National Park, Tanzania

Conservation status
- Least Concern (IUCN 3.1)

Scientific classification
- Kingdom: Animalia
- Phylum: Chordata
- Class: Aves
- Order: Coraciiformes
- Family: Alcedinidae
- Subfamily: Halcyoninae
- Genus: Halcyon
- Species: H. senegaloides

Binomial name
- Halcyon senegaloides Smith, 1834

= Mangrove kingfisher =

Species of bird

The mangrove kingfisher (Halcyon senegaloides) is a kingfisher in the genus Halcyon. It is similar in appearance to the woodland kingfisher. It is found along the eastern coastline of Sub-Saharan Africa, living in woodland, along rivers, and in estuaries and mangrove. The International Union for Conservation of Nature (IUCN) has assessed it as being of least concern.

== Taxonomy ==
This species was described by Andrew Smith in 1834, using a specimen collected around Port Natal (now Durban). It is a close relative of the woodland kingfisher (Halcyon senegalensis). The mangrove kingfisher is a monotypic species. Northern populations are sometimes separated as subspecies ranivorus, but the differences do not appear to be large enough.

== Description ==
The mangrove kingfisher is about 22 cm (8.7 in) long. The male and female are alike. The head is dark grey-brown, with black lores and a narrow white line above the eye, and the cheeks and sides of the neck are brown-grey. The grey breast and flanks are vermiculated (having dense, irregular lines). There is a black patch under the wing. The rest of the plumage is similar to the woodland kingfisher, having black and blue covert and flight feathers. The beak of the mangrove kingfisher is red, the eyes are dark brown, and the legs are dark grey-brown. The juvenile bird is duller, has coarser vermiculations and a yellowish-buff wash on the breast, and has a brown beak. Birds in the south tend to have slightly longer wings and narrower beaks.

== Distribution and habitat ==
This species is found near the eastern coast of Africa, from Somalia, south through Kenya, Tanzania and Mozambique, to South Africa. One individual has been recorded in eastern Zambia. It usually occurs within 20 km (12 mi) of the coast, but is also found inland along the Jubba and Zambezi rivers. It is considered a partial migrant. When not breeding, it lives in estuaries and mangrove, and also wooded shores, thornveld, forest, cultivated land, parks and gardens. To breed, it leaves estuaries and mangrove, moving to woodland and wooded rivers; these are generally farther inland, an exception being that they breed in the Zanzibar Archipelago.

== Behaviour ==
This kingfisher catches fish and also eats crabs, prawns, lizards and insects. The song is a raucous, accelerating series of tchi notes, and the breeding display includes spreading the wings. Breeding has been recorded from October to January. Nests have been recorded in tree holes and termite nests.

== Status ==
The population appears to be declining because of habitat loss, but the decline is not rapid, and the species has a large range, so the IUCN has assessed it as a least-concern species. Juveniles sometimes collide with human structures while migrating.
