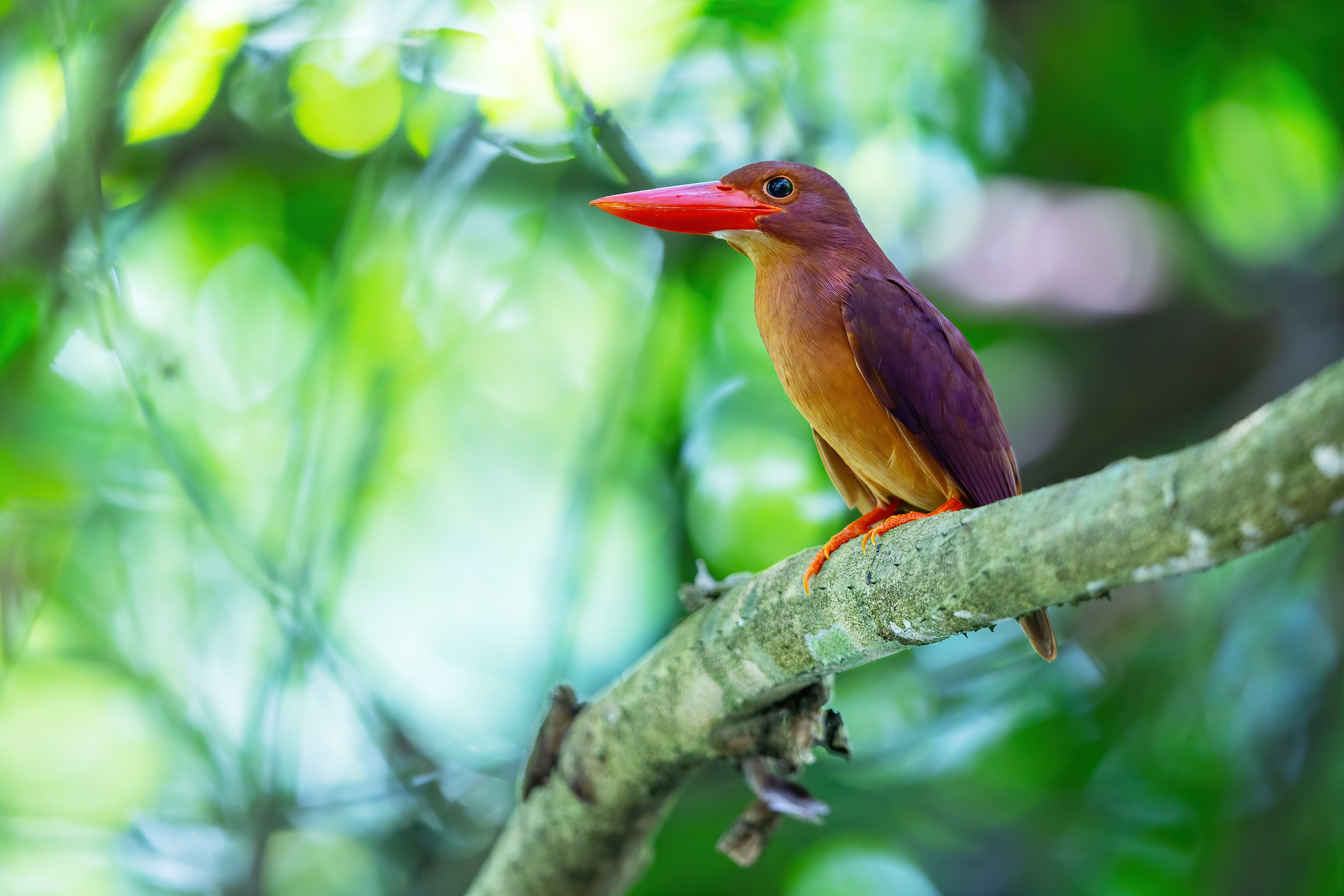
- Near Malang, Indonesia

Conservation status
- Least Concern (IUCN 3.1)

Scientific classification
- Kingdom: Animalia
- Phylum: Chordata
- Class: Aves
- Order: Coraciiformes
- Family: Alcedinidae
- Subfamily: Halcyoninae
- Genus: Halcyon
- Species: H. coromanda

Binomial name
- Halcyon coromanda (Latham, 1790)

= Ruddy kingfisher =

Species of bird

The ruddy kingfisher (Halcyon coromanda) is a medium-sized tree kingfisher, widely distributed in east and southeast Asia.

== Description ==
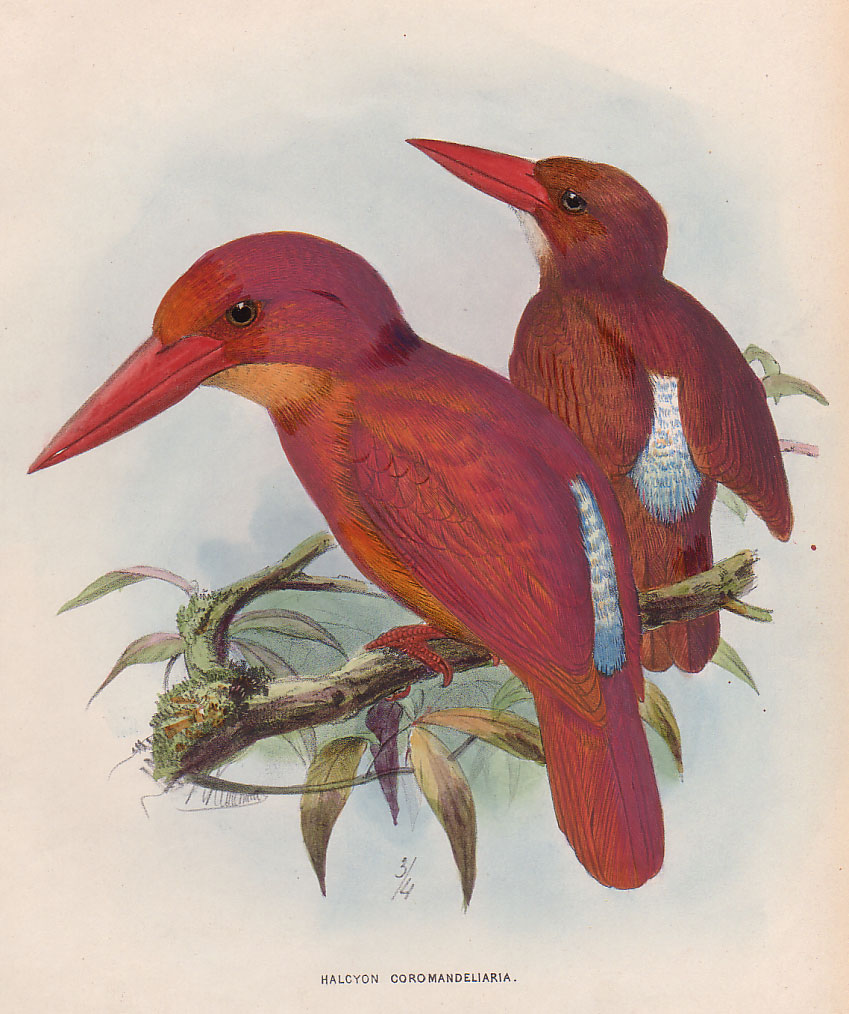
H. coromanda by John Gerrard Keulemans

Reaching approximately 25 cm, the ruddy kingfisher has a very large, bright red bill and equally red legs. The body is rust red, generally deepening to purple at the tail. There is little sexual dimorphism though some sources report male birds being somewhat brighter in plumage. Due to its preference for heavily forested areas, the kingfisher's high, descending call is more often heard than the bird itself is seen, and these birds generally travel singly or in pairs.

== Distribution and habitat ==
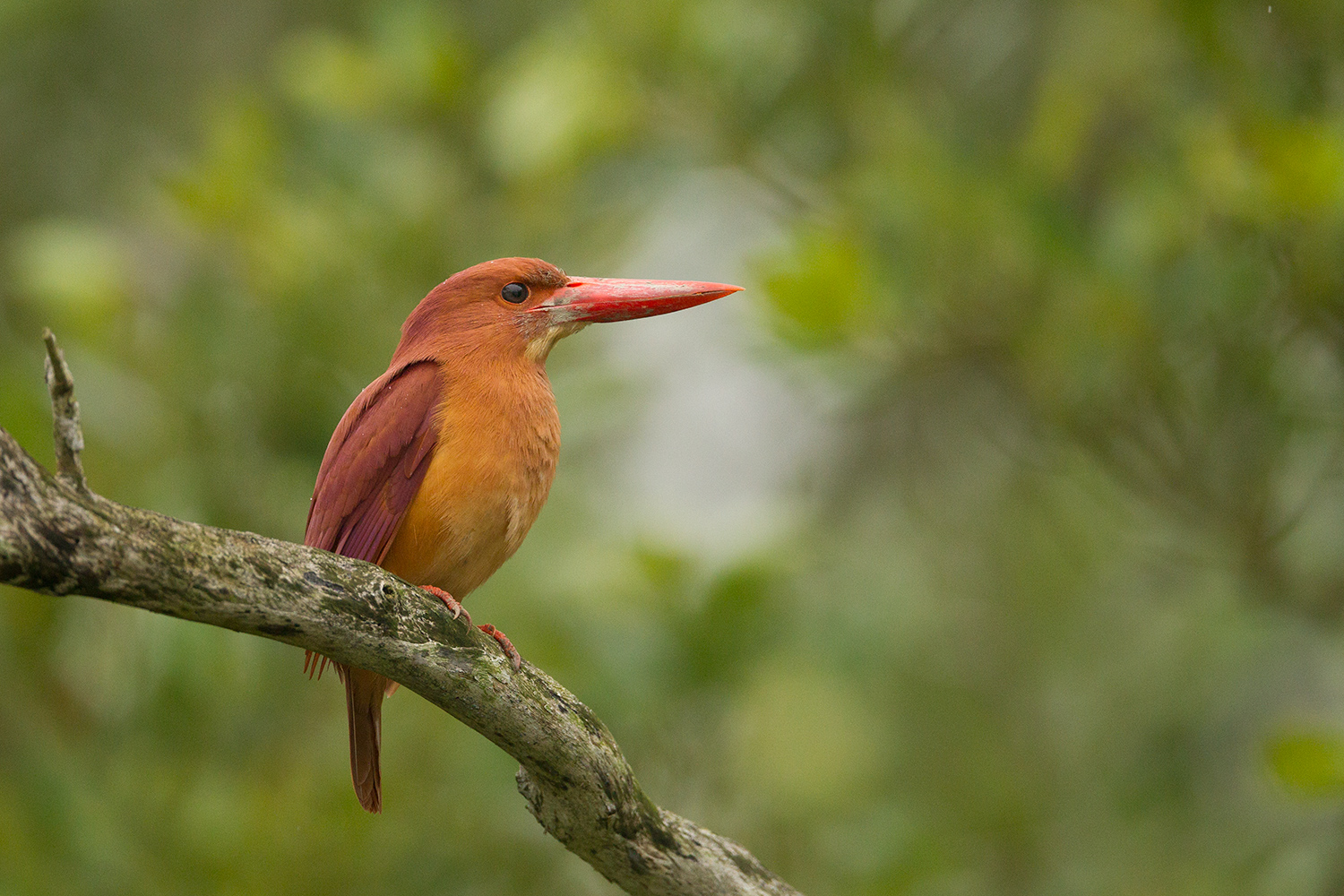
Ruddy kingfisher at Sunderban tiger reserve, India

The ruddy kingfisher ranges from South Korea and Japan in the north, south through the Philippines to the Sunda Islands, and west to China and India. It is migratory, with birds in the northern part of the range migrating as far south as Borneo during winter. Locally common in southern parts of its range, the ruddy kingfisher is rare in Japan, where it is highly sought after by birders. Ruddy kingfishers inhabit forested areas from the temperate to tropical zones, often in thick jungles and rainforests.

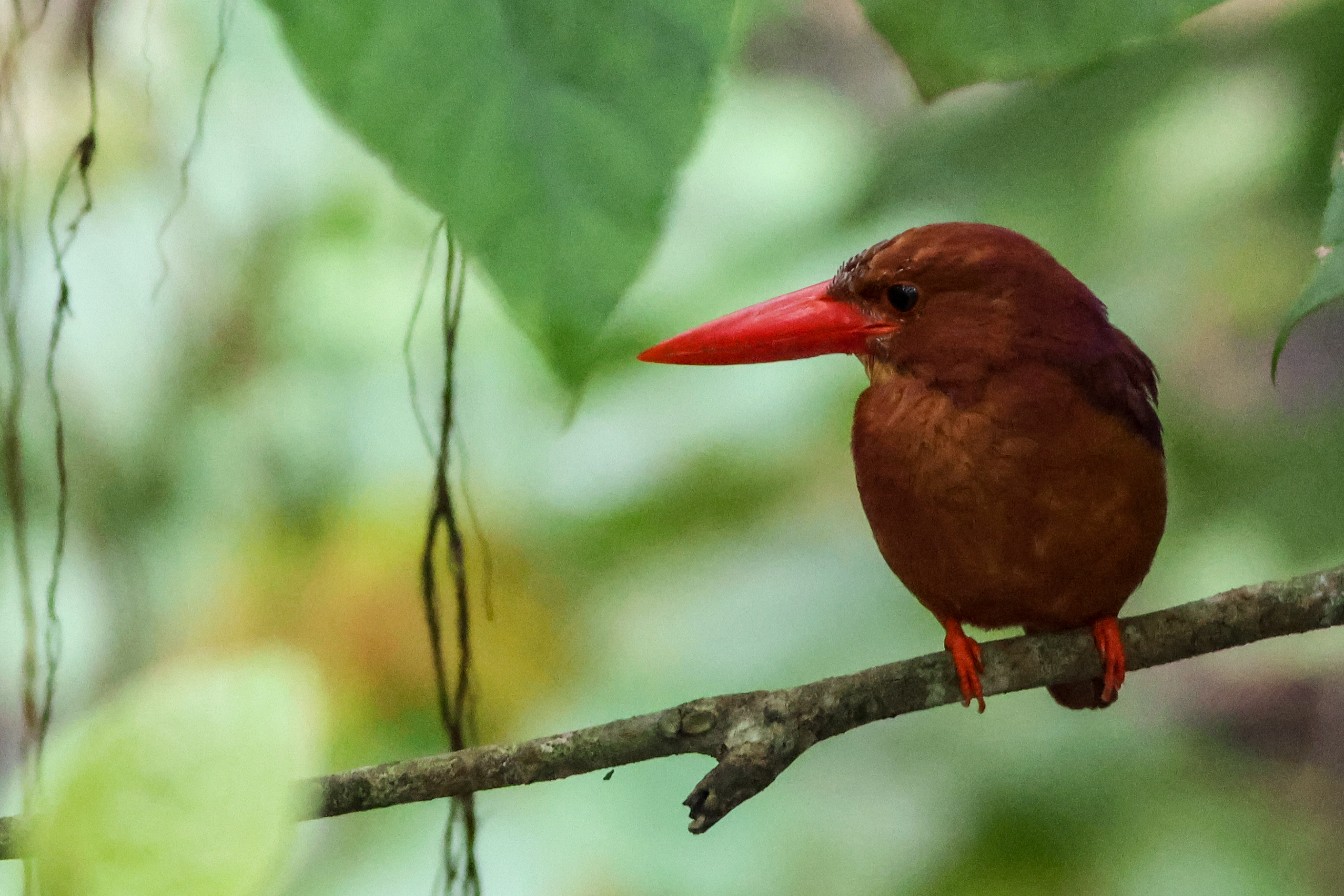
Ruddy Kingfisher from Sulawesi, Indonesia

The binomial name recalls the Coromandel Coast of India.

== Behaviour and ecology ==
=== Food and feeding ===
Like other kingfishers, ruddy kingfishers generally feed on fish, crustaceans, and large insects. However, in areas with less running water, they are known to eat frogs and other amphibians.

== Taxonomy ==
Halcyon coromanda includes the following subspecies:

- H. c. coromanda - (Latham, 1790)
- H. c. major - (Temminck & Schlegel, 1848)
- H. c. bangsi - (Oberholser, 1915)
- H. c. mizorhina - (Oberholser, 1915)
- H. c. minor - (Temminck & Schlegel, 1848)
- H. c. linae - Hubbard & duPont, 1974
- H. c. claudiae - Hubbard & duPont, 1974
- H. c. rufa - Wallace, 1863
- H. c. pelingensis - Neumann, 1939
- H. c. sulana - Mees, 1970

== Other sources ==
- Shimada, Tadashi (1985). Hi No Tori, Akashobin (Ruddy kingfisher). Heibonsha. ISBN 4-582-52915-1. - a photographic essay on the ruddy kingfisher, in Japanese.
