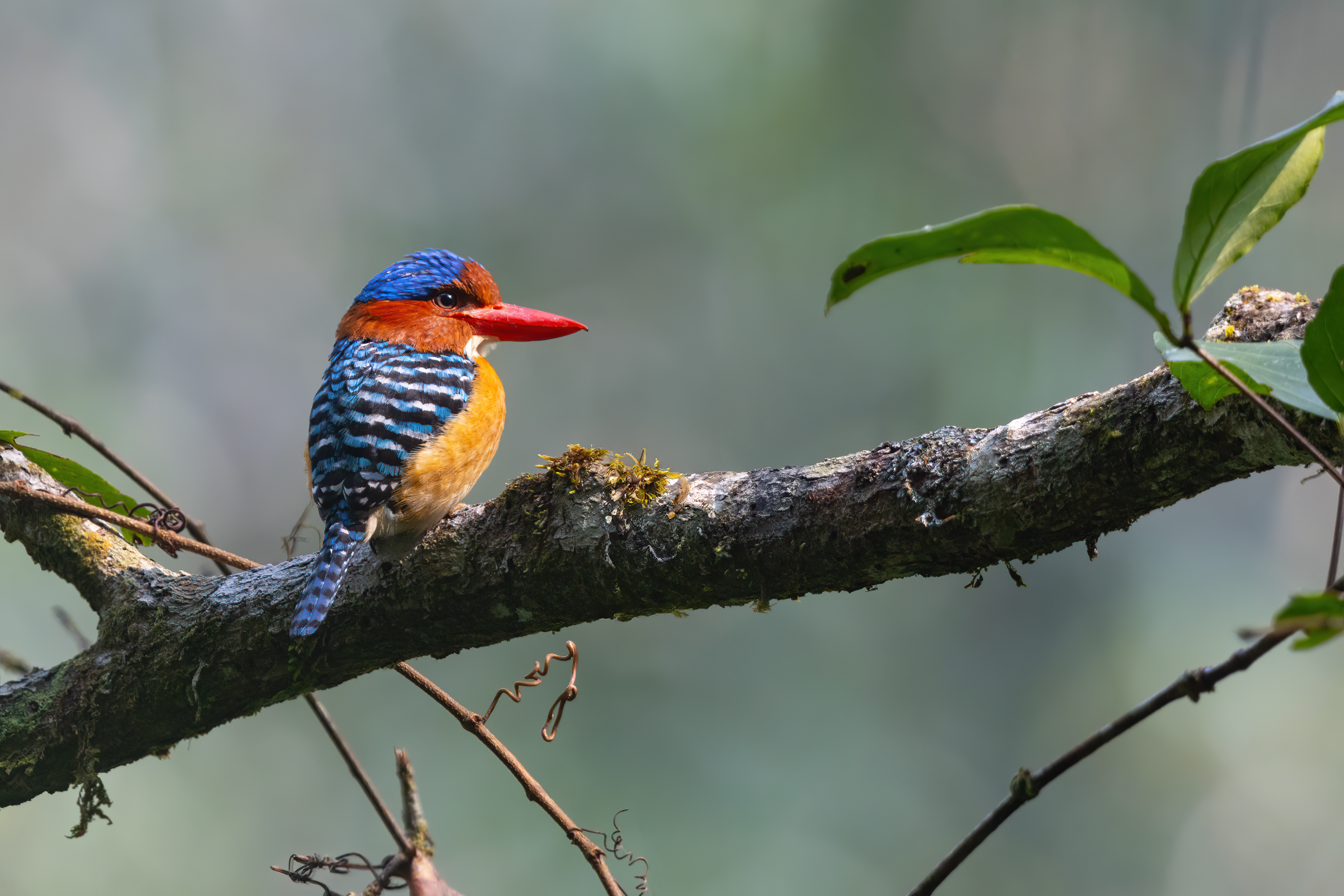
- A male, in Sumatra, Indonesia
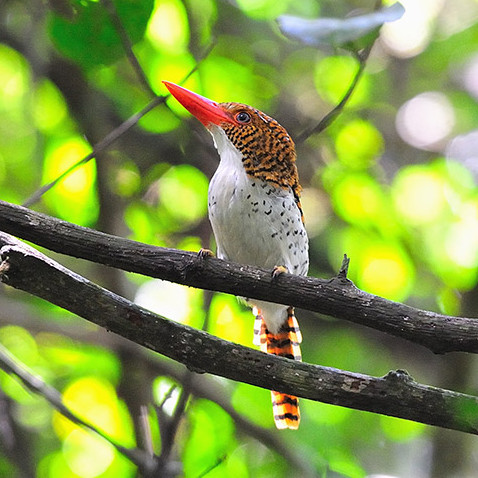
- A female in Thailand: Calls captured at the Khao Soi Dao Wildlife Sanctuary, Thailand

Conservation status
- Least Concern (IUCN 3.1)

Scientific classification
- Kingdom: Animalia
- Phylum: Chordata
- Class: Aves
- Order: Coraciiformes
- Family: Alcedinidae
- Subfamily: Halcyoninae
- Genus: Lacedo; Reichenbach, 1851
- Species: L. pulchella

Binomial name
- Lacedo pulchella (Horsfield, 1821)

Subspecies
- L. p. amabilis - (Hume, 1873); L. p. pulchella - (Horsfield, 1821); L. p. melanops - (Bonaparte, 1850)

= Banded kingfisher =

Species of bird

The banded kingfisher (Lacedo pulchella) is a tree kingfisher found in lowland tropical forests of southeast Asia. It is the only member of the genus Lacedo. Male and female adults are very different in plumage. The male has a bright blue crown with black and blue banding on the back. The female has rufous and black banding on the head and upperparts.

== Taxonomy ==
The first formal description of the species was by the American naturalist Thomas Horsfield in 1821 under the binomial name Dacelo pulchella. The current genus Lacedo was introduced by the German ornithologist Ludwig Reichenbach in 1851. The word Lacedo is an anagram of Alcedo, the Latin word for kingfisher. The specific name pulchella is Latin for "very pretty".

There are three subspecies:

- L. p. pulchella, the nominate race, breeds in Malaysia south of 7°N and on the islands of Sumatra and Java.
- L. p. amabilis breeds from northern Malaysia northwards. It is slightly larger than the nominate form. The male has a blue nape, and the female is more rufous than pulchella.
- L. p. melanops breeds in Bangka and Borneo. The male has a black forehead, cheeks and nape.

== Description ==
The banded kingfisher is 20 cm (7.9 in) long with a sturdy red bill and a short crest which is slowly raised and lowered. It shows striking sexual dimorphism compared to most of its relatives. The adult male has a chestnut forehead, cheeks and nape, and a bright blue cap. The rest of the upperparts, wings and tail are black with blue bands. The breast, flanks and undertail are rufous, and the central belly is white.

The adult female is equally striking, with black-and-rufous-banded upperparts, and white underparts with some black bars on the chest and flanks. Young birds are duller than the adult of the same sex, have a brown and orange bill, and dusky barring on the underparts.

The call is a long whistled wheeeoo followed by 15 repetitions of chiwiu in 17 seconds, the second syllable gradually fading away. The banded kingfisher will respond to imitations of its call.

== Distribution and habitat ==
The species occurs in Myanmar, Thailand, Cambodia, Vietnam, Laos, Malaysia, Sumatra, Java and Brunei. It is rare in Java, very rare in Sumatra and extinct in Singapore.

== Behaviour ==
This is a bird of lowland rainforest found up to 1,700 m in Brunei, but normally below 1100 m altitude in the rest of its range. Unlike most kingfishers, it does not need pools or streams in its territory.

The nest is a hole in a rotting tree trunk, or sometimes in the spherical nest of tree termites. Two to five white eggs are laid. In Thailand the eggs are laid between February and May.

The banded kingfisher hunts large insects and occasionally small lizards, usually taken in the trees, but sometimes from the ground.
