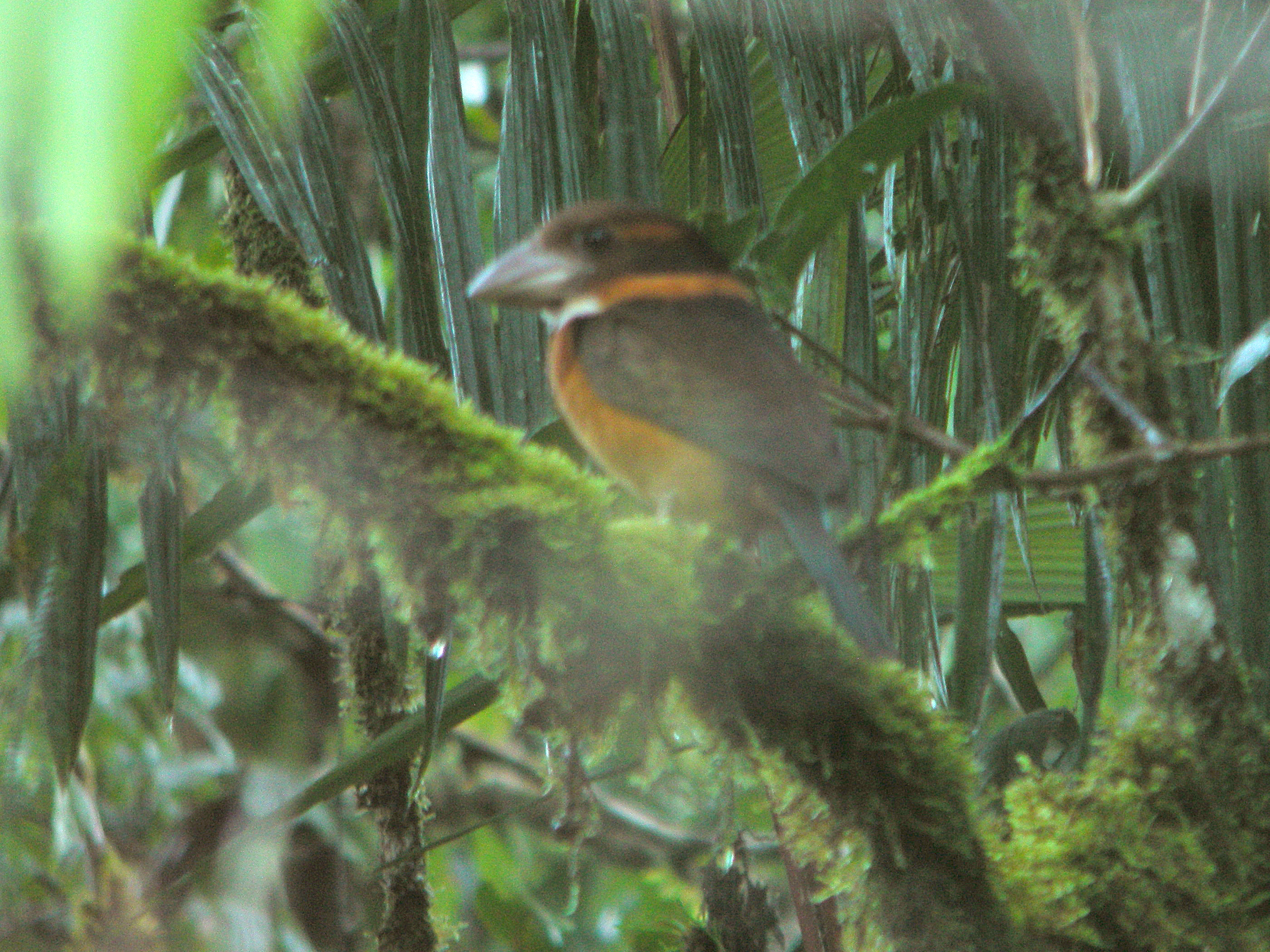

Conservation status
- Least Concern (IUCN 3.1)

Scientific classification
- Kingdom: Animalia
- Phylum: Chordata
- Class: Aves
- Order: Coraciiformes
- Family: Alcedinidae
- Subfamily: Halcyoninae
- Genus: Dacelo
- Species: D. rex

Binomial name
- Dacelo rex (Sharpe, 1880)

Synonyms
- Clytoceyx rex Sharpe, 1880

= Shovel-billed kookaburra =

Species of bird

The shovel-billed kookaburra (Dacelo rex), also known as the shovel-billed kingfisher, is a large, approximately 33 cm (13 in) long, dark brown tree kingfisher with a heavy, short, and broad bill that is unique among the kingfishers. It has a dark head with a rufous (reddish/brown or rust coloured) stripe behind the eyes, a white throat, a rufous neck collar and underparts, a bright blue rump, brown iris, brownish-black bill with paler mandible (entire bill often appears brownish due to earth), and pale feet. Both sexes are similar in appearance, but are easily recognized from the colour of the tail. The male has a dark bluish tail while female's is rufous. The juvenile has a female-like plumage with scale-patterned feathers.

Formerly considered the sole representative of the genus Clytoceyx, a molecular phylogenetic study published in 2017 found that the shovel-billed kookaburra nested with the kookaburras in the genus Dacelo. It was reclassified into Dacelo by the International Ornithological Congress in 2023.

The shovel-billed kookaburra is endemic to New Guinea. No subspecies are recognised because the differences in plumage between the races imperator and septentrionalis is small. It primarily occurs in hill forests, but has been recorded from sea-level up to an altitude of 2400 m (7850 ft). The shovel-billed kookaburra finds its food in mud or on moist ground. The diet consists mainly of earthworms, snails, beetles, lizards, and insects. It is inconspicuous and infrequently seen. It is likely that it is partially crepuscular.

Widespread but uncommon throughout a large part of New Guinea, the shovel-billed kookaburra has a wide range and no special threats have been identified, so the bird is evaluated as being of Least Concern on the IUCN Red List of Threatened Species.
