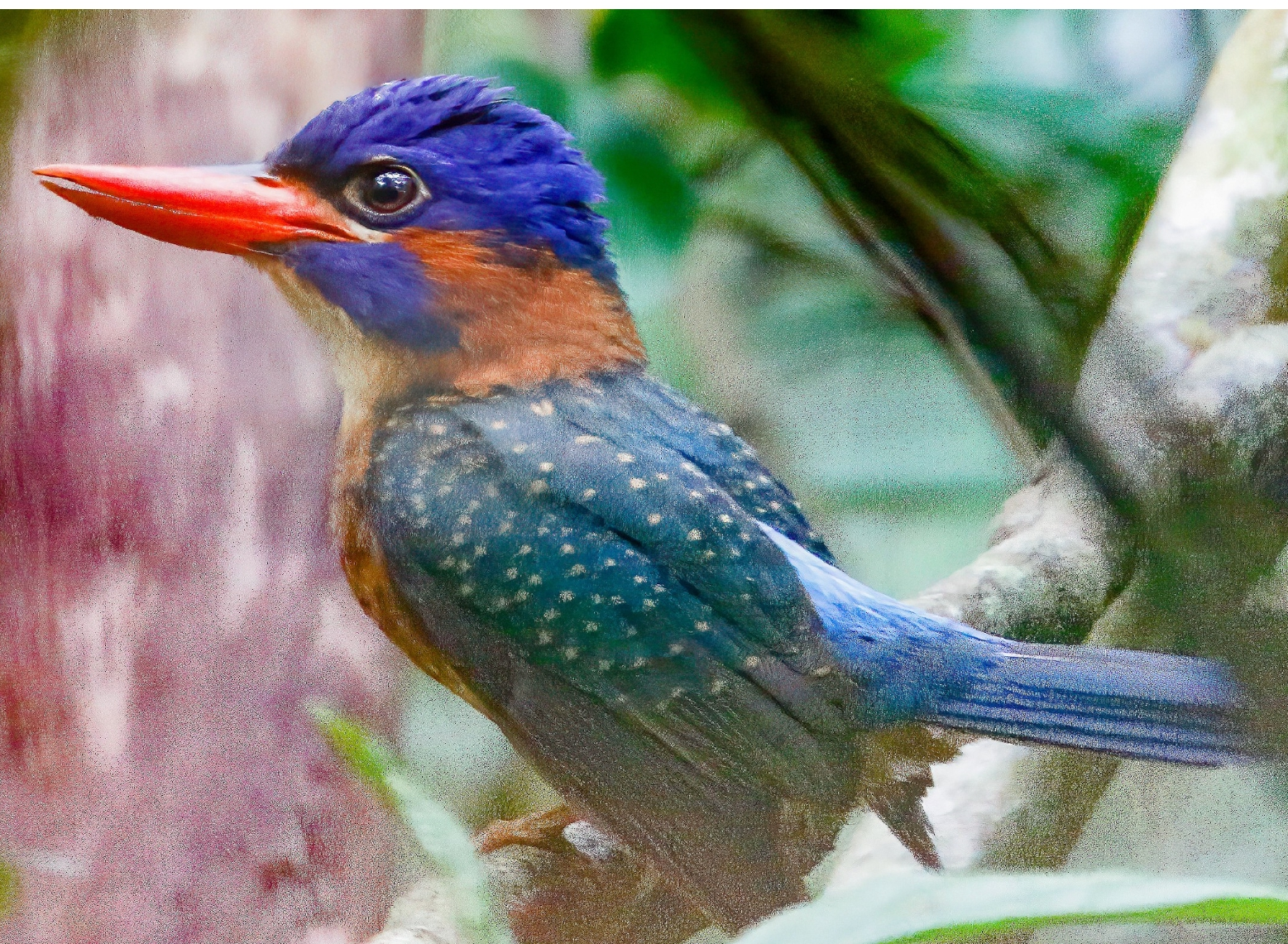
- Male
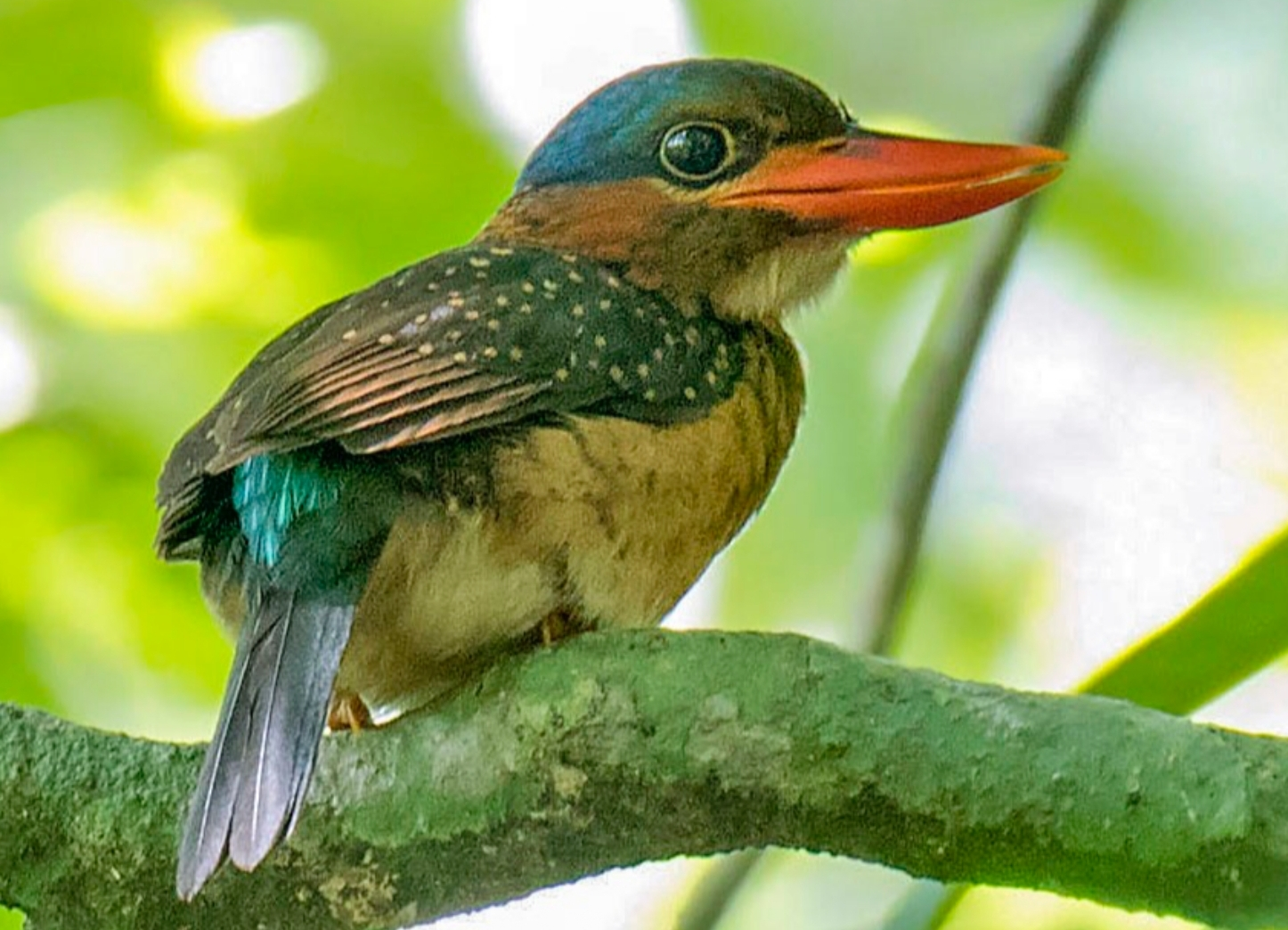
- Female

Conservation status
- Least Concern (IUCN 3.1)

Scientific classification
- Kingdom: Animalia
- Phylum: Chordata
- Class: Aves
- Order: Coraciiformes
- Family: Alcedinidae
- Subfamily: Halcyoninae
- Genus: Actenoides
- Species: A. hombroni

Binomial name
- Actenoides hombroni Bonaparte, 1850

= Blue-capped kingfisher =

Species of bird

The blue-capped kingfisher (Actenoides hombroni), also known as Hombron's kingfisher, is a species of bird in the family Alcedinidae endemic to the Philippines and found only on Mindanao. It is one of the most colorful kingfishers in the country having a dark blue (green for females) cap and wings with rufous spots, a striped rufous belly, white chin and red bill . Its natural habitats are on the upper ranges of tropical moist lowland forest and tropical moist montane forests. It is threatened by habitat loss and its population is declining.

== Description and taxonomy ==
This is described as a medium sized kingfisher found only in the forests of Mindanao. It has a bright all red bill, a white throat, a blue rump, reddish brown scaly patterns on its underparts and cheek. It has wings white light brown spotting.

These kingfishers exhibit sexual dimorphism in which the males have the eponymous dark blue-cap and dark blue wings. Only males have a dark blue moustachial stripe/ The females on the other hand have aqua-green cap and wings.

Its call is a rapid stuterring trill of 4 to 8 notes. Another call is described as a single downslurred whistle.

This species is a sister species to the Spotted wood kingfisher of Luzon and West Visayas and the Rufous-collared kingfisher of Southeast Asia.

This species is monotypic and now has no subspecies. The birds from East Mindanao were once described as the subspecies burtoni are poorly differentiated.

== Ecology and behavior ==
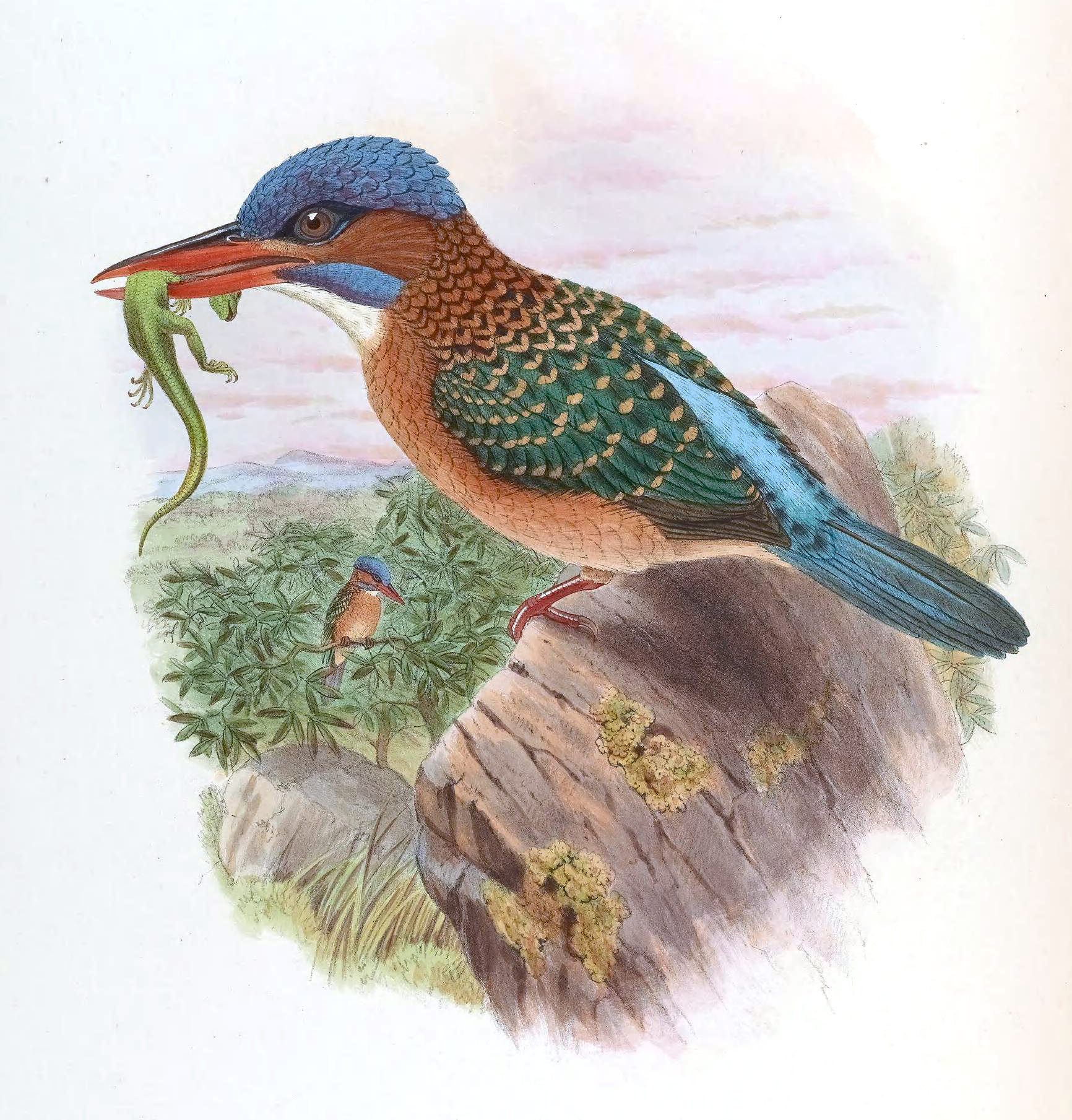
An illustration by John Gould

Feeds on large insects such as grasshoppers, beetles, larvae, snails and also small vertebrates such as frogs and small snakes. It has also been recorded occasionally feeding on fish. This species perches in the lower storeys and flies to the ground to catch its prey. This species is most vocal at dawn.

Breeding season is believed to be January to July. This species has been seen nesting on large termite mounds but no papers and studies have been published on this species.

== Habitat and conservation status ==
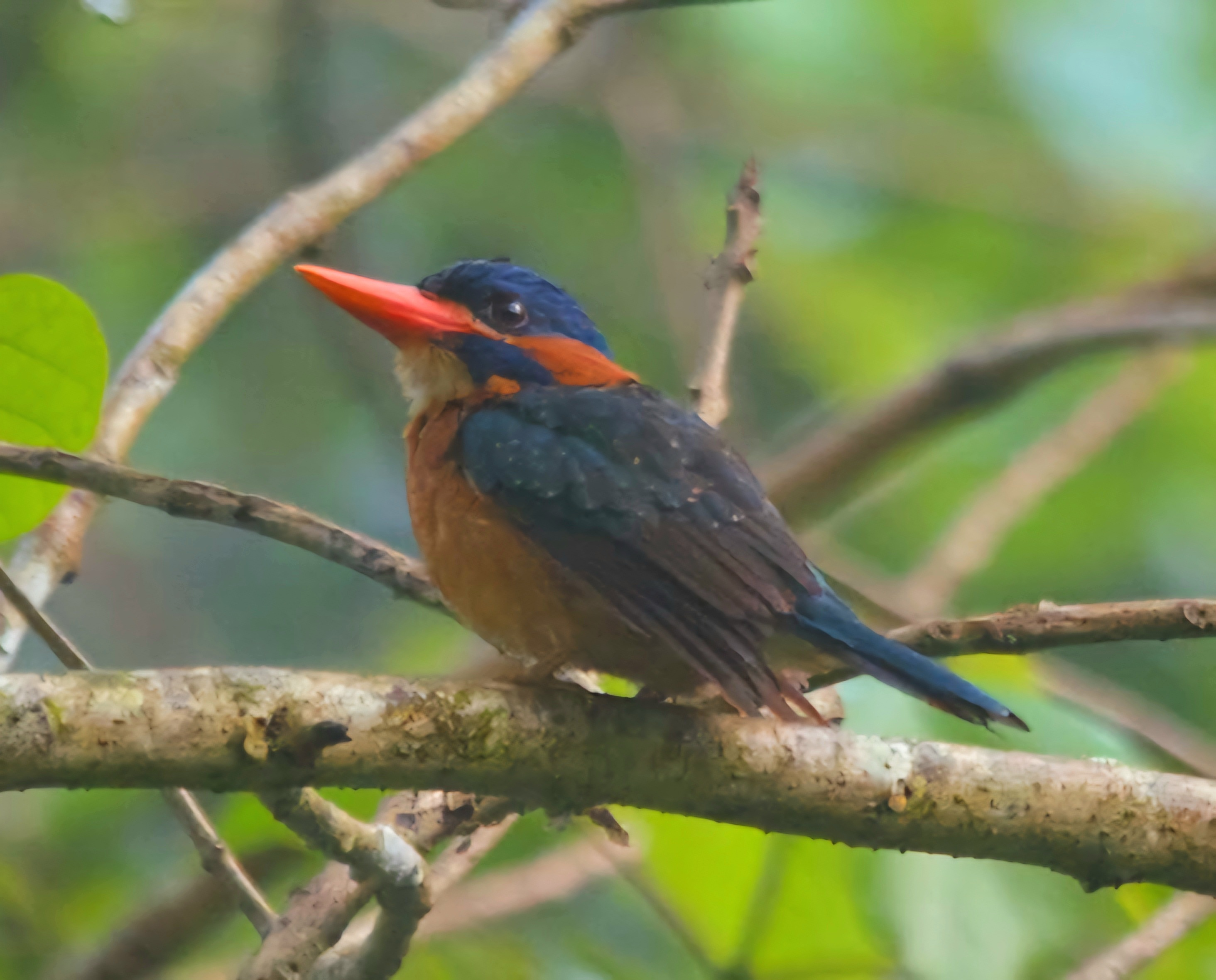
Male

Its natural habitats are on the upper ranges of tropical moist lowland forest and tropical moist montane forests having a wide altitude range of 100 -2,400 meters above sea level but with majority of records are above 1,000 masl. They are often found close to streams.

This species was previously assessed by the IUCN Red List as a Vulnerable species with its population estimated at 2,500 to 9,999 mature individuals as it was believed to have a very small range. However, in 2024 this species was reassessed as Least-concern species but still with a declining population. This species was more common and widespread than originally thought and the montane habitat is more insulated from habitat loss due to inaccessibility. This species' main threat is habitat loss with wholesale clearance of forest habitats as a result of logging, agricultural conversion and mining activities occurring within the range. This species appears to show a preference for montane habitats which are most at risk from mining activities especially for chromite and nickel.

It occurs in a few protected areas like Pasonanca Natural Park, Mount Kitanglad National Park, Mount Apo National Park and Mt. Hilong-hilong Watershed but as with most areas in the Philippines protection and enforcement are lax.
