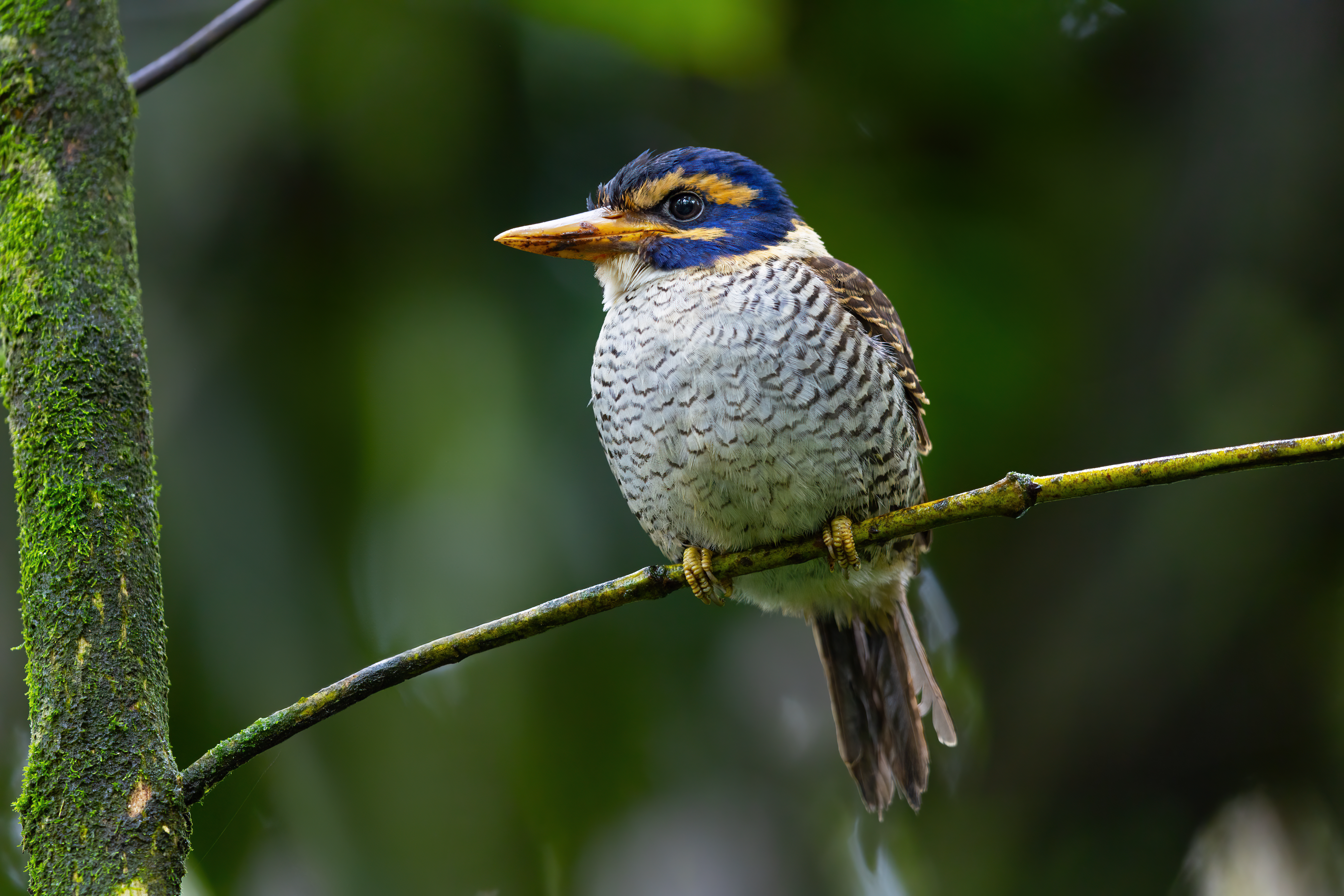
- Female
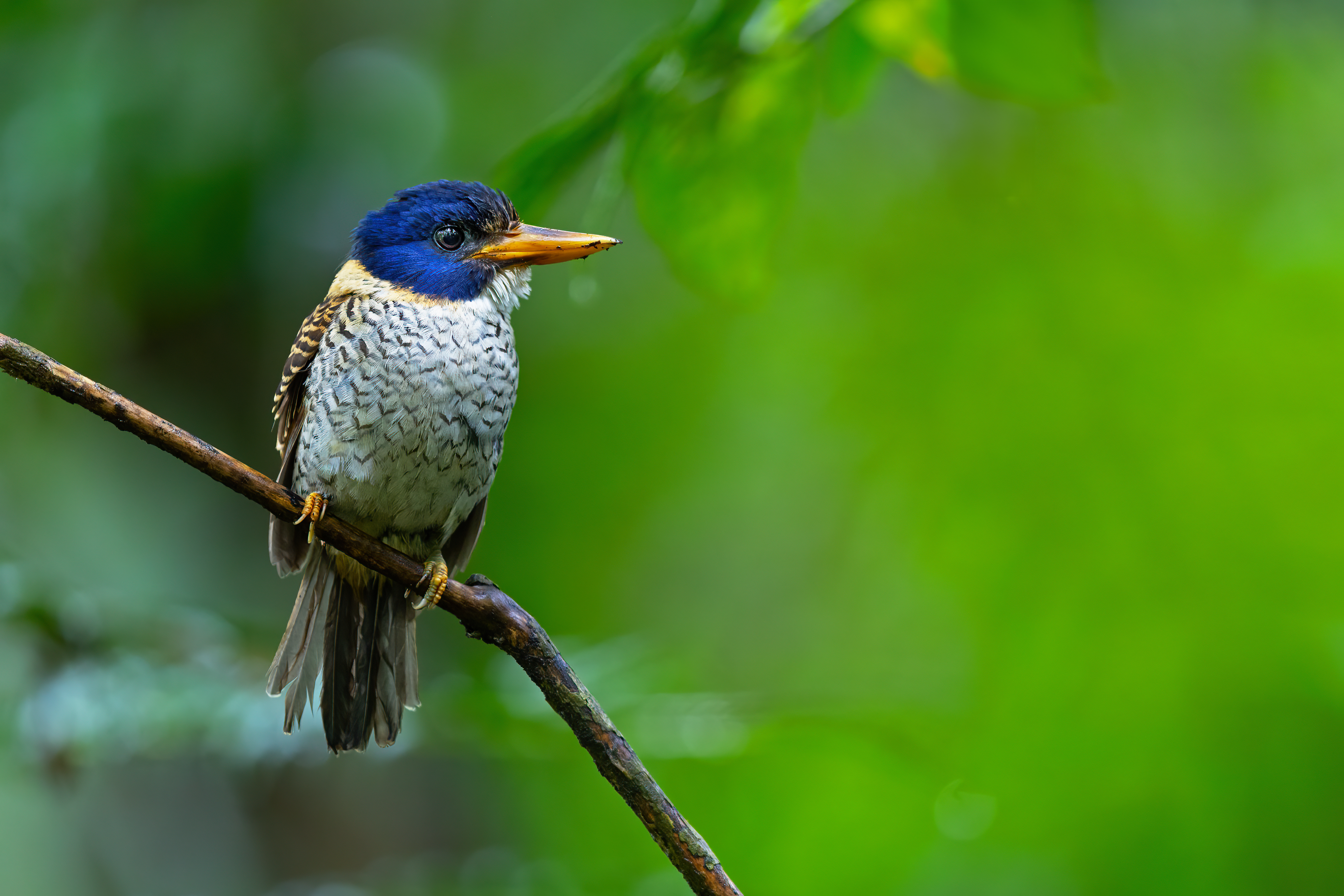
- Male

Conservation status
- Least Concern (IUCN 3.1)

Scientific classification
- Kingdom: Animalia
- Phylum: Chordata
- Class: Aves
- Order: Coraciiformes
- Family: Alcedinidae
- Subfamily: Halcyoninae
- Genus: Actenoides
- Species: A. princeps

Binomial name
- Actenoides princeps (Reichenbach, 1851)

Subspecies
- A. p. princeps - (Reichenbach, 1851); A. p. erythrorhamphus - (Stresemann, 1931); A. p. regalis - (Stresemann, 1932)

= Scaly-breasted kingfisher =

Species of bird

The scaly-breasted kingfisher or regent kingfisher (Actenoides princeps) is a species of bird in the family Alcedinidae endemic to central and southwestern Sulawesi in Indonesia. Its natural habitat is subtropical or tropical, moist, montane forests.

== Description ==
The adult scaly-breasted kingfisher measures about 24 cm (9 in) in length. It has a blue head and reddish-brown collar, and the female has a buff-coloured forehead. The back is dark brown scalloped with buff. The underparts are plain whitish-buff in the male and are barred with darker colour in the female. Birds in the northeast of the range have horn-coloured bills, northwestern birds have red bills, and southern birds have orange and brown bills. Also some differences are seen between the subspecies in the detail of the plumage. The only bird with which this species might be confused is the green-backed kingfisher (Actenoides monachus), also present in Sulawesi, but that species is usually found at lower altitudes and has a dark-green back and reddish-brown underparts.

== Distribution and habitat ==
The scaly-breasted kingfisher is endemic to the island of Sulawesi in Indonesia. Two subspecies are found in moist, montane forests, A. p. princeps from the northeast of the island and A. p. erythrorhamphus from the northwest and central parts. A. p. regalis is found in the southeast, but is now regarded as its own species, the plain-backed kingfisher. In the Minahassa Peninsula of northern Sulawesi, the nominate subspecies is found in the Gunung Ambang Nature Reserve in primary forest at elevations between 1,050 and 1,550 metres (3,440 and 5,090 ft) above sea level. Its habitat is the dense understorey of undisturbed primary forest.

== Behaviour ==
The call of the scaly-breasted kingfisher, a series of mournful whistles, is more likely to be heard around dawn than later in the day. It perches on a branch in the forest and periodically makes short flights with its wings creating a whirring noise. It feeds on beetles and other small invertebrates. One female was observed to eat a lizard. It is believed to nest in holes in earth banks.

== Status ==
The scaly-breasted kingfisher has a somewhat restricted range in Indonesia and its population size is believed to be decreasing due to habitat loss, but is considered to be least concern by the IUCN.

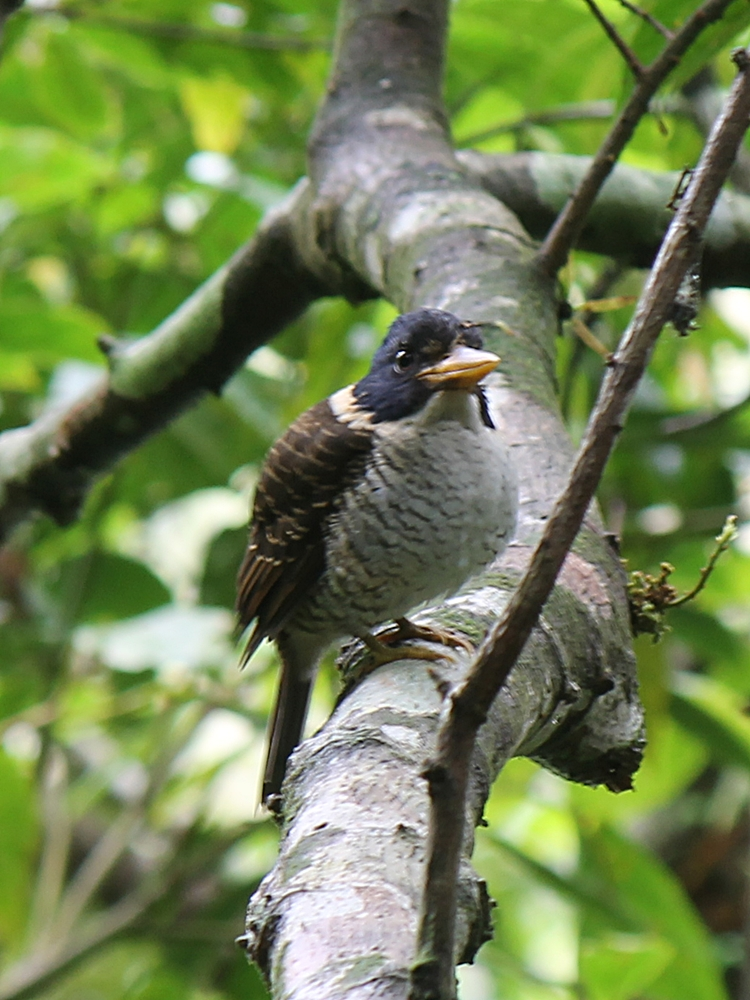
Adult male

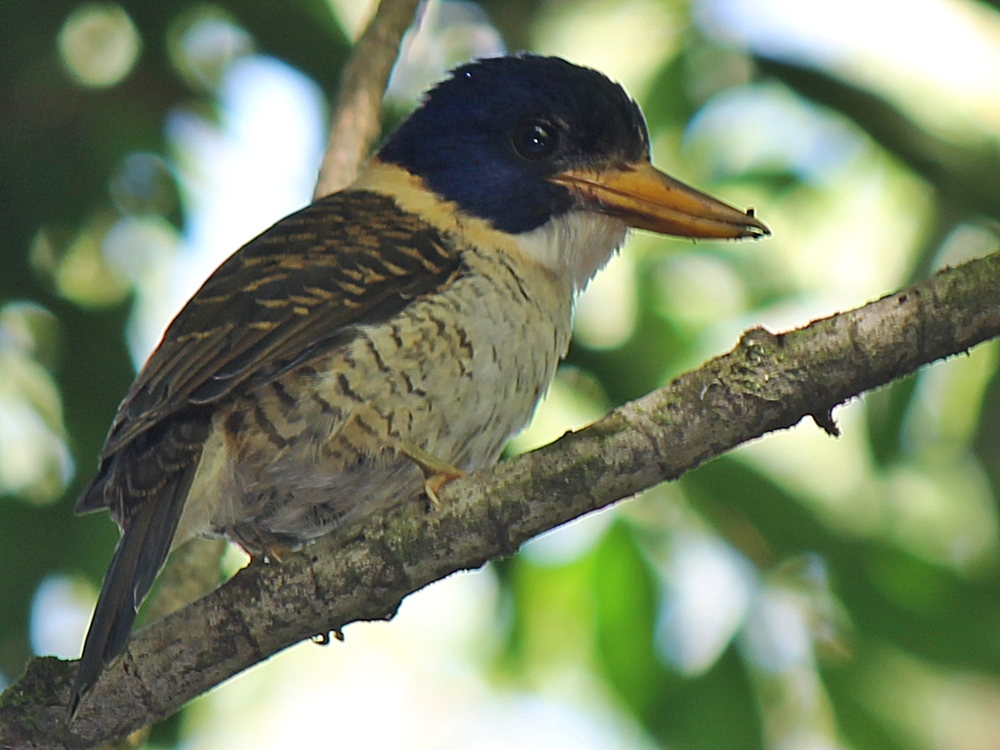
Male

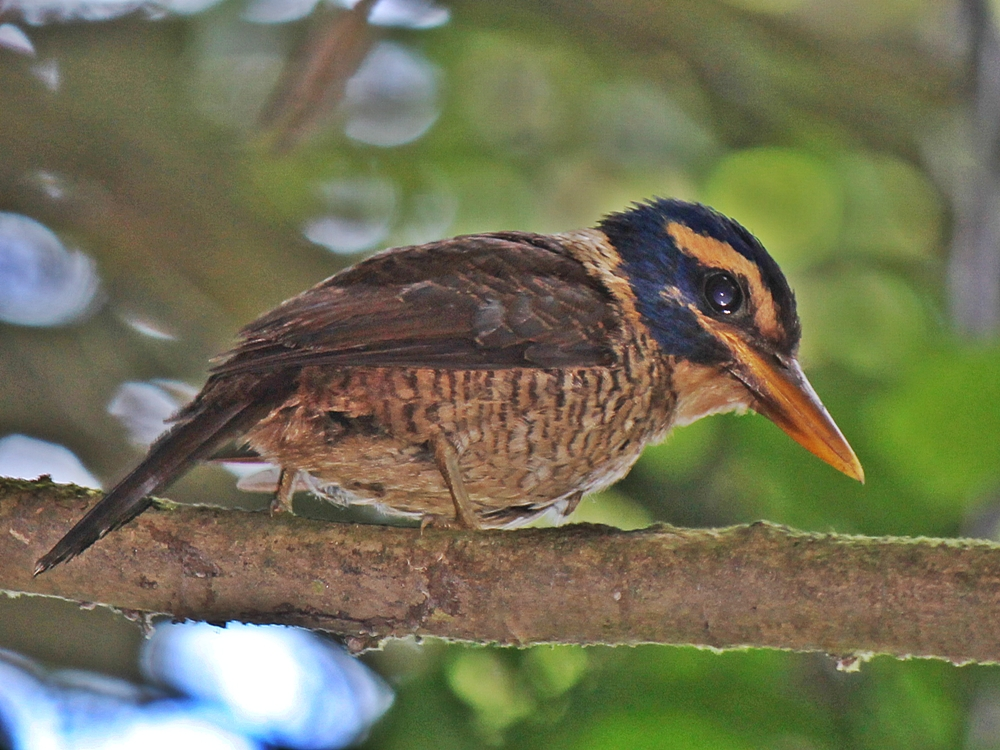
Female

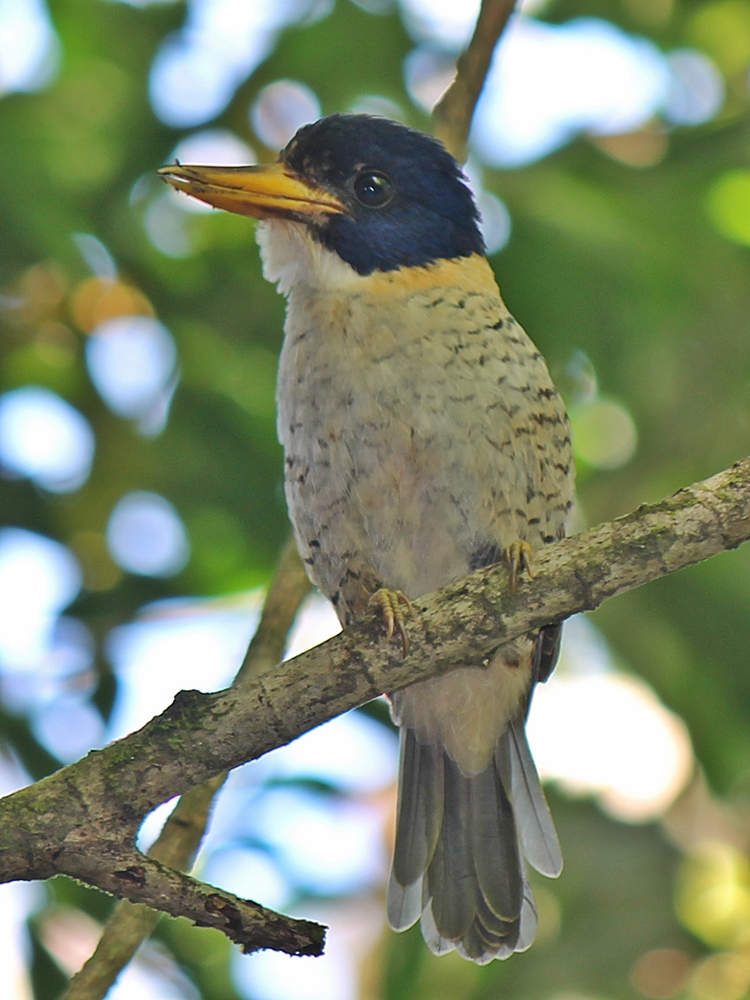
Male
