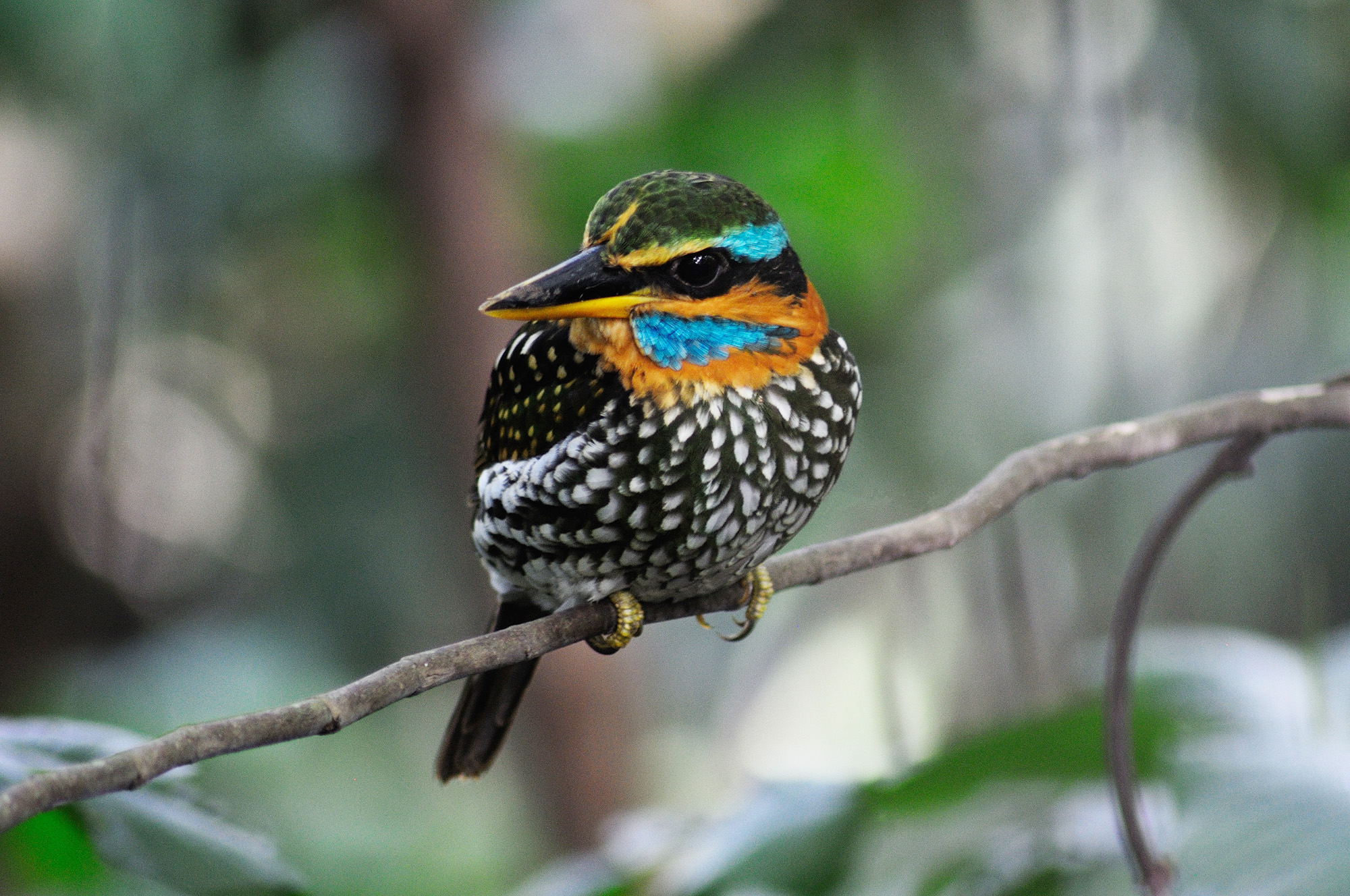
- Male
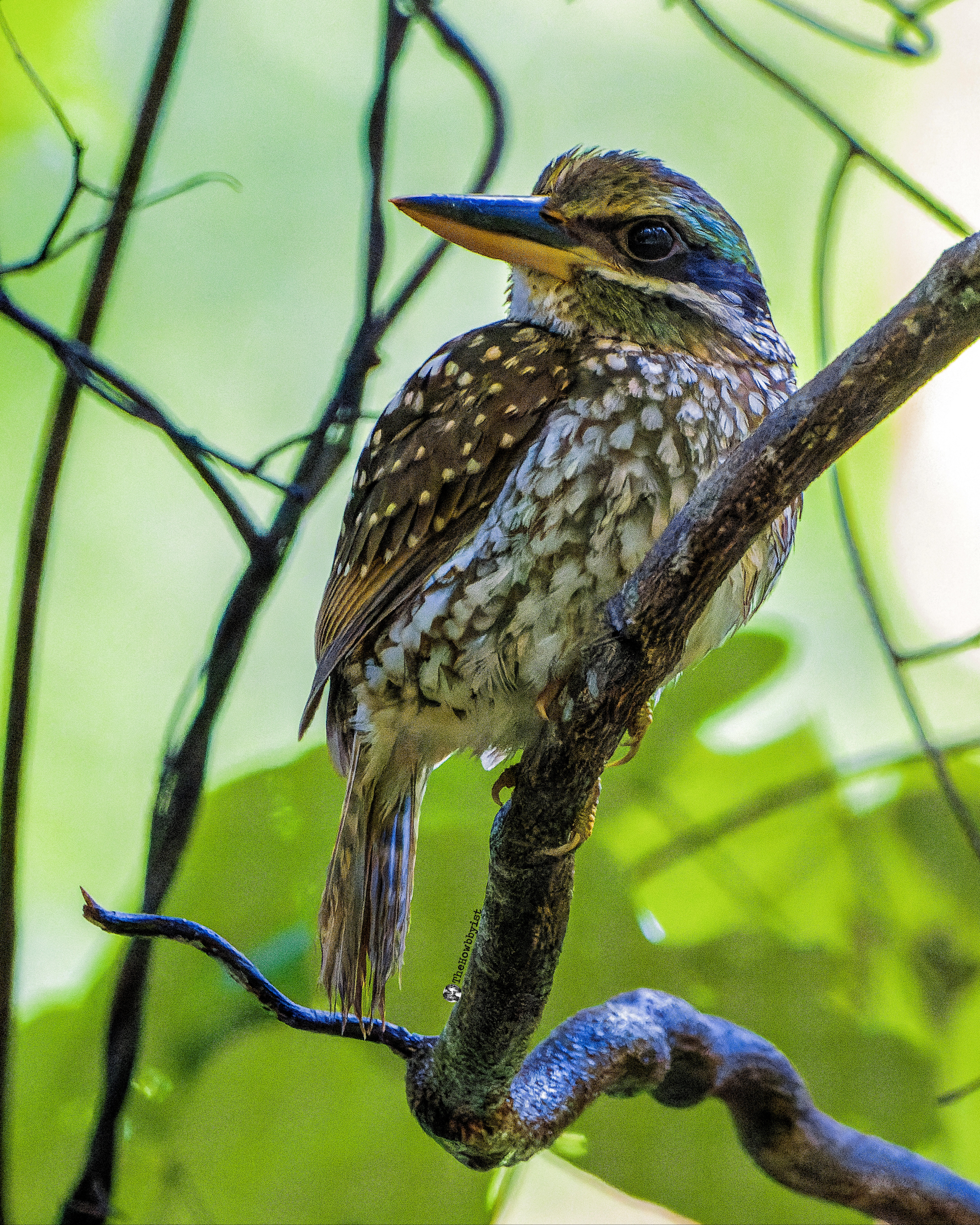
- Female

Conservation status
- Least Concern (IUCN 3.1)

Scientific classification
- Kingdom: Animalia
- Phylum: Chordata
- Class: Aves
- Order: Coraciiformes
- Family: Alcedinidae
- Subfamily: Halcyoninae
- Genus: Actenoides
- Species: A. lindsayi

Binomial name
- Actenoides lindsayi (Vigors, 1831)

Subspecies
- A. l. lindsayi - Vigors, 1831; A. l. moseleyi - Steere, 1890

= Spotted wood kingfisher =

Species of bird

The spotted wood kingfisher or spotted kingfisher (Actenoides lindsayi) is a species of bird in the family Alcedinidae. It is endemic to the Philippines found on the islands of Luzon, Catanduanes, Marinduque, Negros and Panay where its natural habitat is tropical moist lowland forests.

== Description and taxonomy ==
The spotted wood kingfisher is a colourful bird that can readily be distinguished from other kingfishers in the Philippines. It is about 26 cm (10 in) long with spotting above and scalloping beneath. The male has a dark green crown with black spots and a light green stripe above a pale blue supercilium with a black band beneath. A blue moustache is bordered above and below by an orange-brown band and collar. The upper parts are dark green, each feather being tipped with buff giving a spotted effect. The rump is bright green and the tail dark green with brown bars on the outer feathers. The throat is orange-brown and the underparts are mainly white, the breast feathers having green margins. The under-wing coverts are buff. The upper mandible of the bill is black and the lower mandible yellow, the iris is brown and the legs pale green.

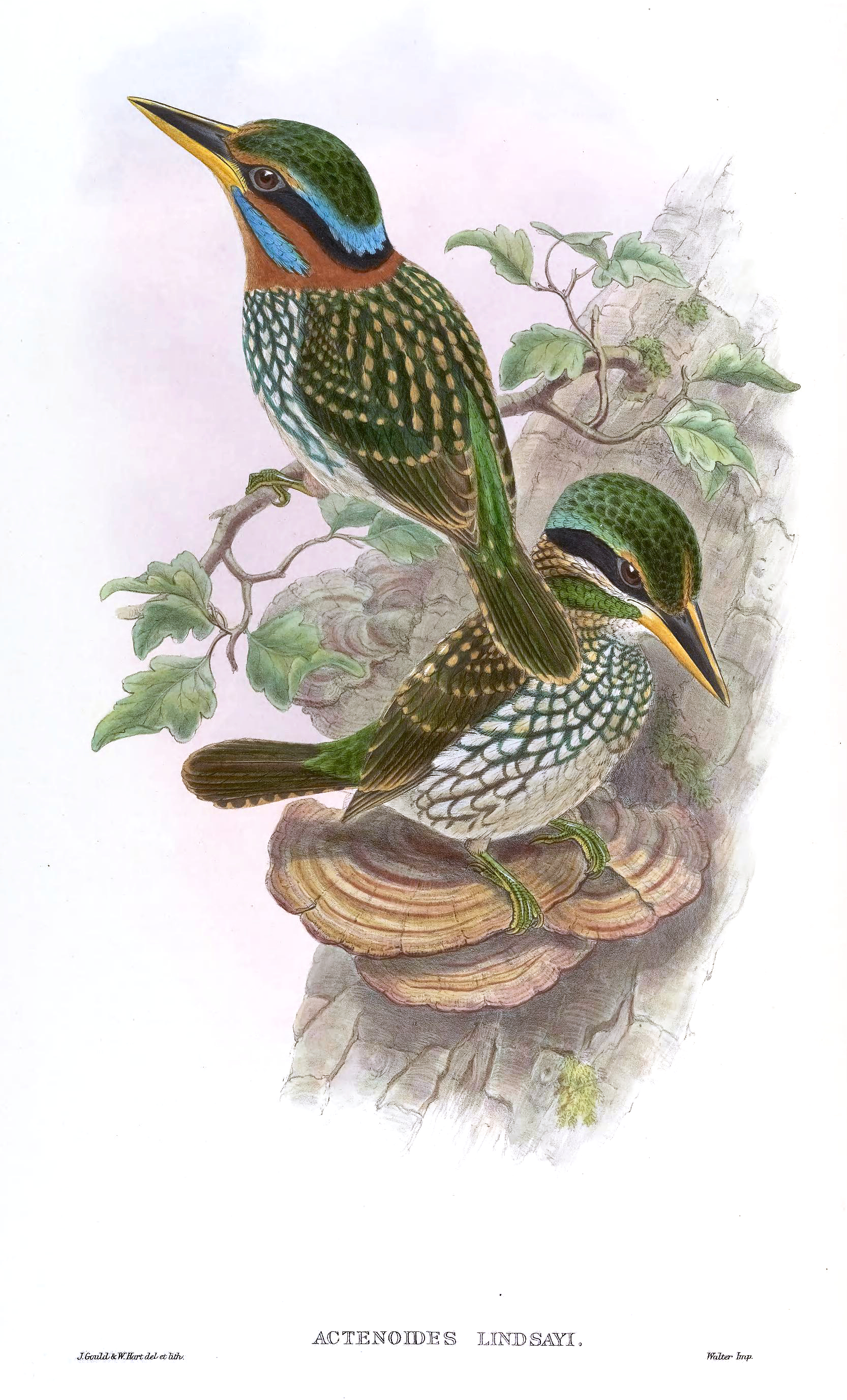
Illustration by John Gould male above, female below

The female is similar in appearance but less brightly coloured, the supercilium is green rather than blue, the moustache brownish-green, the hind-neck collar brownish-black and the throat the same colour as the breast. The juvenile resembles the female but has a generally duller colouration.

It is believed to be a sister species to the Blue-capped kingfisher and Rufous-collared kingfisher.

=== Subspecies ===
- A. l. lindseyi – Found on Luzon and Catanduanes;
- A. l. moseleyi – Found Panay and Negros; Darker and browner above, buff spots somewhat larger and more rounded.

== Ecology and behaviour ==
The spotted wood kingfisher occurs in pairs or as a solitary bird but is seldom seen because it moves around in dense cover in the lower storey of the forest. It feeds on beetles and other insects, snails and small vertebrates which it probably finds while foraging on the ground. Typically most vocal at dawn and dusk.

Little is known of its breeding behaviour; it is thought to nest in termite nests in trees, but this may not be the case because other members of the genus mostly choose to nest in holes in trees or in the ground.

== Habitat and Conservation Status ==
It inhabits moist primary forest in both lowland and hilly areas. It was more abundant on Luzon in the past but logging has reduced the area of suitable habitat. On Negros, it has been recorded on dense scrub and gardens.

The International Union for Conservation of Nature has rated its conservation status as least concern but is believed to be declining due to deforestation from land conversion, Illegal logging and slash-and-burn farming. it is generally uncommon but has a large range across West Visayas and Luzon. More surveys and understanding of its biology are needed and it is highly possible that this species be uplisted due to habitat destruction.

It is found in multiple protected areas such as Mount Banahaw, Mount Makiling, Mount Isarog, Bataan National Park and Northern Sierra Madre Natural Park, Mt. Kanlaon Natural Park and Northern Negros Natural Park but like all areas in the Philippines, protection is lax and deforestation and hunting continues despite this protection on paper.
