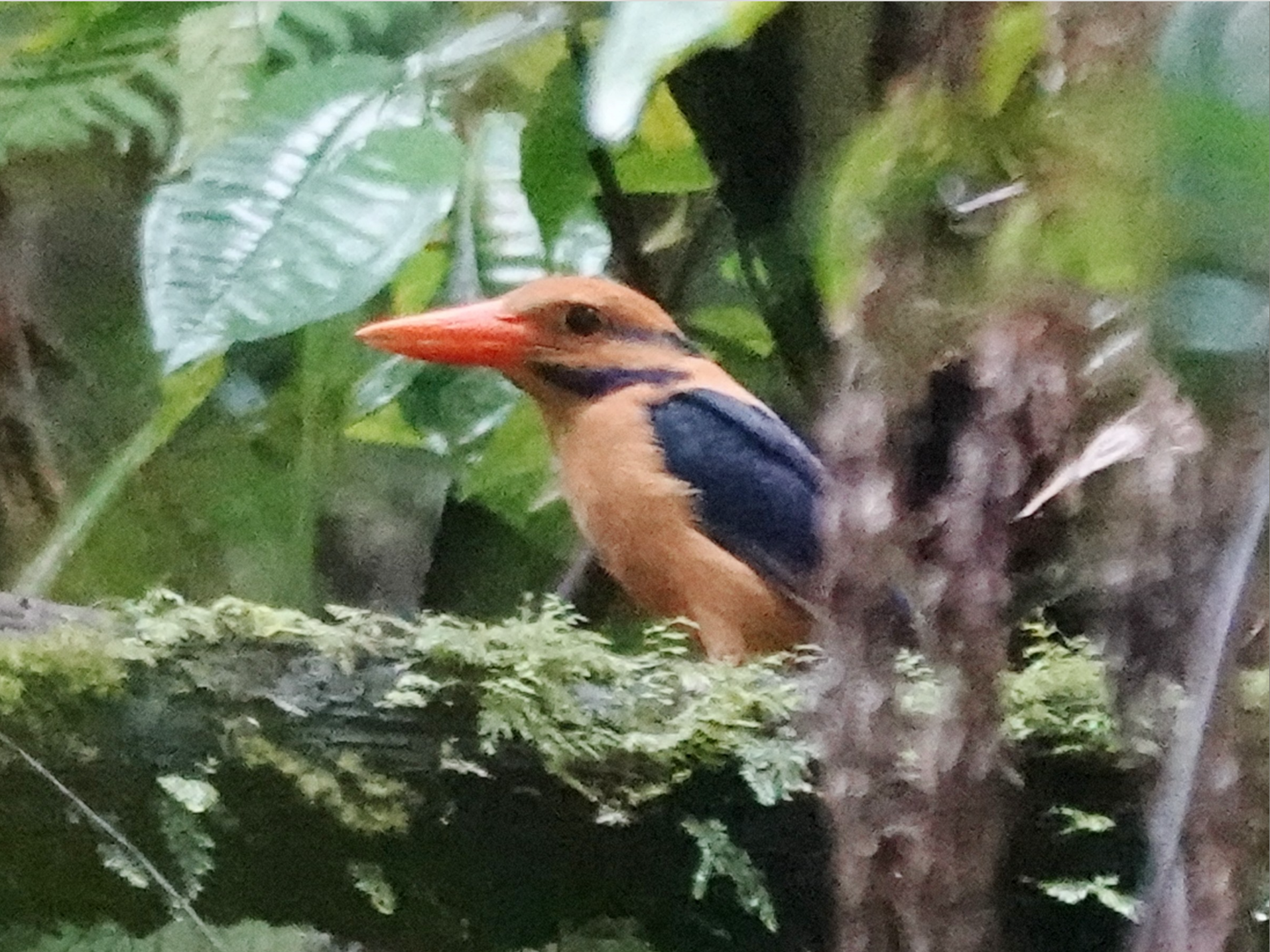

Conservation status
- Least Concern (IUCN 3.1)

Scientific classification
- Kingdom: Animalia
- Phylum: Chordata
- Class: Aves
- Order: Coraciiformes
- Family: Alcedinidae
- Subfamily: Halcyoninae
- Genus: Actenoides
- Species: A. bougainvillei

Binomial name
- Actenoides bougainvillei (Rothschild, 1904)

Subspecies
- A. b. bougainvillei - (Rothschild, 1904); A. b. excelsus - (Mayr, 1941)

= Moustached kingfisher =

Species of bird

The moustached kingfisher (Actenoides bougainvillei), also called Bougainville moustached kingfisher, is a species of bird in the family Alcedinidae. It is endemic to Bougainville Island in Papua New Guinea. An estimated 1,300–7,000 mature individuals are left.

Their natural habitats are subtropical or tropical, moist, lowland forests and subtropical or tropical, moist, montane forests; they nest in tree holes. They are threatened by habitat loss and introduced predators.

The Guadalcanal moustached kingfisher was previously lumped together with A. bougainvillei, but is now regarded as a separate species. It was first described in 1904, and in the late 1930s, a dozen specimens were collected in southern Bougainville. In 1941, A. b. excelsus was described on the basis of a single specimen from Guadalcanal, and later in 1953, two more specimens were obtained. In 2015, a male specimen was killed and collected by a team from the American Museum of Natural History headed by Christopher Filardi. In 2024, one pair was recorded by a birdwatching tour group on Bougainville after ten days of searching. They photographed the male, and recordings of the song were noted to sound different to those from Guadalcanal.

== Description ==
The average length of this bird is 32 cm. It is large, orange to red bill and purple-blue moustache, wings, and tail.

The two subspecies are:

- A. b. bougainvillei can be found in Bougainville Island, Papua New Guinea. The immature plumage is unknown. However, the adult male has dark tawny-orange forehead, crown, cheeks and mantle. A narrow, delineated purple-blue line runs from behind the eye to the nape, and a broader one forms a long moustache stripe from the lower mandible, curving under and behind the cheeks and ear coverts. The upper back, scapulars, wings, side of rump, and tail are a dark purple-blue, while the lower back and centre of rump and uppertail-coverts are a brilliant pale azure blue. The underparts are orange-rufous, paler on the chin, belly and undertail-coverts than on the breast and flanks. The bill is red and the eyes are dark brown. The legs and feet have brown nails. The adult female is like the male, except that the upper back, scapulars, and tertials are olive green and the head is a darker rufous, merging into the mantle. The wingspan of a male is 127–136 mm and the female's is 127–133 mm. The tail's length of a male is 85–95 mm while the female's is 91–96 mm. The length of the bill on a male ranges from 49–58 mm, while on the female it ranges from 46–51 mm. The tarsus of both male and female ranges from 19–21 mm. The recorded weight ranges from 160 to 215 g.
- A. b. excelsus can be found in Guadalcanal in the Solomon Islands. The adult female is more olive-green on the back, scapulars, and tertials, and has much paler orange underparts than the other subspecies. An immature male has the upper back, scapular, and tertials very dark olive-green.

The moustached kingfisher is considered least concern by the International Union for Conservation of Nature

== Taxonomy ==
The moustached kingfisher belongs to the family Alcedinidae, subfamily Halcyoninae, which are more advanced than the subfamily Alcedininae and more closely related to the subfamily Cerylinae.

== Habitat and distribution ==
It inhabits hill forest in southern Bougainville, and hill and mist forest between 550 m and 1250 m of altitude in Guadalcanal.

In the 1950s, local people observed holes in the riverbanks or in the ground in the forest, which were thought to be the nests of moustached kingfishers. However, they are believed to be opportunistic cavity nesters.

== Behavior ==
The moustached kingfisher is a perch hunter, feeding on insects and small vertebrates. It is capable of fast direct flight due to its rounded wings and a short tail. Its eyes are specialized for accurately sighting prey at a distance. Its head allows it to turn at a wide angle. The species is thought to be territorial as breeding pairs.

It has been reported to dive multiple times to clean off the dirt that may adhere from the nest.

This bird usually calls before dawn and after dusk. Its call is a loud, ringing laugh, 'ko-ko-ko-ko'.
