= Plain-backed kingfisher =

Conservation status
- Vulnerable (IUCN 3.1)

Scientific classification
- Kingdom: Animalia
- Phylum: Chordata
- Class: Aves
- Order: Coraciiformes
- Family: Alcedinidae
- Subfamily: Halcyoninae
- Genus: Actenoides
- Species: A. princeps
- Subspecies: A. p. regalis

Trinomial name
- Actenoides princeps regalis (Stresemann, 1932)

Subspecies of bird

The plain-backed kingfisher (Actenoides princeps regalis) is a kingfisher in the subfamily Halcyoninae that is endemic to southeastern Sulawesi in Indonesia. It is known from two specimens from interior montane forests at an elevation around 2,000 m. It is likely threatened by ongoing deforestation.

The International Ornithologists' Union consider the plain-backed kingfisher as a subspecies of the scaly-breasted kingfisher (Actenoides princeps) but some taxonomists elevate the taxon to species status.
