= Christopher Filardi =

American evolutionary biologist and ecologist

Christopher Filardi is an American evolutionary biologist and ecologist.

Filardi, a 1989 graduate of Bowdoin College, earned his Ph.D. in 2003 from the University of Washington.

As a director at the American Museum of Natural History’s Center for Biodiversity and Conservation, Filardi was an author of The New York Times's Scientist at Work blog; writing about his work in the Solomon Islands.

Filardi and his team became the first to catch a male Moustached kingfisher (three females had been spotted in the past), using a mist net; in a controversial move, the team killed the bird to take him back for further study. The specimen was placed in a carefully maintained part of the museum dedicated to research alongside nearly a million other ornithological specimens. Filardi received threats after collecting the kingfisher, and later wrote in an essay for Audubon describing the steps he'd taken to protect the kingfisher population, including surveying the population, and highlighting the role the bird played in conservation efforts. His findings led tribal, local and national officials to protect the area from being mined or logged.

In the 2010s Filardi was part of a team sponsored by Conservation International and the National Science Foundation to map the process of speciation in the Solomon Islands. The group identified the Solomons frogmouth as a new genus of bird. The team documented the rapid evolution of the Zosteropidae (White-eye) bird into over a hundred species.

In 2014, Filardi co-authored a population study of grizzly bears that was able to use non-invasive methods in keeping with the cultural beliefs and practices of the Heiltsuk Nation to reveal the existence of a much larger population of bears that had been expected in a temperate forest on the central coast of British Columbia.
