= Guadalcanal moustached kingfisher =

Conservation status
- Endangered (IUCN 3.1)

Scientific classification
- Kingdom: Animalia
- Phylum: Chordata
- Class: Aves
- Order: Coraciiformes
- Family: Alcedinidae
- Subfamily: Halcyoninae
- Genus: Actenoides
- Species: A. bougainvillei
- Subspecies: A. b. excelsus

Trinomial name
- Actenoides bougainvillei excelsus (Mayr, 1941)

Subspecies of bird

The Guadalcanal moustached kingfisher (Actenoides bougainvillei excelsus) is a kingfisher in the subfamily Halcyoninae that is endemic to Guadalcanal in the Solomon Islands. The bird can be found in closed-canopy forests at elevations of 900–1,100 m (3,000–3,600 ft), and is reported to nest in holes in the ground. It is considered a subspecies of the moustached kingfisher (Actenoides bougainvillei) by the International Ornithologists' Union but some taxonomists elevate the taxon to species status.

The Guadalcanal moustached kingfisher is named for a stripe of blue feathers from the beak to the side of the head. Males have a blue back; females have a greenish back. Prior to 2015, the species had only been recorded twice, a single female in the 1920s and two females in 1953; no males had ever been recorded, and no live specimens had been photographed. In 2015 a male bird was captured and photographed for the first time in the forests of Guadalcanal. The bird was then killed for scientific study to obtain a set of molecular and morphological data. The killing was criticized as not necessary for science. The researcher who photographed and killed the bird estimated there are over 4000 living birds, the bird is not rare and killing one did not threaten the population viability.
