= Black-headed kingfisher =

Conservation status
- Near Threatened (IUCN 3.1)

Scientific classification
- Kingdom: Animalia
- Phylum: Chordata
- Class: Aves
- Order: Coraciiformes
- Family: Alcedinidae
- Subfamily: Halcyoninae
- Genus: Actenoides
- Species: A. monachus
- Subspecies: A. m. capucinus

Trinomial name
- Actenoides monachus capucinus (Meyer & Wiglesworth, 1896)

Subspecies of bird

The black-headed kingfisher (Actenoides monachus capucinus) is a kingfisher in the subfamily Halcyoninae that is endemic to the eastern and southern regions of Sulawesi in Indonesia. It can be found in dense lowland forests up to 900 m (3,000 ft) elevation. It is threatened by habitat destruction by deforestation.

The black-headed kingfisher is considered as a subspecies of the green-backed kingfisher (Actenoides monachus) by the International Ornithologists' Union but some taxonomists elevate the taxon to species status.
