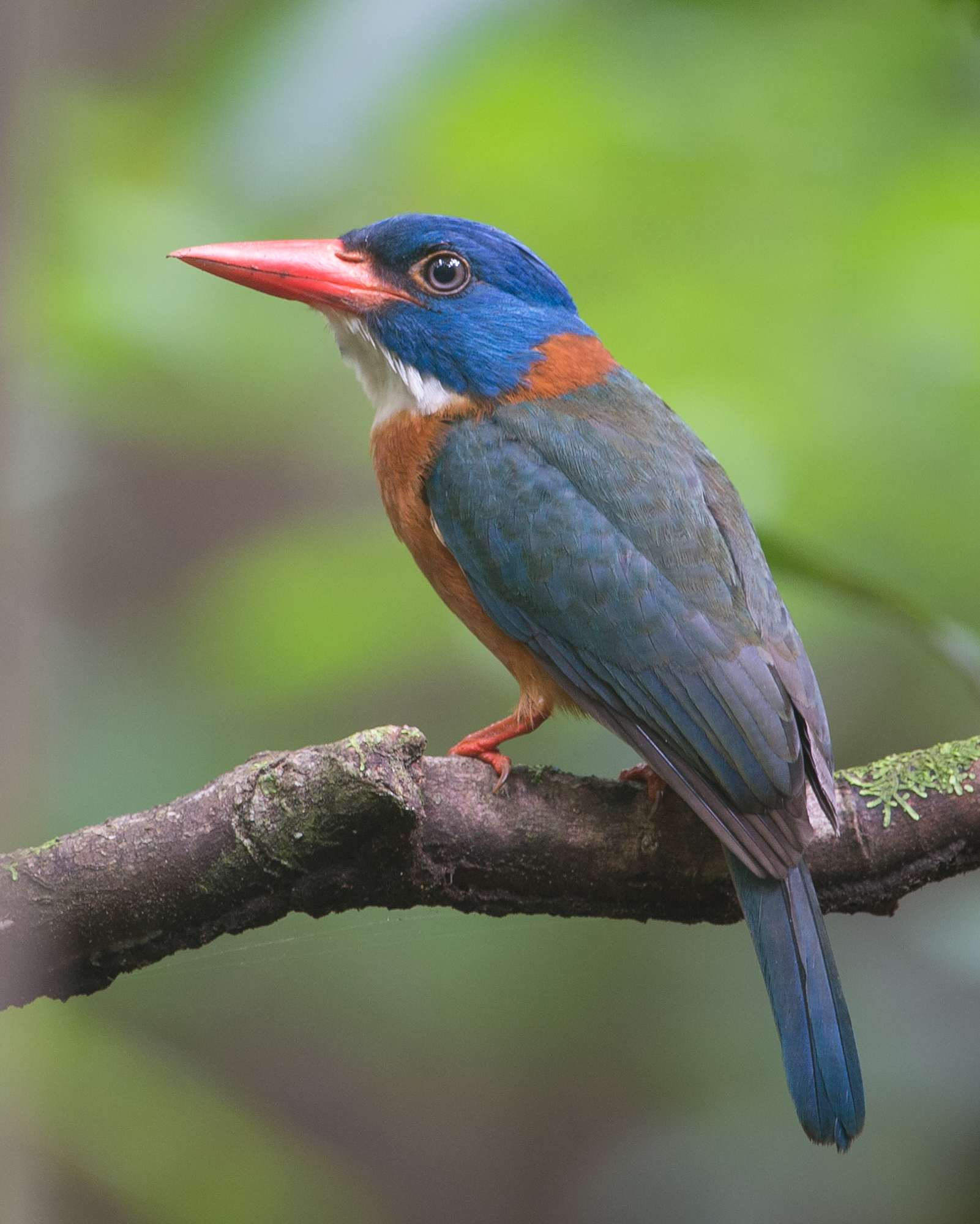
- Green-backed kingfisher (Actenoides monachus)

Scientific classification
- Kingdom: Animalia
- Phylum: Chordata
- Class: Aves
- Order: Coraciiformes
- Family: Alcedinidae
- Subfamily: Halcyoninae
- Genus: Actenoides; Bonaparte, 1850

Species
- see text

= Actenoides =

Genus of birds

Phylogeny

- Actenoides
  - - Glittering kingfisher
      (Caridonax fulgidus)
    - - Scaly-breasted kingfisher
      - Green-backed kingfisher
  - - Spotted wood kingfisher
    - - - Blue-capped kingfisher
        - Rufous-collared kingfisher
      - Moustached kingfisher

Cladogram based on the molecular analysis by Andersen and colleagues published in 2017.

Actenoides is a genus of kingfishers in the subfamily Halcyoninae.

The genus Actenoides was introduced by the French ornithologist Charles Lucien Bonaparte in 1850. The type species is Hombron's kingfisher (Actenoides hombroni). The name of the genus is from the Ancient Greek aktis, aktinos for "beam" or "brightness" and -oidēs for "resembling". A molecular study published in 2017 found that the genus Actenoides, as currently defined, is paraphyletic. The glittering kingfisher in the monotypic genus Caridonax is a member of the clade containing the species in the genus Actenoides.

== Species ==
The genus contains the following species:

Genus Actenoides – Bonaparte, 1850 – six species
Common name	Scientific name and subspecies	Range	Size and ecology	IUCN status and estimated population
Green-backed kingfisher Male Female	Actenoides monachus (Bonaparte, 1850) Two subspecies: A. m. monachus - (Bonaparte, 1850); A. m. capucinus - (Meyer, AB & Wiglesworth, 1896)	north and central Sulawesi, and the islands of Manadotua and Lembeh	Size: Habitat: Diet:	NT
Scaly-breasted kingfisher Male Female	Actenoides princeps (Reichenbach, 1851) Three subspecies: A. p. princeps - (Reichenbach, 1851); A. p. erythrorhamphus - (Stresemann, 1931); A. p. regalis - (Stresemann, 1932)	central and southwestern Sulawesi in Indonesia	Size: Habitat: Diet:	LC
Moustached kingfisher	Actenoides bougainvillei (Rothschild, 1904) Two subspecies: A. b. bougainvillei - (Rothschild, 1904); A. b. excelsus - (Mayr, 1941)	Bougainville Island in Papua New Guinea.	Size: Habitat: Diet:	LC
Spotted wood kingfisher Male Female	Actenoides lindsayi (Vigors, 1831) Two subspecies: A. l. lindsayi - Vigors, 1831; A. l. moseleyi - Steere, 1890	the Philippines found on the islands of Luzon, Catanduanes, Marinduque, Negros and Panay	Size: Habitat: Diet:	LC
Blue-capped kingfisher, or Hombron's kingfisher	Actenoides hombroni Bonaparte, 1850	the Philippines (Mindanao).	Size: Habitat: Diet:	VU
Rufous-collared kingfisher	Actenoides concretus (Temminck, 1825) Three subspecies: A. c. peristephes - (Deignan, 1946); A. c. concretus - (Temminck, 1825); A. c. borneanus - (Chasen & Kloss, 1930)	Brunei, Indonesia, Malaysia, Myanmar, and Thailand.	Size: Habitat: Diet:	LC
