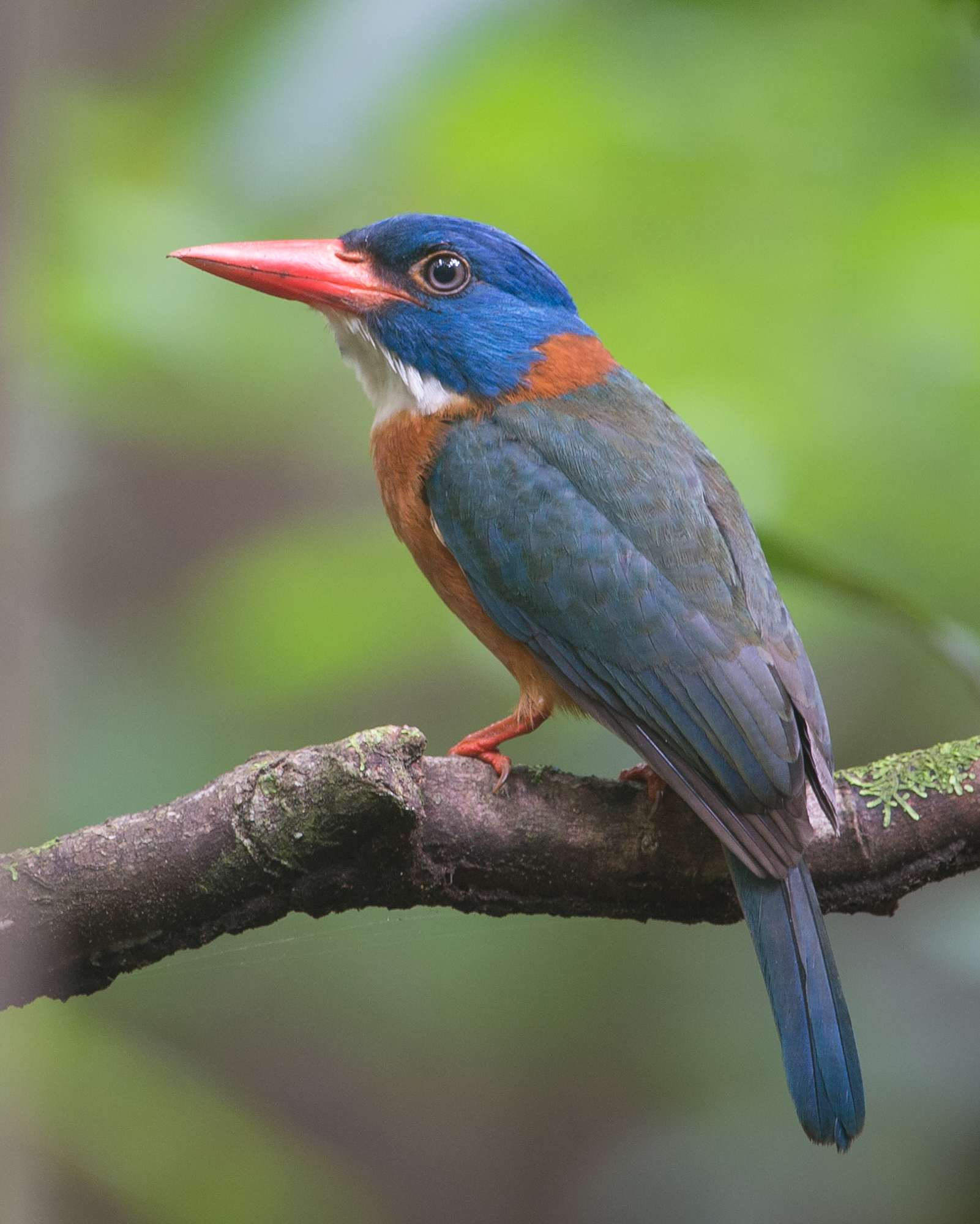
- Male, Tangkoko Batuangus Nature Reserve, North Sulawesi

Conservation status
- Near Threatened (IUCN 3.1)

Scientific classification
- Kingdom: Animalia
- Phylum: Chordata
- Class: Aves
- Order: Coraciiformes
- Family: Alcedinidae
- Subfamily: Halcyoninae
- Genus: Actenoides
- Species: A. monachus

Binomial name
- Actenoides monachus (Bonaparte, 1850)

Subspecies
- A. m. monachus - (Bonaparte, 1850); A. m. capucinus - (Meyer, AB & Wiglesworth, 1896)

= Green-backed kingfisher =

Species of bird

The green-backed kingfisher (Actenoides monachus) is a species of bird in the family Alcedinidae endemic to Indonesia, where it is restricted to north and central Sulawesi, and the islands of Manadotua and Lembeh. It can be found in the protected areas of Lore Lindu, Bogani Nani Wartabone, and Tangkoko Batuangus.

Its natural habitat is dense tropical moist lowland forests up to 900 m elevation. It is threatened by habitat loss by deforestation.

The black-headed kingfisher was previously considered part of this species, but was elevated to species status in 2014.

== Gallery ==
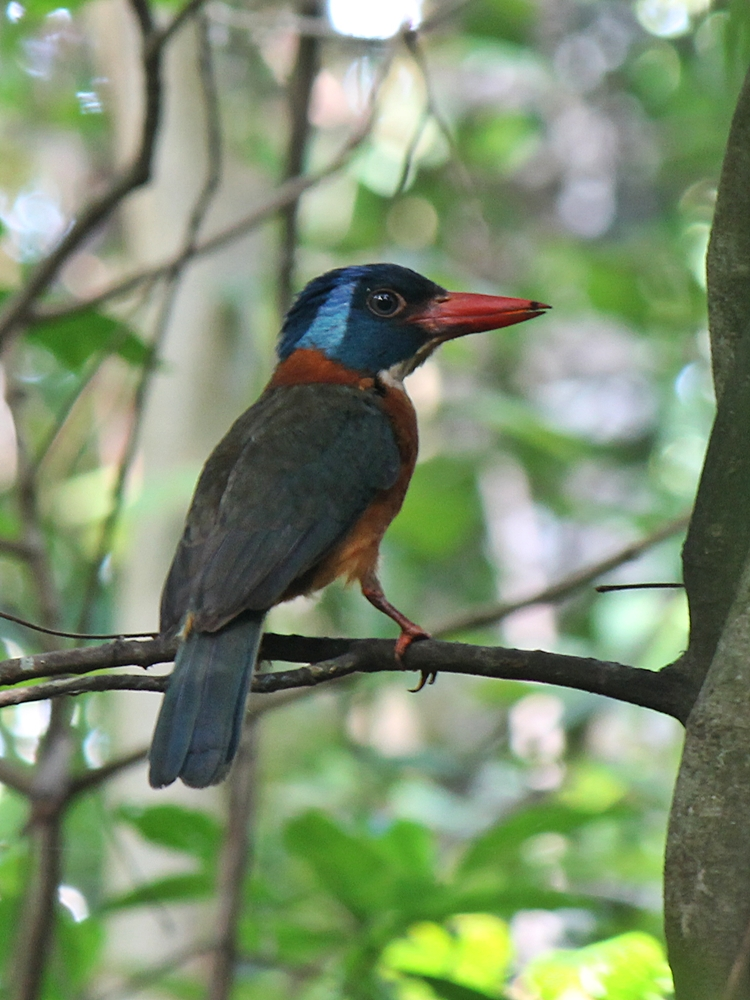
Male A. m. monachus

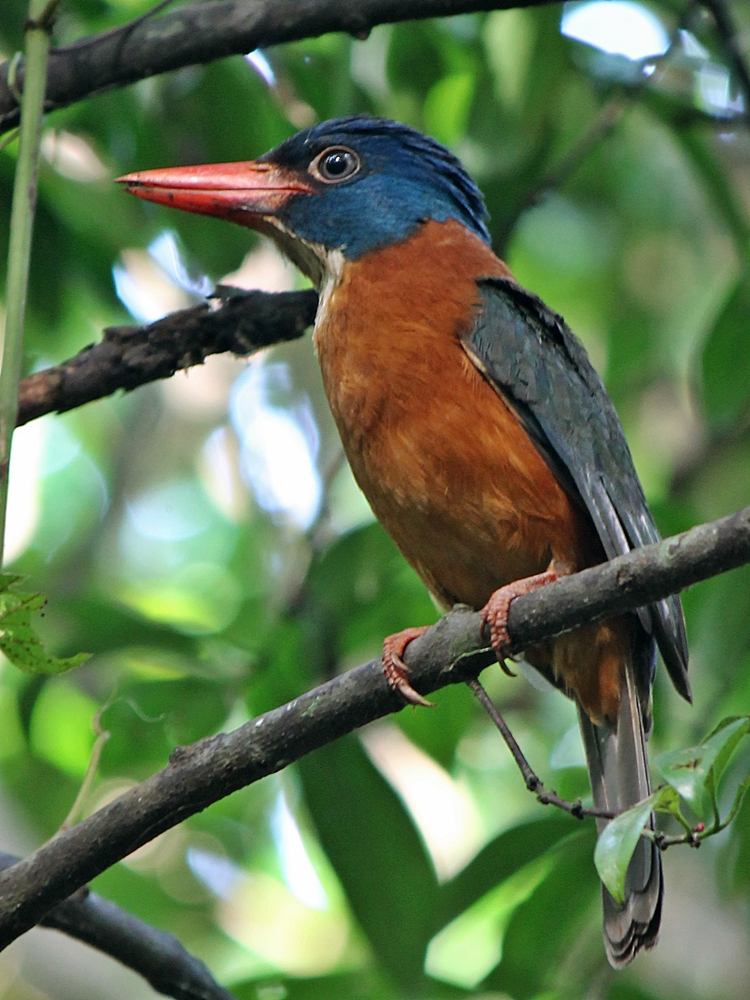
Male A. m. monachus

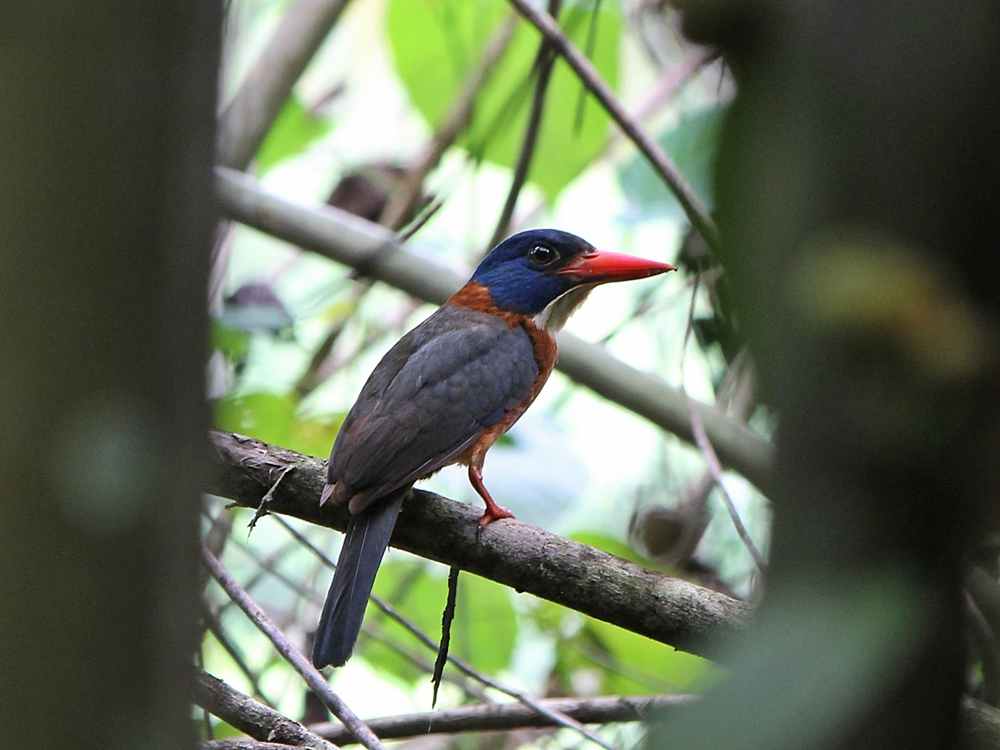
Male A. m. monachus

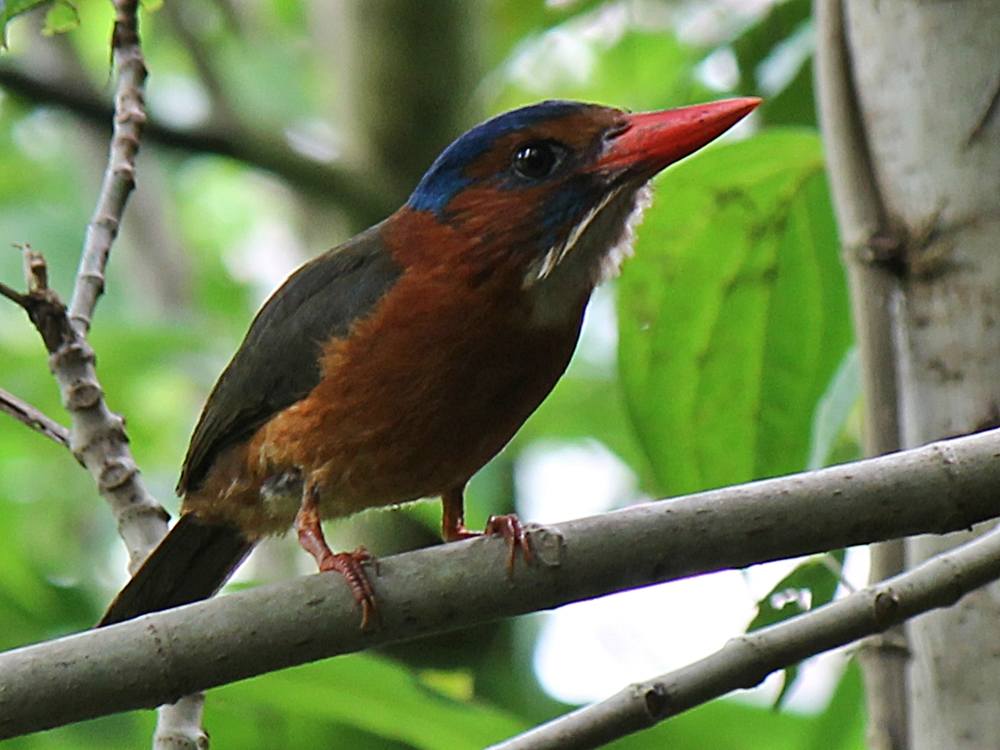
Female A. m. monachus
