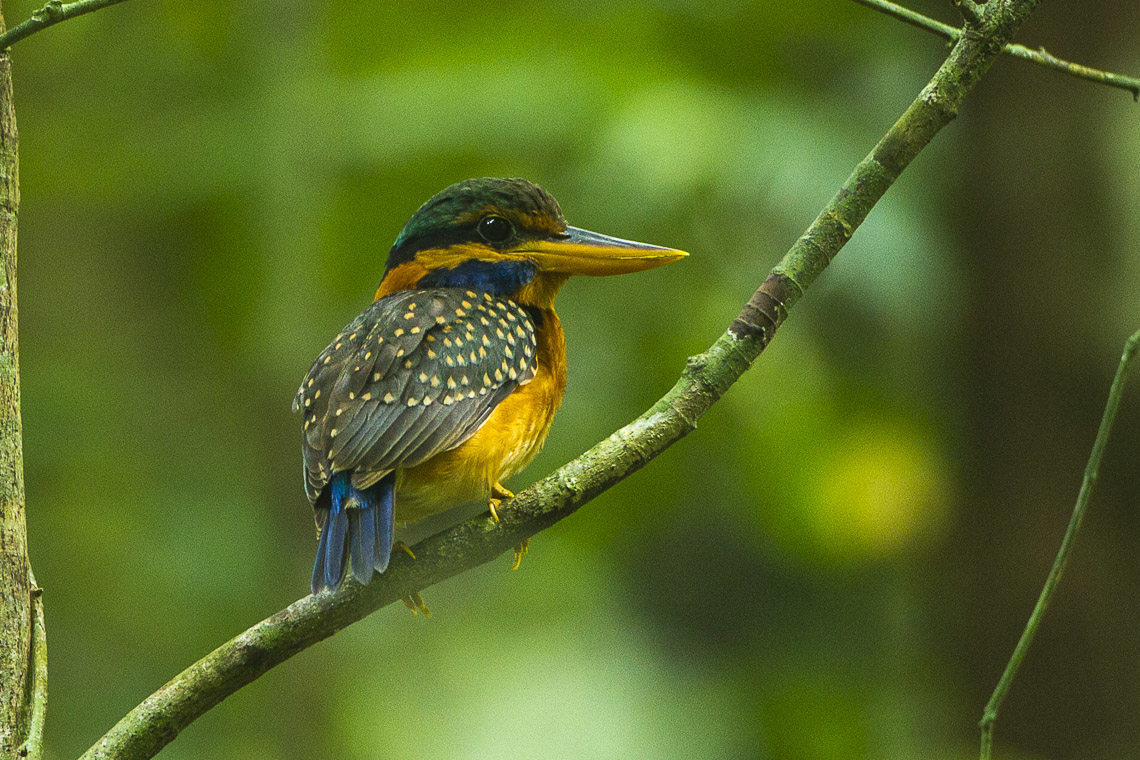

Conservation status
- Near Threatened (IUCN 3.1)

Scientific classification
- Kingdom: Animalia
- Phylum: Chordata
- Class: Aves
- Order: Coraciiformes
- Family: Alcedinidae
- Subfamily: Halcyoninae
- Genus: Actenoides
- Species: A. concretus

Binomial name
- Actenoides concretus (Temminck, 1825)

Subspecies
- A. c. peristephes - (Deignan, 1946); A. c. concretus - (Temminck, 1825); A. c. borneanus - (Chasen & Kloss, 1930)

= Rufous-collared kingfisher =

Species of bird

The rufous-collared kingfisher (Actenoides concretus) is a species of bird in the family Alcedinidae. It is found in Brunei, Indonesia, Malaysia, Myanmar, and Thailand. Its natural habitats are subtropical or tropical moist lowland forest and subtropical or tropical moist montane forest. It is threatened by habitat loss.

This species is 22–25.5 cm (8.7-10.0 inches) long and about 60-90 grams (2.1-3.2 ounces), making it medium-sized among kingfishers. It is mostly blue-green above, with yellow spots on its back. It has a green crown and a black eye mask.

Despite its name, some do not have the rufous breast band. Instead, those individuals have rufous underparts overall.
