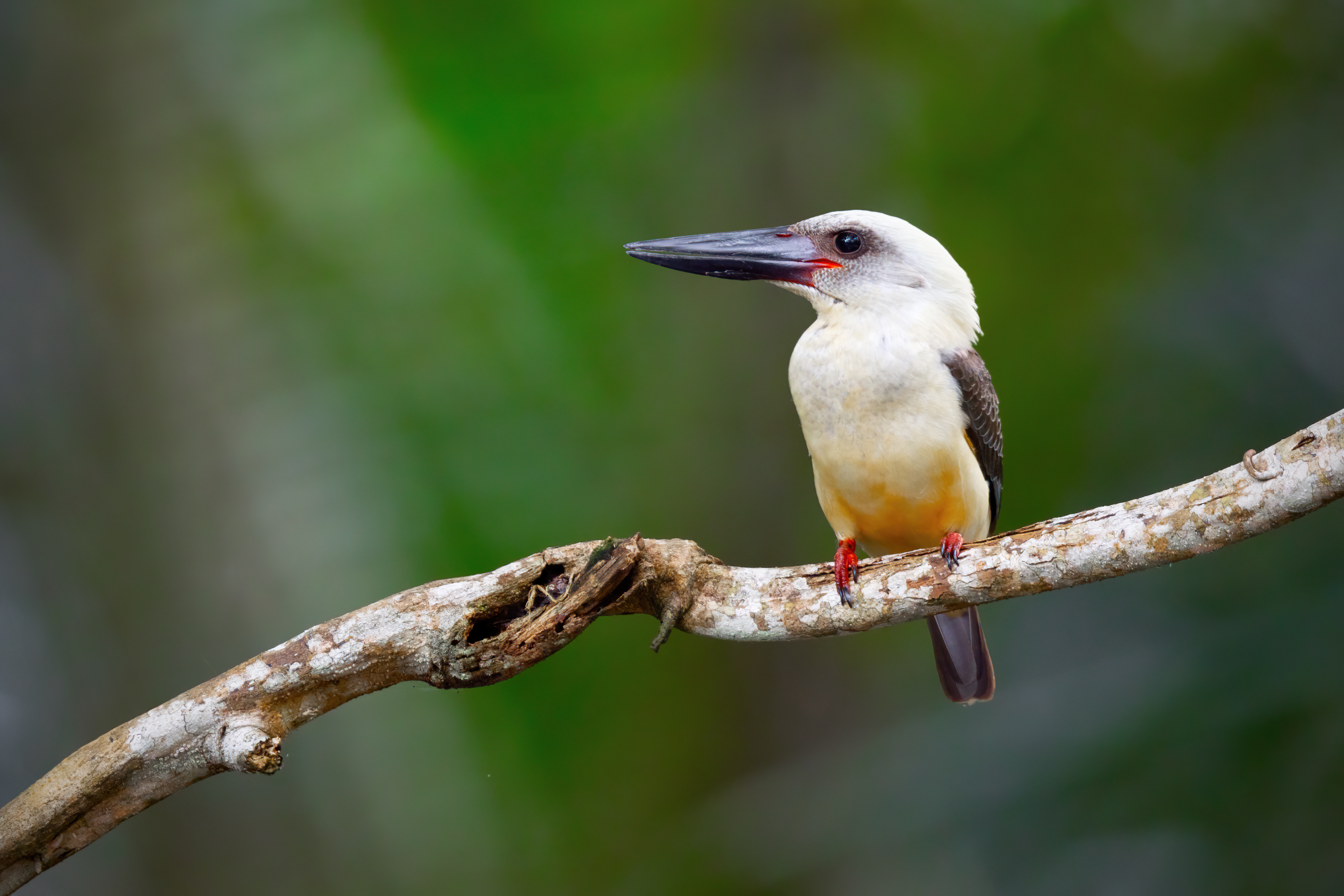

Conservation status
- Least Concern (IUCN 3.1)

Scientific classification
- Kingdom: Animalia
- Phylum: Chordata
- Class: Aves
- Order: Coraciiformes
- Family: Alcedinidae
- Subfamily: Halcyoninae
- Genus: Pelargopsis
- Species: P. melanorhyncha

Binomial name
- Pelargopsis melanorhyncha (Temminck, 1826)

Subspecies
- P. m. melanorhyncha - (Temminck, 1826); P. m. dichrorhyncha - Meyer, AB & Wiglesworth, 1896; P. m. eutreptorhyncha - Hartert, 1898

= Great-billed kingfisher =

Species of bird

The great-billed kingfisher or black-billed kingfisher (Pelargopsis melanorhyncha) is a species of bird in the subfamily Halcyoninae. It is endemic to the Sulawesi region of Indonesia. It can be found on the island of Sulawesi and in the Sula Archipelago.

== Subspecies ==
There are three recognized subspecies:

Pelargopsis melanorhyncha melanorhyncha which is found on the islands of Sulawesi, Bangka, Lembeh, Manadotua, Dodepo, Muna, Butung, Labuandata and in the Togian Islands.

Pelargopsis melanorhyncha dichrorhyncha which is found in the Banggai Islands.

Pelargopsis melanorhyncha eutreptorhyncha which is found in the Sula Islands on Taliabu, Seho, Mangole and Sanana.

== Habitat ==
Its natural habitat is subtropical or tropical mangrove forests.
