= John Thomas Pearson =

British surgeon and museum curator

- Born: 22 August 1801
- Died: 5 March 1851 (aged 49); Barrackpore, West Bengal, India
- Occupation: Surgeon
- Spouse: Frances Fitzpatrick (m. 1827)

John Thomas Pearson (22 August 1801 – 5 March 1851) was a British surgeon who worked in the East India Company in India. He was also briefly the curator of the museum of the Asiatic Society of Bengal.

Pearson received his MRCS in 1825 and became an assistant surgeon in Bengal in 1826 and rose to the rank of surgeon in 1841. While in Darjeeling, he took a keen interest in the local zoology, sending specimens to England for identification. Belomys pearsonii was named after him by his friend from medical student days, J. E. Gray, in 1842. Rhinolophus pearsonii was named after him by Horsfield in 1851.

Pearson was made curator of the Asiatic Society in July 1833 and held the position until 1835 as a favour to James Prinsep. During this period he described the hispid hare and a new species of kingfisher, Pelargopsis amauroptera. This was a period of flux at the Asiatic Society of Bengal and there were complaints from a Dr William Jameson that Pearson had not maintained the museum in order.

He married Frances Fitzpatrick in Calcutta on 7 March 1827. He died at Barrackpur.
