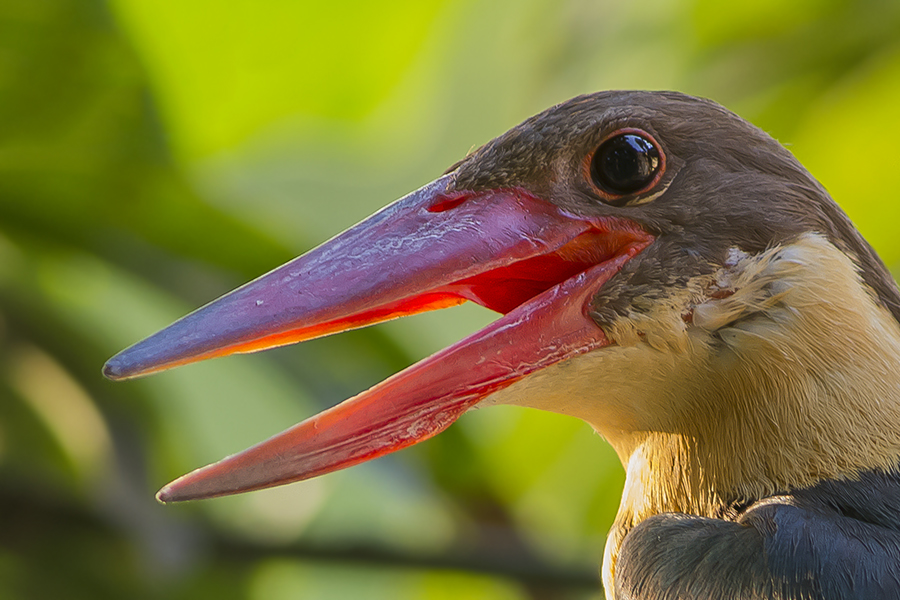
- From Baranagar, India. The shape of its bill resembles that of a stork.

Conservation status
- Least Concern (IUCN 3.1)

Scientific classification
- Kingdom: Animalia
- Phylum: Chordata
- Class: Aves
- Order: Coraciiformes
- Family: Alcedinidae
- Subfamily: Halcyoninae
- Genus: Pelargopsis
- Species: P. capensis

Binomial name
- Pelargopsis capensis (Linnaeus, 1766)

Synonyms
- Alcedo capensis Linnaeus, 1766; Halcyon capensis (Linnaeus, 1766)

= Stork-billed kingfisher =

Species of bird

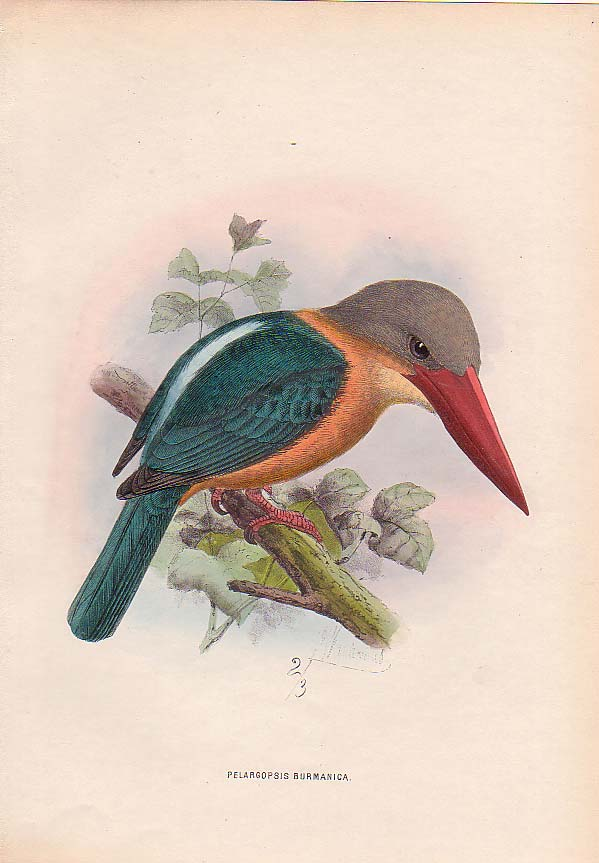
Pelargopsis capensis burmanica by Keulemans

The stork-billed kingfisher (Pelargopsis capensis), is a tree kingfisher which is widely but sparsely distributed in the tropical Indian subcontinent and Southeast Asia, from India to Indonesia. These kingfishers are large and have a heavy bill. The head is brown and the chin is paler coloured. The sexes are similar in coloration. This is found mostly in streams and ponds in lowland areas with tree cover. This kingfisher is sendentary throughout its range.

== Taxonomy ==
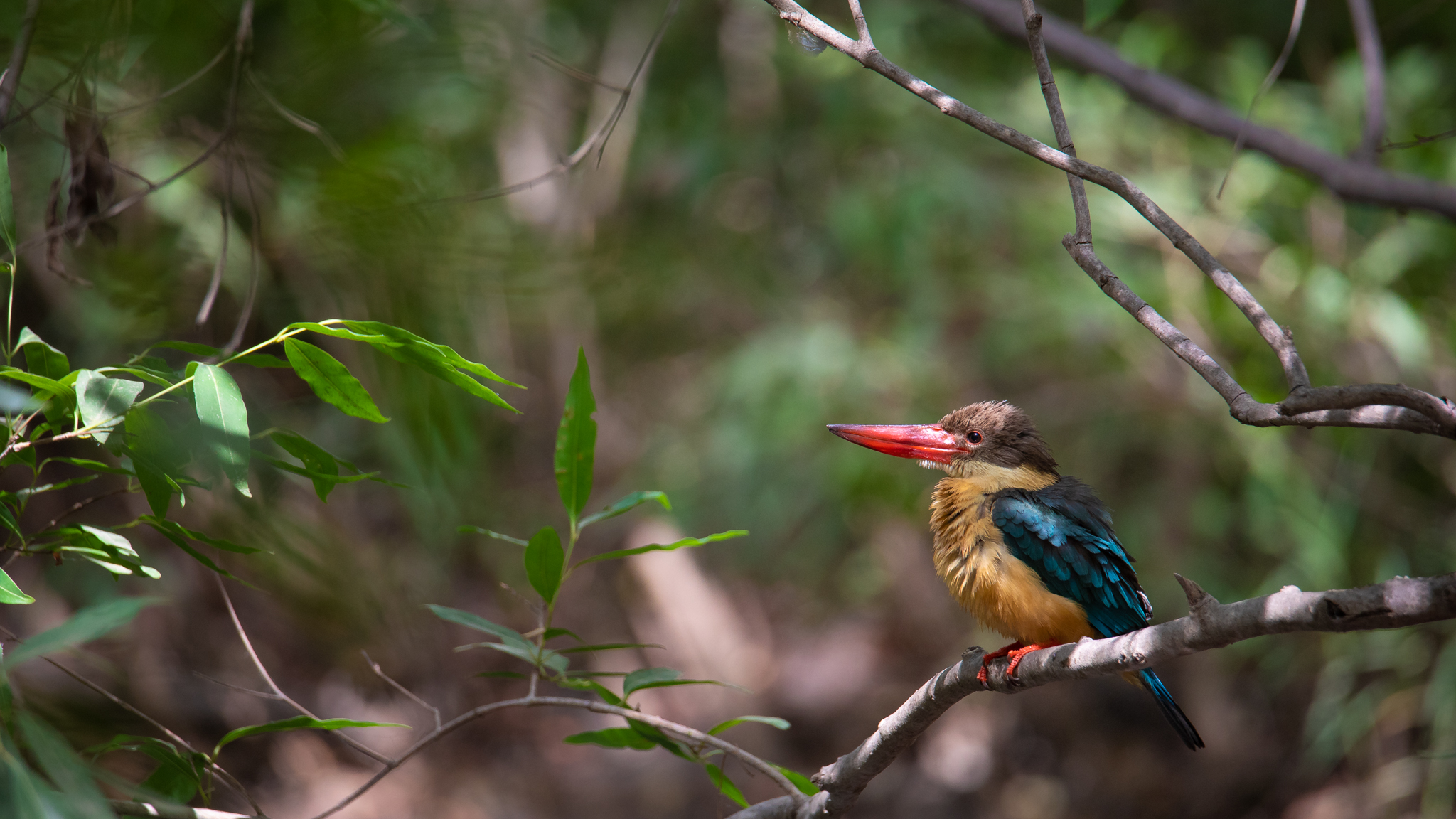
P. c. capensis at Ranthambore National Park

The first formal description of the stork-billed kingfisher was by the Swedish naturalist Carl Linnaeus in 1766 in the 12th edition of his Systema Naturae. He coined the binomial name Alcedo capensis. Linnaeus based his description on Mathurin Jacques Brisson's "Le martin-pescheur du Cap de Bonne Espérance". Brisson believed his specimen had come from the Cape of Good Hope region of South Africa. The species does not occur in Africa and it was suggested that the specimen had been obtained on the Indonesian island of Java. The specimen is now known to have come from near Chandannagar in West Bengal, India. Linnaeus's specific epithet capensis denotes the Cape of Good Hope. The current genus Pelargopsis was introduced by the German zoologist Constantin Gloger in 1841.

Thirteen subspecies are recognised:

- P. c. capensis (Linnaeus, 1766) – Nepal through India to Sri Lanka
- P. c. osmastoni (Baker, ECS, 1934) – Andaman Islands
- P. c. intermedia Hume, 1874 – Nicobar Islands
- P. c. burmanica Sharpe, 1870 – Myanmar to Indochina and south to north Malay Peninsula
- P. c. malaccensis Sharpe, 1870 – central and south Malay Peninsula, Riau Archipelago and Lingga Islands
- P. c. cyanopteryx (Oberholser, 1909) – Sumatra, Bangka Island and Belitung Island
- P. c. simalurensis Richmond, 1903 – Simeulue Island (off the west coast of the island of Sumatra in Indonesia)
- P. c. sodalis Richmond, 1903 – Banyak, Nias, Batu and Mentawai Islands (off the west coast of Sumatra)
- P. c. innominata (van Oort, 1910) – Borneo
- P. c. javana (Boddaert, 1783) – Java
- P. c. floresiana Sharpe, 1870 – Bali to Flores (Lesser Sunda Islands)
- P. c. gouldi Sharpe, 1870 – north Philippines
- P. c. gigantea Walden, 1874 – central and south Philippines

The insular forms nesoeca on the Nias and Batu Islands as well as isoptera on Mentawai Island are here subsumed within sodalis. Prior to the change of type locality to Chandannagar, the birds in India were placed in the subspecies gurial but this race is now synonymized with the nominate race capensis.

== Description ==
It is a very large kingfisher, measuring 35 cm (14 in) in length. The adult has a green back, blue wings and tail, and olive-brown head. Its underparts and neck are buff. The very large bill and legs are bright red. The flight of the stork-billed kingfisher is laboured and flapping, but direct. Sexes are similar. There are 13 races or subspecies, differing mostly in plumage detail, but P. c. gigantea of the Sulu Archipelago in the Philippines has a white head, neck and underparts.

== Habits ==
The stork-billed kingfisher lives in a variety of well-wooded habitats near lakes, rivers, or coasts. It perches quietly whilst seeking food, and is often inconspicuous despite its size. It is territorial and will chase away eagles and other large predators. This species hunts fish, frogs, crabs, rodents and young birds. They were also recorded feeding on fruits.

They are largely sedentary but capable of dispersal and may move in search of water during dry weather.

Adults dig their nests in river banks, decaying trees, or tree termite nests. Both members of the pair take part in next excavation. They initially strike the soil in flight to loosen soil and after creating a perch they cling and peck to excavate the hole. A clutch of two to five round white eggs is typical. The eggs are about 34 to 39 mm long and about 29 to 32 mm wide.

The call of this noisy kingfisher is a low and far reaching peer-por-por repeated about every 5 seconds, as well cackling ke-ke-ke-ke-ke-ke.

== Gallery ==
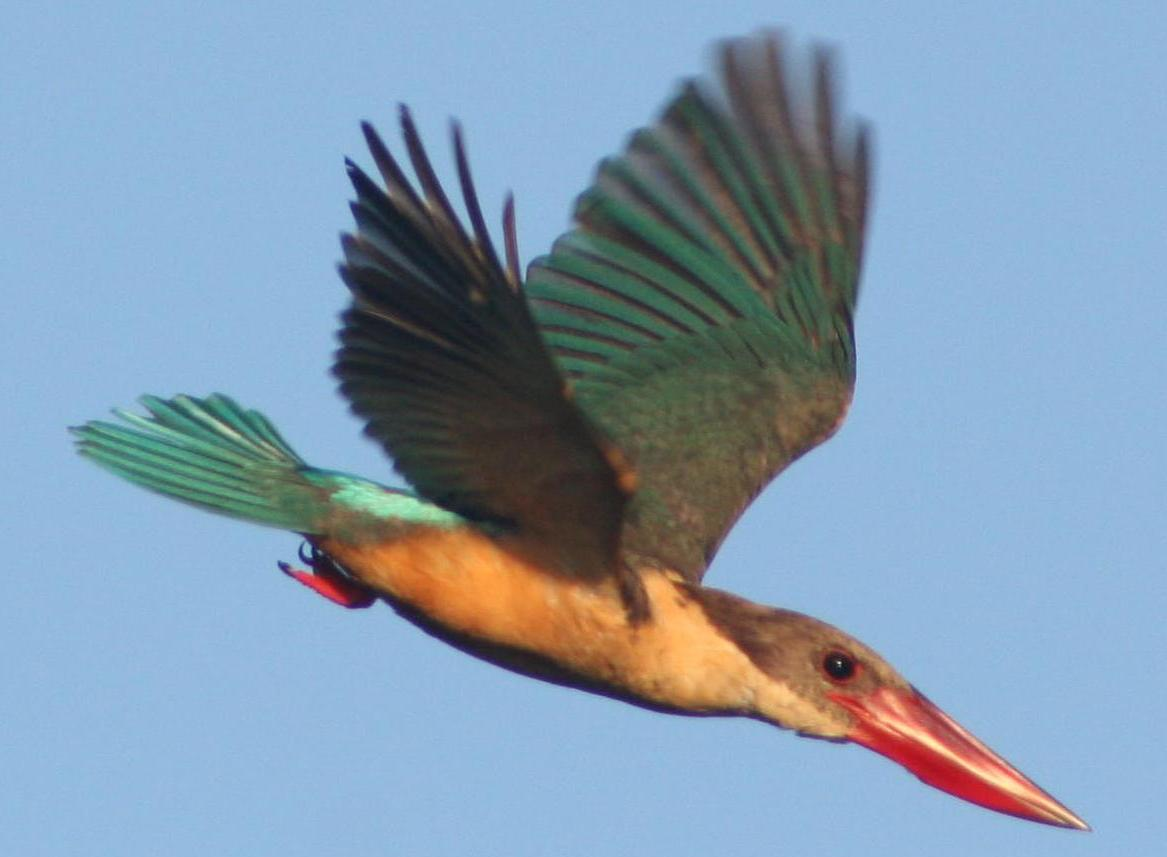
In Kumarakom, Kerala, India.

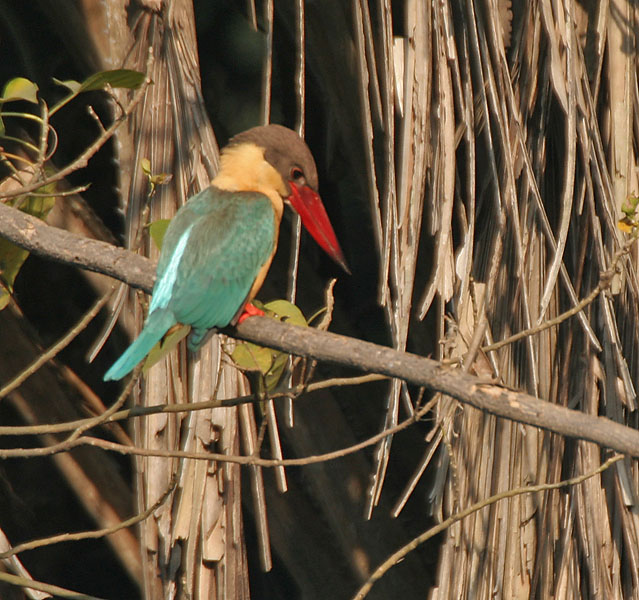
Eyeing prey in Kolkata, West Bengal, India.

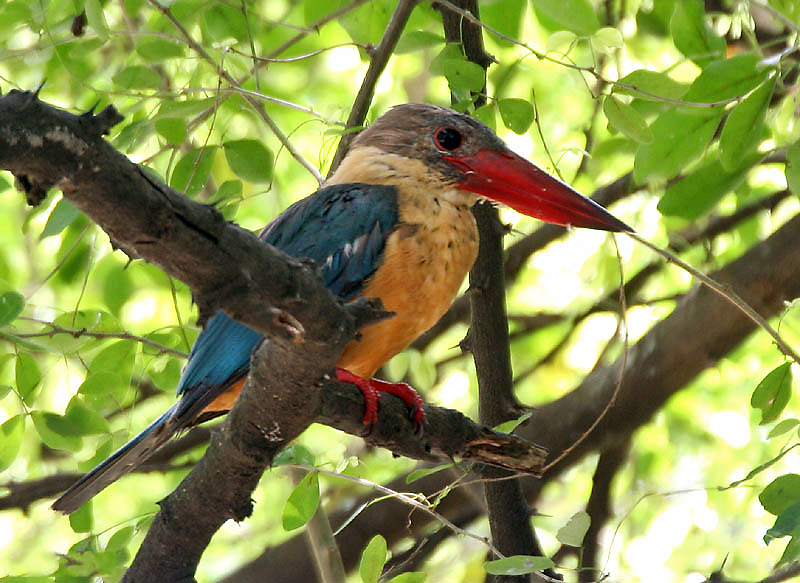
In Kolkata, West Bengal, India.

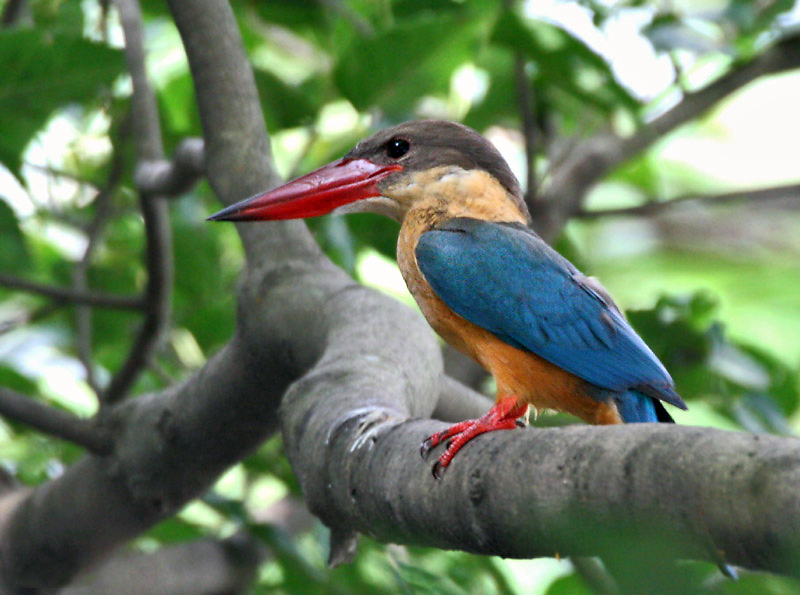
In Kolkata, West Bengal, India.

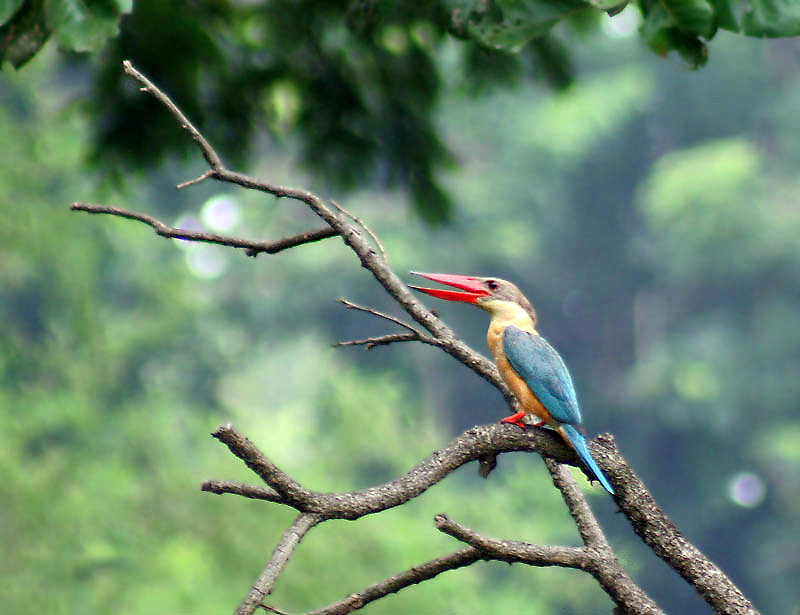
In Kolkata, West Bengal, India.

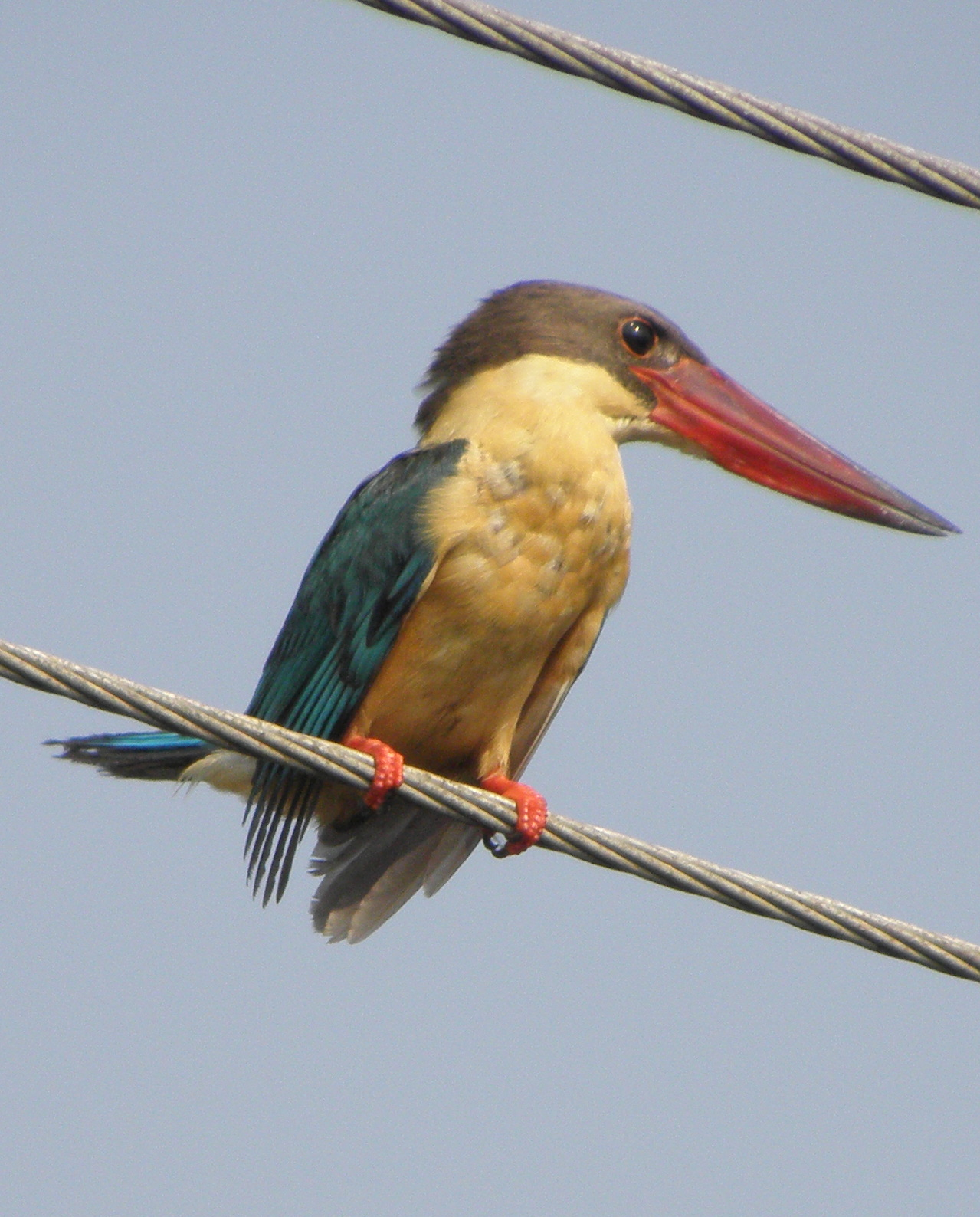
Stork-billed Kingfisher

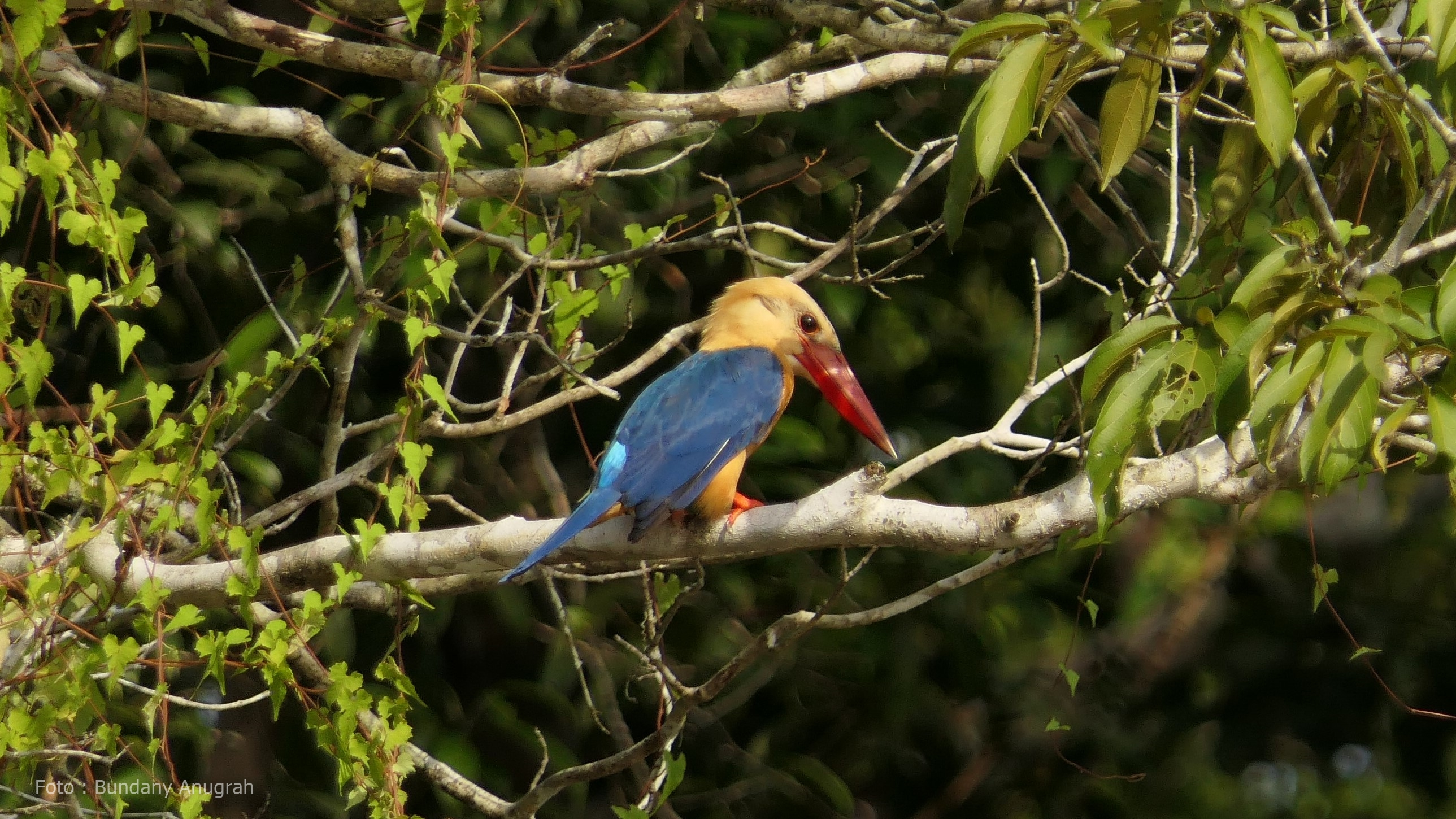
Lake Sentarum National Park, Indonesia

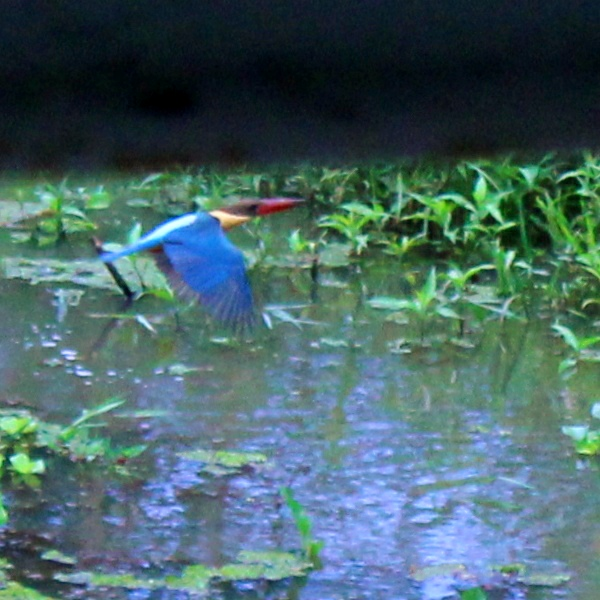
A Stork-billed Kingfisher with blue plumage in central Kerala.

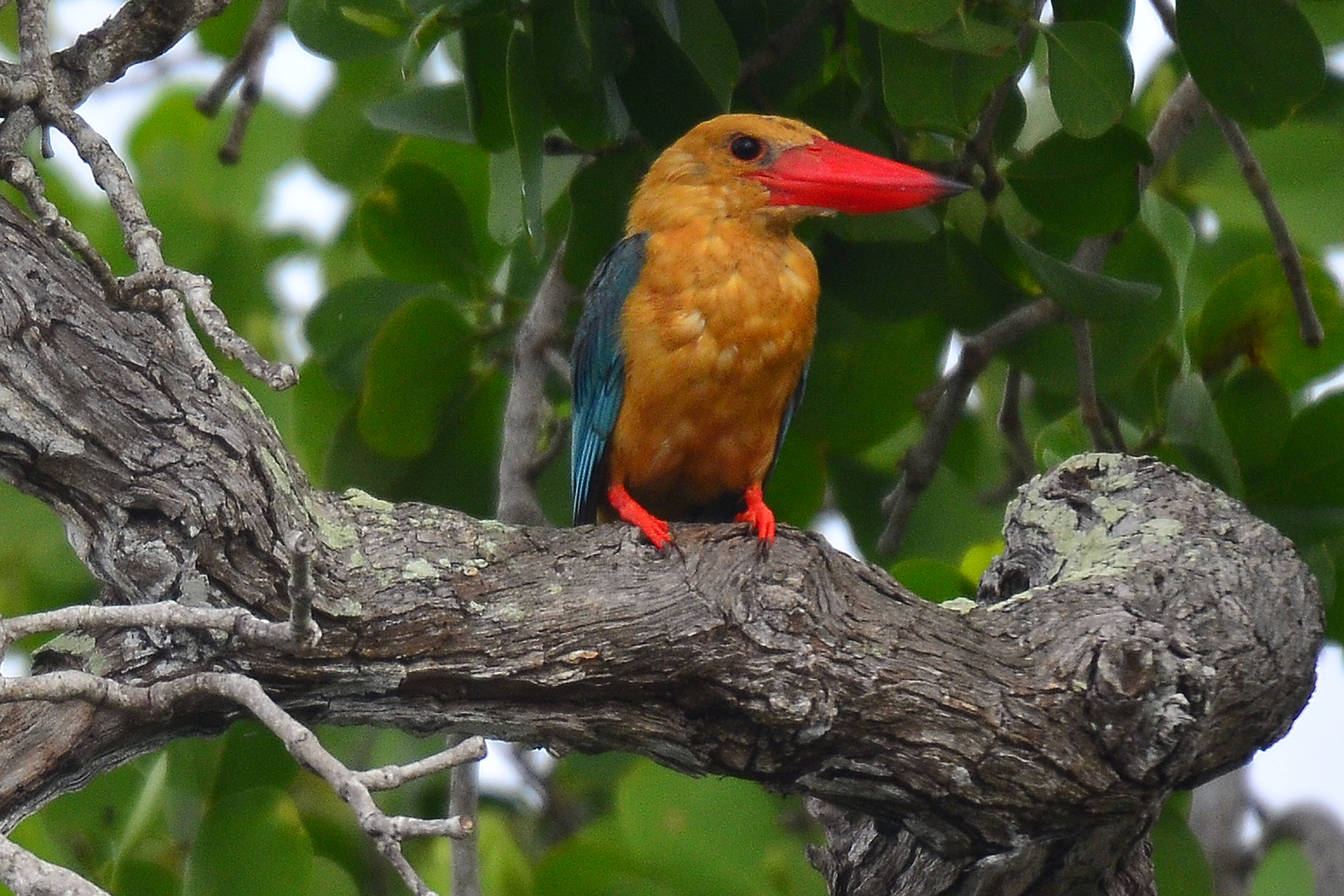
P. c. gouldi
