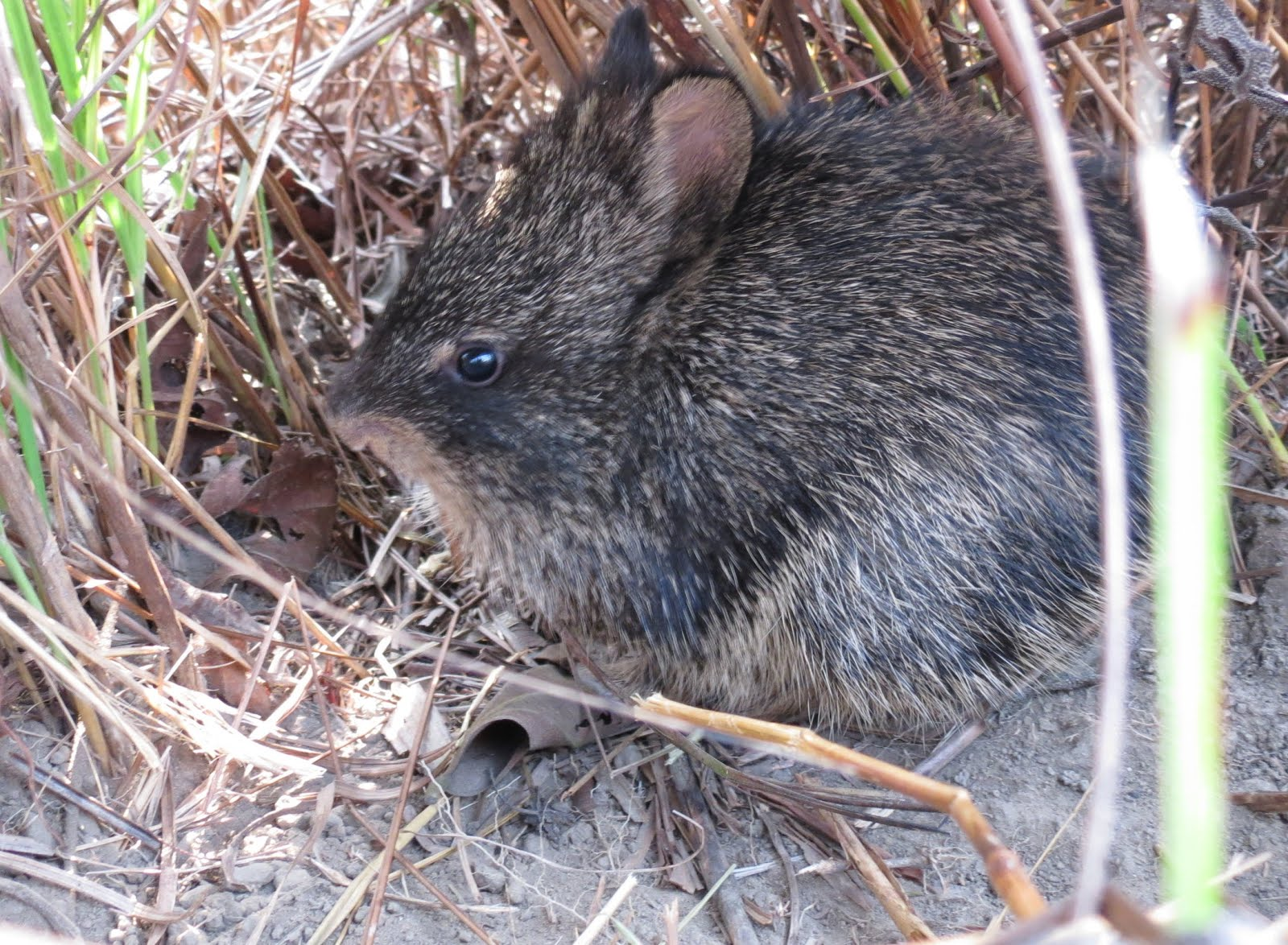
- Chitwan National Park, Nepal

Conservation status
- Endangered (IUCN 3.1)
- CITES Appendix I

Scientific classification
- Kingdom: Animalia
- Phylum: Chordata
- Class: Mammalia
- Infraclass: Placentalia
- Order: Lagomorpha
- Family: Leporidae
- Genus: Caprolagus; Blyth, 1845
- Species: C. hispidus

Binomial name
- Caprolagus hispidus (J. T. Pearson in Horsfield, 1840)
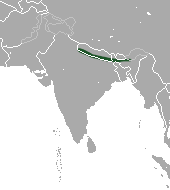
- Hispid hare range

Synonyms
- Lepus hispidus J. T. Pearson in Horsfield, 1840

= Hispid hare =

Species of mammal

The hispid hare (Caprolagus hispidus), also known as the Assam rabbit and bristly rabbit, is a species of rabbit native to South Asia. It is the only species in the genus Caprolagus. Named for its bristly fur coat, the hispid hare is a rabbit with dark-brown fur and a large nose. It has small ears compared to the Indian hare, a lagomorph that occurs in the same regions as the hispid hare.

Once thought to be extinct, the hispid hare was rediscovered in Assam in 1971 and has been found in isolated populations across India, Nepal, and Bangladesh. Its historic range extended along the southern foothills of the Himalayas, and a related fossil in the genus Caprolagus has been found as far away as Indonesia. Today, the species' habitat is much smaller and is highly fragmented. The region it occupies is estimated to be less than 500 square kilometres (190 sq mi), extending over an area of 5,000 to 20,000 square kilometres (1,900 to 7,700 sq mi). Populations experienced a continuing decline due to loss of suitable habitat via increasing agriculture, flood control, and human development, particularly burning and collection of thatch grasses. It has been listed as Endangered on the IUCN Red List since 1986. The rabbit is known to occur in several national parks. Breeding in captivity has been described as "very difficult". Conservation efforts focus on community education and further study.

== Taxonomy and etymology ==
The hispid hare was placed in the genus Lepus, the hares, on its first description by the British surgeon John Thomas Pearson in 1839, where it was given the scientific name Lepus hispidus. This description was first published in the Calcutta Sporting Magazine, but the first formal account was published by Thomas Horsfield a year later in the Proceedings of the Zoological Society. Pearson noted that the ears of the hispid hare were "so short as not to extend past the fur on its head", but later authors assumed this to be a mistake. The species name hispidus, as well as the common name "hispid hare", refers to the coarseness of the fur as the term describes something as being rough or covered in stiff hairs. English zoologist Edward Blyth gave the hispid hare a distinct genus, Caprolagus, in 1845 due to its unusual morphology, though he did not provide a reasoning for the name chosen. He noted in particular the rough fur (unusual for a hare or rabbit), large and robust skull, diminished eyes and whiskers, strong claws, and equally-proportioned limbs. Later studies in the 21st century confirmed its place as the only species within its genus; the closely related extinct species †Pliosiwalagus sivalensis was once considered to be a member of Caprolagus, but was reclassified in 2002. The type specimen of the hispid hare was taken from the "base of the Boutan [= Bhutan] mountains" in Assam, India, and was described by Blyth in his 1845 description of the new genus, but it is unclear if this specimen exists in any collection today.

Several fossil species have been described that belong in the genus Caprolagus. C. netscheri was described by German zoologist Hermann Schlegel in 1880, but this species was later reclassified as the living Sumatran striped rabbit. Swiss zoologist Charles Immanuel Forsyth Major described the species †C. sivalensis in 1899 based on specimens found in the Sivalik Hills, but this species was later placed in the genus Pliosiwalagus. Chinese paleontologist Yang Zhongjian described another species, †C. brachypus, in 1927. However, several later authors disagreed on the placement of this species; it is no longer regarded as a member of Caprolagus, and has been regarded as belonging in the genera Alilepus, Hypolagus, and currently Sericolagus. Fossils of one extinct species, †C. lapis, which was described by Dutch paleontologist Dirk Albert Hooijer in 1964 and is thought to have lived in Indonesia, may date back 3.6 million years and is the only current fossil Caprolagus. No fossils are known that are assigned to the living hispid hare, C. hispidus, but one specimen was found in 2011 from the Pothohar Plateau that may correspond to it or the genera Pliopentalagus or Pliosiwalagus.

No subspecies of the hispid hare are known. The following cladogram shows the relationships between Caprolagus, other rabbits, and hares, based on a phylogenetic tree from Leandro Iraçabal and colleagues published in 2024:

Leporid phylogeny minus rogue taxa with insufficient information (Bunolagus, Oryctolagus, some species in Sylvilagus)

- - - Lepus
    - - Sylvilagus
      - - Caprolagus
        - Pentalagus
  - Romerolagus
- - - Pronolagus
    - Poelagus
  - Nesolagus

== Description ==
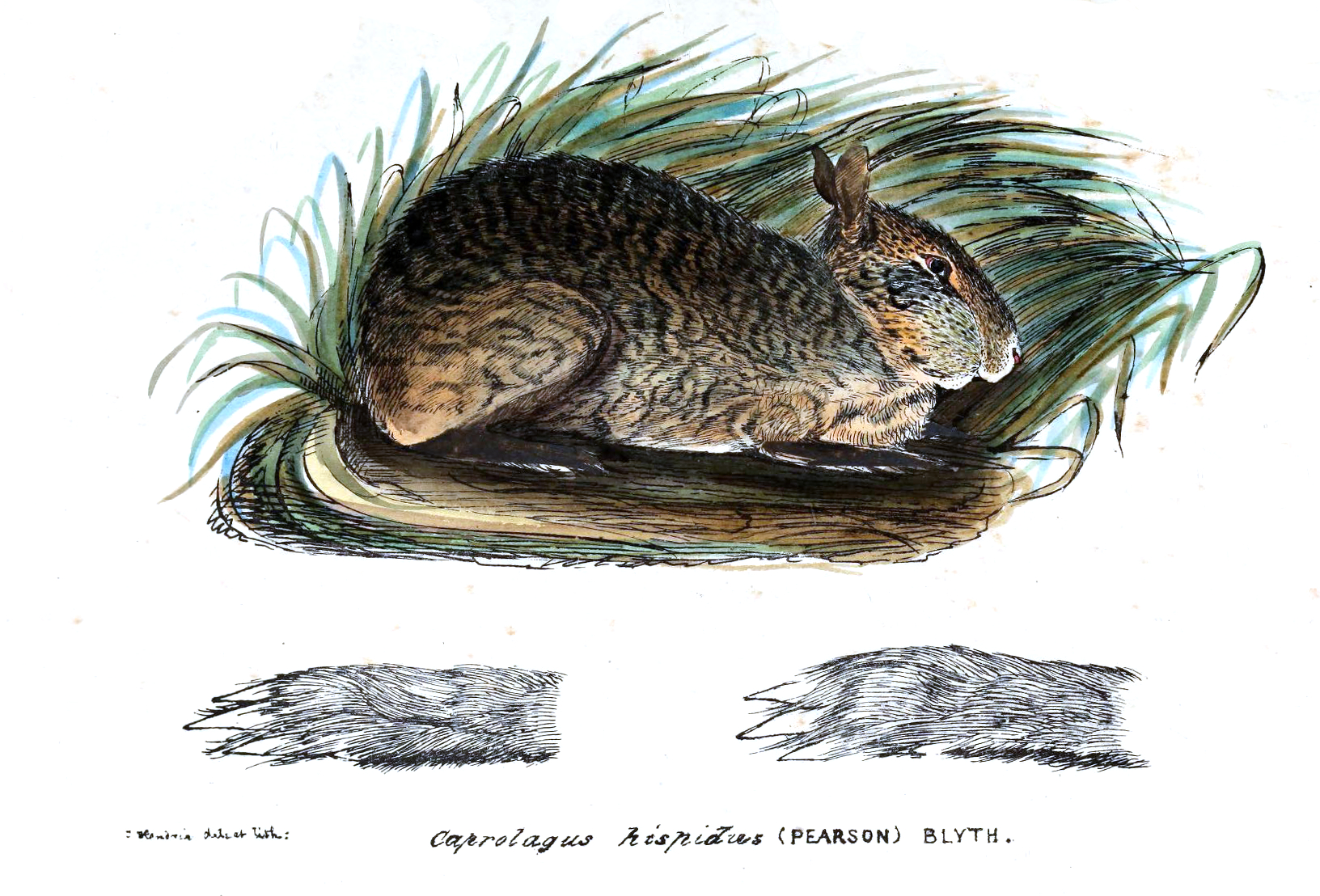
1845 illustration by J. Hendrie

The hispid hare has a harsh and bristly fur coat. The coat is dark brown on the back due to a mixture of black and brown hairs; brown on the chest and whitish on the abdomen. The tail is brown and ranges from 25 to 38 millimetres (0.98 to 1.50 inches) long. The ears of the adult are 54 to 61 mm (2.1 to 2.4 in) long. In body weight, males range from 1,810 to 2,610 grams (64 to 92 ounces) with a mean of 2,248 g (79.3 oz). Females weigh on average 2,518 g (88.8 oz); a heavily pregnant female weighing 3,210 g (113 oz) was included in this average.

In terms of its skeletal features, the frontal bones of the hispid hare are very wide. There is no clear notch in front of the postorbital processes (bone structures above the eye sockets). At its greatest length, the skull has been measured to be 76 millimetres (3.0 in).

Compared to other lagomorphs, the hispid hare has a very large nose. Its short ears and completely brown tail can be used as indicators to distinguish it from the rufous-tailed hare (Lepus nigricollis ruficaudatus), a subspecies of the Indian hare that occupies the same regions as the hispid hare but has longer ears and a white underside on its tail.

== Distribution and habitat ==
The historical range of the hispid hare extended from Uttar Pradesh through southern Nepal, the northern region of West Bengal to Assam and into Bangladesh. Today, its distribution is considered to be limited to northern India, southern Nepal, and eastern Bhutan. Its presence in Kanha National Park in Madhya Pradesh is only known from fecal pellet analysis, and has not been confirmed by any sightings. It was also thought to occur in D'Ering Memorial Wildlife Sanctuary in Arunachal Pradesh, but little evidence of the hispid hare has been found, with the Indian hare being more common in the area.

The hispid hare lives in successional tall grasslands—regions dominated by elephant grass—which provide cover and food. These grassland habitats are highly fragmented. It takes refuge in marshy areas or grasses adjacent to river banks during the dry season, when grassy areas are susceptible to burning. However, populations that take shelter near rivers are threatened by flooding during a monsoon, and the species tends towards dry grasslands more than wet regions with dense grasses.

== Behavior and ecology ==
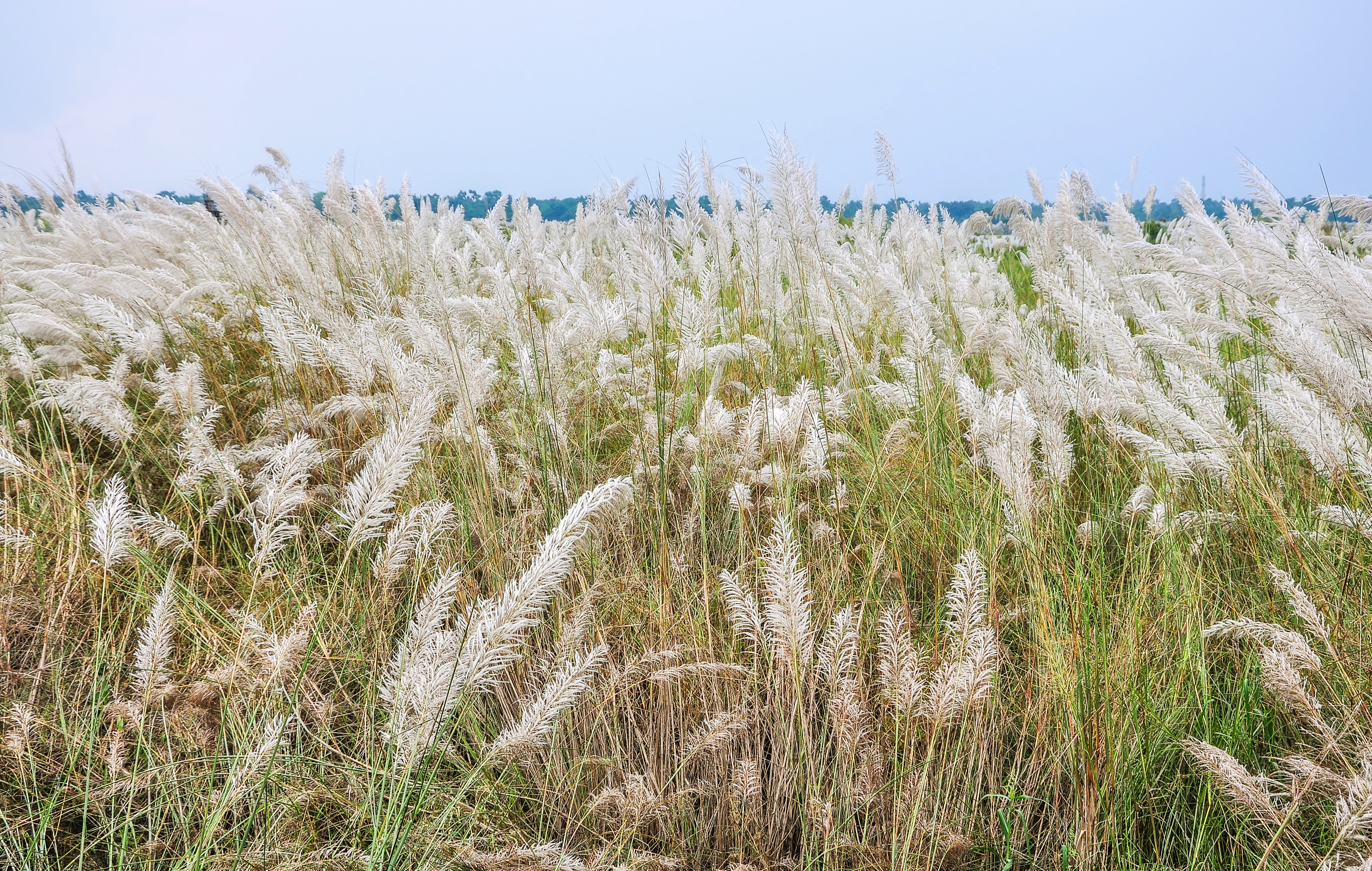
The hispid hare feeds upon various grasses, including the widespread kans grass (Saccharum spontaneum).

The hispid hare is crepuscular, being most active at dawn and dusk. Its average litter size is small, with each litter producing two to three young. Gestation lasts 40 days, and on average 3 litters are produced annually. It is sympatric with the pygmy hog, a biological indicator for the health of its habitat. The hispid hare's predators include birds of prey, cats, civets, jackals, weasels, and foxes. It maintains a relatively small home range of .0042 square kilometres (0.0016 sq mi) on average. The home ranges of male and female rabbits may overlap; females have smaller home ranges than those of males.

The hispid hare is herbivorous, and eats grasses and leaves within its habitat. It prefers kans grass, cogongrass, Saccharum narenga, and grasses in the genus Narenga, depending on the availability of each. At least 23 different plant species are eaten by the hispid hare, including the grasses Desmostachya bipinnata and Cynodon dactylon. When feeding on the shoots and roots of plants used for thatching, the hispid hare breaks the plant at its base and strips its outer sheath before consumption. Hispid hares likely obtain much of their water through consuming grasses, which during cold seasons can have a water content of over 60%.

== Conservation ==
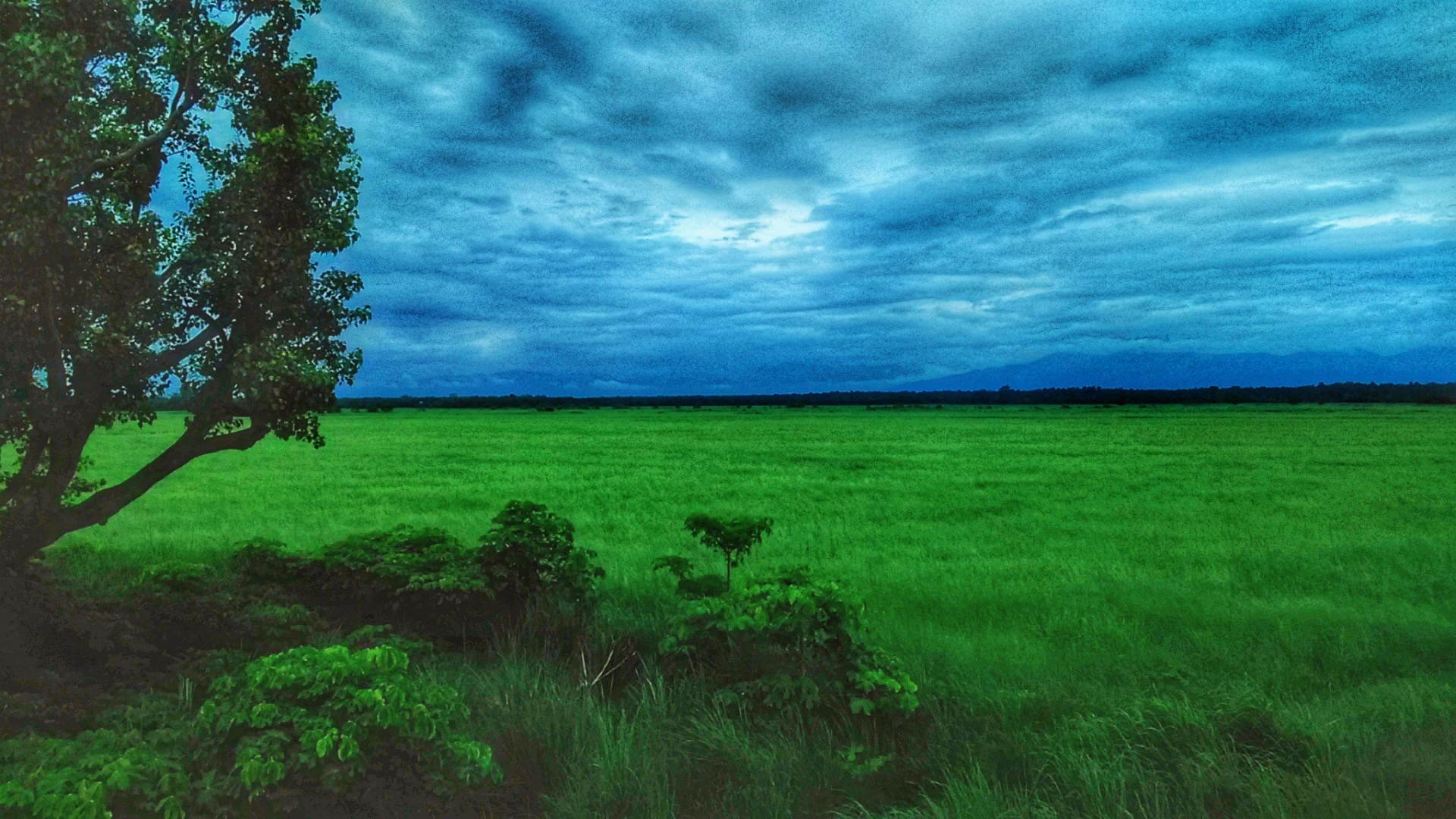
Shuklaphanta National Park, a protected area where the hispid hare is known to occur

Grassland habitats of the hispid hare are threatened due to overgrazing by cattle. Additionally, the hispid hare is threatened by the cutting and burning of vegetation in its habitat. The species' preference for dry ground and less dense grass leads to activity and population declines in periods of high rainfall and intense vegetation succession or growth. Grassland burning is significantly more threatening to the species during the breeding season. Changes to the grassland habitat in the Terai Arc Landscape due to burning, succession, habitat fragmentation and collection of grasses for thatch has been especially detrimental to herbivores in the region, including the hispid hare. Thatch harvesting has also been noted as an unsustainable and habitat-damaging practice in the hispid hare-inhabited Manas National Park.

The hispid hare is known to occur in several protected areas. Prior to its rediscovery in Bornadi Wildlife Sanctuary alongside the pygmy hog in 1971, it was thought to be extinct. Sightings of the rabbit have occurred sporadically since then across its distribution, though the population is in decline due to habitat loss. The hispid hare is known to be present in the grasslands of Shuklaphanta National Park based on pellet records, but its population density is very low (from 0.182 to 0.221 individuals per hectare), comparable only with that of Jaldapara Wildlife Sanctuary (0.087 per hectare). In January 2016, a hispid hare was recorded in Chitwan National Park for the first time since 1984. Development of controlled burning systems that do not overlap with the breeding season of the hispid hare has been recommended as a potential conservation measure. Additionally, recommendations have been made to continue studying the distribution and ecological significance of the species and to educate communities on its endangered status. Efforts to breed the hispid hare in captivity have been described as "very difficult".
