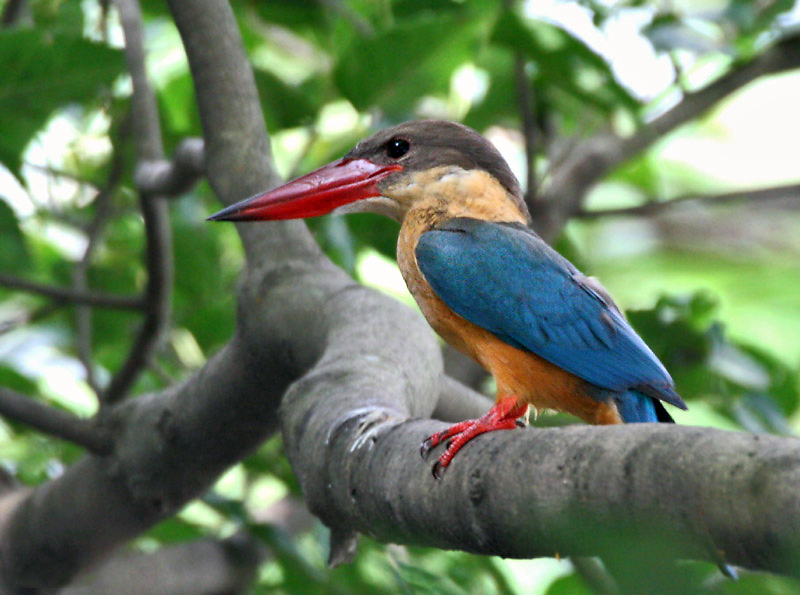
- Stork-billed kingfisher Pelargopsis capensis

Scientific classification
- Kingdom: Animalia
- Phylum: Chordata
- Class: Aves
- Order: Coraciiformes
- Family: Alcedinidae
- Subfamily: Halcyoninae
- Genus: Pelargopsis; Gloger, 1841

Type species
- Alcedo javana Boddaert, 1783

Species
- See text

= Pelargopsis =

Genus of birds

"Pelargopsis" was also invalidly given to Pelargopappus, a genus of fossil secretarybirds.

Phylogeny

- Pelargopsis
  - Brown-winged kingfisher
  - - Great-billed kingfisher
    - Stork-billed kingfisher

Cladogram based on Andersen et al. (2017)

Pelargopsis is a genus of tree kingfishers that are resident in tropical south Asia from India and Sri Lanka to Indonesia.

The genus was introduced by the German zoologist Constantin Gloger in 1841. The type species is a subspecies of the stork-billed kingfisher Pelargopsis capensis javana. The word Pelargopsis is derived from the classical Greek pelargos meaning "stork" and opsis meaning "appearance".

== Species ==
The genus contains three species:

Genus Pelargopsis – Gloger, 1841 – two species
Common name	Scientific name and subspecies	Range	Size and ecology	IUCN status and estimated population
Stork-billed kingfisher	Pelargopsis capensis (Linnaeus, 1766) Thirteen subspecies: P. c. capensis (Linnaeus, 1766); P. c. osmastoni (Baker, ECS, 1934); P. c. intermedia Hume, 1874; P. c. burmanica Sharpe, 1870; P. c. malaccensis Sharpe, 1870; P. c. cyanopteryx (Oberholser, 1909); P. c. simalurensis Richmond, 1903; P. c. sodalis Richmond, 1903; P. c. innominata (van Oort, 1910); P. c. javana (Boddaert, 1783); P. c. floresiana Sharpe, 1870; P. c. gouldi Sharpe, 1870; P. c. gigantea Walden, 1874	Southeast Asia and Indian Subcontinent	Size: Habitat: Diet:	LC
Great-billed kingfisher, black-billed kingfisher or Celebes stork-billed kingfisher	Pelargopsis melanorhyncha (Temminck, 1826) Three subspecies: P. m. melanorhyncha - (Temminck, 1826); P. m. dichrorhyncha - Meyer, AB & Wiglesworth, 1896; P. m. eutreptorhyncha - Hartert, 1898	Sulawesi region of Indonesia	Size: Habitat: Diet:	LC
Brown-winged kingfisher	Pelargopsis amauroptera (Pearson, JT, 1841)	Bangladesh, India, Malaysia, Myanmar and Thailand	Size: Habitat: Diet:	NT

These three kingfishers were previously placed in the genus Halcyon.

These are large kingfishers, 35 cm (14 in) in length. They have very large red or black bills and bright red legs. The head and underparts of these species are white or buff, and the wings and back are darker, coloured variously in green and blue, brown or black depending on species. The sexes are similar. The flight of the Pelargopsis kingfishers is flapping, but direct.

Pelargopsis kingfishers inhabit a variety of well-wooded habitats near lakes, rivers, estuaries or coasts. They perch quietly whilst seeking food, and are often inconspicuous despite their size. They are territorial and will chase away eagles and other large predators. These species hunts crabs, fish, frogs, and in the case of stork-billed at least, rodents and young birds.

Pelargopsis kingfishers excavate their nests in a river bank, decaying tree, or a tree termite nest and lay round white eggs.

== Sources ==
- Fry, C. Hilary; Fry, Kathie; Harris, Alan (1992). Kingfishers, Bee-eaters, and Rollers. London: Christopher Helm. ISBN 978-0-7136-8028-7.
