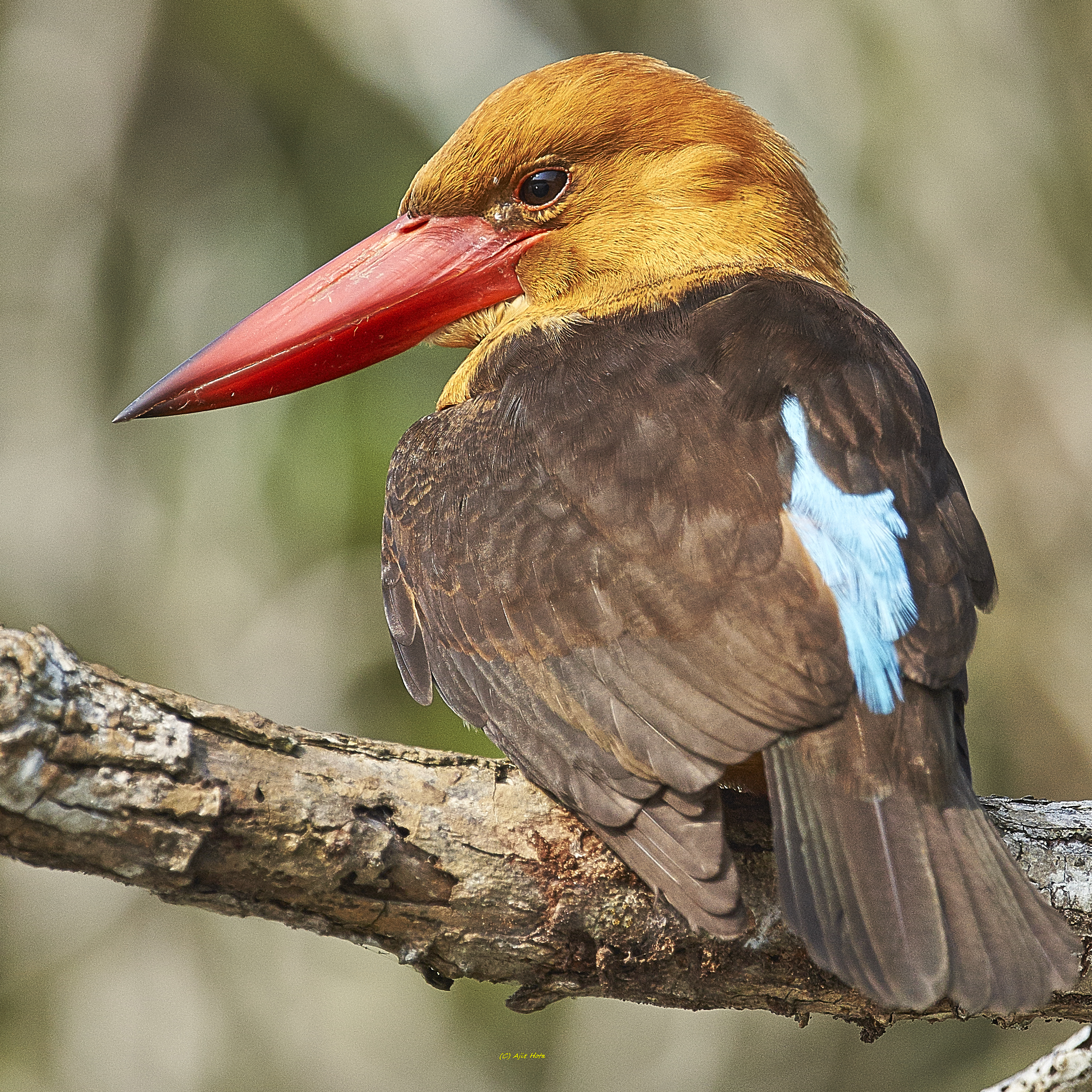
- From Bhitarkanika, Odisha.

Conservation status
- Near Threatened (IUCN 3.1)

Scientific classification
- Kingdom: Animalia
- Phylum: Chordata
- Class: Aves
- Order: Coraciiformes
- Family: Alcedinidae
- Subfamily: Halcyoninae
- Genus: Pelargopsis
- Species: P. amauroptera

Binomial name
- Pelargopsis amauroptera (Pearson, JT, 1841)

Synonyms
- Pelargopsis amauropterus (Pearson, 1841) [orth. error]

= Brown-winged kingfisher =

Species of bird

The brown-winged kingfisher (Pelargopsis amauroptera) is a species of bird in the subfamily Halcyoninae.

It is found along the north and eastern coasts of the Bay of Bengal, occurring in the countries of Bangladesh, India, Malaysia, Myanmar and Thailand. In India, it has been mainly reported from the Sundarbans region but records from further south near Chilka exist.

Its natural habitat is subtropical or tropical mangrove forests.

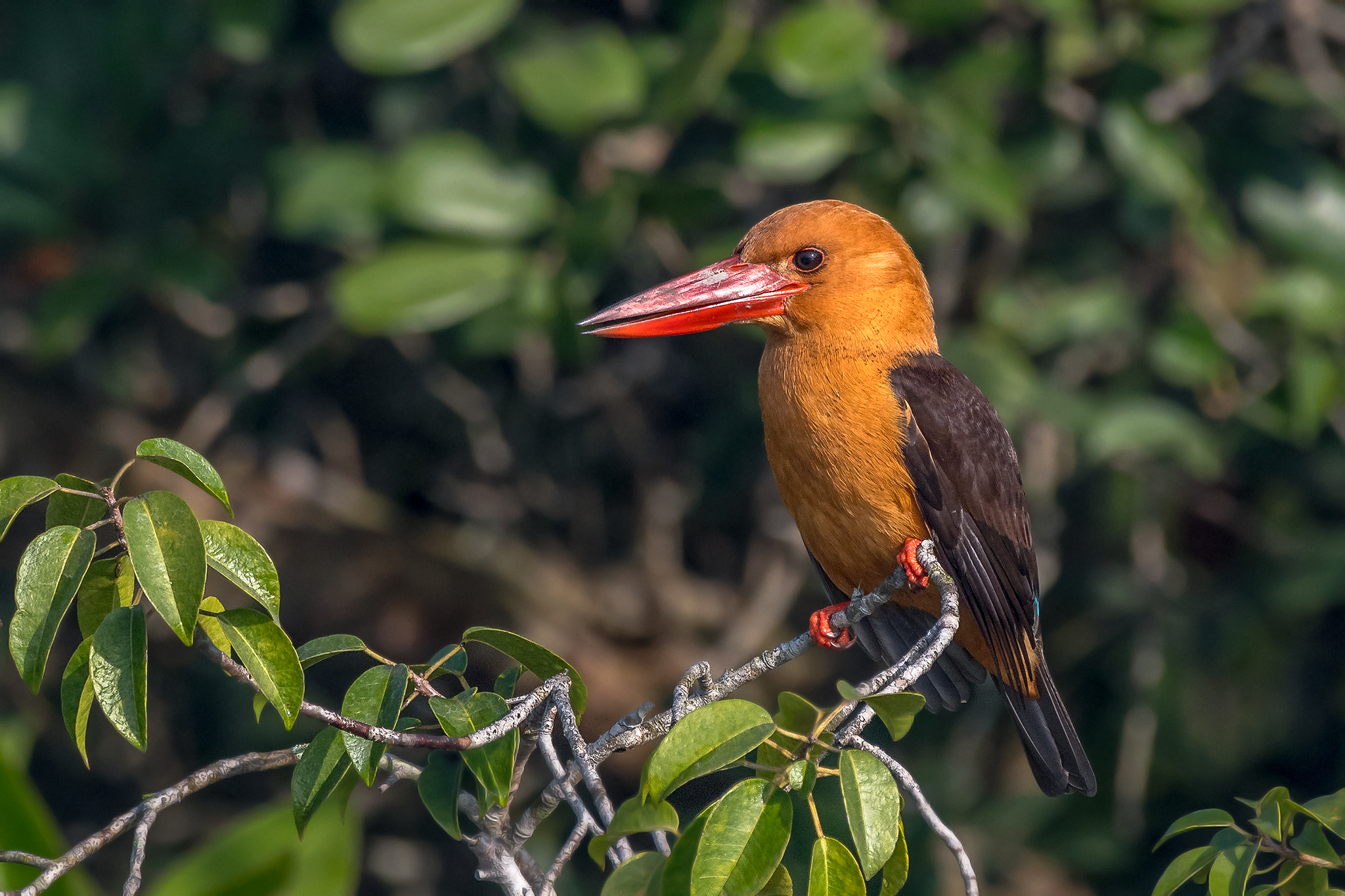
Brown-winged kingfisher, Sundarbans, West Bengal, India
